= Aïn Kermes District =

- District

- Location within Algeria
- Coordinates: 34°55′28.9″N 1°4′48″E
- Country: Algeria
- Province: Tiaret Province
- Time zone: UTC+1 (CET)

Aïn Kermes District is a district of Tiaret Province, Algeria.

The district is further divided into 5 municipalities:

- Aïn Kermes
- Madna
- Medrissa
- Djebilet Rosfa
- Sidi Abderrahmane
