= Ksar Chellala Province =

Ksar Chellala Province ولاية قصر الشلالة ⴰⴳⴻⵣⴷⵓ ⵏ ⵇⵚⴻⵔ ⵛⴻⵍⵍⴰⵍⴰ
- Province
- Map of Ksar Chellala Province
- Coordinates: 35°13′00″N 2°19′00″E
- Country: Algeria
- Created: 2026
- Capital: Ksar Chellala

Area
  - Total: 2,900 km^{2} (1,100 sq mi)

Population (2008)
  - Total: 120,131
  - Density: 41/km^{2} (110/sq mi)
- Time zone: UTC+01 (CET)
- Area code: +213
- ISO 3166 code: DZ-14
- Districts: 2
- Municipalities: 6

Ksar Chellala Province (Arabic: ولاية قصر الشلال) is a province (wilaya) in Algeria, with Ksar Chellala as its provincial capital. It was created in 2026 by separation from Tiaret Province.

The province lies in the transitional zone between the densely populated and fertile north and the sparsely populated south and covers an area of about 2,900 km². Around 120,000 people lived in the province at the 2008 census, giving it a population density of about 41 inhabitants per square kilometre.

== Administrative divisions ==
The wilaya of Ksar Chellala is divided into 6 communes, grouped into 2 districts (daïras).

Daïras	Communes	
Daïras	Name	Pop. 2008
Ksar Chellala	Ksar Chellala	52,753
Ksar Chellala	Zmalet El Emir Abdelkader	18,722
Ksar Chellala	Serghine	5,316
Hamadia	Hamadia	16,463
Hamadia	Rechaiga	19,830
Hamadia	Bougara	7,047
