= Mahdia District =

- District
- Country: Algeria
- Province: Tiaret Province
- Time zone: UTC+1 (CET)

Mahdia District is a district of Tiaret Province, Algeria.

The district is further divided into 4 municipalities:

- Mahdia
- Aïn Zarit
- Nadorah
- Sebaïne
