= Aïn Deheb District =

- District

- Location within Algeria
- Coordinates: 34.8445°N 1.5492°E
- Country: Algeria
- Province: Tiaret Province
- Time zone: UTC+1 (CET)

Aïn Deheb District is a district of Tiaret Province, Algeria.

The district is further divided into 3 municipalities:

- Aïn Deheb
- Naima
- Chehaima
