= Sougueur District =

Sogueur District
- District

- Location within Algeria
- Coordinates: 35.1835°N 1.4959°E
- Country: Algeria
- Province: Tiaret Province
- Time zone: UTC+1 (CET)

Sogueur District is a district of Tiaret Province, Algeria.

The district is further divided into 4 municipalities:

- Sougueur
- Faidja
- Si Abdelghani
- Tousnina
