= Oued Lili District =

- District

- Location within Algeria
- Coordinates: 35.5120°N 1.2713°E
- Country: Algeria
- Province: Tiaret Province
- Time zone: UTC+1 (CET)

Oued Lili District is a district of Tiaret Province, Algeria.

The district is further divided into 3 municipalities:

- Oued Lilli
- Sidi Ali Mellal
- Tidda
