= Medroussa District =

Medroussa District دائرة مدروسة
- District
- Country: Algeria
- Province: Tiaret Province
- Time zone: UTC+1 (CET)

Medroussa District is a district of Tiaret Province, Algeria.

The district is further divided into 3 municipalities:

- Medroussa
- Sidi Bakhti
- Mellakou
