= Frenda District =

- District

- Location within Algeria
- Coordinates: 35°3′42.2″N 1°3′13.9″E
- Country: Algeria
- Province: Tiaret Province
- Time zone: UTC+1 (CET)

Frenda District is a district of Tiaret Province, Algeria.

The district is further divided into 3 municipalities:

- Frenda
- Aïn El Hadid
- Takhemaret
