= Dahmouni District =

- District
- Country: Algeria
- Province: Tiaret Province
- Time zone: UTC+1 (CET)

Dahmouni District is a district of Tiaret Province, Algeria.

The district is further divided into 2 municipalities:

- Dahmouni
- Aïn Bouchekif
