= Mechraâ Sfa District =

- District
- Country: Algeria
- Province: Tiaret Province
- Time zone: UTC+1 (CET)

Mechraâ Sfa District is a district of Tiaret Province, Algeria.

The district is further divided into 3 municipalities:

- Mechraa Safa
- Djillali Ben Omar
- Tagdemt
