= Hamadia District =

- District

- Location within Algeria
- Coordinates: 35°27′39.5″N 1°52′24.3″E
- Country: Algeria
- Province: Ksar Chellala Province
- Time zone: UTC+1 (CET)

Hamadia District is a district of Ksar Chellala Province, Algeria.

The district is further divided into 3 municipalities:

- Hamadia
- Bougara
- Rechaiga
