= Nora Aceval =

Algerian writer (born 1953)

Nora Aceval (born 1953, Tousnina) is a traditional storyteller and writer from Algeria.

== Biography ==
Aceval was born of a French-Algerian father and a Berber mother in Tousnina, on the high plateau of Tiaret Province. Her childhood in Tousnina and Sougueur was permeated with the stories told by the women of the tribe of Ouled Sidi Khaled. She got a degree in nursing and then a master's in modern literature. She collects, retells, translates, writes, and transcribes stories from Algeria, particularly from the region of Djebel Amour and from women of the Maghreb. Her stories appeal to all ages. Children are interested in the tales and characters, while adults are interested in the ideas expressed trying to find a connection between the story and their own lives. She lives in Creil, in France.

== Writing style ==
A large portion of her writing style is attributed to the oral heritage she had inherited from growing up in Algeria. She operates using a literary style known as a naked voice, which is a dialogue that connects different cultures. She likes to focus on women in her stories, and how they are not simply objects. Examples of themes Aceval writes about include inequality of women, sexual triumph and finding identity. Aceval revolves her writing around the theme of love. Her style of writing can be described as smooth and simple.

== Personal life ==
Aceval currently has four children.

== Bibliography ==
- La femme de Djiha, ill. by Sébastien Pignon. Al Manar, 2013.
- La Chamelle, ill. by Sébastien Pignon. Al Manar, 2011.
- La Science des femmes et de l’amour, ill. by Sébastien Pignon. Al Manar, 2009.
- Contes libertin du Maghreb, Introduction by Leïla Sebbar. Ill. by Sébastien Pignon. Al Manar, 2008
- Paroles immigrées en coll. avec Bernard Zimmermann. Préface de Habib Tengour, L’Harmattan, 2008
- Le loup et la colombe, Album, Illustrations Michel Galvin. Seuil Jeunesse, 2008
- L’élève du magicien, Album, Ill. Emre Orhun. Calligraphie : B.Zerouki, Sorbier, 2007
- Le prince tisserand, Album, Ill. Laureen Topalian, Sorbier, 2007 ( Prix Saint Exupéry 2008)
- Hadidouène et l’âne de l’ogresse, Album, Illustrations Merlin. Seuil Jeunesse, 2007
- Les babouches d’Abou Kassem, Album, Illustrations A.Guilloppé. Seuil Jeunesse 2007
- Contes du Djebel Amour.(Recueil) Illustrations Elène Usdin. Seuil, 2006
- Contes et traditions d’Algérie, Flies-France. (Aux origines du monde ), 2005
- L’Algérie des contes et légendes (hauts plateaux de Tiaret) Ed Maisonneuve et Larose, Paris 2003
- Ghazali le bédouin (conte d’Algérie), Essai, Illustrations Boubaker Ayadi. Ed.G&g, 2000
