= Ouled Djerad =

- Commune and town
- Country: Algeria
- Province: Tiaret Province
- Time zone: UTC+1 (CET)

Ouled Djerad is a town and commune in Tiaret Province in north-western Algeria.
