= Sidi Abderrahmane =

Sidi Abderrahmane may refer to:

- Sidi Abderrahmane, Chlef, a town and commune in Algeria
- Sidi Abderrahmane, Tiaret, a town and commune in Algeria
- Sidi Abder Rahman El Thaelebi (1384–1479), Algerian Muslim scholar
