= Aceval =

Aceval may refer to:

- Aceval (surname)
- Benjamín Aceval, Paraguay, a town in Paraguay
- ACEVAL/AIMVAL, joint US Air Force and Navy test program
