= Dhayat Ben Dhahoua District =

Dhayat Ben Dhahoua دائرة ضاية بن ضحوة
- District
- Map of Algeria highlighting Ghardaïa Province
- Coordinates: 32°32′13″N 3°36′20″E
- Country: Algeria
- Province: Ghardaïa Province
- Capital: Dhayet Bendhahoua
- Time zone: UTC+1 (CET)

Dhayat Ben Dhahoua is a district of Ghardaïa Province, Algeria. It is named after its only commune, Dhayet Bendhahoua.

== Municipalities ==
The district has only one municipality:

- Dhayet Bendhahoua
