= Madna (disambiguation) =

Madna is a town and commune in Algeria.

Madna may also refer to:

- Madna, Karnataka, a village in Sedam Taluk, Karnataka, India
- Madna, West Bengal, a census town in West Bengal, India
- Madna Airfield, a World War II airfield in Italy
- Talemzane crater also known as Madna
- Madna (surname)
