= Aceval (surname) =

Aceval is a surname. Notable people with the surname include:

- Danilo Aceval (born 1975), Paraguayan footballer
- Emilio Aceval (1853–1931), Paraguayan president
- Miguel Aceval (born 1983), Chilean footballer
- Nora Aceval (born 1953), Algerian traditional storyteller and writer
