= Bougara, Tiaret =

Coordinates: 35°33′12″N 1°58′02″E

Bougara
- Commune and town
- Interactive map of Bougara
- Country: Algeria
- Province: Tiaret Province
- Time zone: UTC+1 (CET)

Bougara is a town and commune in Tiaret Province in northwestern Algeria.
