= Aghrib =

- Commune and town
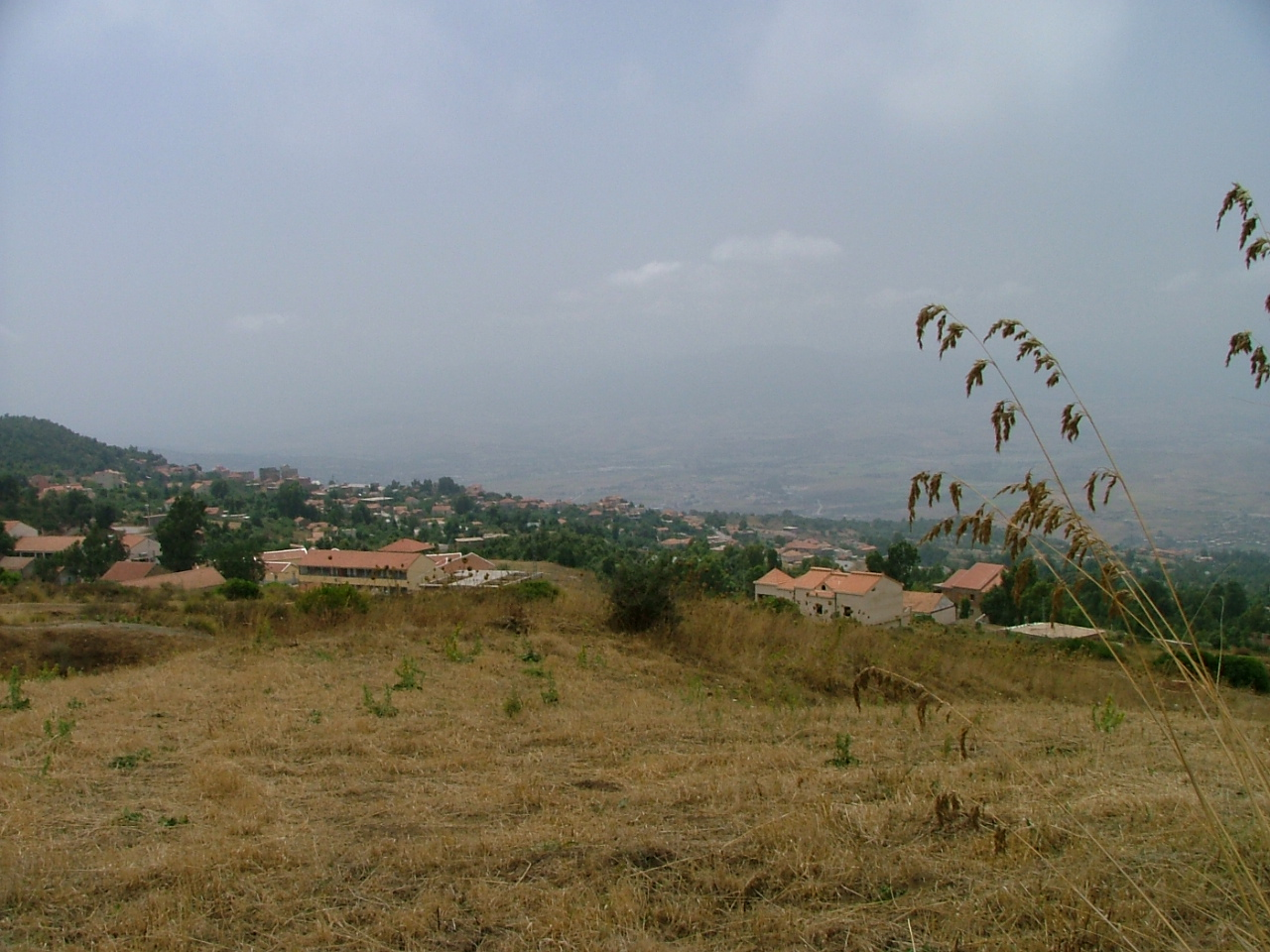
- View of Aghribs

- Location of Aghrib within Azzefoun District

- Location of Aghrib within Algeria
- Coordinates: 36°48′08″N 4°19′22″E
- Country: Algeria
- Province: Tizi Ouzou

Population (2008)
  - Total: 12,474
- Time zone: UTC+1 (CET)

Aghrib or Aghribs (Arabic: أغريب; Berber languages: ⴰⵖⵔⵉⴱ) is a town and commune in the province of Tizi Ouzou in northern Algeria.

== Location ==
Aghribs is a village and commune in the Kabylie region of Algeria. It is located 40 km north east of Tizi Ouzou and approximately 150 km east of Algiers. The village is at an altitude of 800 metres above sea level and at a distance of 10 km from the Mediterranean Sea.

== The People ==
As a village, Aghribs is home to about 2000 people. It is the birthplace of Said Sadi, the co-founder and ex-president of the RCD, the Rassemblement pour la Culture et la Democratie. As of April 2013, the village oldest resident is Mr. Said Ameur, who is 104.

Although archives are inexistent, it is a well established fact that Aghribs was founded by a family or families that left the village of Adrar, a village just a few kilometres away. Today, Aghribs's main families are : Ameur, Ait Lounis, Belkacem, Ait Amara, Ait Yahya, Sadi (or Saadi), Meziani, Laimeche, Tamani, Aider and Ait Aider. In addition to these long established families, many others have joined the village in recent years.

== The School ==
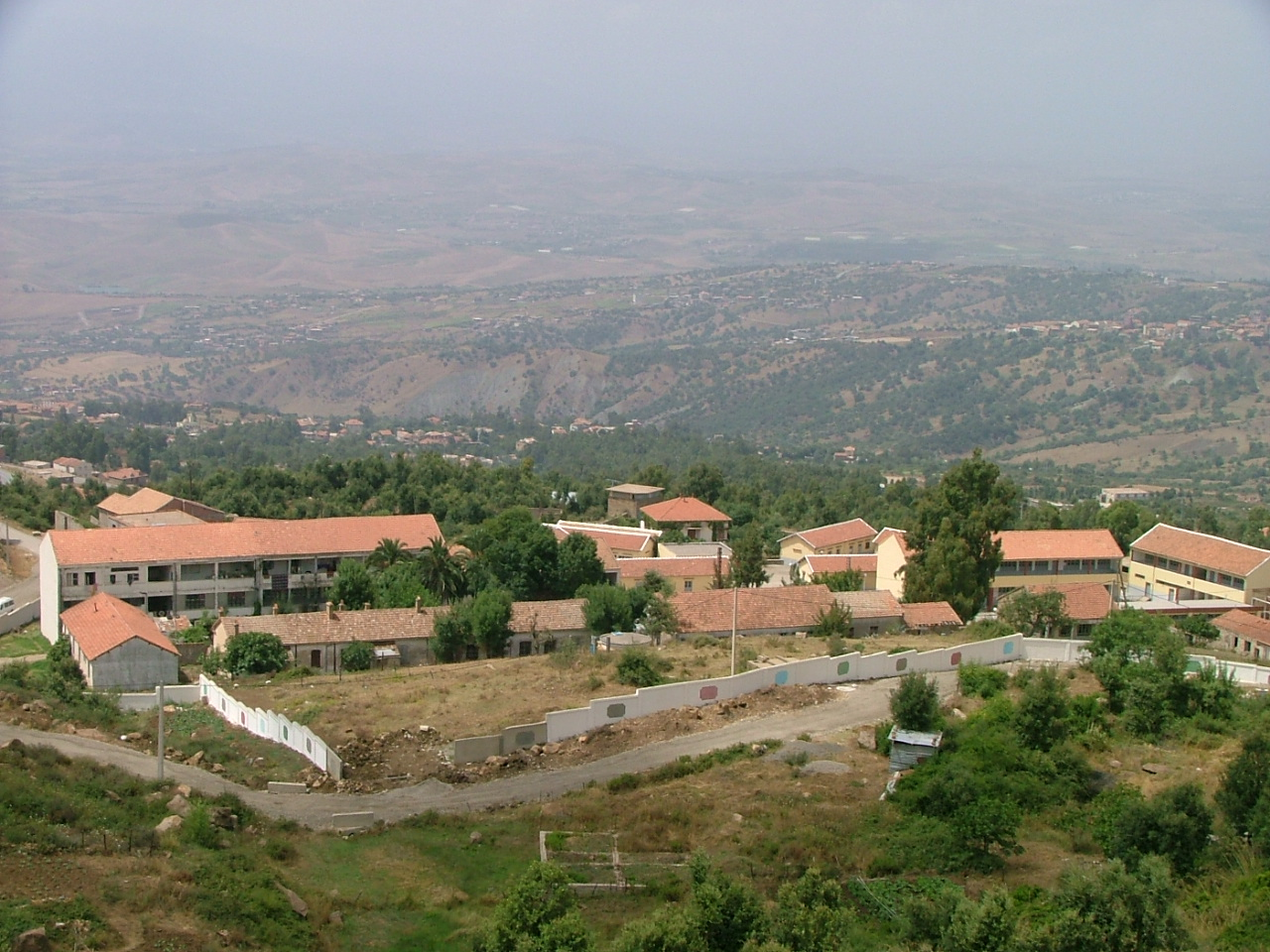
The School with the original building at the forefront

The village school is one of the first schools opened in Kabylie by the old colonial power, France, opening its doors for the first time in 1892. During the war of independence (1954 -1962) Aghribs served as military camp for the French army. Parts of the school were used as a prison and interrogation centre.

After Algeria's independence in 1962, and until 1972, the military barracks were used as an orphanage for hundreds of children, orphaned by the war, who came from all over Kabylie. As a result, thousands of Kabyle children were educated at the village school.

== The Commune ==
Administratively, Aghribs has seen many changes. From a Commune in its own right under the French, it became part of the commune of Freha in 1962. In 1984, following a national electoral boundary reorganisation, the village became a commune. The town hall is now located in the new town of Aguni Cherqi, a couple of kilometres outside the village.

== Economy ==
There are no industries or large scale artisanal activity within the village. Agriculture is practiced on a very small scale and is used mostly to supplement family incomes. The village can still be considered fairly wealthy thanks to remittances from its hundreds of sons and daughters who work elsewhere in the country or overseas.

Historically, Aghribs was well known for its Monday market. For over a hundred years, the market was a place where thousands of economic transactions were carried out every Monday by people who would come from all over Kabylie. The main activities included buying and selling animals (cows, oxen, sheep, donkeys,...), food stuffs (cereals, olive oil, spices, meat,...), agricultural tools, and so forth. However, in recent years, the market has shrunk markedly and is no longer the strong economic driver it once was.

The Tamgout cheese is produced there, and the dairy industry still dominates the local economy.

== The War of Independence ==
During the war of independence (1954 – 1962), like most villages in Kabylie, Aghribs suffered heavy casualties. Twenty four men and a woman, most in their twenties and the youngest only seventeen, lost their lives. Here they are: Aider Amar, Aider Boudjema, Aider Said Ameziane, Ait Aider Amar, Ait Aider Md Arezki, Ait Aider Said Oubelaid, Ait Aider Said (Oumeri, Ait Aider Said Ouramdane, Ait Amara Md (MohandOuh), Ait Lounis Amar, Ait Lounis Ferroudja, Ait Lounis Lounes, Ait Yahia Ali, Ameur Amar, Ameur Ferhat, Belaidi Ramdane, Belkaceme Ahmed, Belkaceme Meziane, Bensaid Rabah, Laimeche Amar, Laimeche Md Amechtouh, Meziani Md, Sadi Abdellah (Amirouche), Sadi Ouidir (Rabah), Sadi Said.
