= Frenda =

- Commune and town
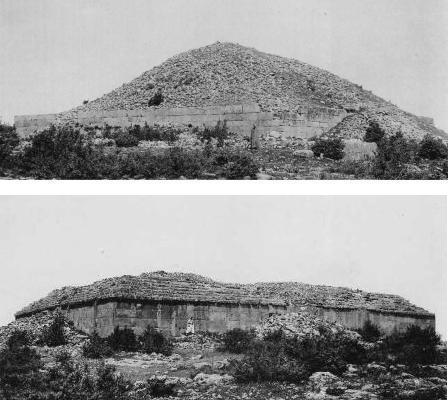

- Location of Frenda within Algeria
- Coordinates: 35°04′N 1°03′E
- Country: Algeria
- Province: Tiaret Province
- District: Frenda District

Population (2008)
  - Total: 54,162
- Time zone: UTC+1 (CET)

Frenda is a town and commune in Tiaret Province in northwestern Algeria. It is best known for ancient Berber monumental tombs known as Jedars.

== Notable people ==
- Larbi Belkheir - Algerian politician
- Abdelkader Benayada - Algerian association football player
- Benhalima Rouane - Algerian association football player
- Edgar Stoëbel - French painter
