= Sidi Naamane =

Coordinates: 36.215056°N 3.123937°E

- Commune and town
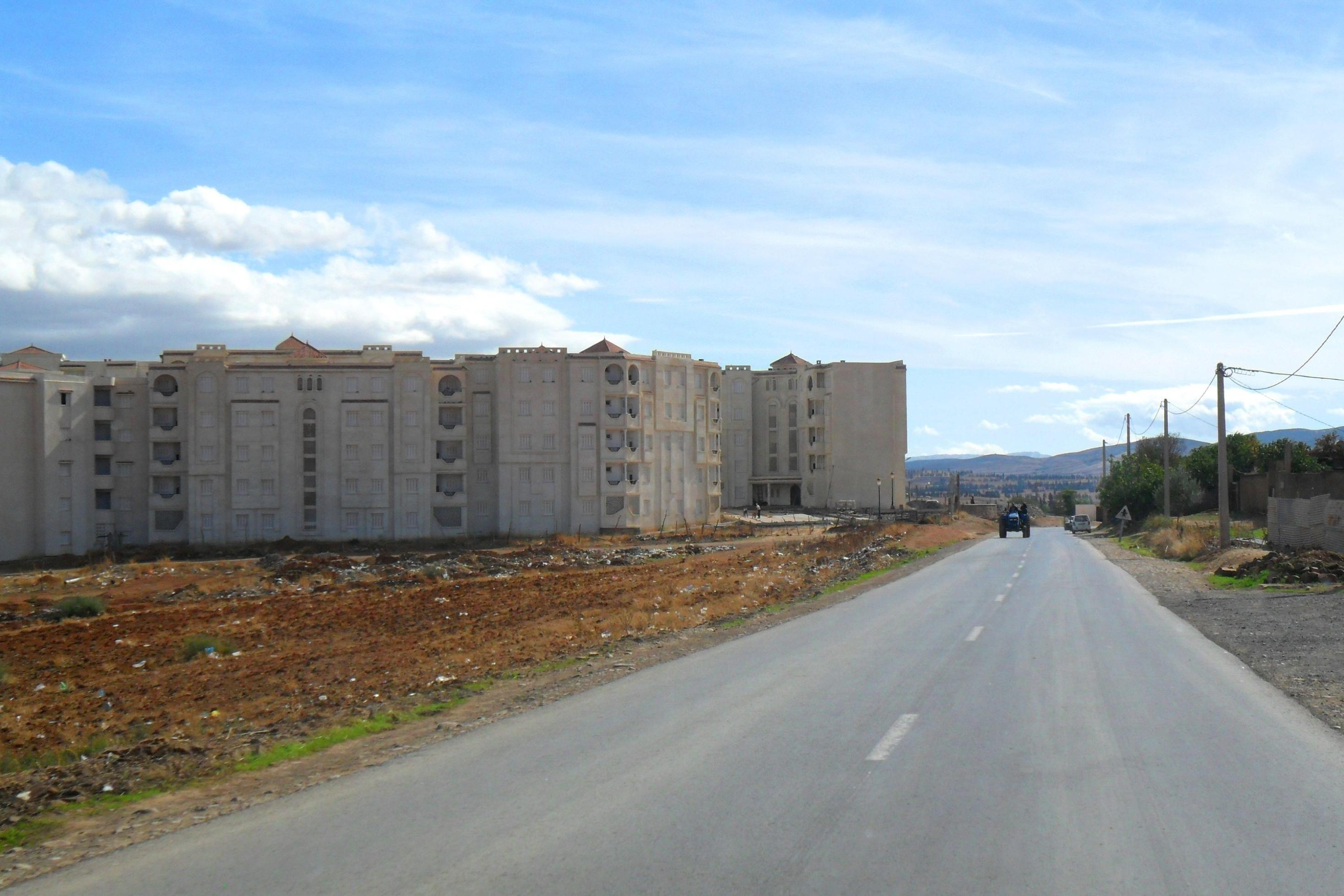
- Interactive map of Sidi Naamane
- Country: Algeria
- Province: Médéa Province

Population (1998)
  - Total: 21,478
- Time zone: UTC+1 (CET)

Sidi Naamane is a town and commune in Médéa Province, Algeria. According to the 1998 census, it has a population of 21,478.
