= Rahouia =

Coordinates: 35°32′N 1°01′E

- Commune and town
- Interactive map of Rahouia
- Country: Algeria
- Province: Tiaret Province
- Time zone: UTC+1 (CET)

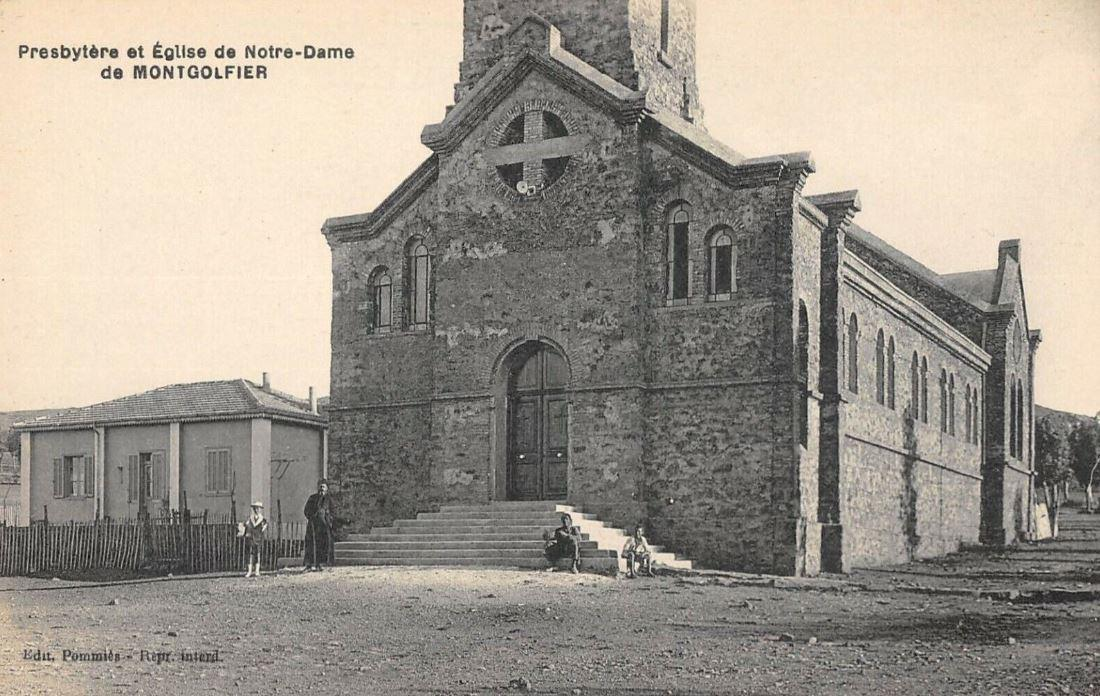
The Notre-Dame church in Rahouia (formerly Montgolfier), Tiaret Province, Algeria

Rahouia is a town and commune in Tiaret Province in north-western Algeria.

== See also ==
- Rahouia District

== Notable people ==
Mazouz El_hocine ((Wali de Batna))
