= Naima, Tiaret =

Coordinates: 35°05′27″N 1°28′39″E

Naima
- Commune and town
- Interactive map of Naima
- Country: Algeria
- Province: Tiaret Province
- Time zone: UTC+1 (CET)

Naima is a town and commune in Tiaret Province in northwestern Algeria.
