= Mechraa Safa =

Mechraa Safa مشرع الصفاء
- Commune and town

- Location within Algeria
- Coordinates: 35°23′2″N 1°3′12″E
- Country: Algeria
- Province: Tiaret Province
- District: Mechraâ Sfa District

Area
  - Total: 116.91 sq mi (302.79 km^{2})

Population (2008)
  - Total: 16,077
- Time zone: UTC+1 (CET)
- CP: 14145

Mechraa Safa is a town and commune in Tiaret Province in northwestern Algeria.
