= Dhayet Bendhahoua =

Dhayet Bendhahoua ضية بن ضحوة
- Commune and town
- Location of Dhayet Bendhahoua commune within Ghardaïa Province

- Location of Dhayet Bendhahoua within Algeria
- Coordinates: 32°32′13″N 3°36′20″E
- Country: Algeria
- Province: Ghardaïa Province
- District: Dhayet Bendhahoua District (coextensive)
- Elevation: 529 m (1,736 ft)

Population (2008)
  - Total: 12,643
- Time zone: UTC+1 (CET)

Dhayet Bendhahoua (Arabic: ضية بن ضحوة) (also written Dayet Ben Dahoua) is a town and commune, coextensive with Dhayet Bendhahoua District, in Ghardaïa Province, Algeria. According to the 2008 census it has a population of 12,643, up from 9,199 in 1998, with an annual growth rate of 3.3%. It lies just 8 kilometres (5.0 mi) northwest of the provincial capital Ghardaïa.

== Geography ==
Dhayet Bendhahoua lies on the banks of the Wadi Mzab, an intermittent river in the M'zab valley, upstream of Ghardaïa. The area has been listed as a UNESCO World Heritage Site.

== Transportation ==
Dhayet Bendhahoua is connected to Ghardaïa by the regional road W147, which loops from Ghardaïa northwest to the town and then back east to the N1 highway. The N1 highway, part of the Trans-Sahara Highway, leads north to Laghouat and south to In Salah.

== Education ==
4.6% of the population has a tertiary education, and another 16.7% has completed secondary education. The overall literacy rate is 80.5%, and is 85.5% among males and 75.2% among females.

== Localities ==
The commune of Dhayet Bendhahoua is composed of one locality:

- Village de Dayet Ben Dahoua et la Palmeraie
