= Bennasser Benchohra =

Coordinates: 33°45′N 3°00′E

Bennasser Benchohra بن ناصر بن شهرة
- Commune and town
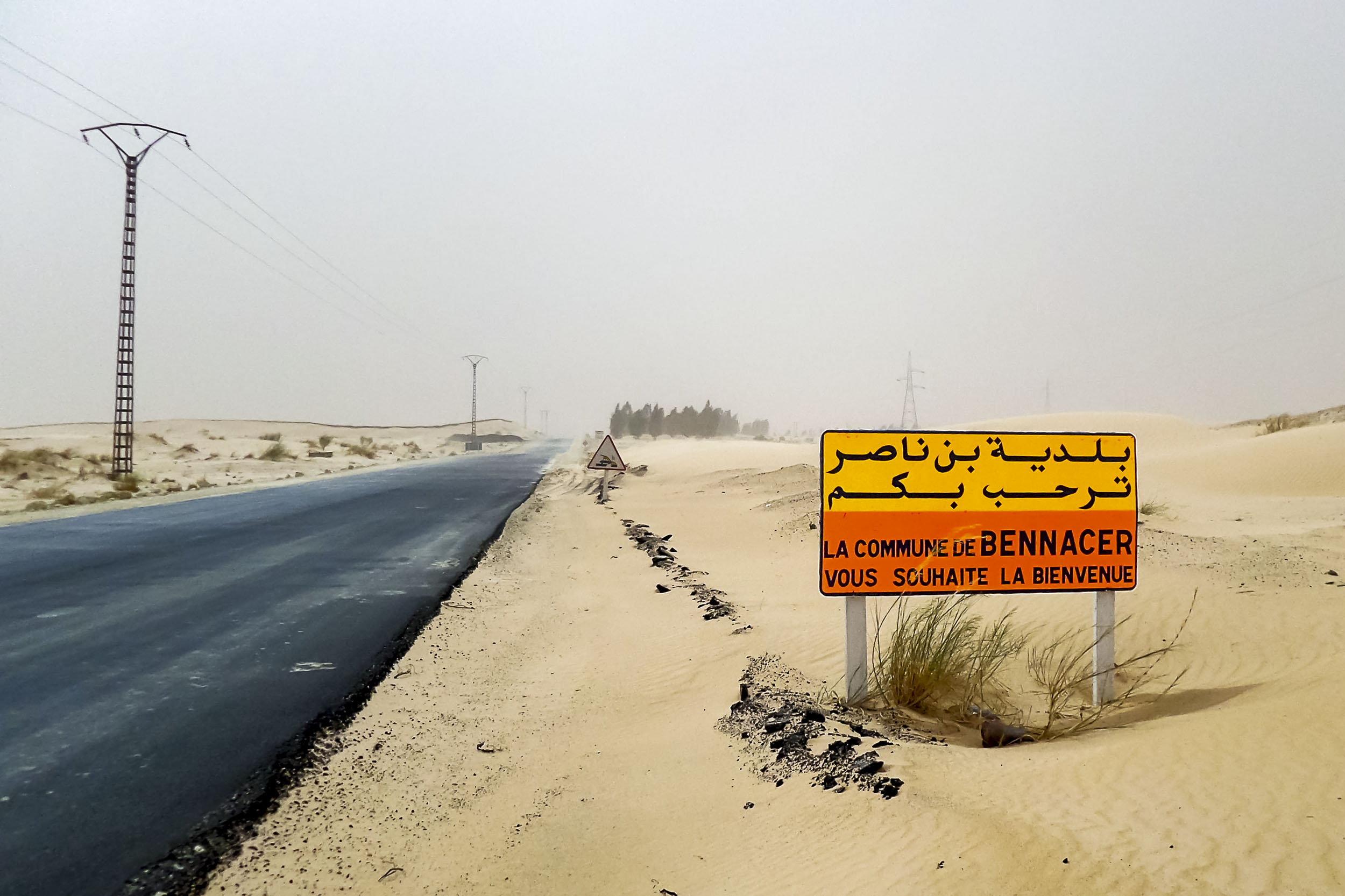

- Country: Algeria
- Province: TOUGGOURT
- District: Taibet

Area
  - Total: 3,880 sq mi (10,050 km^{2})

Population (2008)
  - Total: 9,621
  - Density: 2.479/sq mi (0.9573/km^{2})
- Time zone: UTC+1 (CET)

Bennasser Benchohra is a town and commune in Touggourt Province, Algeria, the town's population is more than 9,621
