= Aït Boumahdi =

Aït-Boumahdi
- Commune and town
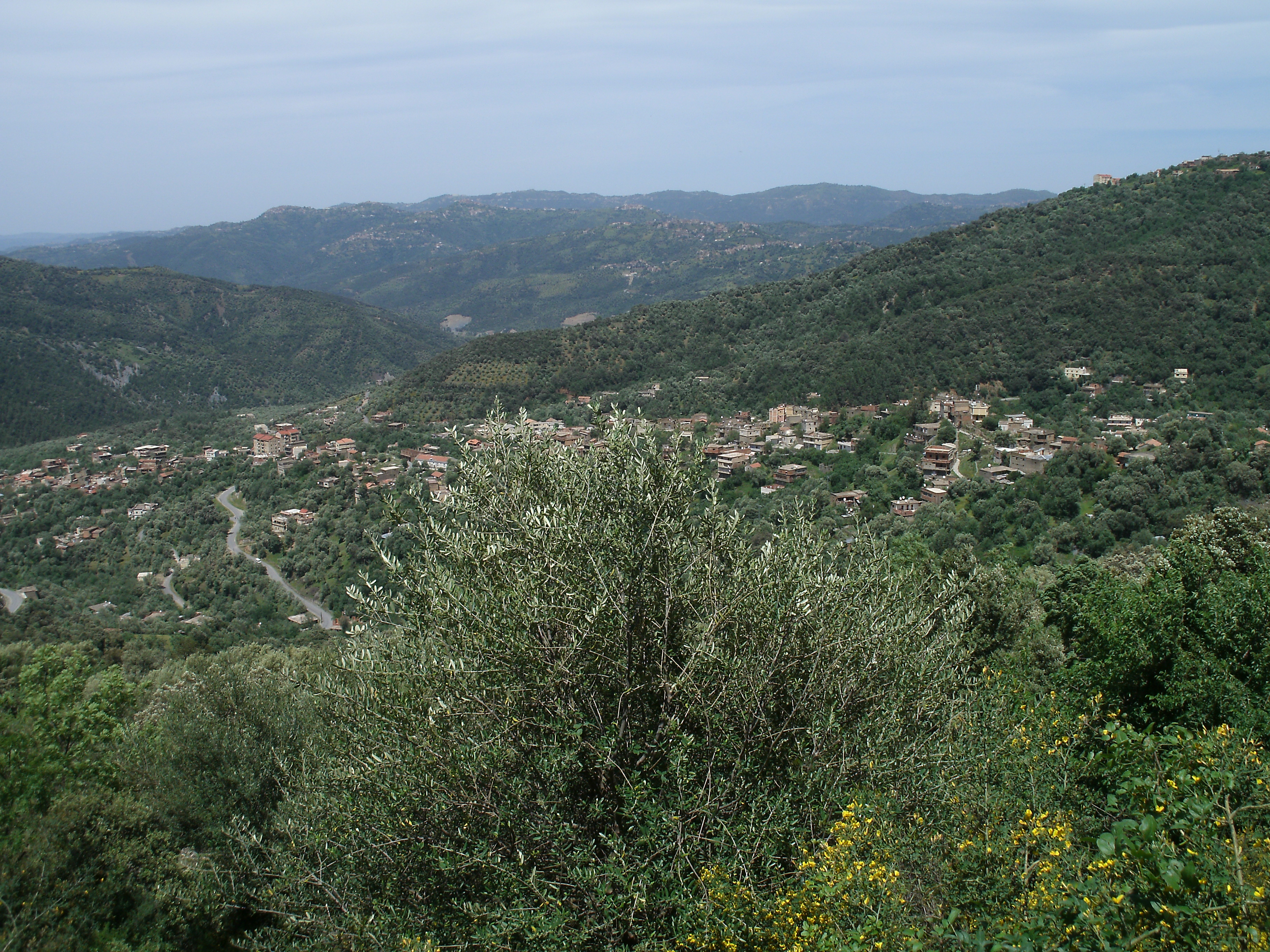

- Location within Algeria
- Country: Algeria
- Province: Tizi Ouzou Province
- District: Ouacif District
- Time zone: UTC+1 (CET)

Aït-Boumahdi is a town and commune in Tizi Ouzou Province in northern Algeria.
