= Sidi Ziane =

Sidi Ziane سيدي زيان
- Commune and town
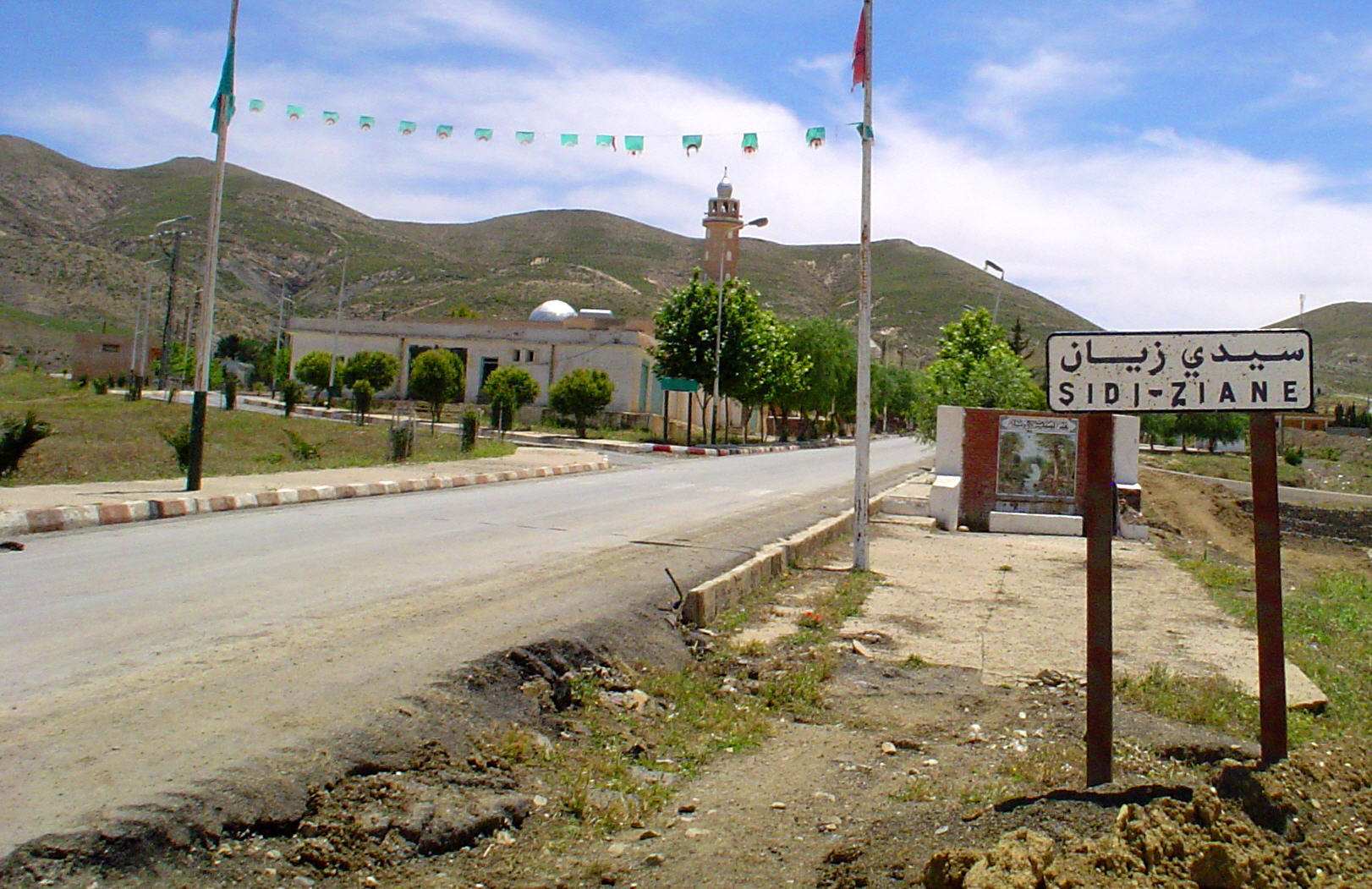

- Location of Sidi Ziane in the Médéa Province

- Location of Sidi Ziane in Algeria
- Coordinates: 35°59′36″N 3°15′20″E
- Country: Algeria
- Province: Médéa
- Daïra: Souaghi

Area
  - Total: 63.77 km^{2} (24.62 sq mi)

Population (2008)
  - Total: 2,671
  - Density: 41.88/km^{2} (108.5/sq mi)
- Time zone: UTC+01:00 (CET)
- Postal code: 26460

Sidi Ziane is a town and commune in Médéa Province, Algeria. According to the 1998 census, it had a population of 3,282.
