= Mahdia, Tiaret =

Mahdia
- Commune and town
- Interactive map of Mahdia
- Coordinates: 35°26′N 1°45′E
- Country: Algeria
- Province: Tiaret Province

Population (2008)
  - Total: 31,396
- Time zone: UTC+1 (CET)

Mahdia is a town and commune in Tiaret Province in northwestern Algeria.

Founded in 1905 by Auguste Burdeau, the town bore the name Burdeau during the French colonial era.
