= Aïn El Hadid =

- Commune and town
- Coordinates: 35°03′29″N 0°53′0″E
- Country: Algeria
- Province: Tiaret Province

Area
  - Total: 170.3 sq mi (441.0 km^{2})

Population (2008)
  - Total: 15,482
  - Density: 90.9/sq mi (35.11/km^{2})
- Time zone: UTC+1 (CET)

Aïn El Hadid is a town and commune in Tiaret Province in northwestern Algeria.

15,482 Population [2008] – Census

441.0 km² Area

35.11/km² Population Density [2008]

1.5% Annual Population Change [1998 → 2008]
