= Zmalet El Emir Abdelkader =

Coordinates: 34°53′36″N 2°18′36″E

- Commune and town
- Country: Algeria
- Province: Tiaret Province
- Time zone: UTC+1 (CET)

Zmalet El Emir Abdelkader is a town and commune in Tiaret Province in north-western Algeria.
