= Guertoufa =

Coordinates: 35°24′N 1°15′E

- Commune and town
- Interactive map of Guertoufa
- Country: Algeria
- Province: Tiaret Province
- Time zone: UTC+1 (CET)

Guertoufa is both a town and a commune located in the Tiaret Province, situated in the northwestern region of Algeria.
