= Chehaima =

Coordinates: 34°53′57″N 1°18′24″E

- Commune and town
- Interactive map of Chehaima
- Country: Algeria
- Province: Tiaret Province
- Time zone: UTC+1 (CET)

Chehaima is a town and commune in Tiaret Province in northwestern Algeria.
