= Djillali Ben Omar =

Coordinates: 35.4445°N 0.8497°E

Djillali Ben Omar جيلالي بن عمار (Arabic) ⵊⵉⵍⴰⵍⵉ ⴱⴻⵏ ⵄⵎⵎⴰⵔ (Berber languages)
- Commune and town
- Interactive map of Djillali Ben Omar
- Country: Algeria
- Province: Tiaret Province
- Time zone: UTC+1 (CET)

Djillali Ben Omar is a town and commune in Tiaret Province in northwestern Algeria.
