= Sebaïne =

Sebaïne سبعين
- Commune and town

- Location within Algeria
- Coordinates: 35°27′22″N 1°36′13″E
- Country: Algeria
- Province: Tiaret Province

Population (2008)
  - Total: 10,763
- Time zone: UTC+1 (CET)

Sebaïne is a town and commune in Tiaret Province in north-western Algeria.
