= Si Abdelghani =

Coordinates: 35°13′55″N 01°38′5″E

- Commune and town
- Interactive map of Si Abdelghani
- Country: Algeria
- Province: Tiaret Province
- Time zone: UTC+1 (CET)

Si Abdelghani is a town and commune in Tiaret Province in north-western Algeria.
