= Serghine =

- Commune and town
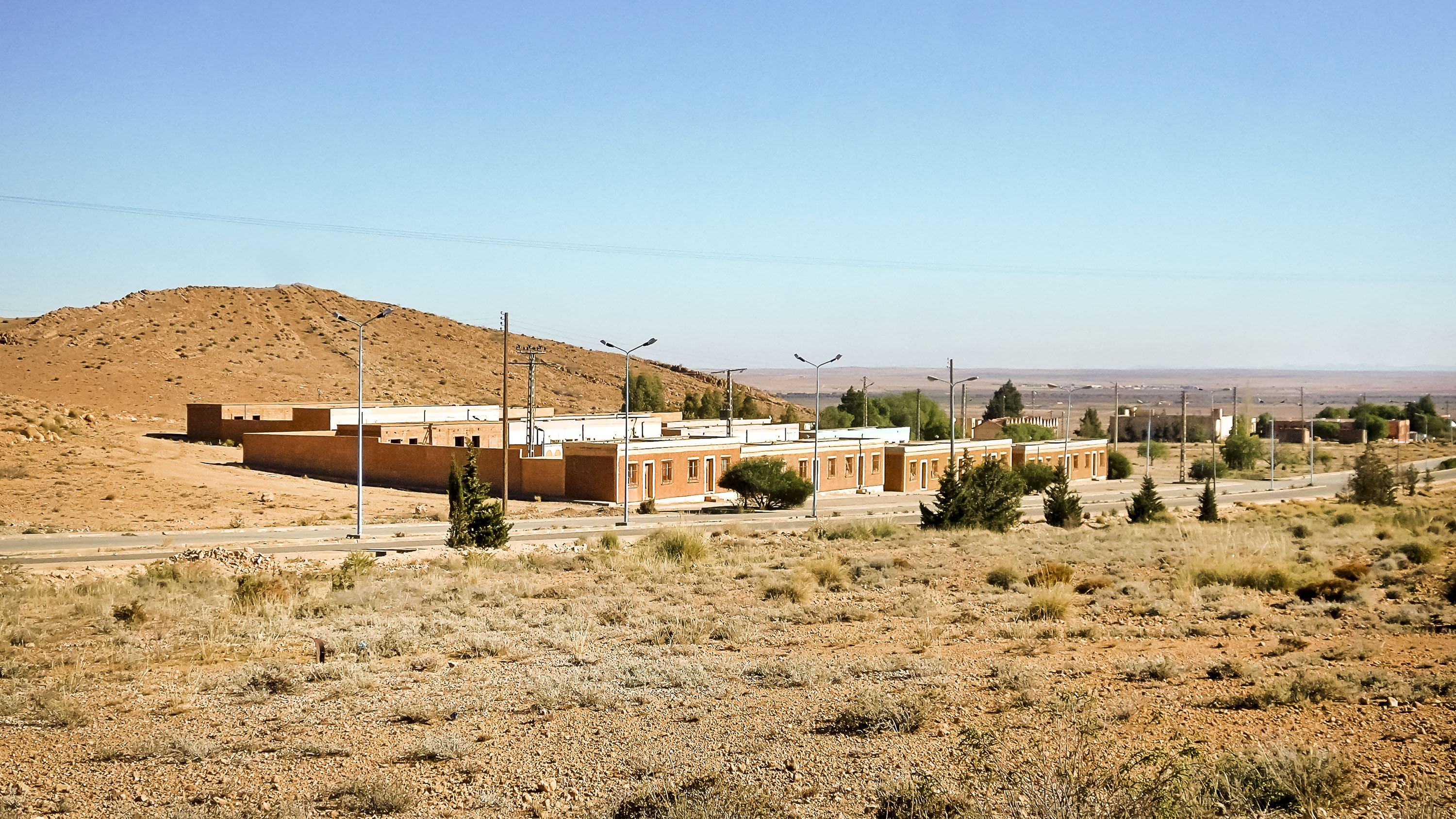

- Location within Algeria
- Country: Algeria
- Province: Tiaret Province
- Time zone: UTC+1 (CET)

Serghine is a town and commune in Tiaret Province in north-western Algeria.
