= Oued Lilli =

Coordinates: 35°30′43″N 1°16′17″E

- Commune and town
- Interactive map of Oued Lilli
- Country: Algeria
- Province: Tiaret Province
- Time zone: UTC+1 (CET)

Oued Lilli is a town and commune in Tiaret Province in northwestern Algeria.
