= Faidja =

Coordinates: 35°11′33″N 1°34′52″E

- Commune and town
- Interactive map of Faidja
- Country: Algeria
- Province: Tiaret Province
- Time zone: UTC+1 (CET)

Faidja is a town and commune in Tiaret Province in northwestern Algeria.
