= Sidi Ali Mellal =

- Commune and town

- Location within Algeria
- Coordinates: 35°33′48″N 1°13′32″E
- Country: Algeria
- Province: Tiaret Province

Population (2008)
  - Total: 7,193
- Time zone: UTC+1 (CET)

Sidi Ali Mellal is a town and commune in Tiaret Province in north-western Algeria.
