= Tiaret Province =

Province of Algeria

Tiaret Province ولاية تيارت
- Province
- Flag

- Map of Algeria highlighting Tiaret
- Coordinates: 35°23′N 01°20′E
- Country: Algeria
- Capital: Tiaret

Government
  - Wāli: Abdelouahab Bertima

Area
  - Total: 20,673 km^{2} (7,982 sq mi)

Population (2008)
  - Total: 842,063
  - Density: 40.733/km^{2} (105.50/sq mi)
- Time zone: UTC+01 (CET)
- Area Code: +213 (0) 46
- ISO 3166 code: DZ-14
- Districts: 14
- Municipalities: 42

Tiaret (Arabic: ولاية تيارت) is a province (wilaya) of Algeria and its capital is Tiaret.

The National Stud Farm of Chaouchaoua is located in the province of Tiaret.

== History ==
The province was created from El Asnam department and Tiaret department in 1974. In 1984, Tissemsilt Province was carved out of its territory.

== Administrative division ==
The province is divided into 14 districts (daïras), which are further divided into 42 communes or municipalities.

=== Districts ===
1. Aïn Deheb
2. Aïn Kermes
3. Dahmouni
4. Frenda
5. Hamadia
6. Ksar Chellala
7. Mahdia
8. Mechraâ Sfa
9. Medroussa
10. Meghila
11. Oued Lili
12. Rahouia
13. Sogueur
14. Tiaret

=== Communes ===
1. Aïn Bouchekif
2. Aïn Deheb
3. Aïn El Hadid
4. Aïn Kermes
5. Aïn Zarit
6. Bougara
7. Chehaima
8. Dahmouni
9. Djebilet Rosfa
10. Djillali Ben Omar
11. Faidja
12. Frenda
13. Guertoufa
14. Hamadia
15. Ksar Chellala
16. Madna
17. Mahdia
18. Mechraa Safa
19. Medrissa
20. Medroussa
21. Meghila
22. Mellakou
23. Nadorah
24. Naima
25. Oued Lilli
26. Rahouia
27. Rechaiga
28. Sebaine
29. Sebt
30. Serghine
31. Si Abdelghani
32. Sidi Abderrahmane
33. Sidi Ali Mellal
34. Sidi Bakhti
35. Sidi Hosni
36. Sougueur
37. Tagdemt
38. Takhemaret
39. Tiaret
40. Tidda
41. Tousnina
42. Zmalet El Emir Abdelkader
