= Nadorah =

Coordinates: 35°17′18″N 1°53′26″E

- Commune and town
- Interactive map of Nadorah
- Country: Algeria
- Province: Tiaret Province

Population (1998)
  - Total: 7,030
- Time zone: UTC+1 (CET)

Nadorah is a town and commune in Tiaret Province, Algeria. According to the 1998 census it has a population of 7,030.
