= Tidda =

Tidda تيدة
- Commune and town

- Location within Algeria
- Coordinates: 35°34′57″N 1°15′58″E
- Country: Algeria
- Province: Tiaret Province

Area
  - Total: 8,748 sq mi (22,656 km^{2})

Population (2008)
  - Total: 3,669
- Time zone: UTC+1 (CET)
- Postal code: 14155

Tidda is a town and commune in Tiaret Province in north-western Algeria.
