= Sidi Hosni =

Coordinates: 35°28′N 1°31′E

- Commune and town
- Interactive map of Sidi Hosni
- Country: Algeria
- Province: Tiaret Province
- Time zone: UTC+1 (CET)

Sidi Hosni is a town and commune in Tiaret Province in north-western Algeria.
