= Sebt =

Coordinates: 35°37′10″N 1°21′05″E

- Commune and town
- Interactive map of Sebt
- Country: Algeria
- Province: Tiaret Province
- Time zone: UTC+1 (CET)

Sebt is a town and commune in Tiaret Province in north-western Algeria.
