= Hamadia, Tiaret =

Coordinates: 35°27′34″N 1°52′29″E

Hamadia
- Commune and town
- Interactive map of Hamadia
- Country: Algeria
- Province: Tiaret Province
- Time zone: UTC+1 (CET)

Hamadia is a town and commune in Tiaret Province in northwestern Algeria.
