= Aïn Deheb =

Coordinates: 34°50′40″N 1°32′57″E

- Commune and Town
- Interactive map of Aïn Deheb
- Country: Algeria
- Province: Tiaret Province
- Time zone: UTC+1 (CET)

Aïn Deheb is a town and commune in Tiaret Province in northwestern Algeria. The town had 24340 inhabitants as of 2008.
