= Djebilet Rosfa =

- Commune and town

- Location within Algeria
- Coordinates: 34°51′51″N 0°50′6″E
- Country: Algeria
- Province: Tiaret Province

Area
  - Total: 18,190 sq mi (47,113 km^{2})

Population (2008)
  - Total: 4,930
- Time zone: UTC+1 (CET)

Djebilet Rosfa is a town and commune in Tiaret Province in northwestern Algeria.
