= Merad =

Merad is a surname. Notable people with the surname include:

- Brahim Merad (born 1953), Algerian politician
- Kad Merad (born 1964), French-Algerian filmmaker and actor
- Miriam Merad (born 1969), French-Algerian immunologist

== See also ==
- Beni Merad, or Béni Mered, Algerian town
