= Aïn Bouchekif =

- Commune and town

- Aïn Bouchekif within Algeria
- Coordinates: 35°21′21″N 1°30′38″E
- Country: Algeria
- Province: Tiaret Province
- Time zone: UTC+1 (CET)

Aïn Bouchekif is a town and commune in Tiaret Province in northwestern Algeria.
