= Takhemaret =

- Commune and town

- Location within Algeria
- Coordinates: 35°6′26″N 0°41′0″E
- Country: Algeria
- Province: Tiaret Province

Population (2008)
  - Total: 34,124
- Time zone: UTC+1 (CET)

Takhemaret is a town and commune in Tiaret Province in north-western Algeria, about 65 km. southwest of the city of Tiaret. The 2008 census population was 34,124 in the commune, with 20,827 in the city.

During the Roman Empire it was named Cohors Breucorum, a "castrum" (fort) near the Roman limes in Mauretania Caesariensis.

== See also ==
- Cohors Breucorum
