= Medrissa =

- Commune and town

- Location within Algeria
- Coordinates: 34°53′33″N 1°14′37″E
- Country: Algeria
- Province: Tiaret Province

Area
  - Total: 102 sq mi (265 km^{2})

Population (2008)
  - Total: 15,293
- Time zone: UTC+1 (CET)
- Postal code: 14250

Medrissa is a town and commune in Tiaret Province in northwestern Algeria.
