= Medroussa =

Coordinates: 35°10′N 1°12′E

- Commune and town
- Interactive map of Medroussa
- Country: Algeria
- Province: Tiaret Province

Population (1998)
  - Total: 11,428
- Time zone: UTC+1 (CET)

Medroussa is a town and commune in Tiaret Province in northwestern Algeria.
