= Tagdemt =

Coordinates: 35°20′08″N 1°13′38″E

- Commune and town
- Country: Algeria
- Province: Tiaret Province
- Time zone: UTC+1 (CET)

Tagdemt (also spelt Taqidemt) is a town and commune in Tiaret Province in north-western Algeria.
