= Sidi Bakhti =

Coordinates: 35°14′28″N 0°58′42″E

- Country: Algeria
- Province: Tiaret Province

Population (2008)
  - Total: 7,247
- Time zone: UTC+1 (CET)

Sidi Bakhti is a town and commune in Tiaret Province in north-western Algeria.
