= Meghila =

Coordinates: 35°37′11″N 1°21′04″E

- Commune and town
- Interactive map of Meghila
- Country: Algeria
- Province: Tiaret Province
- Time zone: UTC+1 (CET)

Meghila is a town and commune in Tiaret Province in northwestern Algeria.
