= Dahmouni =

Coordinates: 35°25′N 1°29′E

- Commune and town
- Interactive map of Dahmouni
- Country: Algeria
- Province: Tiaret Province
- Time zone: UTC+1 (CET)

Dahmouni is a town and commune in Tiaret Province in northwestern Algeria.
