= Mellakou =

Mellakou ملاكو
- Commune and town

- Location within Algeria
- Coordinates: 35°15′11″N 1°14′4″E
- Country: Algeria
- Province: Tiaret Province
- Time zone: UTC+1 (CET)

Mellakou is a town and commune in Tiaret Province in northwestern Algeria.
