= Aïn Kermes =

Coordinates: 34.908176°N 1.108074°E

- Commune and town
- Interactive map of Aïn Kermes
- Country: Algeria
- Province: Tiaret Province
- Time zone: UTC+1 (CET)

Aïn Kermes is a town and commune in Tiaret Province in northwestern Algeria.
