= Aïn Zarit =

Aïn Zarit عين زاريت
- Commune and town
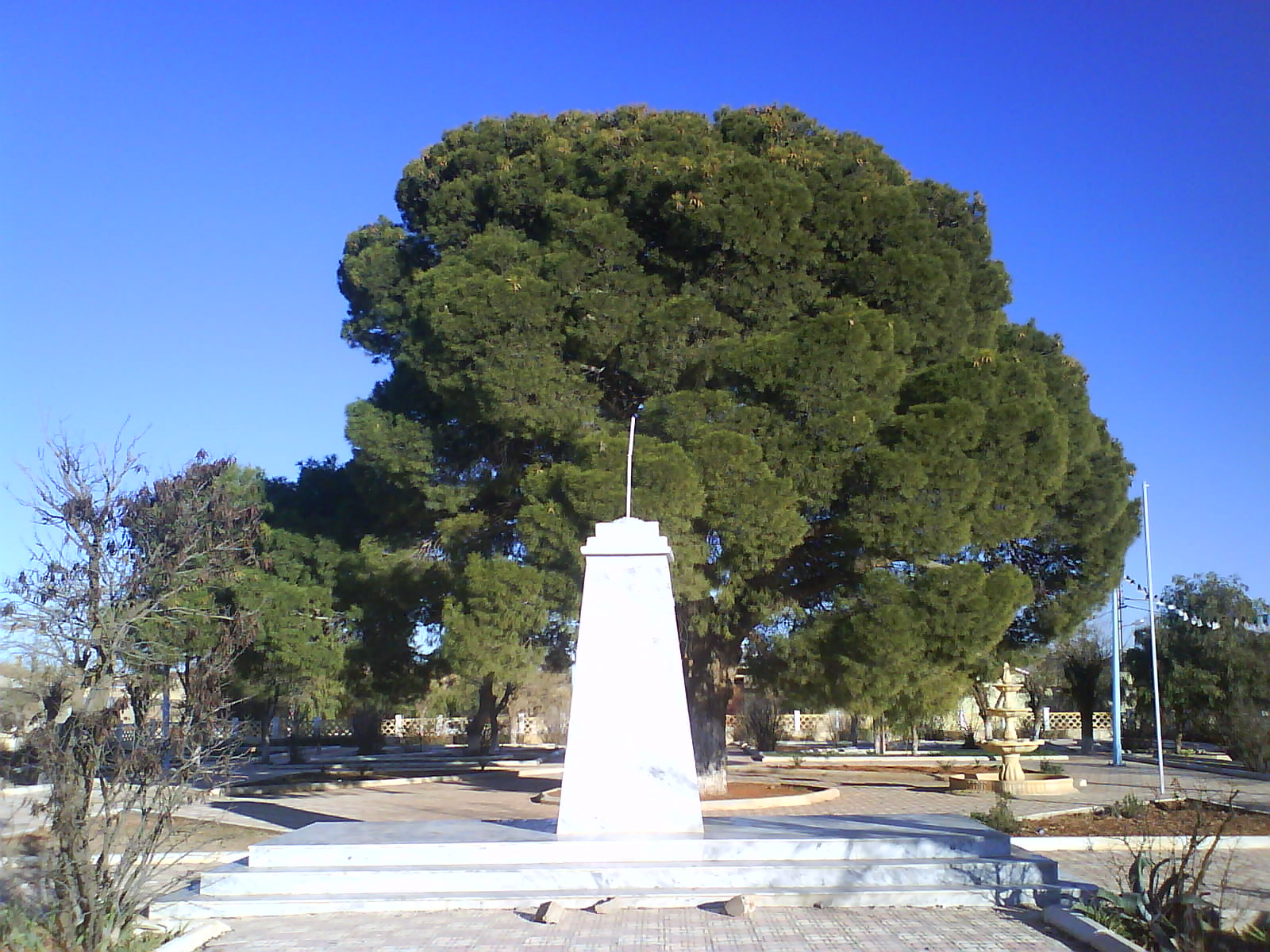

- Location within Algeria
- Coordinates: 35°21′10″N 01°40′08″E
- Country: Algeria
- Province: Tiaret Province
- District: Mehdia

Population (2008)
  - Total: 8,139
- Time zone: UTC+1 (CET)
- Area code: 1405 (ONS)

Aïn Zarit (Arabic: عين زاريت) is a town and commune in Tiaret Province in northwestern Algeria. According to the 2008 census it has a population of 8139.
