= Tousnina =

Coordinates: 35°06′40″N 1°16′35″E

- Commune and town
- Interactive map of Tousnina
- Country: Algeria
- Province: Tiaret Province
- Time zone: UTC+1 (CET)

Tousnina is a town and commune in Tiaret Province in north-western Algeria.
