= Rechaiga =

Rechaiga الرشايقة
- Commune and town

- Location within Algeria
- Coordinates: 35°24′29″N 1°58′24″E
- Country: Algeria
- Province: Tiaret Province

Population (2008)
  - Total: 19,830
- Time zone: UTC+1 (CET)
- CP: 14300

Rechaiga is a town and commune in Tiaret Province in north-western Algeria.
