= Sougueur =

Coordinates: 35°11′N 1°30′E

Sougueur السوقر
- City (Common and Daira)
- Location of Sougueur in the Tiaret Province
- Country: Algeria
- Province: Tiaret Province
- District: Sougueur District
- APC: 2012-2017

Government
  - Type: Municipality

Area
  - Total: 99.54 sq mi (257.82 km^{2})

Population (2008)
  - Total: 78,956
- Time zone: UTC+1 (CET)
- Postal code: 14003
- ISO 3166 code: CP

Sougueur is a town and commune in Tiaret Province in north-western Algeria.
