= Madna =

Coordinates: 34°45′11″N 0°58′58″E

Madna مادنة
- Commune and town
- Interactive map of Madna
- Country: Algeria
- Province: Tiaret Province
- Time zone: UTC+1 (CET)

Madna is a town and commune in Tiaret Province in northwestern Algeria.
