= Sidi Abderrahmane, Tiaret =

Sidi Abderrahmane
- Commune and town

- Location within Algeria
- Coordinates: 34°47′55″N 1°07′49″E
- Country: Algeria
- Province: Tiaret Province

Population (2008)
  - Total: 7,082
- Time zone: UTC+1 (CET)

Sidi Abderrahmane is a town and commune in Tiaret Province in north-western Algeria.
