= Communes of Algeria =

The communes of Algeria (Arabic: بلدية (singular)), also known as municipalities, form the third level of administrative subdivisions of Algeria. As of 2002, there were 1,541 municipalities in the country. The municipalities are also known as communes (baladiyahs).

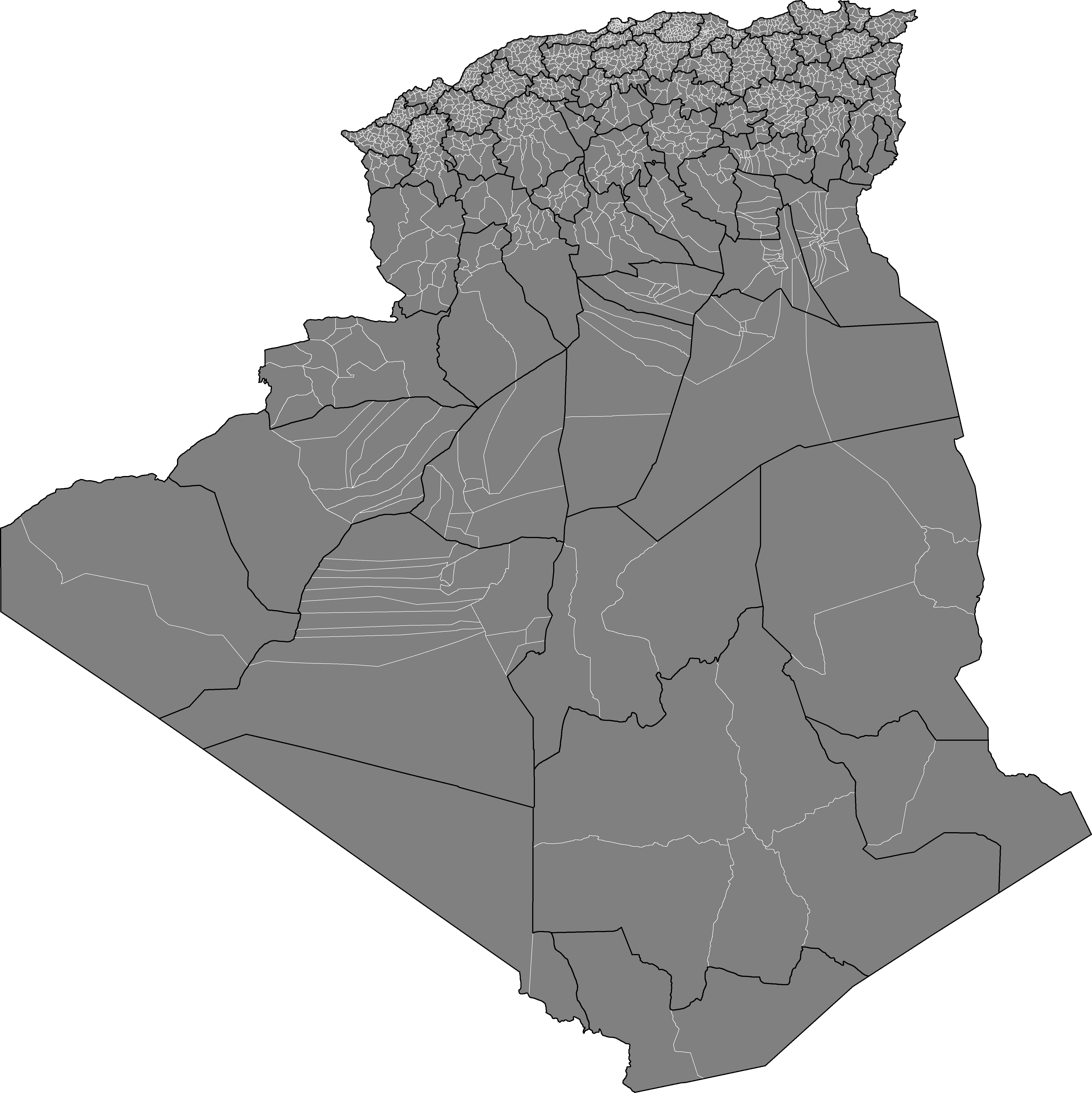
Map of Algeria's communes by province (2026)

== List ==
This list is a copy from the Statoids page named Municipalities of Algeria. The population data is from June 25, 1998.

Commune	HASC	Population
Abadla	DZ.BC.AB	10,845
Abalissa	DZ.TM.AB	6,484
Abdelkader Azil	DZ.BT.AA	12,133
Abi Youcef	DZ.TO.AU	7,743
Abou El Hassen	DZ.CH.AH	20,164
Achaacha	DZ.MG.AC	31,367
Adekar	DZ.BJ.AD	13,544
Adrar	DZ.AR.AD	43,903
Aafir	DZ.BM.AF	12,613
Aflou	DZ.LG.AF	53,260
Aghbal	DZ.TP.AG	6,606
Aghbalou	DZ.BU.AG	19,530
Aghlal	DZ.AT.AG	6,841
Agouni Gueghrane	DZ.TO.AG	10,833
Aghrib	DZ.TO.AR	13,408
Ahl El Ksar	DZ.BU.AK	12,315
Ahmed Rachedi	DZ.ML.AR	14,489
Ahmar El Ain	DZ.TP.AA	25,633
Ahnif	DZ.BU.AF	10,268
Aïn Abessa	DZ.SF.AB	15,058
Aïn Abid	DZ.CO.AA	25,958
Aïn Adden	DZ.SB.AA	2,319
Aïn Arnat	DZ.SF.AA	30,129
Aïn Azel	DZ.SF.AZ	41,073
Aïn Babouche	DZ.OB.AC	14,597
Aïn Beida	DZ.OB.AB	92,197
Aïn Beida	DZ.OG.AB	14,500
Aïn Beida Harriche	DZ.ML.AB	18,513
Aïn Ben Beida	DZ.GL.AB	8,269
Ain Benian	DZ.AD.AN	4,677
Ain Benian	DZ.AL.AB	52,343
Aïn Ben Khelil	DZ.NA.AB	30,776
Aïn Bessem	DZ.BU.AB	36,830
Aïn Bouchekif	DZ.TR.AB	12,386
Aïn Boucif	DZ.MD.AB	24,434
Aïn Boudinar	DZ.MG.AB	5,241
Aïn Bouihi	DZ.AD.AB	13,920
Aïn Bouziane	DZ.SK.AB	8,381
Aïn Bya	DZ.OR.AB	26,253
Aïn Charchar	DZ.SK.AC	13,717
Aïn Chouhada	DZ.DJ.AC	8,337
Aïn Defla	DZ.AD.AD	52,276
Aïn Deheb	DZ.TR.AD	25,366
Aïn Djasser	DZ.BT.AD	13,232
Aïn El Arbaa	DZ.AT.AA	12,443
Aïn El Assel	DZ.ET.AA	12,482
Aïn El Berd	DZ.SB.AB	13,779
Aïn El Berda	DZ.AN.AB	17,446
Aïn El Diss	DZ.OB.AD	2,741
Aïn El Fakroun	DZ.OB.AF	47,237
Aïn El Hadid	DZ.TR.AH	13,358
Aïn El Hadjar	DZ.BU.AH	7,988
Aïn El Hadjar	DZ.SD.AH	21,493
Aïn El Hadjel	DZ.MS.AH	27,661
Aïn El Hammam	DZ.TO.AE	20,118
Aïn El Ibel	DZ.DJ.AI	20,436
Aïn El Kebira	DZ.SF.AK	32,113
Aïn El Kercha	DZ.OB.AK	27,255
Aïn El Melh	DZ.MS.AM	23,272
Aïn El Orak	DZ.EB.AO	1,990
Aïn Errich	DZ.MS.AR	10,548
Ain Fares	DZ.MC.AF	12,454
Ain Fares	DZ.MS.AF	3,563
Aïn Fekan	DZ.MC.AK	10,573
Aïn Fekka	DZ.DJ.AF	16,842
Aïn Ferah	DZ.MC.AR	5,394
Aïn Fettah	DZ.TL.AH	7,005
Aïn Fezza	DZ.TL.AF	9,598
Aïn Frass	DZ.MC.AS	1,628
Aïn Ghoraba	DZ.TL.AG	4,842
Aïn Hassainia	DZ.GL.AH	6,371
Aïn Kada	DZ.SB.AK	1,852
Aïn Kebira	DZ.TL.AK	3,512
Aïn Kechra	DZ.SK.AK	21,968
Aïn Kerma	DZ.ET.AK	12,182
Aïn Kerma	DZ.OR.AK	6,980
Aïn Kermes	DZ.TR.AK	13,768
Aïn Khadra	DZ.MS.AK	19,412
Aïn Kihel	DZ.AT.AK	8,192
Aïn Lahdjar	DZ.SF.AJ	29,871
Aïn Laloui	DZ.BU.AL	5,893
Aïn Larbi	DZ.GL.AL	7,756
Aïn Lechiakh	DZ.AD.AL	12,119
Aïn Legraj	DZ.SF.AL	17,100
Aïn Maabed	DZ.DJ.AM	13,183
Aïn Madhi	DZ.LG.AM	6,263
Aïn Makhlouf	DZ.GL.AM	11,018
Aïn Mellouk	DZ.ML.AM	12,716
Aïn Merane	DZ.CH.AM	37,142
Aïn M'lila	DZ.OB.AM	69,798
Aïn Naga	DZ.BS.AN	10,054
Aïn Nehala	DZ.TL.AN	6,432
Aïn Nouïssy	DZ.MG.AN	11,389
Aïn Ou Ksir	DZ.MD.AO	5,366
Aïn Oulmene	DZ.SF.AO	59,855
Aïn Oussera	DZ.DJ.AO	82,597
Aïn Rahma	DZ.RE.AR	11,035
Aïn Reggada	DZ.GL.AR	7,289
Aïn Romana	DZ.BL.AR	9,667
Aïn Roua	DZ.SF.AR	11,454
Aïn Sandel	DZ.GL.AS	5,083
Aïn Sebt	DZ.SF.AS	14,290
Aïn Séfra	DZ.NA.AS	34,962
Aïn Sekhouna	DZ.SD.AK	5,725
Aïn Sidi Ali	DZ.LG.AS	4,220
Aïn Sidi Chérif	DZ.MG.AS	7,819
Aïn Smara	DZ.CO.AS	24,426
Aïn Soltane	DZ.AD.AS	18,541
Aïn Soltane	DZ.SA.AS	3,266
Aïn Soltane	DZ.SD.AS	6,068
Aïn Taghrout	DZ.BB.AG	11,103
Aïn Tagourait	DZ.TP.AT	9,075
Aïn Tallout	DZ.TL.AT	9,106
Aïn Tarik	DZ.RE.AT	12,287
Aïn Taya	DZ.AL.AT	29,515
Aïn Tedles	DZ.MG.AT	31,685
Aïn Témouchent	DZ.AT.AT	57,673
Aïn Tesra	DZ.BB.AT	9,358
Aïn Thrid	DZ.SB.AH	1,969
Aïn Tindamine	DZ.SB.AN	2,383
Aïn Tine	DZ.ML.AT	6,653
Aïn Tolba	DZ.AT.AB	11,188
Aïn Torki	DZ.AD.AT	8,280
Aïn Touila	DZ.KH.AT	14,769
Aïn Touta	DZ.BT.AT	52,143
Aïn TurK	DZ.BU.AT	6,841
Aïn Turk	DZ.OR.AT	26,251
Aïn Yagout	DZ.BT.AY	8,988
Aïn Youcef	DZ.TL.AY	11,865
Aïn Zaatout	DZ.BS.AZ	4,000
Ain Zana	DZ.SA.AZ	7,512
Aïn Zaouia	DZ.TO.AN	16,764
Aïn Zarit	DZ.TR.AZ	7,673
Aïn Zerga	DZ.TB.AZ	18,998
Aïn Zitoun	DZ.OB.AZ	5,993
Aïn Zouit	DZ.SK.AZ	2,230
Aissaouia	DZ.MD.AS	6,507
Aït Aggouacha	DZ.TO.AA	3,986
Aït Bouaddou	DZ.TO.AD	13,834
Aït Boumahdi	DZ.TO.AB	6,721
Aït Chafâa	DZ.TO.AC	3,865
Aït Khelili	DZ.TO.AI	12,630
Aït Laziz	DZ.BU.AZ	14,056
Aït Mahmoud	DZ.TO.AM	9,369
Aït Naoual Mezada	DZ.SF.AN	6,562
Aït Oumalou	DZ.TO.AO	9,233
Aït R'zine	DZ.BJ.AR	14,619
Aït Smaïl	DZ.BJ.AS	10,690
Aït Tizi	DZ.SF.AT	7,859
Aït Toudert	DZ.TO.AT	9,723
Aït Yahia	DZ.TO.AH	16,485
Aït Yahia Moussa	DZ.TO.AY	19,904
Akabli	DZ.AR.AK	7,513
Akbil	DZ.TO.AL	9,751
Akbou	DZ.BJ.AB	44,854
Akerrou	DZ.TO.AK	5,070
Akfadou	DZ.BJ.AF	7,502
Alaimia	DZ.MC.AL	6,750
Alger Centre	DZ.AL.AC	96,329
Amalou	DZ.BJ.AL	9,116
Amarnas	DZ.SB.AM	6,212
Amieur	DZ.TL.AM	11,725
Amira Arras	DZ.ML.AA	18,722
Amizour	DZ.BJ.AZ	34,217
Ammal	DZ.BM.AM	8,567
Ammari	DZ.TS.AM	7,360
Ammi Moussa	DZ.RE.AM	26,886
Amoucha	DZ.SF.AM	19,714
Amourah	DZ.DJ.AR	5,879
Annaba	DZ.AN.AN	247,701
Aokas	DZ.BJ.AO	14,494
Aomar	DZ.BU.AO	20,464
Aoubellil	DZ.AT.AO	4,339
Aouf	DZ.MC.AO	7,326
Aougrout	DZ.AR.AG	9,878
Aoulef	DZ.AR.AL	15,229
Arbaouet	DZ.EB.AR	3,252
Arib	DZ.AD.AR	20,782
Arris	DZ.BT.AR	24,607
Arzew	DZ.OR.AR	66,720
Asfour	DZ.ET.AS	10,632
Assela	DZ.NA.AL	4,784
Assi Youcef	DZ.TO.AS	14,411
Ath Mansour Taourirt	DZ.BU.AM	9,283
Azails	DZ.TL.AZ	6,728
Azazga	DZ.TO.AZ	30,911
Azzaba	DZ.SK.AA	48,992
Azeffoun	DZ.TO.AF	16,096
Aziz	DZ.MD.AZ	10,697
Azizia	DZ.MD.AI	7,905
Baata	DZ.MD.BA	3,192
Baba Hassen	DZ.AL.BH	13,827
Babar	DZ.KH.BB	28,182
Bab El Assa	DZ.TL.BA	8,989
Bab El Oued	DZ.AL.BO	87,557
Bab Ezzouar	DZ.AL.BE	92,157
Babor	DZ.SF.BR	18,445
Bachedjerah	DZ.AL.BJ	90,073
Badredine El Mokrani	DZ.SB.BM	5,966
Baghai	DZ.KH.BG	6,414
Baghlia	DZ.BM.BG	15,854
Balidat Ameur	DZ.OG.BA	12,135
Baraki	DZ.AL.BR	95,247
Barbouche	DZ.AD.BB	4,686
Barika	DZ.BT.BR	85,670
Bathia	DZ.AD.BT	5,919
Batna	DZ.BT.BT	247,520
Bayadha	DZ.EO.BA	26,535
Bazer Sakhra	DZ.SF.BS	25,586
Béchar	DZ.BC.BE	134,954
Bechloul	DZ.BU.BE	10,403
Bedjene	DZ.TB.BJ	3,685
Beidha	DZ.LG.EB	7,381
Beidha Bordj	DZ.SF.BB	31,250
Béjaïa	DZ.BJ.BJ	150,195
Bekkaria	DZ.TB.BK	7,551
Bekkouche Lakhdar	DZ.SK.BL	14,092
Belaas	DZ.AD.BL	5,303
Belassel Bouzegza	DZ.RE.BB	10,933
Belaiba	DZ.MS.BB	20,839
Belala	DZ.OB.BL	2,566
Belarbi	DZ.SB.BL	7,415
Belimour	DZ.BB.BE	10,301
Belkheir	DZ.GL.BE	14,979
Belaa	DZ.SF.BE	14,593
Benabdelmalek Ramdane	DZ.MG.BR	12,577
Benaceur	DZ.OG.BE	7,808
Benachiba Chelia	DZ.SB.BC	5,086
Benairia	DZ.CH.BN	13,509
Ben Aknoun	DZ.AL.BA	19,404
Ben Allal	DZ.AD.BA	7,979
Ben Azzouz	DZ.SK.BA	24,969
Ben Badis (El Horia)	DZ.CO.BB	13,869
Ben Badis	DZ.SB.BB	17,617
Benchicao	DZ.MD.BC	8,946
Ben Choud	DZ.BM.BC	8,853
Ben Daoud	DZ.BB.BD	13,472
Bendaoud	DZ.RE.BE	14,560
Ben Djerrah	DZ.GL.BD	4,202
Ben Freha	DZ.OR.BF	14,565
Ben Guecha	DZ.EO.BG	1,036
Benhar	DZ.DJ.BH	10,380
Beni Abbes	DZ.BC.BA	8,850
Beni Aissi	DZ.TO.BA	7,914
Beni Amrane	DZ.BM.BA	21,452
Beniane	DZ.MC.BE	4,530
Beni Aziz	DZ.SF.BZ	17,913
Beni Bahdel	DZ.TL.BD	2,660
Beni Bechir	DZ.SK.BB	8,450
Beni Bouattab	DZ.CH.BB	2,551
Beni Boussaid	DZ.TL.BB	11,894
Beni Chaib	DZ.TS.BC	3,266
Beni Chebana	DZ.SF.BC	15,534
Beni Dejllil	DZ.BJ.BD	8,983
Beni Dergoun	DZ.RE.BD	10,540
Beni Douala	DZ.TO.BD	21,891
Beni Fouda	DZ.SF.BF	16,876
Beni Foudala El Hakania	DZ.BT.BF	1,142
Beni Hamidane	DZ.CO.BH	8,197
Beni Haoua	DZ.CH.BH	17,602
Beni Ikhlef	DZ.BC.BI	2,280
Beni Ilmane	DZ.MS.BI	7,478
Beni K'Sila	DZ.BJ.BK	4,586
Beni Lahcene	DZ.TS.BL	4,572
Benimaouche	DZ.BJ.BE	15,157
Beni-Mellikeche	DZ.BJ.BM	9,643
Beni Merad	DZ.BL.BM	21,457
Béni Messous	DZ.AL.BS	17,490
Beni Mester	DZ.TL.BM	15,671
Beni Mezline	DZ.GL.BZ	4,491
Beni Mileuk	DZ.TP.BM	6,890
Beni Mouhli	DZ.SF.BM	8,678
Beni Ouarsous	DZ.TL.BO	11,018
Beni Ourtilane	DZ.SF.BO	11,969
Beni Oulbane	DZ.SK.BO	20,977
Beni Ounif	DZ.BC.BO	8,199
Beni Oussine	DZ.SF.BN	10,210
Beni Rached	DZ.CH.BR	21,069
Beni Rached	DZ.TL.BR	6,518
Beni Saf	DZ.AT.BS	39,668
Beni Slimane	DZ.MD.BS	31,588
Beni Smiel	DZ.TL.BL	4,048
Beni Snous	DZ.TL.BS	10,888
Beni-Tamou	DZ.BL.BT	22,797
Beni Yenni	DZ.TO.BY	6,813
Beni Zentis	DZ.RE.BZ	10,655
Beni Zid	DZ.SK.BZ	17,379
Beni-Zekki	DZ.TO.BK	3,943
Beni Zmenzer	DZ.TO.BZ	12,117
Benkhelil	DZ.BL.BE	22,361
Ben M'Hidi	DZ.ET.BM	28,399
Bennasser Benchohra	DZ.LG.BB	7,948
Bensekrane	DZ.TL.BE	13,288
Ben Srour	DZ.MS.BS	18,893
Benyacoub	DZ.DJ.BY	6,456
Benyahia Abderrahmane	DZ.ML.BA	10,222
Benzouh	DZ.MS.BZ	4,197
Berbacha	DZ.BJ.BB	18,391
Berhoum	DZ.MS.BM	17,838
Berrahal	DZ.AN.BE	18,681
Berriane	DZ.GR.BE	24,802
Berriche	DZ.OB.BR	16,274
Berrihane	DZ.ET.BR	8,326
Berrouaghia	DZ.MD.BE	58,780
Besbes (Ouled Harkat)	DZ.BS.BE	6,481
Besbes	DZ.ET.BS	43,007
Bethioua	DZ.OR.BE	14,738
Behir Chergui	DZ.OB.BH	1,870
Bin El Ouiden	DZ.SK.BE	17,587
Bir Ben Laabed	DZ.MD.BB	10,543
Bir Bouhouche	DZ.SA.BB	5,552
Bir Chouhada	DZ.OB.BC	8,356
Bir Dheb	DZ.TB.BD	7,023
Bir El Arch	DZ.SF.BA	21,004
Bir-El-Ater	DZ.TB.BA	59,264
Bir El Djir	DZ.OR.BD	73,029
Bir El Hammam	DZ.SB.BH	2,169
Bir Foda	DZ.MS.BF	4,463
Bir Ghbalou	DZ.BU.BG	9,141
Bir Haddada	DZ.SF.BH	18,233
Birine	DZ.DJ.BI	26,617
Bir Kasdali	DZ.BB.BK	12,622
Birkhadem	DZ.AL.BD	55,084
Bir El Mokadem	DZ.TB.BM	12,479
Bir Mourad Raïs	DZ.AL.BM	43,254
Bir Ould Khelifa	DZ.AD.BO	10,568
Birtouta	DZ.AL.BT	21,808
Biskra	DZ.BS.BI	178,064
Bitam	DZ.BT.BI	9,270
Blida	DZ.BL.BL	144,225
Boghni	DZ.TO.BG	31,983
Bologhine Ibnou Ziri	DZ.AL.BI	43,283
Bordj Badji Mokhtar	DZ.AR.BB	9,323
Bordj Ben Azzouz	DZ.BS.BB	11,043
Bordj Bou Arréridj	DZ.BB.BB	134,666
Bordj Bounaama	DZ.TS.BB	18,394
Bordj El Bahri	DZ.AL.BB	27,905
Bordj El Emir Abdelkader	DZ.TS.BE	8,953
Bordj El Haouasse	DZ.IL.BH	2,185
Bordj El Kiffan	DZ.AL.BK	103,690
Bordj Emir Khaled	DZ.AD.BE	7,201
Bordj Ghdir	DZ.BB.BG	23,289
Bordj Menaiel	DZ.BM.BM	53,782
Bordj Okhriss	DZ.BU.BO	8,937
Bordj Omar Driss	DZ.IL.BO	3,547
Bordj Sabat	DZ.GL.BS	10,079
Bordj T'har	DZ.JJ.BT	4,893
Bordj Zemoura	DZ.BB.BZ	11,726
Bouaarfa	DZ.BL.BA	30,258
Bou Aiche	DZ.MD.BU	8,635
Bouaichoune	DZ.MD.BO	4,036
Boualem	DZ.EB.BL	5,386
Bouandas	DZ.SF.BD	15,556
Bouati Mahmoud	DZ.GL.BM	8,823
Boucaid	DZ.TS.BD	8,910
Bouchakroune	DZ.BS.BO	10,800
Bouchegouf	DZ.GL.BO	20,921
Bouchrahil	DZ.MD.BH	18,308
Bouchtata	DZ.SK.BC	9,126
Bouda	DZ.AR.BO	8,668
Bouderbala	DZ.BU.BB	16,697
Boudjebaa El Bordj	DZ.SB.BE	3,169
Boudjellil	DZ.BJ.BL	12,430
Boudjeriou Messaoud	DZ.CO.BM	7,975
Boudjima	DZ.TO.BJ	15,771
Boudouaou	DZ.BM.BD	54,401
Boudouaou El Bahri	DZ.BM.BB	10,512
Boudriaa Ben Yadjis	DZ.JJ.BY	10,352
Boufarik	DZ.BL.BF	60,190
Boufatis	DZ.OR.BO	9,906
Bougaa	DZ.SF.BG	28,431
Bougara	DZ.TR.BO	6,637
Boghar	DZ.MD.BG	5,880
Boughezoul	DZ.MD.BZ	14,094
Bougous	DZ.ET.BG	10,576
Bougtoub	DZ.EB.BG	13,605
Bouguerra	DZ.BL.BG	42,746
Bouguirat	DZ.MG.BO	26,954
Bou Hachana	DZ.GL.BC	5,575
Bouhadjar	DZ.ET.BH	16,385
Bou Hamdane	DZ.GL.BH	4,517
Bouhamza	DZ.BJ.BH	10,846
Bou Hanifia	DZ.MC.BO	16,953
Bouharoun	DZ.TP.BH	8,613
Bouhatem	DZ.ML.BO	19,193
Bou Henni	DZ.MC.BH	10,240
Bouhlou	DZ.TL.BH	5,675
Bouhmama	DZ.KH.BO	9,669
Bouihi	DZ.TL.BI	7,618
Bouinan	DZ.BL.BO	24,871
Bouïra	DZ.BU.BR	75,086
Bouira Lahdab	DZ.DJ.BL	8,897
Bou Ismail	DZ.TP.BI	38,445
Boukadir	DZ.CH.BK	41,655
Boukais	DZ.BC.BK	890
Boukhadra	DZ.TB.BO	9,963
Boukhanafis	DZ.SB.BO	9,385
Boukhlifa	DZ.BJ.BO	9,518
Boukram	DZ.BU.BK	6,275
Boulhaf Dir	DZ.TB.BL	4,200
Boulhilat	DZ.BT.BL	6,593
Boumagueur	DZ.BT.BG	8,482
Boumahra Ahmed	DZ.GL.BA	15,273
Boumedfaâ	DZ.AD.BF	17,898
Boumerdès	DZ.BM.BO	33,646
Boumia	DZ.BT.BM	747
Bounouh	DZ.TO.BN	10,077
Bounoura	DZ.GR.BO	27,775
Bouchared	DZ.AD.BR	25,844
Bouraoui Belhadef	DZ.JJ.BF	10,965
Bourkika	DZ.TP.BO	18,810
Bourouba	DZ.AL.BU	77,498
Bou Saâda	DZ.MS.BD	104,336
Bousfer	DZ.OR.BS	11,136
Bouskene	DZ.MD.BK	13,302
Bousselam	DZ.SF.BL	16,302
Boussemghoun	DZ.EB.BS	2,480
Boucif Ouled Askeur	DZ.JJ.BO	12,780
Boutaleb	DZ.SF.BT	8,328
Bouteldja	DZ.ET.BT	15,275
Bouti Sayeh	DZ.MS.BT	7,806
Boutlélis	DZ.OR.BL	17,599
Bouzaréah	DZ.AL.BZ	69,153
Bou Zedjar	DZ.AT.BZ	4,251
Bouzeghaia	DZ.CH.BZ	20,268
Bouzeguene	DZ.TO.BO	26,168
Bouzegza Keddara	DZ.BM.BK	8,484
Bouzina	DZ.BT.BZ	13,888
Branis	DZ.BS.BR	4,976
Breira	DZ.CH.BA	11,808
Brezina	DZ.EB.BR	8,536
Brida	DZ.LG.BR	5,742
Casbah	DZ.AL.CA	50,453
Chaabet El Ham	DZ.AT.CH	13,438
Chabet El Ameur	DZ.BM.CA	30,223
Challalat El Adhaoura	DZ.MD.CL	57,214
Chahbounia	DZ.MD.CB	13,405
Chahna	DZ.JJ.CN	9,453
Chaiba	DZ.TP.CB	16,376
Charef	DZ.DJ.CH	19,373
Charouine	DZ.AR.CH	8,678
Chebaita Mokhtar	DZ.ET.CM	20,913
Chebli	DZ.BL.CB	21,506
Chechar	DZ.KH.CC	21,468
Cheffia	DZ.ET.CF	7,450
Cheguig	DZ.EB.CG	1,693
Chehaima	DZ.TR.CH	10,099
Chekfa	DZ.JJ.CK	25,187
Chelghoum Laïd	DZ.ML.CL	66,384
Chelia	DZ.KH.CL	4,851
Chellal	DZ.MS.CH	4,268
Chellala	DZ.EB.CL	3,745
Chellata	DZ.BJ.CL	9,648
Chemini	DZ.BJ.CM	15,410
Chemora	DZ.BT.CM	15,091
Cheniguel	DZ.MD.CG	5,734
Chentouf	DZ.AT.CT	2,444
Chéraga	DZ.AL.CH	60,374
Cheraia	DZ.SK.CH	13,788
Cherchel	DZ.TP.CR	40,763
Cheria	DZ.TB.CH	64,638
Chetaïbi	DZ.AN.CT	7,583
Chetma	DZ.BS.CH	8,677
Chetouane	DZ.TL.CH	35,116
Chettouane Belaila	DZ.SB.CB	4,880
Chettia	DZ.CH.CT	59,960
Chiffa	DZ.BL.CF	26,703
Chigara	DZ.ML.CH	13,609
Chihani	DZ.ET.CH	9,234
Chir	DZ.BT.CR	5,539
Chlef	DZ.CH.CL	146,157
Chorfa	DZ.AN.CR	9,386
Chorfa	DZ.BU.CH	14,850
Chorfa	DZ.MC.CH	2,047
Chouaiba (Ouled Rahma)	DZ.BS.CO	4,675
Chrea	DZ.BL.CR	454
Colla	DZ.BB.CO	7,963
Collo	DZ.SK.CO	31,480
Constantine	DZ.CO.CO	481,947
Corso	DZ.BM.CO	13,118
Dahmouni	DZ.TR.DA	17,392
Dahouara	DZ.GL.DA	7,791
Dahra	DZ.CH.DA	21,284
Damiat	DZ.MD.DA	3,310
Damous	DZ.TP.DA	14,432
Daoussen	DZ.BS.DA	21,212
Dar Ben Abdellah	DZ.RE.DB	2,848
Dar Chioukh	DZ.DJ.DC	24,870
Dar El Beïda	DZ.AL.DB	44,753
Darguina	DZ.BJ.DA	13,174
Dar Yaghmouracene	DZ.TL.DY	6,274
Debdeb	DZ.IL.DE	3,212
Debila	DZ.EO.DE	20,088
Dechmia	DZ.BU.DE	7,466
Dehahna	DZ.MS.DE	6,411
Dehamcha	DZ.SF.DE	9,709
Deldoul	DZ.AR.DE	7,465
Deldoul	DZ.DJ.DE	13,171
Dellys	DZ.BM.DE	28,229
Dély Ibrahim	DZ.AL.DI	30,576
Derradji Bousselah	DZ.ML.DB	10,417
Derrag	DZ.MD.DE	7,695
Deux Bassins	DZ.MD.DB	5,019
Dhaya	DZ.SB.DH	4,557
Dhayet Bendhahoua	DZ.GR.DB	9,199
Didouche Mourad	DZ.CO.DM	33,266
Dirrah	DZ.BU.DI	12,512
Djaafra	DZ.BB.DJ	9,699
Djamaa	DZ.EO.DJ	37,438
Djemorah	DZ.BS.DJ	11,218
Djanet	DZ.IL.DJ	9,699
Djasr Kasentina	DZ.AL.DK	82,729
Djebabra	DZ.BL.DJ	2,444
Djebahia	DZ.BU.DJ	14,630
Djebala	DZ.TL.DJ	9,167
Djeballah Khemissi	DZ.GL.DK	3,870
Djebel-Aissa Mimoun	DZ.TO.DA	19,227
Djebel Messaad	DZ.MS.DM	11,344
Djebilet Rosfa	DZ.TR.DR	3,929
Djelfa	DZ.DJ.DJ	164,126
Djelida	DZ.AD.DL	30,371
Djellal	DZ.KH.DJ	3,637
Djemaa Beni Habibi	DZ.JJ.DB	14,655
Djemaa Ouled Cheikh	DZ.AD.DO	6,987
Djemila	DZ.JJ.DJ	15,513
Djemila	DZ.SF.DJ	25,765
Djendel	DZ.AD.DN	26,849
Djendel Saadi Mohamed	DZ.SK.DS	7,831
Djeniane Bourzeg	DZ.NA.DB	2,301
Djerma	DZ.BT.DR	3,063
Djezzar	DZ.BT.DZ	17,657
Djidioua	DZ.RE.DJ	29,263
Djillali Ben Omar	DZ.TR.DB	5,631
Djinet	DZ.BM.DJ	20,022
Djouab	DZ.MD.DJ	16,751
Douaouda	DZ.TP.DO	17,283
Douar El Ma	DZ.EO.DM	3,527
Douéra	DZ.AL.DO	41,804
Douis	DZ.DJ.DO	10,356
Doui Thabet	DZ.SD.DT	4,315
Draâ Ben Khedda	DZ.TO.DB	28,376
Draa El Caid	DZ.BJ.DC	27,900
Draa El Mizan	DZ.TO.DM	37,628
Draa Kebila	DZ.SF.DK	15,748
Draa Essamar	DZ.MD.DS	7,465
Draria	DZ.AL.DR	23,050
Drea	DZ.SA.DR	6,255
Dréan	DZ.ET.DR	32,066
Echatt	DZ.ET.EC	26,758
El Abadia	DZ.AD.EB	33,221
El Ach	DZ.BB.EA	16,108
El Achir	DZ.BB.ER	18,149
El Achour	DZ.AL.EA	19,524
El Adjiba	DZ.BU.EJ	11,572
El-Affroun	DZ.BL.EA	37,602
El Aioun, Taref	DZ.ET.EA	4,591
El Allia	DZ.OG.EA	6,530
El Amiria	DZ.OB.EA	9,795
El Amra	DZ.AD.ER	25,890
El Amria	DZ.AT.EA	19,632
El Ancer	DZ.JJ.EN	18,738
El Ançor	DZ.OR.EA	7,929
El Anseur	DZ.BB.ES	11,170
El Aouana	DZ.JJ.EA	12,384
El Aouinet	DZ.TB.EA	19,385
El Aricha	DZ.TL.EA	5,100
El Asnam	DZ.BU.ES	12,060
El Assafia	DZ.LG.EA	4,389
El Attaf	DZ.AD.ET	50,197
El Atteuf	DZ.GR.EA	12,713
Elayadi Barbes	DZ.ML.EB	7,189
El Bayadh	DZ.EB.EY	64,632
El Biar	DZ.AL.EB	52,582
El Biod	DZ.NA.EB	6,270
El Biodh Sidi Cheikh	DZ.EB.ES	20,675
El Bnoud	DZ.EB.EN	1,195
El Bordj	DZ.MC.EB	17,874
El Borma	DZ.OG.EB	1,997
El Bouni	DZ.AN.EB	111,956
El Braya	DZ.OR.EB	3,879
El Dhaala	DZ.OB.ED	10,690
El Djazia	DZ.OB.EJ	3,318
El Eulma	DZ.AN.EE	8,711
El Eulma	DZ.SF.EU	120,068
El Fedjoudj	DZ.GL.EF	7,473
El Fedjouz Boughrara Saoudi	DZ.OB.EF	3,658
El Fehoul	DZ.TL.EF	6,778
El Feidh	DZ.BS.EF	12,482
El Flaye	DZ.BJ.EF	6,620
El Gaada	DZ.MC.ED	4,119
El Ghedir	DZ.SK.EG	6,145
El Ghicha	DZ.LG.EG	5,719
El Ghomri	DZ.MC.ER	8,585
El Ghrous	DZ.BS.EG	12,846
El Gor	DZ.TL.EG	7,754
El Guedid	DZ.DJ.EG	11,059
El Guelb El Kebir	DZ.MD.EG	14,663
El Guerrara	DZ.GR.EG	48,313
El Guettana	DZ.MC.EG	2,238
El Guettar	DZ.RE.EG	13,718
El Hacaiba	DZ.SB.EH	2,538
El Hachimia	DZ.BU.EC	13,482
El Hadaik	DZ.SK.ED	12,288
El Hadjab	DZ.BS.EJ	8,394
El Hadjadj	DZ.CH.EH	9,245
El Hadjar	DZ.AN.EH	33,878
El Hadjira	DZ.OG.EH	12,781
El Hakimia	DZ.BU.EA	2,213
El Hamadia	DZ.BB.EH	20,635
El Hamadna	DZ.RE.ED	16,990
El Hamdania	DZ.MD.EH	1,524
El Hamel	DZ.MS.EL	10,195
El Hamma	DZ.KH.EH	10,702
El Hammamet	DZ.AL.ET	19,651
El Houaita	DZ.LG.EH	1,290
El Haouch	DZ.BS.EC	4,328
El Harmilia	DZ.OB.EH	7,122
El Harrach	DZ.AL.EH	48,167
El Harrouch	DZ.SK.ER	41,650
El Hassania	DZ.AD.EH	4,389
El Hassasna	DZ.SD.EH	10,448
El Hassi	DZ.BT.EH	6,964
El Hassi	DZ.RE.ES	4,119
El Houamed	DZ.MS.ED	5,948
El-Houidjbet	DZ.TB.EH	4,431
El Idrissia	DZ.DJ.EI	21,279
El Kaf Lakhdar	DZ.MD.EK	4,054
El Kala	DZ.ET.EK	24,793
El Karimia	DZ.CH.EK	25,060
El Kennar Nouchfi	DZ.JJ.EK	13,747
El Kentara	DZ.BS.EK	9,430
El Kerma	DZ.OR.EK	13,637
El Keurt	DZ.MC.EK	3,536
El Khabouzia	DZ.BU.EK	5,552
El Kharrouba	DZ.BM.EK	8,143
El Kheiter	DZ.EB.EK	7,614
El Khemis	DZ.DJ.EK	4,769
El Kheng	DZ.LG.EK	7,064
El Khroub	DZ.CO.EK	89,919
El Kouif	DZ.TB.EK	15,777
El Kseur	DZ.BJ.EK	26,886
El Madania	DZ.AL.ED	51,404
El Madher	DZ.BT.EM	15,565
El Magharia	DZ.AL.EG	30,457
El Mahmal	DZ.KH.EM	30,484
El Main	DZ.BB.EN	6,256
El Maine	DZ.AD.EM	11,319
El Ma El Biodh	DZ.TB.EL	9,917
El Malah	DZ.AT.EL	16,162
El Mamounia	DZ.MC.EM	11,481
El Marsa	DZ.CH.EM	9,726
El Marsa	DZ.SK.EM	5,899
El Matmar	DZ.RE.EM	14,533
El Matmor	DZ.MC.ET	13,372
El Mechira	DZ.ML.EM	11,683
El Mehara	DZ.EB.EM	2,138
El Menaouer	DZ.MC.EN	9,346
El Meniaa	DZ.GR.EM	28,848
El Meridj	DZ.TB.ER	10,254
El Messaid	DZ.AT.ES	3,971
El Mezerra	DZ.TB.EZ	5,145
El M'Ghair	DZ.EO.EM	40,228
El M'Hir	DZ.BB.EM	15,160
El Milia	DZ.JJ.EM	69,163
El Mizaraa	DZ.BS.EM	7,060
El Mokrani (El Madjen)	DZ.BU.EM	4,856
El Mouradia	DZ.AL.EM	29,503
El Ogla	DZ.EO.EG	4,715
El Ogla	DZ.TB.EO	16,108
El Omaria	DZ.MD.EM	17,661
El Ouata	DZ.BC.EO	7,014
El Oued	DZ.EO.EO	105,256
El Oueldja	DZ.KH.EO	3,357
El Ouinet	DZ.MD.EN	3,366
El Ouldja	DZ.RE.EO	3,968
El-Ouldja	DZ.SF.EJ	8,921
El Ouricia	DZ.SF.ER	14,507
El Outaya	DZ.BS.EO	8,787
El Rahia	DZ.OB.ER	2,188
El Taref	DZ.ET.ET	20,362
El Youssoufia	DZ.TS.EY	2,040
Emir Abdelkader	DZ.AT.EK	3,691
Emir Abdelkader	DZ.JJ.ED	31,870
Emdjez Edchich	DZ.SK.EE	16,756
Ensigha	DZ.KH.EN	7,894
Erg Ferradj	DZ.BC.EF	4,670
Eraguene	DZ.JJ.ER	4,088
Essebt	DZ.SK.ES	15,889
Es Sénia	DZ.OR.ES	64,797
Faidh El Botma	DZ.DJ.FB	20,664
Faidja	DZ.TR.FA	5,590
Fellaoucene	DZ.TL.FE	7,619
Fenaia Maten	DZ.BJ.FM	11,995
Fenoughil	DZ.AR.FE	9,962
Feraoun	DZ.BJ.FE	15,563
Ferdjioua	DZ.ML.FE	40,441
Ferkane	DZ.TB.FE	3,537
Ferraguig	DZ.MC.FE	2,379
Fesdis	DZ.BT.FE	5,811
Filfila	DZ.SK.FI	25,149
Fkirina	DZ.OB.FK	11,413
Foggaret Ezzaouia	DZ.TM.FA	4,763
Fornaka	DZ.MG.FO	14,371
Foughala	DZ.BS.FO	9,713
Fouka	DZ.TP.FO	39,549
Foum Toub	DZ.BT.FT	5,844
Freha	DZ.TO.FH	21,997
Frenda	DZ.TR.FR	47,502
Frikat	DZ.TO.FK	12,638
Froha	DZ.MC.FR	11,969
Gdyel	DZ.OR.GD	29,999
Ghardaïa	DZ.GR.GH	87,599
Gharrous	DZ.MC.GA	3,088
Ghassoul	DZ.EB.GH	5,179
Ghazaouet	DZ.TL.GH	33,094
Ghebala	DZ.JJ.GH	5,228
Gherouaou	DZ.BL.GH	12,043
Ghessira	DZ.BT.GH	6,546
Ghilassa	DZ.BB.GH	10,959
Ghriss	DZ.MC.GR	22,151
Gosbat	DZ.BT.GO	15,778
Gouraya	DZ.TP.GO	17,165
Grarem Gouga	DZ.ML.GG	36,482
Guelal Boutaleb	DZ.SF.GB	19,886
Guelma	DZ.GL.GU	110,461
Gueltat Sidi Saad	DZ.LG.GS	10,629
Guelta Zerka	DZ.SF.GZ	14,110
Guemar	DZ.EO.GU	29,185
Guenzet	DZ.SF.GN	4,571
Guerdjoum	DZ.MC.GU	2,341
Guernini	DZ.DJ.GN	4,038
Guerrouma	DZ.BU.GU	15,306
Guertoufa	DZ.TR.GU	5,900
Guettara	DZ.DJ.GT	11,151
Guidjel	DZ.SF.GJ	27,891
Guiga	DZ.BT.GU	9,708
Guorriguer	DZ.TB.GU	5,708
Hachem	DZ.MC.EH	19,742
Hacine	DZ.MC.HA	9,176
Haddada	DZ.SA.HD	6,112
Had Echkalla	DZ.RE.HE	6,873
Hadjadj	DZ.MG.HA	15,835
Hadjera Zerga	DZ.BU.HZ	3,216
Hadj Mechri	DZ.LG.HM	6,197
Hadjout	DZ.TP.HJ	44,065
Hadjeret Ennous	DZ.TP.HE	1,739
Had Sahary	DZ.DJ.HS	22,277
Haizer	DZ.BU.HA	15,388
Hamadia	DZ.TR.HA	15,357
Hamadi Krouma	DZ.SK.HK	18,805
Hamala	DZ.ML.HA	10,810
Hamma	DZ.SF.HA	12,353
Hamma Bouziane	DZ.CO.HB	58,307
Hammedi	DZ.BM.HA	27,972
Hammam Ben Salah	DZ.ET.HB	4,871
Hammam Boughrara	DZ.TL.HB	10,322
Hammam Bouhadjar	DZ.AT.HB	29,633
Hammam Dhalaa	DZ.MS.HD	34,785
Hammam Debagh	DZ.GL.HD	13,412
Hammamet	DZ.TB.HA	15,879
Hammam Guergour	DZ.SF.HG	14,295
Hammam Melouane	DZ.BL.HM	4,551
Hammam N'Bail	DZ.GL.HN	15,854
Hammam Righa	DZ.AD.HR	7,133
Hammam Soukhna	DZ.SF.HS	11,481
Hamraia	DZ.EO.HM	3,938
Hamri	DZ.RE.HA	9,181
Hanchir Toumghani	DZ.OB.HT	18,775
Hanancha	DZ.SA.HN	16,127
Hannacha	DZ.MD.HA	5,784
Haraoua	DZ.AL.HA	18,167
Haraza	DZ.BB.HZ	5,707
Harbil	DZ.SF.HR	3,650
Harchoune	DZ.CH.HA	14,869
Hasnaoua	DZ.BB.HS	18,358
Hassaine (Beni Yahi)	DZ.MG.HB	8,835
Hassani Abdelkrim	DZ.EO.HA	17,207
Hassasna	DZ.AT.HA	3,772
Hassi Bahbah	DZ.DJ.HB	61,790
Hassi Ben Abdellah	DZ.OG.HB	3,693
Hassi Ben Okba	DZ.OR.HO	9,435
Hassi Bounif	DZ.OR.HB	44,649
Hassi Dahou	DZ.SB.HD	4,644
Hassi Delaa	DZ.LG.HD	6,930
Hassi El Euch	DZ.DJ.HE	10,834
Hassi El Ghella	DZ.AT.HG	10,487
Hassi Fedoul	DZ.DJ.HF	12,221
Hassi Fehal	DZ.GR.HF	2,164
Hassi Gara	DZ.GR.HG	13,911
Hassi Khalifa	DZ.EO.HK	25,118
Hassi Mameche	DZ.MG.HM	21,778
Hassi Mefsoukh	DZ.OR.HM	7,656
Hassi Messaoud	DZ.OG.HM	40,368
Hassi R'Mel	DZ.LG.HR	16,791
Hassi Zehana	DZ.SB.HZ	6,800
Hattatba	DZ.TP.HT	22,002
Héliopolis	DZ.GL.HE	22,605
Hennaya	DZ.TL.HE	30,592
Herenfa	DZ.CH.HE	16,356
Hidoussa	DZ.BT.HI	2,529
Hoceinia	DZ.AD.HO	7,617
Honaine	DZ.TL.HO	5,424
Hounet	DZ.SD.HO	4,097
Hussein Dey	DZ.AL.HD	49,921
Hydra	DZ.AL.HY	35,727
Ibn Ziad	DZ.CO.IZ	15,514
Iboudraren	DZ.TO.IB	6,508
Ichmoul	DZ.BT.IC	9,887
Idjeur	DZ.TO.ID	10,379
Idlès	DZ.TM.ID	3,791
Iferhounene	DZ.TO.IN	14,535
Ifigha	DZ.TO.IG	8,226
Iflissen	DZ.TO.IF	14,641
Ighil-Ali	DZ.BJ.IA	10,546
Ighrem	DZ.BJ.IG	13,711
Igli	DZ.BC.IG	5,474
Illilten	DZ.TO.IL	10,347
Illizi	DZ.IL.IL	10,163
Illoula Oumalou	DZ.TO.IO	13,812
Imsouhal	DZ.TO.IM	7,530
In Amenas	DZ.IL.IA	5,302
In Amguel	DZ.TM.IM	3,030
In Ghar	DZ.TM.IG	8,059
In Guezzam	DZ.TM.IZ	4,938
Inoughissen	DZ.BT.IN	3,919
In Salah	DZ.TM.IS	28,022
In Zghmir	DZ.AR.IZ	14,062
Irdjen	DZ.TO.IR	13,674
Issers	DZ.BM.IS	27,990
Jijel	DZ.JJ.JI	115,678
Kadiria	DZ.BU.KA	17,923
Kais	DZ.KH.KA	28,724
Kalaa	DZ.RE.KA	9,915
Kalaat Bousbaa	DZ.GL.KB	4,874
Kanoua	DZ.SK.KA	6,531
Kasdir	DZ.NA.KA	1,820
Kef Lahmar	DZ.EB.KA	5,245
Kenadsa	DZ.BC.KN	11,667
Kendira	DZ.BJ.KE	6,687
Kerkera	DZ.SK.KE	24,501
Kerzaz	DZ.BC.KZ	4,276
Khadra	DZ.MG.KA	12,294
Khalouia	DZ.MC.KH	4,984
Khams Djouamaa	DZ.MD.KD	7,588
Khatouti Sed Eldjir	DZ.MS.KS	6,689
Khedara	DZ.SA.KD	7,687
Kheïr Eddine	DZ.MG.KE	22,241
Kheïri Oued Adjoul	DZ.JJ.KA	4,612
Khelil	DZ.BB.KH	23,537
Khemis El Khechna	DZ.BM.KK	58,573
Khemis Miliana	DZ.AD.KM	74,349
Khemissa	DZ.SA.KM	3,619
Khemisti	DZ.TP.KH	12,622
Khemisti	DZ.TS.KH	20,191
Khenchela	DZ.KH.KC	87,196
Kheng Maoun	DZ.SK.KM	4,382
Khenguet Sidi Nadji	DZ.BS.KS	2,526
Kherrata	DZ.BJ.KH	31,743
Khezara	DZ.GL.KH	8,154
Khirane	DZ.KH.KR	5,350
Khoubana	DZ.MS.KH	6,848
Khraicia	DZ.AL.KH	17,690
Kimmel	DZ.BT.KI	3,014
Kolea	DZ.TP.KO	46,158
Kouas	DZ.JJ.KS	21,439
Kouba	DZ.AL.KO	105,253
Kouinine	DZ.EO.KO	7,571
Krakda	DZ.EB.KR	2,103
Ksabi	DZ.BC.KS	2,656
Ksar Bellezma	DZ.BT.KB	7,942
Ksar Chellala	DZ.TR.KC	40,423
Ksar El Abtal	DZ.SF.KA	20,667
Ksar El Boukhari	DZ.MD.KB	53,637
Ksar El Hirane	DZ.LG.KH	14,910
Ksar El Sbihi	DZ.OB.KS	11,095
Ksar Kaddour	DZ.AR.KK	3,500
Ksour	DZ.BB.KS	12,540
Labiod Medjadja	DZ.CH.LM	13,920
Lac Des Oiseaux	DZ.ET.LD	9,320
Laghouat	DZ.LG.LA	107,273
Lahlef	DZ.RE.LA	10,219
Lahmar	DZ.BC.LA	1,404
Lakhdaria	DZ.BU.LA	52,723
Larbaa	DZ.BL.LA	60,482
Larbaa	DZ.BT.LR	982
Larbaa	DZ.TS.LB	2,823
Larbaâ Nath Irathen	DZ.TO.LN	29,773
Larbatache	DZ.BM.LA	15,791
Lardjem	DZ.TS.LJ	23,151
Larhat	DZ.TP.LA	6,736
Layoune	DZ.TS.LY	20,580
Lazharia	DZ.TS.LZ	8,040
Lazrou	DZ.BT.LZ	4,598
Leghata	DZ.BM.LE	11,884
Lemsane	DZ.BT.LE	4,572
Lamtar	DZ.SB.LE	6,367
Les Eucalyptus	DZ.AL.LE	96,310
Lichana	DZ.BS.LC	8,740
Lioua	DZ.BS.LI	15,960
Maacem	DZ.TS.MA	4,671
Maadid	DZ.MS.MD	22,274
Maafa	DZ.BT.MA	2,780
Maala	DZ.BU.ML	5,806
Maamora	DZ.BU.MM	3,569
Maamora	DZ.SD.MA	5,342
Maaouia	DZ.SF.MA	8,976
Maarif	DZ.MS.MA	10,990
Maatkas	DZ.TO.MA	31,188
Madna	DZ.TR.MN	2,681
Maghnia	DZ.TL.MG	96,302
Magra	DZ.MS.MG	31,749
Magrane	DZ.EO.MA	20,102
Mocta Douz	DZ.MC.MD	8,624
Mahdia	DZ.TR.MH	30,264
Mahelma	DZ.AL.MH	14,810
Makdha	DZ.MC.MK	4,439
Makouda	DZ.TO.MD	22,548
Mansoura	DZ.BB.MA	19,979
Mansoura	DZ.GR.MA	1,765
Mansourah	DZ.MG.MA	15,641
Mansourah	DZ.TL.MN	35,697
Maoklane	DZ.SF.MK	15,201
Maoussa	DZ.MC.MA	18,104
Marsa	DZ.AL.MR	8,784
Marsa Ben M'Hidi	DZ.TL.MB	5,554
Mers El Hadjadj	DZ.OR.MH	10,284
Mascara	DZ.MC.MC	87,512
Mazouna	DZ.RE.MA	22,544
M'Chedallah	DZ.BU.MC	21,593
M'Cid	DZ.SB.MC	3,490
M'Cif	DZ.MS.MC	10,241
M'Daourouche	DZ.SA.MD	24,919
M'Doukal	DZ.BT.MD	7,213
Mecheria	DZ.NA.ME	52,898
M'Chouneche	DZ.BS.MC	9,143
Mechraa Houari Boumediene	DZ.BC.MH	3,133
Mechraa Safa	DZ.TR.MS	15,402
Mechroha	DZ.SA.MA	17,189
Mechtrass	DZ.TO.MC	11,075
Médéa	DZ.MD.MD	123,498
Mediouna	DZ.RE.MD	28,733
Medjana	DZ.BB.ME	16,112
Medjez Amar	DZ.GL.MA	6,426
Medjez Sfa	DZ.GL.MS	7,561
Medjebar	DZ.MD.MJ	5,686
Medjedel	DZ.MS.ME	18,616
Medrissa	DZ.TR.MI	13,719
Medroussa	DZ.TR.MO	9,038
Meftah	DZ.BL.ME	52,521
Meftaha	DZ.MD.MF	4,442
Megarine	DZ.OG.ME	10,996
Megheraoua	DZ.MD.MR	5,392
Meghila	DZ.TR.MG	2,648
Mekhadma	DZ.BS.MK	4,317
Mekhatria	DZ.AD.ME	14,963
Makedra	DZ.SB.MK	2,128
Mekla	DZ.TO.ML	26,315
Mekmen Ben Amar	DZ.NA.MB	3,658
Melaab	DZ.TS.ME	3,301
Melbou	DZ.BJ.ME	9,990
Mellakou	DZ.TR.ML	11,404
Menaa	DZ.BT.MN	11,855
Menaa (Ouled Atia)	DZ.MS.MO	7,167
Menaceur	DZ.TP.MC	22,684
Mendes	DZ.RE.MN	13,331
Merad	DZ.TP.MR	18,104
Merahna	DZ.SA.ME	11,030
Merdja Sidi Abed	DZ.RE.MS	6,176
Marhoum	DZ.SB.MH	4,031
Meridja	DZ.BC.ME	532
Merine	DZ.SB.MN	7,110
Merouana	DZ.BT.MR	34,788
Mers El Kebir	DZ.OR.MK	14,167
Meskiana	DZ.OB.ME	25,849
Mesra	DZ.MG.MS	20,053
Messaad	DZ.DJ.ME	77,754
Messelmoun	DZ.TP.MS	6,603
Metarfa	DZ.AR.ME	7,061
Metlili	DZ.GR.ME	33,759
Mezaourou	DZ.SB.MZ	6,658
Mezdour	DZ.BU.ME	10,723
Mezerana	DZ.MD.MZ	6,361
Mezghrane	DZ.MG.MZ	15,120
Mezloug	DZ.SF.ME	13,373
M'Hamid	DZ.MC.MH	6,062
Mih Ouansa	DZ.EO.MO	11,779
Mihoub	DZ.MD.MI	11,488
Mila	DZ.ML.MI	59,959
Miliana	DZ.AD.MI	39,662
Minar Zarza	DZ.ML.MZ	20,620
Misserghin	DZ.OR.MI	18,089
Mizrana	DZ.TO.MI	9,586
M'Kira	DZ.TO.MK	17,328
M'Lili	DZ.BS.ML	5,151
M'Liliha	DZ.DJ.ML	13,155
M'Naguer	DZ.OG.MN	11,243
Mogheul	DZ.BC.MO	682
Moghrar	DZ.NA.MO	2,796
Mohamed Belouizdad	DZ.AL.MB	59,248
Mohamed Boudiaf	DZ.MS.MB	12,366
Mohammedia	DZ.AL.MO	42,079
Mohammadia	DZ.MC.MO	71,366
Morsott	DZ.TB.MO	16,331
Mostaganem	DZ.MG.MO	130,288
Moudjebara	DZ.DJ.MO	10,365
Moulay Larbi	DZ.SD.ML	10,426
Moulay Slissen	DZ.SB.MS	5,270
Moussadek	DZ.CH.MO	5,496
Mouzaia	DZ.BL.MO	44,893
M'Rara	DZ.EO.MR	5,976
M'Sara	DZ.KH.MS	4,194
M'Sila	DZ.MS.MS	123,059
Msirda Fouaga	DZ.TL.MF	5,496
M'Sisna	DZ.BJ.MS	8,462
M'Tarfa	DZ.MS.MT	7,621
M'Toussa	DZ.KH.MT	5,538
Mustafa Ben Brahim	DZ.SB.MB	8,111
Naama	DZ.NA.NA	8,256
Naciria	DZ.BM.NA	21,272
Nador	DZ.TP.NA	8,018
Nadorah	DZ.TR.ND	7,030
Naima	DZ.TR.NM	7,569
Nakhla	DZ.EO.NA	9,491
Nechmaya	DZ.GL.NE	9,113
Nedroma	DZ.TL.NE	31,136
Negrine	DZ.TB.NE	5,891
Nekmaria	DZ.MG.NE	9,104
Nesmoth	DZ.MC.NE	4,414
Nezla	DZ.OG.NE	40,524
N'Gaous	DZ.BT.NG	25,731
N'Goussa	DZ.OG.NG	13,344
Oggaz	DZ.MC.OG	10,120
Ogla Melha	DZ.TB.OM	6,504
Oran	DZ.OR.OR	634,112
Ouacifs	DZ.TO.OC	10,497
Ouadhia	DZ.TO.OD	17,286
Ouaguenoun	DZ.TO.OG	15,645
Ouamri	DZ.MD.OU	14,724
Ouanougha	DZ.MS.ON	15,190
Ouargla	DZ.OG.OU	112,339
Ouarizane	DZ.RE.OU	18,087
Oudjana	DZ.JJ.OU	8,612
Oued Athmania	DZ.ML.OA	35,934
Oued Berkeche	DZ.AT.OB	3,773
Oued Chaaba	DZ.BT.OC	5,835
Oued Cheham	DZ.GL.OC	11,765
Oued Chorfa	DZ.AD.OC	11,960
Oued Chouly	DZ.TL.OC	4,034
Oued Djemaa	DZ.AD.OD	9,891
Oued Djer	DZ.BL.OD	5,373
Oued El Abtal	DZ.MC.OA	19,184
Oued El Alenda	DZ.EO.OA	5,839
Oued El Alleug	DZ.BL.OA	33,915
Oued El Aneb	DZ.AN.OA	17,306
Oued El Barad	DZ.SF.OB	3,013
Oued El Berdi	DZ.BU.OB	9,221
Oued El Djemaa	DZ.RE.OD	20,844
Oued El Kheir	DZ.MG.OK	14,700
Oued El Ma	DZ.BT.OM	16,947
Oued Endja	DZ.ML.OE	16,802
Oued Essalem	DZ.RE.OE	8,897
Oued Fodda	DZ.CH.OF	36,187
Oued Fragha	DZ.GL.OF	6,636
Oued Ghir	DZ.BJ.OG	15,728
Oued Goussine	DZ.CH.OG	5,439
Oued Harbil	DZ.MD.OH	4,768
Oued Keberit	DZ.SA.OK	4,770
Oued Koriche	DZ.AL.OK	53,378
Oued Lilli	DZ.TR.OL	11,834
Oued Morra	DZ.LG.OR	4,748
Oued M'Zi	DZ.LG.OZ	1,786
Oued Nini	DZ.OB.ON	4,851
Oued Rhiou	DZ.RE.OR	54,435
Oued Sebaa	DZ.SB.OB	3,863
Oued Sebbah	DZ.AT.OS	9,478
Oued Sefioun	DZ.SB.OF	5,343
Oued Seguen	DZ.ML.OS	11,792
Oued Sly	DZ.CH.OS	41,245
Oued Smar	DZ.AL.OS	21,397
Oued Taga	DZ.BT.OT	16,154
Oued Taourira	DZ.SB.OT	839
Oued Taria	DZ.MC.OT	13,916
Oued Tlelat	DZ.OR.OT	13,289
Oued Zenati	DZ.GL.OZ	27,254
Oued Z'hor	DZ.SK.OZ	6,602
Oued Zitoun	DZ.ET.OZ	5,321
Ouenza	DZ.TB.OU	45,881
Ouzera	DZ.MD.OZ	11,491
Ouillen	DZ.SA.OU	6,419
Ouldja Boulballout	DZ.SK.OB	4,045
Ouled Abbes	DZ.CH.OA	7,330
Ouled Addi Guebala	DZ.MS.OA	22,369
Ouled Addouane	DZ.SF.OA	7,998
Ouled Ahmed Temmi	DZ.AR.OT	11,976
Ouled Aissa	DZ.AR.OA	5,497
Ouled Aissa	DZ.BM.OA	6,773
Ouled Ammar	DZ.BT.OA	7,006
Ouled Antar	DZ.MD.OA	2,033
Ouled Aouf	DZ.BT.OO	1,411
Ouled Attia	DZ.SK.OA	10,351
Ouled Ben Abdelkader	DZ.CH.OB	17,385
Ouled Bessem	DZ.TS.OB	9,325
Ouled Bouachra	DZ.MD.OC	1,446
Ouled Boudjemaa	DZ.AT.OJ	5,322
Ouled Boughalem	DZ.MG.OB	11,886
Ouled Brahem	DZ.BB.OB	7,348
Ouled Brahim	DZ.MD.OB	9,870
Ouled Brahim	DZ.SD.OB	18,406
Ouled Chebel	DZ.AL.OC	16,335
Ouled Dahmane	DZ.BB.OD	14,777
Ouled Deide	DZ.MD.OD	4,770
Ouled Derradj	DZ.MS.OJ	22,851
Ouled Djellal	DZ.BS.OD	45,622
Ouled Driss	DZ.SA.OD	11,896
Ouled Fadhel	DZ.BT.OF	9,882
Ouled Fares	DZ.CH.OR	30,068
Ouled Fayet	DZ.AL.OF	15,209
Ouled Gacem	DZ.OB.OG	6,273
Ouled Hamla	DZ.OB.OH	11,019
Ouled Hbaba	DZ.SK.OH	7,959
Ouled Hedadj	DZ.BM.OH	22,382
Ouled Hellal	DZ.MD.OL	3,062
Ouled Khaled	DZ.SD.OK	19,368
Ouled Khalouf	DZ.ML.OK	11,058
Ouled Khoudir	DZ.BC.OK	3,893
Ouled Kihel	DZ.AT.OK	3,064
Ouled Malah	DZ.MG.OM	8,948
Ouled Maaref	DZ.MD.OM	9,415
Ouled Madhi	DZ.MS.OD	6,525
Ouled Mansour	DZ.MS.OM	4,896
Ouled Mimoun	DZ.TL.OM	24,350
Ouled Moumen	DZ.SA.OM	5,688
Ouled Moussa	DZ.BM.OM	26,108
Ouled Rabah	DZ.JJ.OR	10,142
Ouled Rached	DZ.BU.OR	8,553
Ouled Rahmoune	DZ.CO.OR	20,434
Ouled Rechache	DZ.KH.OR	22,509
Ouled Riyah	DZ.TL.OR	3,973
Ouled Sabor	DZ.SF.OS	10,005
Ouled Said	DZ.AR.OS	7,538
Ouled Sellem	DZ.BT.OL	17,866
Ouled Si Ahmed	DZ.SF.OD	9,456
Ouled Sidi Brahim	DZ.BB.OS	2,648
Ouled Sidi Brahim	DZ.MS.OB	10,188
Ouled Sidi Mihoub	DZ.RE.OS	6,646
Ouled Si Slimane	DZ.BT.OS	11,406
Ouled Slama	DZ.BL.OS	15,956
Ouled Slimane	DZ.MS.OS	2,070
Ouled Tebben	DZ.SF.OT	9,482
Ouled Yahia Khadrouche	DZ.JJ.OY	17,599
Ouled Aiche	DZ.RE.OY	9,075
Ouled Yaiche	DZ.BL.OY	55,719
Ouled Zouaï	DZ.OB.OZ	4,578
Oulhaca El Gheraba	DZ.AT.OG	15,031
Oultene	DZ.MS.OT	1,763
Oumache	DZ.BS.OM	8,175
Oum Ali	DZ.TB.OA	2,985
Oum Drou	DZ.CH.OD	17,314
Oum El Adhaim	DZ.SA.OA	7,696
Oum El Assel	DZ.TN.OA	1,794
Oum El Bouaghi	DZ.OB.OB	59,962
Oum El Djalil	DZ.MD.OE	3,664
Oum Laadham	DZ.DJ.OL	13,696
Oum Toub	DZ.SK.OT	31,051
Oum Touyour	DZ.EO.OT	9,735
Ourlal	DZ.BS.OR	5,820
Ourmes	DZ.EO.OU	5,059
Ouyoun El Assafir	DZ.BT.OE	8,969
Ouzzelaguen	DZ.BJ.OU	21,547
Rabta	DZ.BB.RA	10,529
Ragouba	DZ.SA.RA	5,055
Rahmania	DZ.AL.RA	5,759
Rahouia	DZ.TR.RA	19,644
Rais Hamidou	DZ.AL.RH	21,518
Ramdane Djamel	DZ.SK.RD	23,482
Ramka	DZ.RE.RA	5,215
Raml Souk	DZ.ET.RS	3,715
Raouraoua	DZ.BU.RA	7,209
Ras Ain Amirouche	DZ.MC.RA	6,183
Ras El Agba	DZ.GL.RA	2,348
Ras El Aioun	DZ.BT.RA	18,791
Ras El Ma	DZ.SB.RM	14,862
Ras El Oued	DZ.BB.RO	42,345
Ras Miaad (Ouled Sassi)	DZ.BS.RM	6,053
Rechaiga	DZ.TR.RE	15,709
Redjem Demouche	DZ.SB.RD	2,358
Reggane	DZ.AR.RE	14,179
Reghaia	DZ.AL.RE	66,215
Reguiba	DZ.EO.RE	30,392
Rehbat	DZ.BT.RE	9,051
Relizane	DZ.RE.RE	111,186
Remchi	DZ.TL.RE	39,525
Remila	DZ.KH.RE	5,740
Ridane	DZ.BU.RI	3,029
Robbah	DZ.EO.RO	17,243
Rogassa	DZ.EB.RO	5,598
Roknia	DZ.GL.RO	10,114
Rasfa	DZ.SF.RO	14,025
Rouached	DZ.ML.RO	25,399
Roubia	DZ.MD.RO	7,223
Rouïba	DZ.AL.RO	49,881
Rouina	DZ.AD.RO	17,437
Rouissat	DZ.OG.RO	37,814
Sabra	DZ.TL.SB	24,622
Safel El Ouiden	DZ.SA.SO	3,004
Safsaf	DZ.MG.SF	12,492
Safsaf El Ouesra	DZ.TB.SS	5,531
Saharidj	DZ.BU.SA	9,142
Saïda	DZ.SD.SD	115,166
Salah Bey	DZ.SF.SB	21,855
Salah Bouchaour	DZ.SK.SB	25,933
Sali	DZ.AR.SA	11,304
Saneg	DZ.MD.SA	3,120
Saoula	DZ.AL.SA	31,388
Sayada	DZ.MG.SY	21,900
Sebaa	DZ.AR.SE	1,989
Sebaine	DZ.TR.SE	10,042
Sebaa Chioukh	DZ.TL.SC	4,259
Sebdou	DZ.TL.SE	35,836
Sebgag	DZ.LG.SE	6,107
Sebseb	DZ.GR.SE	2,428
Sebt	DZ.TR.ST	1,283
Seddouk	DZ.BJ.SE	19,064
Sedjerara	DZ.MC.SJ	7,819
Sed Rahal	DZ.DJ.SR	11,812
Sedrata	DZ.SA.SE	47,297
Sedraia	DZ.MD.SY	7,070
Sefiane	DZ.BT.SF	11,939
Seggana	DZ.BT.SG	4,673
Seghouane	DZ.MD.SG	7,599
Sehailia	DZ.MC.SH	8,500
Sehala Thaoura	DZ.SB.ST	2,322
Sellaoua Announa	DZ.GL.SA	3,001
Selma Benziada	DZ.JJ.SB	1,564
Selmana	DZ.DJ.SE	14,008
Sendjas	DZ.CH.SE	26,228
Seraidi	DZ.AN.SE	7,193
Serdj El Ghoul	DZ.SF.SG	11,044
Serghine	DZ.TR.SN	5,303
Seriana	DZ.BT.SR	11,714
Sétif	DZ.SF.SE	239,195
Settara	DZ.JJ.SE	13,748
Sfissef	DZ.SB.SF	28,346
Sfissifa	DZ.NA.SF	2,633
Si Abdelghani	DZ.TR.SG	9,015
Sidi Abdelaziz	DZ.JJ.SA	9,091
Sidi Abdeldjebar	DZ.MC.SD	3,760
Sidi Abdelli	DZ.TL.SA	16,500
Sidi Abdelmoumene	DZ.MC.SM	13,306
Sidi Abderrahmane	DZ.CH.SR	3,630
Sidi Abderrahmane	DZ.TR.SR	7,082
Sidi Abed	DZ.TS.SA	5,298
Sidi Ahmed	DZ.SD.SA	12,205
Sidi-Aich	DZ.BJ.SA	11,373
Sidi Aissa	DZ.MS.SD	57,270
Sidi Akkacha	DZ.CH.SK	23,374
Sidi Ali	DZ.MG.SA	31,840
Sidi Ali Benyoub	DZ.SB.SA	10,567
Sidi Ali Boussidi	DZ.SB.SI	8,373
Sidi Ali Mellal	DZ.TR.SM	7,297
Sidi Amar	DZ.AN.SA	72,889
Sidi Amar	DZ.SD.SR	7,715
Sidi Amar	DZ.TP.SA	10,906
Sidi Ameur	DZ.EB.SA	2,685
Sidi Ameur	DZ.MS.SA	18,721
Sidi Amrane	DZ.EO.SM	18,732
Sidi Aoun	DZ.EO.SA	10,018
Sidi Ayad	DZ.BJ.SD	5,059
Sidi Baizid	DZ.DJ.SB	11,360
Sidi Bakhti	DZ.TR.SB	6,376
Sidi Bel Abbès	DZ.SB.SB	186,879
Sidi Bellater	DZ.MG.SB	6,670
Sidi Ben Adda	DZ.AT.SA	12,224
Sidi Ben Yebka	DZ.OR.SB	5,893
Sidi Boubekeur	DZ.SD.SB	17,131
Sidi Boumediene	DZ.AT.SB	2,899
Sidi Boussaid	DZ.MC.SB	4,428
Sidi Boutouchent	DZ.TS.SB	3,656
Sidi Bouzid	DZ.LG.SB	3,864
Sidi Brahim	DZ.SB.SM	8,464
Sidi Chami	DZ.OR.SC	58,857
Sidi Chaib	DZ.SB.SC	4,237
Sidi Dahou Zair	DZ.SB.SD	4,650
Sidi Damed	DZ.MD.SD	3,784
Sidi Daoud	DZ.BM.SD	14,889
Sidi Djilali	DZ.TL.SD	5,229
Sidi Embarek	DZ.BB.SE	10,281
Sidi Fredj	DZ.SA.SF	7,949
Sidi Ghiles	DZ.TP.SG	12,731
Sidi Hadjeres	DZ.MS.SH	6,774
Sidi Hamadouche	DZ.SB.SH	9,264
Sidi Hosni	DZ.TR.SH	7,610
Sidi Kada	DZ.MC.SK	17,843
Sidi Khaled	DZ.BS.SK	35,277
Sidi Khaled	DZ.SB.SK	6,227
Sidi Khelifa	DZ.ML.SK	4,505
Sidi Khelil	DZ.EO.SK	5,524
Sidi Khettab	DZ.RE.SK	12,594
Sidi Khouiled	DZ.OG.SK	4,309
Sidi Ladjel	DZ.DJ.SL	11,776
Sidi Lahcene	DZ.SB.SL	15,016
Sidi Lakhdar	DZ.AD.SL	16,902
Sidi Lakhdar	DZ.MG.SL	30,950
Sidi Lantri	DZ.TS.SL	4,945
Sidi Lazreg	DZ.RE.SL	5,575
Sidi Makhlouf	DZ.LG.SM	8,061
Sidi Maarouf	DZ.JJ.SM	19,314
Sidi Medjahed	DZ.TL.SM	6,431
Sidi Merouane	DZ.ML.SM	20,018
Sidi Mezghiche	DZ.SK.SM	21,071
Sidi M'Hamed	DZ.AL.SH	90,455
Sidi M'Hamed	DZ.MS.SM	6,225
Sidi M'hamed Ben Ali	DZ.RE.SB	17,072
Sidi M'hamed Benaouda	DZ.RE.SM	6,159
Sidi Moussa	DZ.AL.SM	27,888
Sidi Naamane	DZ.MD.SN	21,478
Sidi Naamane	DZ.TO.SN	9,641
Sidi Okba	DZ.BS.SO	26,139
Sidi Ouriache (Tadmaya)	DZ.AT.SO	5,540
Sidi Rabai	DZ.MD.SR	5,061
Sidi Rached	DZ.TP.SR	9,153
Sidi Saada	DZ.RE.SS	14,479
Sidi Safi	DZ.AT.SS	6,346
Sidi Semiane	DZ.TP.SS	2,978
Sidi Slimane	DZ.EB.SS	1,563
Sidi Slimane	DZ.OG.SS	6,822
Sidi Slimane	DZ.TS.SS	7,328
Sidi Taifour	DZ.EB.ST	2,930
Sidi Yacoub	DZ.SB.SY	3,971
Sidi Zahar	DZ.MD.SH	8,018
Sidi Ziane	DZ.MD.SZ	3,282
Si El Mahdjoub	DZ.MD.SM	7,596
Sig	DZ.MC.SI	60,783
Sigus	DZ.OB.SI	14,944
Si Mustapha	DZ.BM.SM	9,015
Sirat	DZ.MG.SI	17,979
Skikda	DZ.SK.SK	156,680
Slim	DZ.MS.SL	5,777
Smaoun	DZ.BJ.SM	13,157
Sobha	DZ.CH.SO	28,646
Souaflia	DZ.MG.SO	14,356
Souagui	DZ.MD.SO	19,059
Souahlia	DZ.TL.SH	20,823
Souamaa	DZ.MS.SO	6,424
Souamaa	DZ.TO.SO	10,932
Souani	DZ.TL.SN	8,227
Souarekh	DZ.ET.SO	7,457
Sougueur	DZ.TR.SO	64,970
Souhan	DZ.BL.SH	1,920,233
Souidania	DZ.AL.SO	11,620
Souk Ahras	DZ.SA.SA	116,745
Souk El Haad	DZ.BM.SH	4,860
Souk El Had	DZ.RE.SH	3,351
Souk El Khemis	DZ.BU.SK	8,039
Souk El Tenine	DZ.BJ.ST	11,762
Souk El Thenine	DZ.TO.ST	13,914
Souk Naamane	DZ.OB.SN	23,018
Souk Oufella	DZ.BJ.SO	9,776
Souk Tlata	DZ.TL.ST	2,886
Soumaa	DZ.BL.SM	31,451
Sour	DZ.MG.SR	20,625
Sour El Ghouzlane	DZ.BU.SG	42,179
Stah Guentis	DZ.TB.SG	2,914
Staouéli	DZ.AL.ST	38,915
Stidia	DZ.MG.ST	10,688
Still	DZ.EO.ST	3,545
Stitten	DZ.EB.SN	4,495
Tabelbala	DZ.BC.TB	4,663
Tabia	DZ.SB.TB	4,886
Tablat	DZ.MD.TB	28,276
Tacheta Zegagha	DZ.AD.TZ	19,711
Tachouda	DZ.SF.TC	7,735
Tadjemout	DZ.LG.TM	20,321
Tadjena	DZ.CH.TJ	22,155
Tadjenanet	DZ.ML.TA	43,151
Tadjrouna	DZ.LG.TR	3,597
Tadmait	DZ.TO.TA	21,547
Tadmit	DZ.DJ.TA	6,172
Tafissour	DZ.SB.TF	1,864
Tafraoui	DZ.OR.TA	9,988
Tafraout	DZ.MD.TF	7,722
Tafreg	DZ.BB.TF	1,991
Tagdemt	DZ.TR.TG	4,090
Taghit	DZ.BC.TA	6,047
Teghalimet	DZ.SB.TG	6,913
Taghzout	DZ.BU.TZ	11,940
Taghzout	DZ.EO.TA	11,147
Taglait	DZ.BB.TG	5,042
Taguedit	DZ.BU.TD	10,277
Taher	DZ.JJ.TA	67,095
Taibet	DZ.OG.TA	14,322
Takhemaret	DZ.TR.TK	29,835
Tala Hamza	DZ.BJ.TH	10,252
Talaifacene	DZ.SF.TI	17,555
Taleb Larbi	DZ.EO.TL	3,582
Talkhamt	DZ.BT.TL	17,728
Talmine	DZ.AR.TL	9,469
Tamalous	DZ.SK.TA	39,346
Tamantit	DZ.AR.TN	7,912
Tamekten	DZ.AR.TA	14,134
Tamalaht	DZ.TS.TA	7,493
Tamenghasset	DZ.TM.TM	72,741
Tamest	DZ.AR.TE	6,658
Tamezguida	DZ.MD.TM	4,964
Tamlouka	DZ.GL.TA	16,640
Tamokra	DZ.BJ.TA	5,159
Tamridjet	DZ.BJ.TJ	8,838
Tamsa	DZ.MS.TS	6,284
Tamtert	DZ.BC.TT	1,302
Tamza	DZ.KH.TM	8,580
Tamzoura	DZ.AT.TA	8,665
Taouila	DZ.LG.TA	2,634
Taoudmout	DZ.SB.TO	1,991
Taougrit	DZ.CH.TG	24,267
Taoura	DZ.SA.TA	17,337
Taourga	DZ.BM.TA	7,303
Taourit Ighil	DZ.BJ.TI	7,083
Taouzient	DZ.KH.TA	9,794
Tarik Ibn-Ziad	DZ.AD.TI	9,739
Tarmount	DZ.MS.TR	9,438
Taskriout	DZ.BJ.TK	14,635
Tassadane Haddada	DZ.ML.TH	17,623
Tessala	DZ.SB.TS	6,711
Taxlent	DZ.BT.TX	7,875
Taya	DZ.SF.TY	9,346
Tazgait	DZ.MG.TA	8,763
Tazmalt	DZ.BJ.TZ	25,974
Tazoult	DZ.BT.TZ	22,114
Tazrouk	DZ.TM.TA	3,033
Tebesbest	DZ.OG.TB	29,840
Tébessa	DZ.TB.TE	161,440
Telaa	DZ.SF.TE	6,826
Telagh	DZ.SB.TL	20,880
Telassa	DZ.CH.TL	10,175
Teleghma	DZ.ML.TE	40,846
Temacine	DZ.OG.TM	15,933
Tenedla	DZ.EO.TE	8,033
Ténès	DZ.CH.TN	34,332
Teniet El Abed	DZ.BT.TA	10,471
Teniet En Nasr	DZ.BB.TN	6,808
Tenira	DZ.SB.TN	9,413
Terga	DZ.AT.TE	7,165
Terny Beni Hdiel	DZ.TL.TB	4,637
Terraguelt	DZ.SA.TE	4,621
Terrai Bainen	DZ.ML.TB	20,685
Tesmart	DZ.BB.TE	5,269
Tessala-El-Merdja	DZ.AL.TM	10,792
Tessala Lemtai	DZ.ML.TL	13,849
Texenna	DZ.JJ.TE	14,974
Tlidjene	DZ.TB.TH	7,649
Thenia	DZ.BM.TH	19,078
Theniet El Had	DZ.TS.TH	28,788
Tlatet Eddouair	DZ.MD.TD	7,623
Tienet	DZ.TL.TI	4,686
Tiaret	DZ.TR.TR	165,899
Tibane	DZ.BJ.TB	5,368
Tiberguent	DZ.ML.TI	8,286
Tiberkanine	DZ.AD.TB	14,907
Tichy	DZ.BJ.TC	14,350
Tidda	DZ.TR.TD	3,476
Tidjelabine	DZ.BM.TJ	13,888
Tiffech	DZ.SA.TI	5,713
Tifra	DZ.BJ.TF	8,547
Tighanimine	DZ.BT.TN	3,787
Tigharghar	DZ.BT.TG	6,066
Tighenif	DZ.MC.TG	55,800
Tigzirt	DZ.TO.TZ	10,414
Tilatou	DZ.BT.TT	2,367
Tilmouni	DZ.SB.TI	7,154
Timezrit	DZ.BJ.TM	22,392
Timezrit	DZ.BM.TM	10,699
Timgad	DZ.BT.TM	10,937
Timiaouine	DZ.AR.TI	4,206
Timizart	DZ.TO.TM	27,878
Timmimoun	DZ.AR.TM	28,595
Timoudi	DZ.BC.TI	2,116
Tindouf	DZ.TN.TI	25,266
Tinedbar	DZ.BJ.TD	6,083
Tinerkouk	DZ.AR.TK	13,393
Tin Zaouatine	DZ.TM.TZ	2,314
Tiout	DZ.NA.TI	3,161
Tipaza	DZ.TP.TI	21,915
Tircine	DZ.SD.TI	6,307
Tirmitine	DZ.TO.TT	18,030
Tissemsilt	DZ.TS.TI	61,155
Tit	DZ.AR.TT	3,160
Tixter	DZ.BB.TI	9,493
Tizi	DZ.MC.TZ	10,915
Tizi Ghenif	DZ.TO.TG	27,702
Tizi N'Bechar	DZ.SF.TN	18,719
Tizi-N'Berber	DZ.BJ.TN	12,964
Tizi N'Tleta	DZ.TO.TN	15,891
Tizi Ouzou	DZ.TO.TO	117,259
Tizi Rached	DZ.TO.TR	16,861
T Kout	DZ.BT.TK	10,629
Tlemcen	DZ.TL.TL	132,341
Tolga	DZ.BS.TO	42,316
Touahria	DZ.MG.TO	6,674
Toudja	DZ.BJ.TO	10,659
Touggourt	DZ.OG.TO	32,940
Tousmouline	DZ.EB.TO	2,050
Tousnina	DZ.TR.TO	10,955
Treat	DZ.AN.TR	5,089
Trifaoui	DZ.EO.TR	6,361
Tsabit	DZ.AR.TS	11,832
Yabous	DZ.KH.YA	8,868
Yahia Beniguecha	DZ.ML.YB	10,681
Yakouren	DZ.TO.YK	11,724
Yatafene	DZ.TO.YT	4,957
Yellel	DZ.RE.YE	34,010
Youb	DZ.SD.YO	15,314
Zaafrane	DZ.DJ.ZF	12,865
Zaarouria	DZ.SA.ZA	10,665
Zaccar	DZ.DJ.ZC	3,142
Zahana	DZ.MC.ZA	18,839
Zanet El Beida	DZ.BT.ZB	9,265
Zaouia El Abidia	DZ.OG.ZA	15,381
Zaouiet Kounta	DZ.AR.ZK	14,531
Zarzour	DZ.MS.ZA	1,876
Zbarbar (El Isseri)	DZ.BU.ZB	4,525
Zeboudja	DZ.CH.ZE	23,079
Zeddine	DZ.AD.ZE	10,853
Zeghaia	DZ.ML.ZE	15,751
Zekri	DZ.TO.ZE	3,666
Zelfana	DZ.GR.ZE	7,241
Zemmoura	DZ.RE.ZM	25,272
Zemmouri	DZ.BM.ZE	21,012
Zenata	DZ.TL.ZE	3,190
Zeralda	DZ.AL.ZE	33,047
Zerdeza	DZ.SK.ZE	12,258
Zeribet El Oued	DZ.BS.ZO	16,379
Zerizer	DZ.ET.ZE	10,105
Zerouala	DZ.SB.ZE	4,333
Ziama Mansouriah	DZ.JJ.ZM	11,945
Zighoud Youcef	DZ.CO.ZY	31,101
Zitouna	DZ.ET.ZI	8,367
Zitouna	DZ.SK.ZI	8,415
Zmalet El Emir Abdelkader	DZ.TR.ZE	14,668
Zorg	DZ.OB.ZO	1,736
Zouabi	DZ.SA.ZO	3,332
Zoubiria	DZ.MD.ZO	15,009
Total	-	29,133,469

== See also ==
- List of cities in Algeria
- Cities of present-day nations and states
