= Barika Province =

Barika Province ولاية بريكة ⴰⴳⴻⵣⴷⵓ ⵏ ⴱⴰⵔⵉⴽⴰ
- Province
- Map of Barika Province
- Coordinates: 35°23′50″N 5°21′57″E
- Country: Algeria
- Created: 2026
- Capital: Barika

Area
  - Total: 3,700 km^{2} (1,400 sq mi)

Population (2008)
  - Total: 179,210
  - Density: 48/km^{2} (130/sq mi)
- Time zone: UTC+01 (CET)
- Area code: +213
- ISO 3166 code: DZ-60
- Districts: 3
- Municipalities: 8

Barika Province (Arabic: ولاية بريكة, romanized: Wilāyat Barīka) is a province (wilaya) in eastern Algeria; its provincial capital is Barika. It was created in 2026 by separation from Batna Province.

The province lies in the transition zone between the densely populated north and the sparsely populated south of the country; it covers an area of about 3,700 km².

Around 180,000 people lived in the province at the 2008 census, giving it a population density of about 48 inhabitants per square kilometre.

== Administrative divisions ==
The wilaya of Barika is divided into 8 communes, grouped into 3 districts (daïras).

Daïras	Communes	
Daïras	Name	Pop. 2008
Barika	Barika	104,388
Barika	Bitam	11,855
Barika	Amdoukal	9,010
Seggana	Seggana	5,769
Seggana	Tilatou	3,004
Djezzar	Djezzar	22,124
Djezzar	Abdelkader Azil	14,304
Djezzar	Ouled Ammar	8,756
