= Ras El Aioun District =

Coordinates: 35°40′25″N 5°39′00″E

Ras El Aioun
- District
- Country: Algeria
- Province: Batna Province

Area
  - Total: 350 sq mi (910 km^{2})

Population (1998)
  - Total: 130,000
  - Density: 290/sq mi (111/km^{2})
  - Languages: Chaouïa 80%; Arabic 90%
- Time zone: UTC+1 (CET)

Ras El Aioun is a district of Batna Province, Algeria. In 2008, the district's population was estimated to be around 130,000. Ras El Aioun is located on the Mediterranean Sea and in the north-central portion of Algeria.

Ras El aioun had been inhabited by tribes of Oulad Ali Ben Sabour and Oulad salame for several hundred years, later some French colonists arrived to the district in the French conquest period.

The district has a diverse geography. It is bordered by Ain Azel and EL Eulma to the north and N'gaou and Oulad Si Slimane to the south. It is also bordered by Merouana and Ain Djasser to the east and Djezzar and Salah Bey to the west .

Ras El Aioun district covers 910 km^{2} with a density of 111/km^{2} . The district's geographic area is dominated by meadows, forests, rivers, apricot gardens and mountains.

== Municipalities ==
The district further divides into seven municipalities.

- Ras El Aioun
- Djezar
- Gosbat
- Guigba
- Ouled Sellam
- Rahbat
- Talkhamt

== History ==
=== In the French conquest period ===
Before 1957 the 6 cities formed a shared city called Belezma, by 1958 some colonies started to appear in the area such as Ras El Aioun, Guigba, Oulad Salame and Rahbat.

=== In the independence period ===
After Algeria won its independence and exactly in 1964 some cities are put together as one big Comune ( Ras El Aioun, Guigba and Rahbat become Ras El Aioun Comune) (Oulad Salame and Talkhamt become one).

In December 1984 the six comunes were recreated again as independent comunes .

In 1987 the district of Ras El Aioun was created to contain six comunes (Ras El Aioun, Oulad Salam, Guigba, Gosbat, Rahbat and Talkhamt)
