= Arris, Batna =

Arris Arabic: آريس Berber: ⴰⵔⵔⵉⵙ
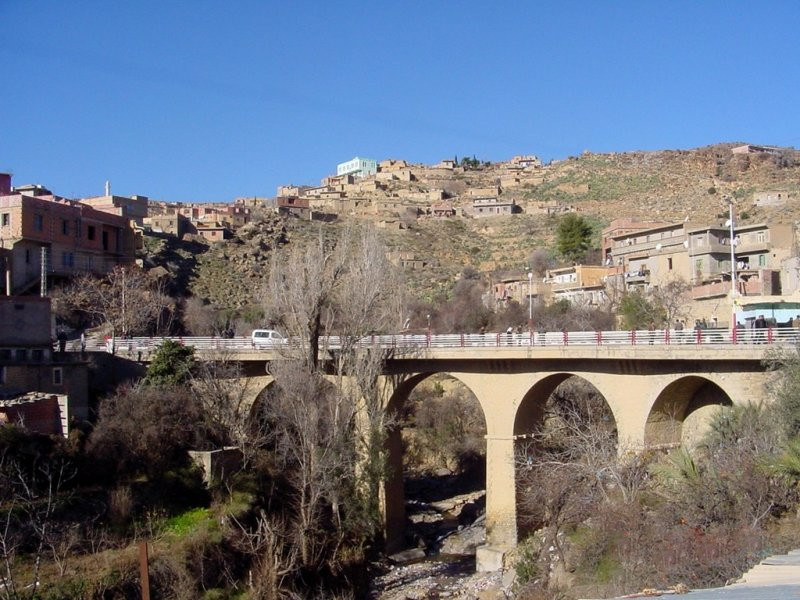
- View of one of the bridges in the city of Arris

- Location of Arris within Batna wilaya

- Location of Arris within Algeria
- Coordinates: 35°15′N 6°21′E
- Country: Algeria
- Wilaya: Batna
- Daïra: Arris

Area
  - Total: 152 km^{2} (59 sq mi)
- Highest elevation: 1,100 m (3,600 ft)
- Lowest elevation: 900 m (3,000 ft)

Population (2011)
  - Total: 32,597
  - Density: 214/km^{2} (550/sq mi)
- Time zone: UTC+1 (West Africa Time)
- Climate: BSk

Arris (Arabic: آريس; Berber languages: ⴰⵔⵔⵉⵙ) is a commune in the Batna wilaya in eastern Algeria.

== Geography ==
=== Location ===
The Arris commune's jurisdiction is located in the Southwest of the Batna wilaya.

=== Arris Localities ===
The Arris commune is made up of 15 neighborhoods:

- Afra
- Anza Ahmed
- Aourdaddam
- Arris
- Bouyeghiel
- Dechera El Hamra
- Khenguet Zerouala
- Khenguet Zidane
- Laraddam
- Merj Hamed
- Ras Draa
- T'Zaouket
- Tamayoult
- Tibhirine

=== Physical Geography ===
The city of Arris is located at an altitude of 1100 m in the highlands of Oued El Abiod, between the Djebel Zellatou to the east, Djebel Ichmoul to the north (Aïn Tinn pass at 1800 m), and Djebel El Azreg to the west.

=== Human Geography ===
Arris is connected to Biskra and Batna by Route Nationale 31, which passes through the Aïn Tinn pass; a secondary route connects Arris to Baâli (Teniet El Abed) in the valley of Oued Abdi.

== Toponymy ==
Arris means "white lands" or "lion cub" in the Chaoui Berber language spoken in the Aurès Mountains.

== History ==
=== Antiquity ===
The city is very ancient. Arris was the capital of the Gaetuli Berbers who rose up against Rome. At the time, historians called them Moors. They were a people who had lived in the region for a long time.

After the fall of the Roman empire, Masties became an independent ruler of the Kingdom of the Aurès. In an inscription discovered in Arris, dating to the end of the 5th century to the mid-6th century, he proclaims his Christian faith and the title of Imperator during his rule until 516 AD.

=== Middle Ages ===
The arrival of the Vandals in the region has been confirmed by historians, but Masties escaped their conquest and a monument erected pays homage to the Masties's memory, "inflexibly loyal to the Roman ideal and to the forms of imperial government," according to Jérôme Carcopino.

Among the other princes and leaders in the Aurès, Tacfarinas was a rebel leader. Cutzinas was a rebel leader; he had a Roman mother according to Corippus. The two historical figures in the Aurès region at the beginning of the Muslim Conquest of North Africa were Kusaila of the Awraba tribe^{[fr]} and Dihya, queen of the Jarawa tribe, known as al-Kāhina.

=== French Colonization ===
On December 18, 1886, the mixed commune (commune mixte^{[fr]} - an area where Europeans were present though in very small numbers) of Aurès was created in the Batna arrondissement (district) of the Constantine département of French Algeria, with its capital in Arris.

Arris was therefore the residence of the chief administrator, assisted by two assistants, a secretary, and other employees (for example, messengers). This mixed commune was divided into douars, each under the responsibility of a "native assistant" ("adjoint indigène") - "qaid" from 1919 on. In 1936, the mixed commune comprised fourteen douars and a "center of colonization" (Foum Toub).

The ethnologists Thérèse Rivière^{[fr]} and Germaine Tillion, who spent much time in the Aurès region from 1934 to 1940, make reference to Arris in the 1930s in their articles and reports regarding the Aurès: Connected to Batna by a route with a regular bus line, the city contained a clinic and a primary school, but no business. It was connected to Biskra by motorway. The police force of Arris was six men strong for a population of 60,000 inhabitants of the Aurès region.

=== The Algerian War ===
One of the nine founders of the National Liberation Front (FLN) in October 1954, Mostefa Ben Boulaïd was born to a notable family in Arris. Militant in the Algerian People's Party (PPA), then in the Movement for the Triumph of Democratic Liberties (MTLD), he was in charge of the Aurès zone from October 1954 until his death in March 1956; his immediate successor was his brother, Omar Ben Boulaïd.

On November 1, 1954, the day of the Toussaint Rouge, the insurgents managed to isolate Arris for several hours.

On June 28, 1956, during the French government's administrative reorganization of Algeria, Batna became a prefecture and Arris a sub-prefecture; several douars became communes: Bouzina, Chir, Kimmel, M'chouneche, Menaa, Oulach, Tadjmout et Tighanimine.

=== Independence ===
The communes of Arris and Tighanimine form the daïra of Arris, one of 21 daïras in the wilaya of Batna.

== Demographics ==
Population of the Arris Commune from 1966 to 2008

Year	Pop.	±%
1966	10,699	—
1977	14,996	+40.2%
1984	18,000	+20.0%

Year	Pop.	±%
1998	24,607	+36.7%
2008	30,207	+22.8%

== Sports ==
Every year, the Chahid Mostefa Ben Boulaïd half-marathon takes place in the city.

== Notable people ==
- Mostefa Ben Boulaïd (1917–1956), one of the founders of the FLN (Front de libération nationale), was born in Arris.
