= Merouana =

Merouana مروانة ⵜⴰⵎⴻⵔⵡⴰⵏⵜ
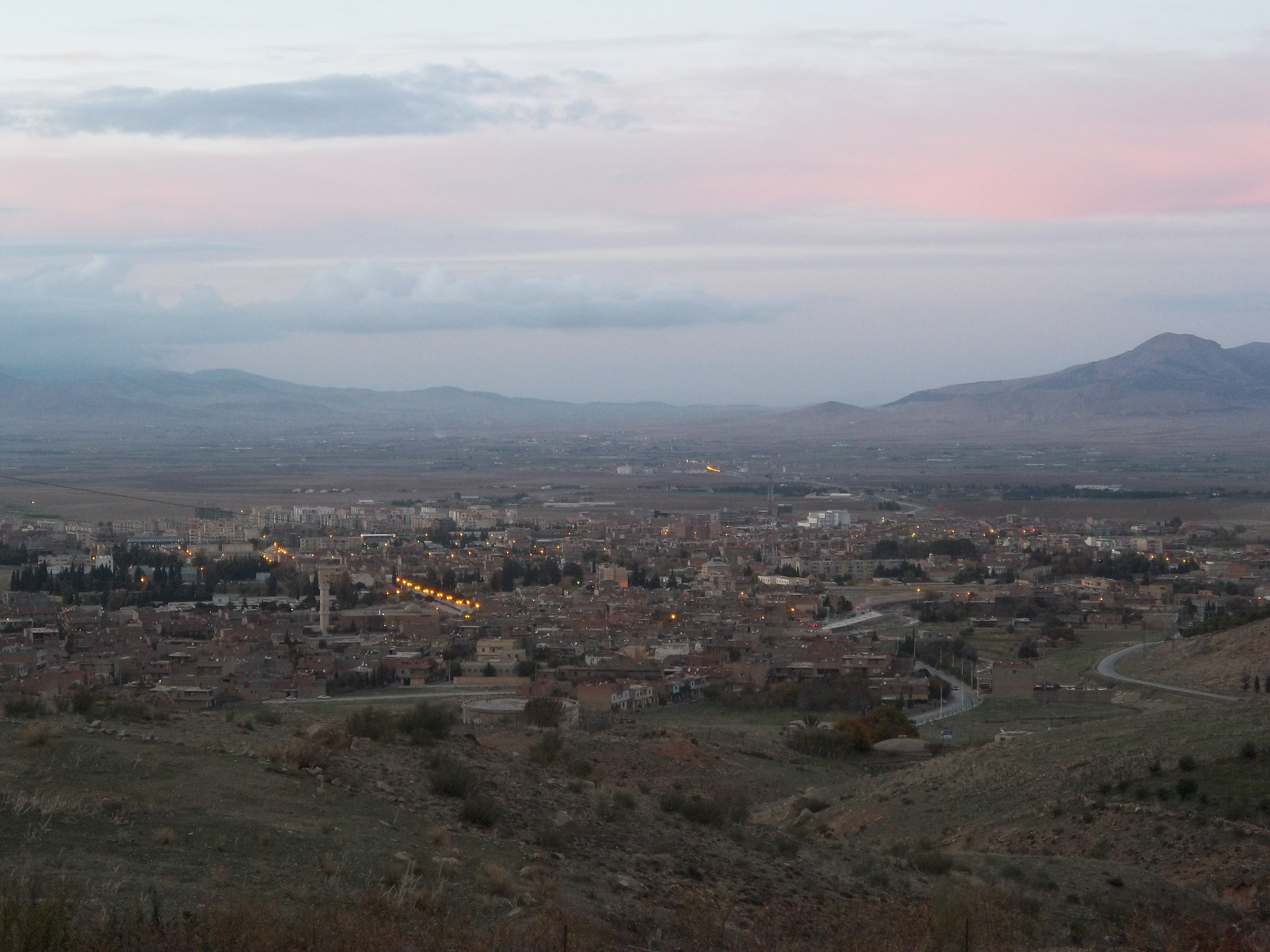
- Merouana

- Location of Merouana in the Batna Province

- Location in Algeria
- Coordinates: 35°38′N 5°55′E
- Country: Algeria
- Wilaya: Batna

Government
  - Governor: Oazani Amor

Area
  - Total: 509.97 km^{2} (196.90 sq mi)

Population (2008)
  - Total: 76,000
  - Density: 129.1/km^{2} (334/sq mi)

Merouana (Tamazight: Tamerwant) is a city in Batna Province, Algeria. It is situated around 40 km from Batna City, and is inhabited by the Chaoui Berbers. Merouana is one of the oldest local daïras (districts). It is the capital of the Belzma Plain and Belzma National Park.

== Origin and history ==
The city's founding dates back to the Roman Era, likely during either the end of the first century AD or the beginning of the second, and it was originally named Lamasba. It was a fortress which was damaged by Vandals. It was rebuilt by Byzantines and become a military area for Byzantine's military retirees.

However, this fortress was destroyed in the Islamic conquest in the era of Ottoman Empire, then it was re-established as a military base. It was entrusted with the task of collecting taxes in the French colonial era. It attained city status in 1909, and the daïra was founded in 1912 as the Corneille.

The region has seen many revolutions, the latest is Ali Musa revolution in 1916 in M'stawa mountains. It also saw first operations in the light of November approximately 30 attack in various parts of the region. The heroes and martyrs of the region include Ali N'meur, Ziza Massika and Salah Indochine.

== Location and terrain ==
Merouana is located at 35.6286 degree north latitude and 5.9117 degree east longitude. Geographically, merouana is located in the northern part of Batna Province, bounded to the north by Awlad Sallam and L'msil, to the north-east by Ain Jasser, to the West by RAs Layoun and N'Gaous, to the east by Seriana, to the south-east by Batna City, and to the south by Ain Touta. The daïra of Merouana consists of four municipalities: Hidoussa, Ksar Bellezma, Oued El Ma and Merouana. Merouana city is dominated by the mountains which surround it and which are snow-capped in winter. The most famous mountains are Sh'lalaa, M'stawa and Erefaa; others include Bughioul, Fakhra, Tikelt, Mothen and Tisras. However, this did not prevent the existence of broad Belzma plain, which is one of the largest plains in Algeria. Merouana region is a seismically active zone which has necessitated the establishment of an earthquake monitoring center which is the only one in Batna state.

== City Features ==
- Martyr Monument, to the memory of martyrs' souls in the midst of a large pine forest, rising to a height of more than 15 meters.
- The old mosque, is the oldest mosque built in Merouana.
- Museum of Revolution 1954, was founded recently to include the secrets of revolution in the region.
- The stadium with green grass land, which had been renovated in 2006.
- Telephone mast, which was established in order to install telephone and television antennas, rises more than 60 metres in the sky.
- Plant for manufacturing aluminum utensils and another factory to make biscuits.
- And there are large-scale projects under way, like the transport station and passengers as well as the mental hospital, in addition to the gym the proposed new road link between Merouana and Batna, which will include a 3 kilometer tunnel.
