= Boumagueur =

- Town
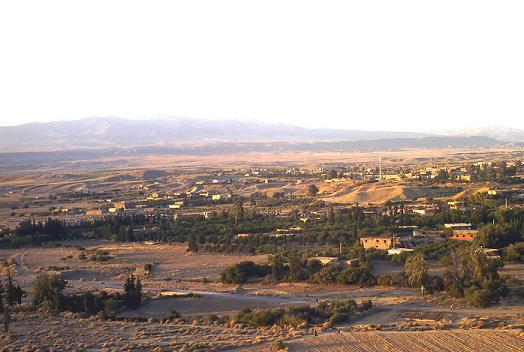

- Coordinates: 35°30′19″N 5°33′9″E
- Country: Algeria
- Province: Batna

Area
  - Total: 111.69 km^{2} (43.12 sq mi)
- Elevation: 756 m (2,480 ft)

Population
  - Total: 8,474
  - Density: 75.87/km^{2} (196.5/sq mi)
- Time zone: UTC+1 (WAT)

Boumagueur (Arabic: بومقر, Berber: ⴱⵓⵎⴰⴳⴻⵔ) is a town in northeast of Algeria. Area of the town is 111.69 km^{2}, 8474 people live there, density of population is 76/km^{2}.

The climate in Boumaguer is generally dry and hot during the summer, which can last from May to September. Autumn is mild and usually extends from October to November. Winters are cold and often rainy, with occasional snowfall, typically lasting from December to March. Spring is mild and sometimes rainy, occurring between March and May.

== Localities of the town ==
The town of Boumagueur consists of 11 localities.:

- Hassoune, capital of the town.
- Ouled Bouradi.
- Chantout (College).
- Al Feidh (Ouled Sahraoui).
- Sihcine.
- Al Khoualed.
- Megounssa (south).
- Lahnanchia.
- Al Keidh.
- Lahrakta.
- Al Bourat.
- bouraguba.
- el-ghar.

== Borders ==
- East: Ouled Aouf, Ouled Si Slimane.
- West: Djezzar, Barika.
- North: N'Gaous, Gosbat.
- South: Sefiane.

== Languages ==
All of the inhabitants can speak Shawia.
