= El Madher District =

El Madher District دائرة المعذر ⵜⴰⵃⴻⵎⵎⴰⵎⵜ Tahammamet
- District
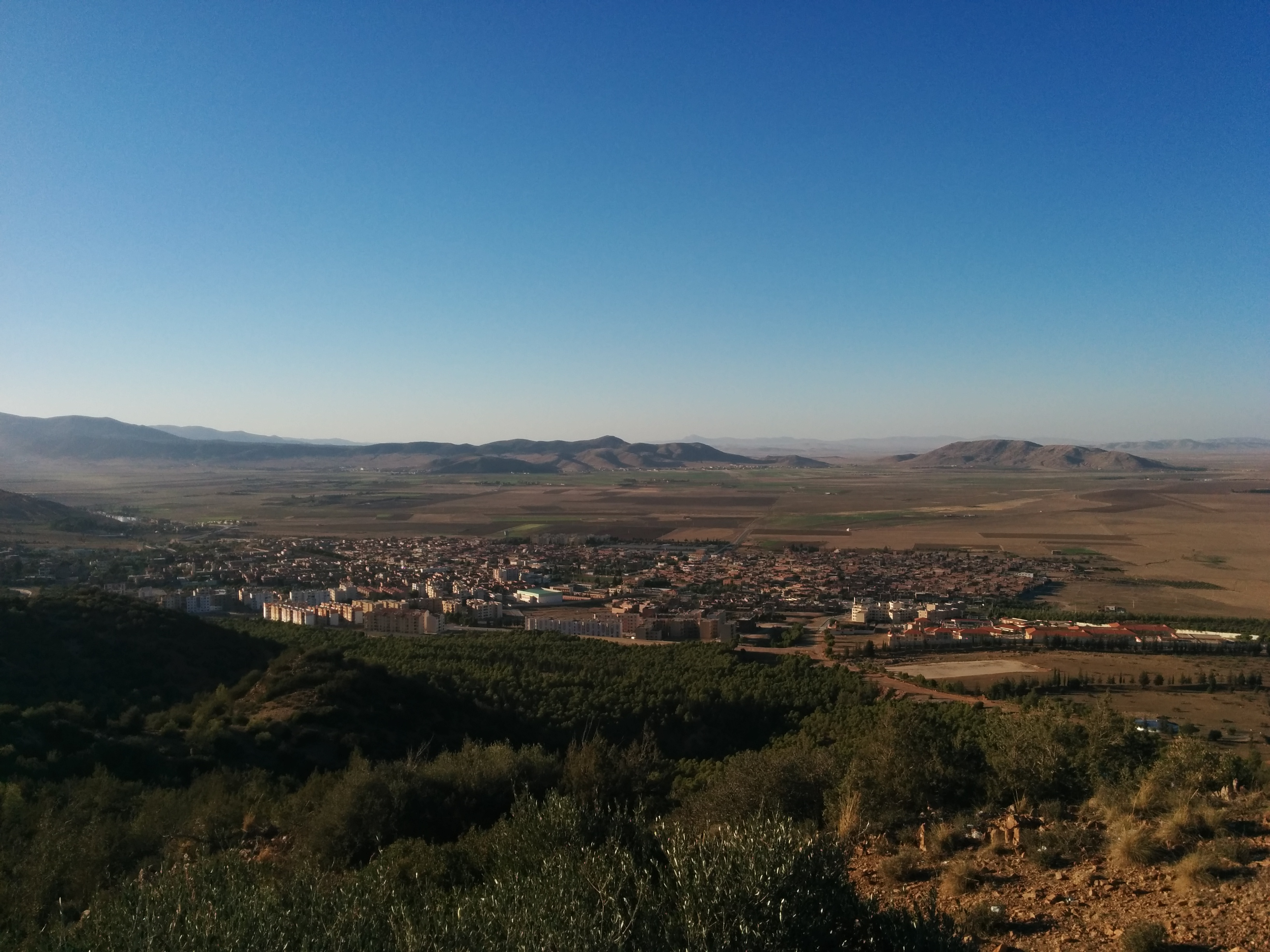
- Nickname: Tahammamet

- Location within Algeria
- Coordinates: 35.63121°N 6.369152°E
- Country: Algeria
- Province: Batna Province

Population (2005)
  - Total: 33,648
- Time zone: UTC+1 (CET)

El Madher District is a district of Batna Province, Algeria.

== Municipalities ==
The district is further divided into four municipalities.

- El Madher
- Aïn Yagout
- Djerma
- Seriana
