= Merouana District =

Merouana District مروانة ⵜⴰⵎⴻⵔⵡⴰⵏⵜ
- District

- Location within Algeria
- Coordinates: 35°38′N 5°55′E
- Country: Algeria
- Province: Batna Province
- Time zone: UTC+1 (CET)

Merouana District is a district of Batna Province, Algeria.

== Municipalities ==
The district further divides into four municipalities.

- Merouana
- Hidoussa
- Ksar Bellezma
- Oued El Ma
