= Seriana District =

Coordinates: 35°41′41″N 6°11′14″E

- District
- Country: Algeria
- Province: Batna Province
- Time zone: UTC+1 (CET)

Seriana District is a district of Batna Province, Algeria.

== Municipalities ==
The district further divides into three municipalities.

- Seriana
- Lazrou
- Zanat El Beida
