= Ichmoul District =

Coordinates: 35°18′N 6°29′E

- District
- Country: Algeria
- Province: Batna Province
- Time zone: UTC+1 (CET)

Ichmoul District is a district of Batna Province, Algeria.

== Municipalities ==
- Ichmoul
- Foum Toub
- Inoughissen
