= Tazoult District =

Coordinates: 35°29′24″N 6°15′36″E

- District
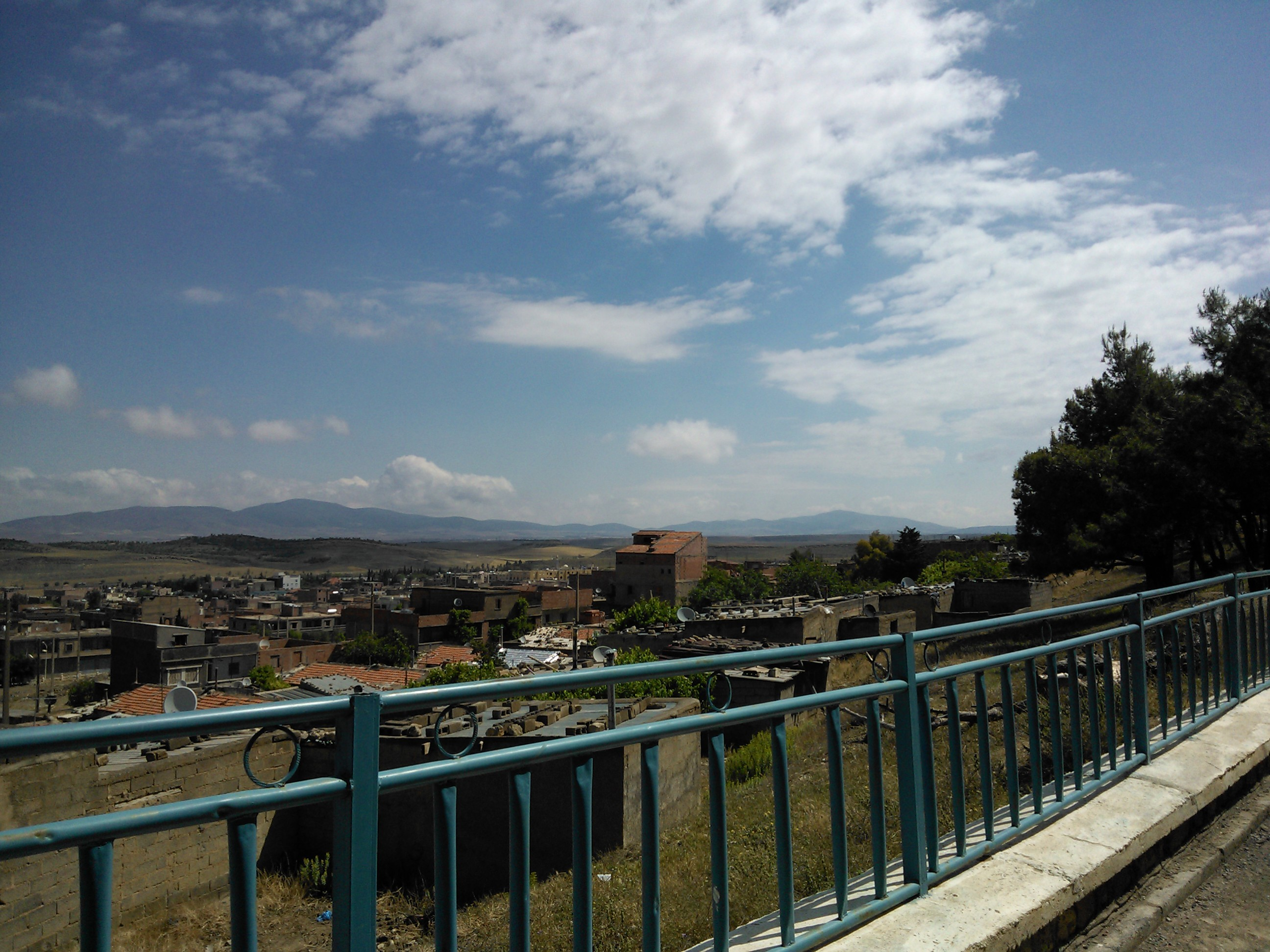
- village of Tazoult.

- Country: Algeria
- Province: Batna Province
- Time zone: UTC+1 (CET)

Tazoult District is a district of Batna Province, Algeria. The capital is Tazoult, a small city of 5,000 inhabitants.

== Geography ==
It is 1200 m above sea level, and surrounded by Jebel Doufana and Oustili Mountains to the west and Jebel Tafrent to the south. Average temperature (°C) ranges from 5° in Winter to 26° in Summer though temperatures as high as 40° have been recorded.

== Department ==
Since 1984, the commune of Tazoult consists of the following areas:

- Boukha
- Bouzène
- Chaabet El Ghoul
- Chenatif
- Draa Ben Sebbah
- Steward
- Latrèche
- Markouna
- Merfeg Sidi Belkeir
- Oued Bouhayoun
- Oustilli
- Tazoult
- Tifiracine
- Touafez

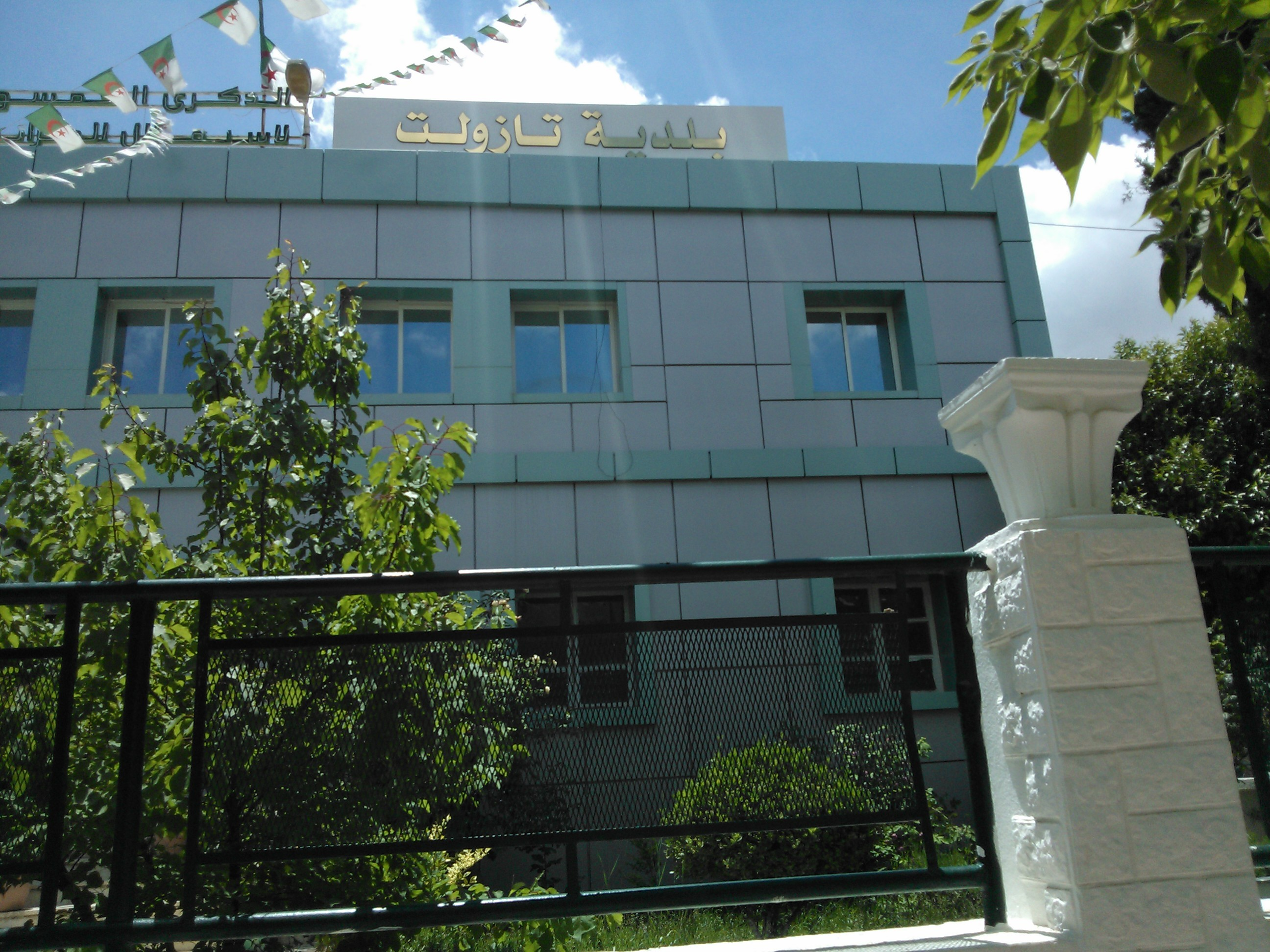
Tazoult town hall

The prison of Lambaesis was known for its harsh conditions and hosted Algerian nationalists the Algerian war of independence.

The current mayor is Cherif Guedouar who replaced long term mayor Moussa Fellah in 2012.

== Toponymy ==
The name of Tazoult is a Berber word for khol in Tuareg or antimony in other Algerian or Moroccan variants.

== Population ==
- 1880 = 4732
- 1966 = 64813
- 1977 =9314
- 1984 =11000
- 1998 = 22114
- 2008 = 27493

== Municipalities ==
- Tazoult
- Ouyoun El Assafir

== See also ==
- Lambaesis
- Algeria
