= Bouzina District =

Coordinates: 35°17′N 6°07′E

- District
- Country: Algeria
- Province: Batna Province
- Time zone: UTC+1 (CET)

Bouzina District is a district of Batna Province, Algeria.

== Municipalities ==
- Bouzina
- Larbaâ
