= Chemora District =

Coordinates: 35°40′N 6°39′E

- District
- Country: Algeria
- Province: Batna Province
- Time zone: UTC+1 (CET)

Chemora District is a district of Batna Province, Algeria.

== Municipalities ==
The district is further divided into two municipalities.

- Chemora
- Boulhilat
