= Menaâ District =

Coordinates: 35.182508°N 6.006775°E

- District
- Country: Algeria
- Province: Batna Province
- Time zone: UTC+1 (CET)

Menaâ District is a district of Batna Province, Algeria.

== Municipalities ==
The district further divides into two municipalities.

- Menaâ
- Tigherghar
