= Théniet El Abed District =

Théniet El Abed District ثية العابد ⵜⵉⵙⵉⵏⵜ ⵍⵄⴻⴱⴷ
- District
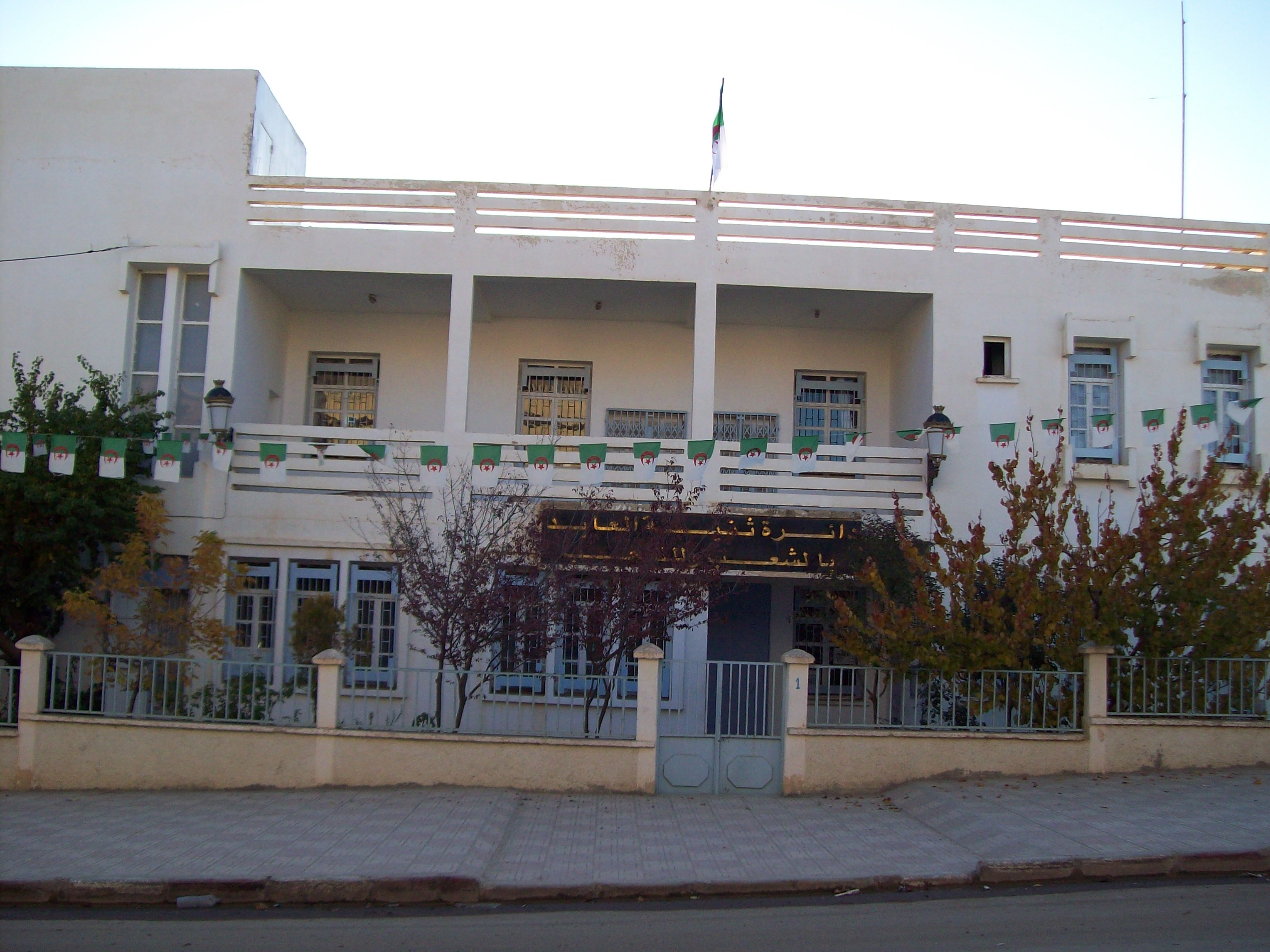

- Location within Algeria
- Coordinates: 34°14′49″N 6°11′26″E
- Country: Algeria
- Province: Batna Province
- Time zone: UTC+1 (CET)

Théniet El Abed District is a district of Batna Province, Algeria.

== Municipalities ==
The district further divides into three municipalities.

- Teniet El Abed
- Chir
- Oued Taga
