= T'Kout District =

T'Kout District Arabic: تكوت Berber languages: ⵜⴽⵓⴽⵜ
- District

- Location within Algeria
- Coordinates: 35.1392°N 6.30861°E
- Country: Algeria
- Province: Batna Province
- Time zone: UTC+1 (CET)

T'Kout District is a district of Batna Province, Algeria.

== Municipalities ==
The district further divides into three municipalities.

- T'Kout
- Ghassira
- Kimmel
