= Arris (disambiguation) =

An arris is an architectural structure.

Arris may also refer to:

- Arris, Batna, a town in Algeria
- Arris District, a district in Bosnia
- Arris International, a telecommunications company
