= Ouled Si Slimane District =

Coordinates: 35°28′N 5°28′E

- District
- Country: Algeria
- Province: Batna Province
- Time zone: UTC+1 (CET)

Ouled Si Slimane District is a district of Batna Province, Algeria.

== Municipalities ==
- Ouled Si Slimane
- Lemsane
- Taxlent
