= Batna District =

Coordinates: 35°33′25″N 6°11′00″E

Batna District دائرة باتنة
- District
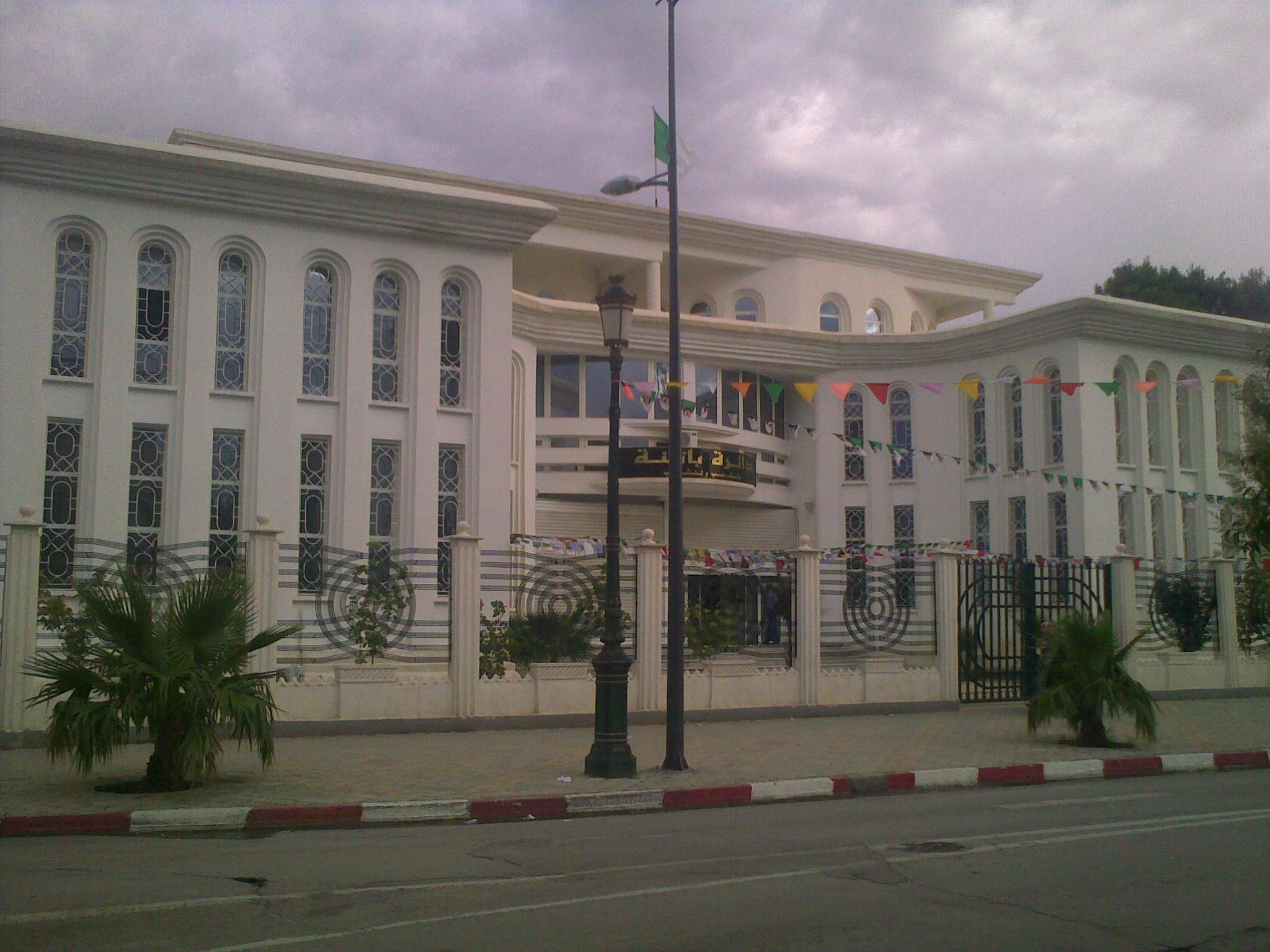

- Country: Algeria
- Province: Batna Province
- Time zone: UTC+1 (CET)

Batna District is a district of Batna Province, Algeria.

== Municipalities ==
The district is further divided into three municipalities.

- Batna
- Oued Chaaba
- Fesdis
