= Barika District =

Coordinates: 35.397166°N 5.365791°E

- District
- Country: Algeria
- Province: Batna Province
- Time zone: UTC+1 (CET)

Barika District is a district of Batna Province, Algeria.

== Municipalities ==
The district is further divided into three municipalities.

- Barika
- Bitam
- M'Doukal
