= Ug Zelmad =

Personal details
- Born: March 8, 1894; Tkoutt (Aurès Mountains)
- Died: 1921

Ug Zelmad, or Messaoud Zelmati, presumed birth in 1894 in Tkoutt (Aurès, Algeria) and died in 1921, was considered from 1917 to 1921 by the French authorities as a bandit of honor, and by the population of Aurès as a hero.

== Biography ==
Ug Zelmad was born in the town of Zellatou near T'Kout at Aurès in Algeria. His parents were Ahmed Ben Zelmat and Aïcha Bent Zeroual. Zelmad had several brothers. He was a shepherd, illiterate and poor.

His brother Ali, the eldest in the family, was sentenced by the Batna Court to one year in prison, escaped and became a rebel against French occupational authority. In 1916 he was found dead, prompting Zelmad to take his place and become band leader to avenge his brother. Possibly after being betrayed, he is believed to have deen arrested or killed. After his death, he became regarded as a hero who resisted the authorities.

== Posterity ==
Aissa Jermouni mentioned Ug Zelmad in a song. A film made for Algerian television traces his life story. A long epic poem in memory of Ug Zelamd was saved from oblivion by Georges Kerhuel. The painter Noureddine Zekara dedicated a portrait to Zelmad.

== Bibliography ==
- Jean Dejeux, Revue de l'Occident musulman et de la Méditerranée : Un bandit d'honneur dans l'Aurès, de 1917 à 1921, vol. 26, 1978 (), p. 34-54.
- Messaoud Nedjahi, UG Zelmad l'insoumis, Publibook, 2007 (ISBN 2748335880)
