= Boumia, Algeria =

Boumia: Arabic: بومية; Standard Moroccan Tamazight: ⴱⵓⵎⵢⴰ
- Commune
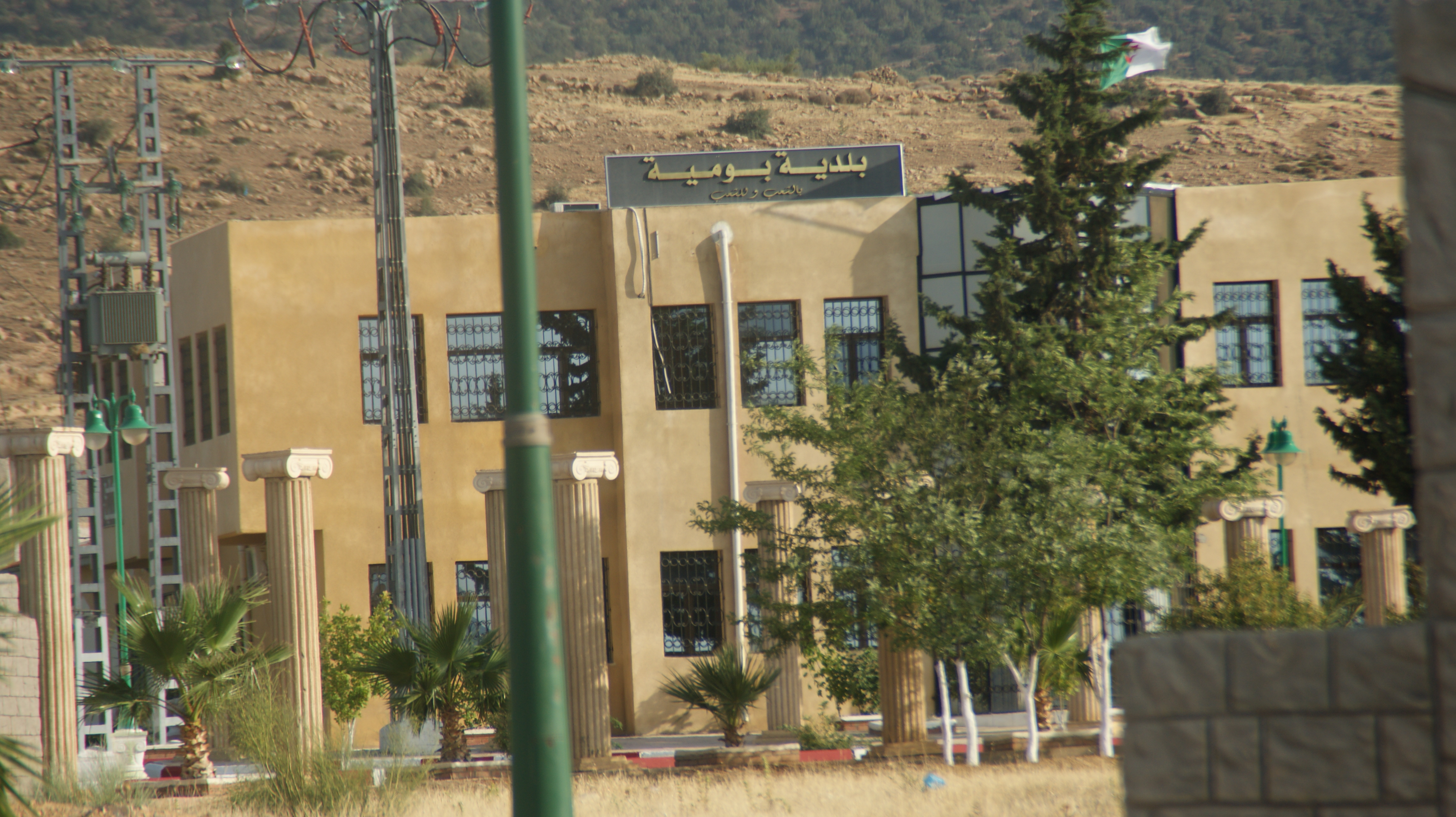

- Location within Algeria
- Coordinates: 35°40′38″N 6°28′55″E
- Country: Algeria
- Province: Batna
- Daïra: El Madher

Population (2008)
  - Total: 854
- Time zone: UTC+1 (West Africa Time)

Boumia (Arabic: بومية, Standard Moroccan Tamazight: ⴱⵓⵎⵢⴰ) is a commune in north-eastern Algeria. In 2008 there were 854 inhabitants. It became a commune in 1984.
