= N'Gaous District =

N'Gaous District Arabic: دائرة نقاوس
- District (Daïra)
- Location within the wilaya of Batna

- Location within Algeria
- Coordinates: 35°33′43″N 5°36′39″E
- Country: Algeria
- Wilaya: Batna Province
- Administrative Center: N'Gaous

Population (2008)
  - Total: 52,305
- Time zone: UTC+1 (CET)

N'Gaous District is a daïra in the Batna wilaya of Algeria, whose administrative center is the commune of the same name.

== Location ==
The daïra is located near the center of the wilaya.

== Municipalities ==
The district further divides into three municipalities.

- N'Gaous
- Boumagueur
- Sefiane
