= Ouled Sellam District =

Coordinates: 36°07′56″N 1°05′02″E

Ouled Salem District
- District
- Interactive map of Ouled Salem District
- Country: Algeria
- Province: Batna Province
- Time zone: UTC+1 (CET)

Ouled Selam District is a district of Batna Province, Algeria.
