= Timgad District =

Timgad District دائرة تيمقاد ⵜⵉⵎⴳⴰⴷ
- District
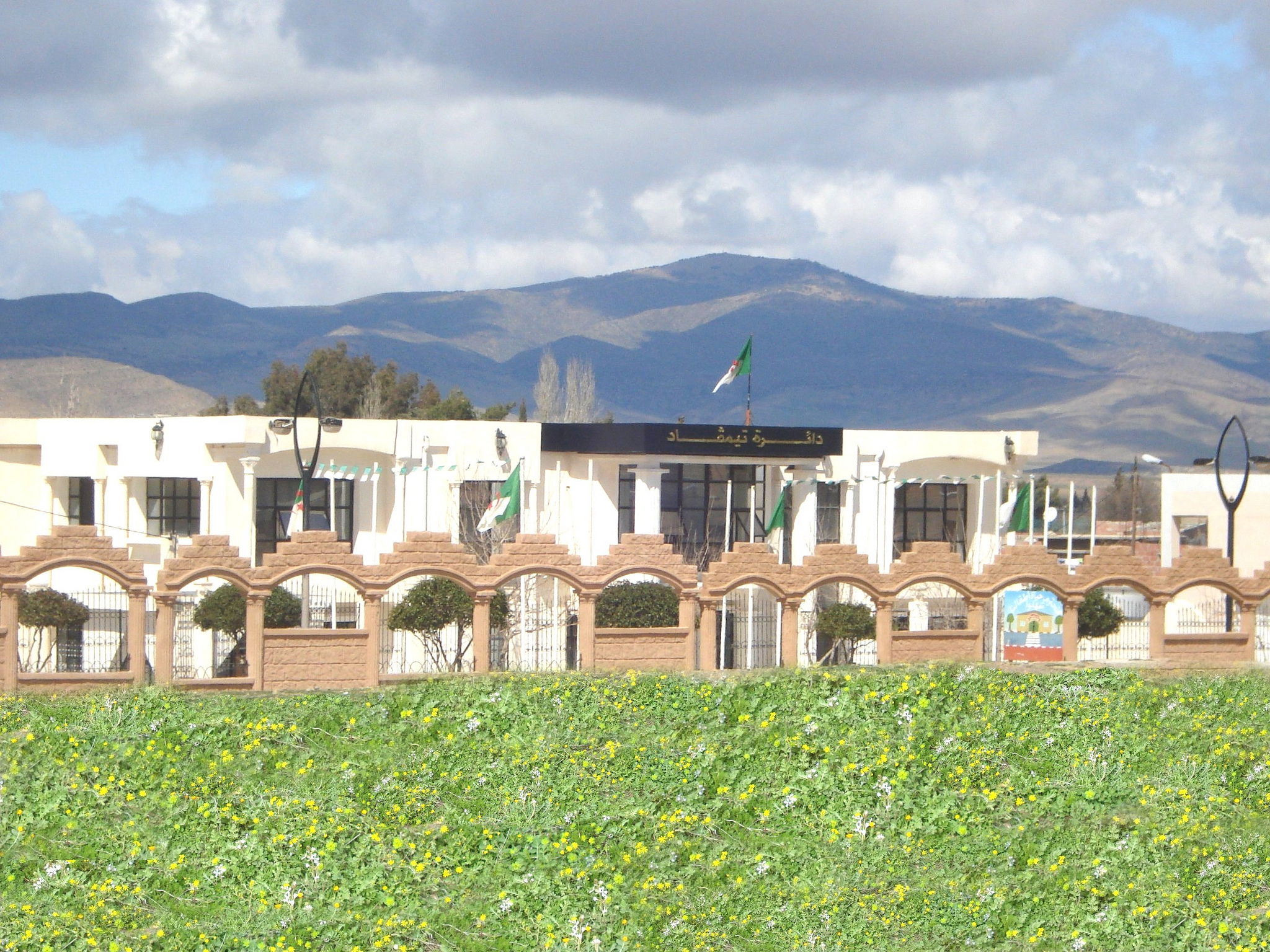

- Location within Algeria
- Coordinates: 35.49581°N 6.467235°E
- Country: Algeria
- Province: Batna Province
- Time zone: UTC+1 (CET)

Timgad District is a district of Batna Province, Algeria.

== Municipalities ==
The district further divides into two municipalities.

- Timgad
- Ouled Fadel
