= Sellam =

Sellam may refer to:

- Aïda Sellam, a Tunisian javelin thrower
- Ouled Sellam, a council "Commune" situated in northeastern Algeria
