= Saedani Al-Hashimy =

Writer, translator and journalist

- Born: 1948; Jarma
- Died: 2005 Batna
- Occupations: Writer, journalist
- Notable work: The Tree of Hope Sta Chur The Giant Constantine

Saedani Al-Hashimy (Arabic: سعيداني الهاشمي) was a writer, translator and journalist born in 1948 in the town of Djerma, 20 kilometres from the city of Batna in eastern Algeria. He died in 2005.

== Education ==
Al-Hashimy had his early education in regular schools and then moved on to a rich cultural path, where he learned about the basic roots of Arab literary and scientific literature.

== Career ==
Al-Hashimy's career path was distinguished by a diversity of jobs, as he worked in education, practiced translation and journalism. He was assigned to the media at the level of the state of Batna before he took over the administration of the House of Culture for 14 years, during which he mde it a destination for intellectuals and creators, including university students, playwrights, painters, writers and journalists. He then returned to his original position as a chief administrative assistant in one of the departments of the state headquarters of Batna.

Al-Hashimy was one of the most prominent campaigners for the continued broadcasting of Radio Batna after independence. He was a founding member of the Eurasia Folk Song Festival, as well as one of the founders of the Timgad International Festival, which has become a pride for Algeria.

His mastery of the Arabic and French languages earned him a unique style of writing and social analysis. He was an advocate of democratic, modern and republican values. He promoted the authentic Amazigh culture.

== Works ==
Al-Hashimy left behind a rich cultural heritage through his works that he embodied in various literary genres, from novel to story, through theater and biography. His books include:

Book	Langage	Publisher	Year	Number of pages	International number	Source
The oppressed (Arabic: almudahadun)	Arabic	National Book Foundation	1985	373		
Intruder (Arabic: almutasalila)	Arabic	National Book Foundation	1986	145		
Barrier	Arabic	National Book Foundation	1986	210		
The broken glasses (Arabic: alnadara almaksura)	Arabic	National Book Foundation	1986	123		
The Odyssey: Cultural works in Algeria: An Autobiography (Arabic: 'uwdisiat : aleamal althaqafiu fi aljazayar: sira dhatia)	Arabic	Al-Tabiyin, Al-Jahiziyah		456		
Intoxicating Scent: Stories (Arabic: aleitr almuskari)	Arabic	National Book Foundation		111		
The Defect (Arabic: al'anfilat)	Arabic		1986			
Sta Chur (Arabic: staa tshur)	Arabic		1985			
The Child's crook (Arabic: eawaj altifl)	Arabic		1993			
The Tree of Hope (Arabic: shujayrat al'amal)	Arabic		1984			
Steadfastness (Arabic: alsumud)	Arabic	Dar El-Houda		495		
The Giant Constantine (Arabic: eimlaq qusanutina)	Arabic		1984			
The Bumba Play (Arabic: masrahiat albumba)	Arabic					
The fugitive novel (Arabic: riwayat alharib)	Arabic					
Ash flavor (Arabic: nakhat alramad)	Arabic					
Honest and others (Arabic: sharifat wal'ukhrayat)	Arabic					
Girls secrets (Arabic: 'asrar albanat)	Arabic					
The crisis of dervish and thievery (Arabic: azimat aldurwshat wallususia)	Arabic					
Margins on the diaries of the last quarter of this century (Arabic: hawamish ealaa yawmiaat alrubue al'akhir min hadha alqarn)	Arabic					
Flying Dogs (Arabic: alkilab altaayira) (Fairy Tales)	Arabic					

== Awards ==
- Recipient of the late Boudiaf Award, for his book The child's crook (Arabic: eawaj altifl) in 1993
