= Mustapha Kouici =

Algerian footballer (born 1954)

Personal information
- Full name: Mustapha Kouici
- Date of birth: 16 April 1954 (age 72)
- Place of birth: M’doukel, Algeria
- Height: 1.67 m (5 ft 5 1/2 in)
- Position: Defender

Youth career
- CR Belcourt

Senior career*
Years	Team	Apps	(Gls)
....–1980	CM Belcourt	-	(-)
1980–1982	USK Alger	-	(-)
1982–1984	Olympique de Médéa	-	(-)

International career
1976–1984	Algeria	49	(3)
- * Club domestic league appearances and goals

Mustapha Kouici (born 16 April 1954) is an Algerian former international footballer. A left back, he represented Algeria in the 1982 FIFA World Cup, but did not play in the finals.

== Individual ==
- Africa Cup of Nations Team of the Tournament: 1980
