= Seggana District =

Coordinates: 35°21′N 5°38′E

- District
- Country: Algeria
- Province: Batna Province
- Time zone: UTC+1 (CET)

Seggana District is a district of Batna Province, Algeria.

== Municipalities ==
The district further divides into two municipalities.

- Seggana
- Tilatou
