= Draa Etine =

- Country: Algeria
- Province: Batna
- Time zone: UTC+1 (West Africa Time)

Draa Etine is a town in north-eastern Algeria.
