= Arris District =

Arris District دائرة أريس ⴰⵔⵔⵉⵙ
- District

- Location within Algeria
- Coordinates: 35°15′N 6°21′E
- Country: Algeria
- Province: Batna Province
- Time zone: UTC+1 (CET)

Arris District is a district of Batna Province, Algeria.

== Municipalities ==
- Arris
- Tighanimine
