= Djezar District =

Coordinates: 35°28′55″N 5°12′04″E

Djezzar District
- District
- Country: Algeria
- Province: Batna Province
- Time zone: UTC+1 (CET)

Djezzar District is a district of Batna Province, Algeria.

== Municipalities ==
- Djezar
- Abdelkader Azil
- Ouled Ammar
