= Hayat, Algeria =

Hayat
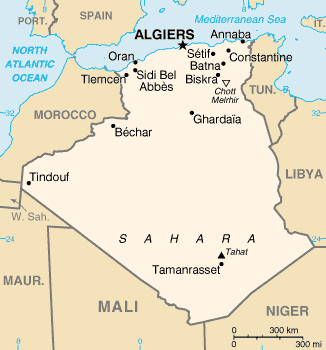
- Map of Algeria
- Country: Algeria
- Province: Batna
- Time zone: UTC+1 (West Africa Time)

Hayat is a commune located in the Batna, Algeria.
