= Inoughissen =

Coordinates: 35°17′07″N 6°32′31″E

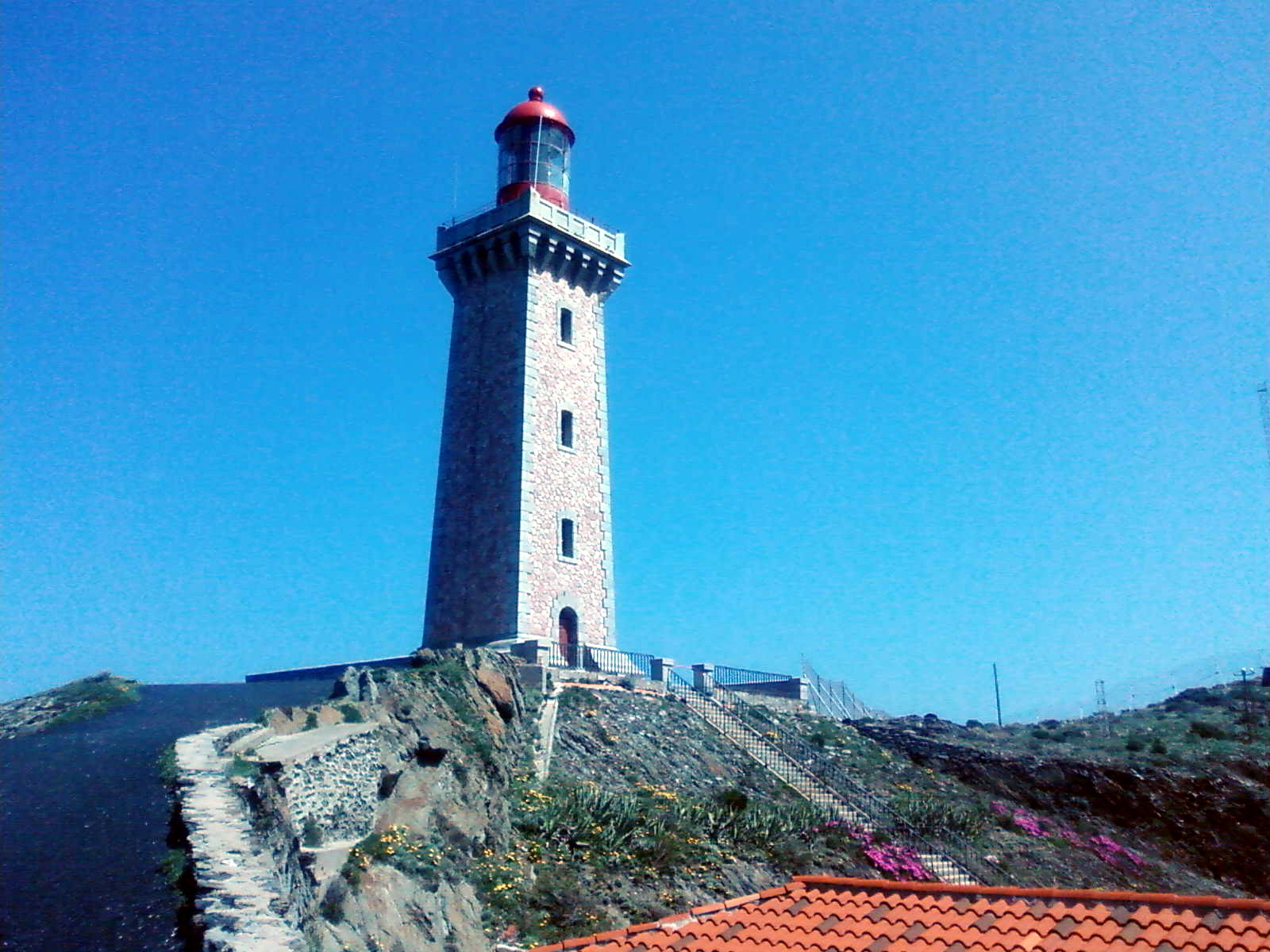

- Country: Algeria
- Province: Batna
- Time zone: UTC+1 (West Africa Time)

Inoughissen is a town in north-eastern Algeria.
