= El Madher =

El Madher المعذر ⵜⴰⵃⴻⵎⵎⴰⵎⵜ
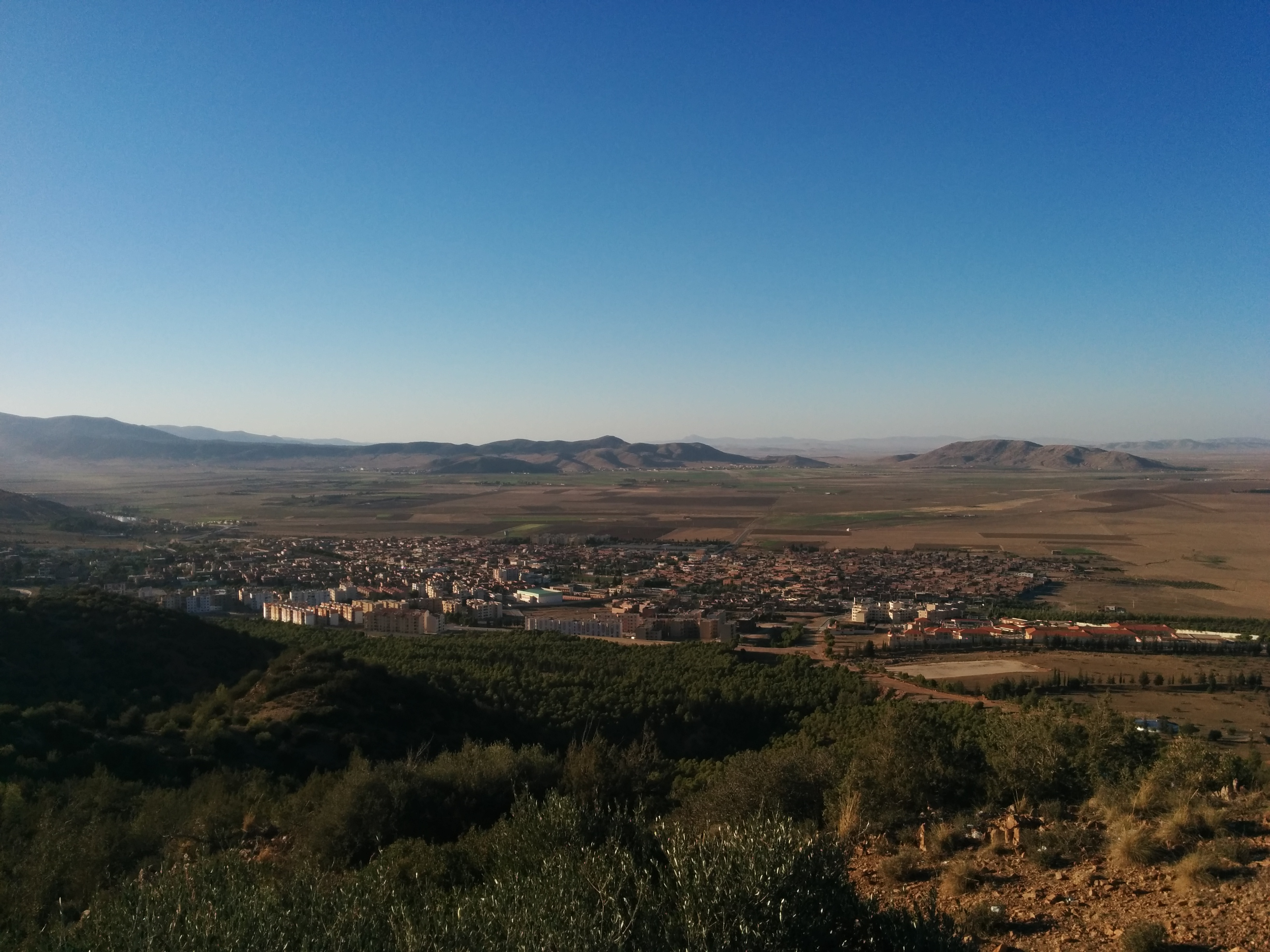

- Flag Seal

- Location within Algeria
- Coordinates: 35.63121°N 6.369152°E
- Country: Algeria
- Province: Batna
- Time zone: UTC+1 (West Africa Time)

El Madher is a town in northeastern Batna Province, Algeria.
