= Aïn Yagout =

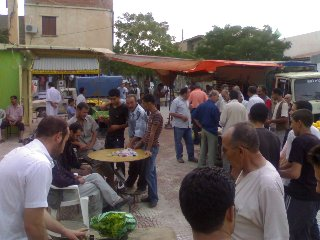
- Nicknames: The City of Fog, Yagout

- Location within Algeria
- Coordinates: 35°47′N 6°25′E
- Country: Algeria
- Province: Batna

Government
- Time zone: UTC+1 (West Africa Time)
- Website: ain-yagout.fr.gd

Aïn Yagout (Arabic: عين ياقوت · chaoui: ⵜⴰⴳⵓⵜ) is an Algerian community in Villa Batna, 35 km northeast of Batna and 75 km southwest of Constantine.

== Location ==
The territory of Aïn Yagout is located to the northeast of the wilaya of Batna.

== Towns of the municipality ==
The communities of Aïn Yagout are made up of 10 localities:

- Thagout
- Dahr Azem
- El Malha
- Tehawit
- Ayath Mloule
- Bir Ammar
- Draa Boultif
- Gabel
- Mechta Chorfa
- Theniet Saïda

== History ==
The city of Aïn Yagout was a village located around a fountain. Previously it was called Douar Sidi Ali.

In 1873, the French army decided to make it a place of cantonment. After a massive exodus of residents from neighboring villages to these places, the French erected a gendarmerie barracks near the fountain.

Aïn Yagout was granted commune status on January 12, 1957.

== Toponymie ==
The name of the town Ain Yagout is an arabized toponym formed by two components: عين Aïn meaning "source" and the suffix ياقوت Yakout (or Yagout) meaning "ruby" or "hyacinth" but the origin of the appellation is Tamazight Berber Thagouth ⵜⴰⴳⵓⵜ meaning "fog"

== Demography ==
=== Demographic evolution ===
the population of
1966	1977	1984	1998	2008
4 358	5 220	7 000	8 988	10 856

== Festivals ==
- Yennayer or Yennar (Amazigh New Year).
- Thafsouth (The beginning of spring)
