= Tigherghar =

Coordinates: 35°09′37″N 5°58′11″E

- Country: Algeria
- Province: Batna
- Time zone: UTC+1 (West Africa Time)

Tigherghar is a town in southwestern Algeria. It is part of the Batna province. The local people mostly speak Berber languages.
