= Lazrou =

Coordinates: 35°50′35″N 6°13′00″E

- Country: Algeria
- Province: Batna
- Time zone: UTC+1 (West Africa Time)

Lazrou is a town in north-eastern Algeria with a population of 5,143 people as of the 2008 census.
