= Lemsane =

Coordinates: 35°39′22″N 5°47′48″E

- Country: Algeria
- Province: Batna

Population (2008)
  - Total: 5,108
- Time zone: UTC+1 (West Africa Time)

Lemsane is a town in the Batna Province of north-eastern Algeria.
