= Larbaâ, Batna =

Larbaa

- Location within Algeria
- Coordinates: 35.18°N 6.04°E
- Country: Algeria
- Province: Batna
- Time zone: UTC+1 (West Africa Time)

Larbaa is a town in Batna Province, Algeria. It recorded a population of 982 in the 1998 census.
