= Guigba =

Coordinates: 35°44′03″N 5°35′27″E

- Country: Algeria
- Province: Batna
- Time zone: UTC+1 (West Africa Time)

Guigba is a town in north-eastern Algeria.
