= Oued Taga =

Oued Taga وادي الطاقة ⵉⵖⵣⴻⵔ ⵏ ⵜⴰⴳⴰ
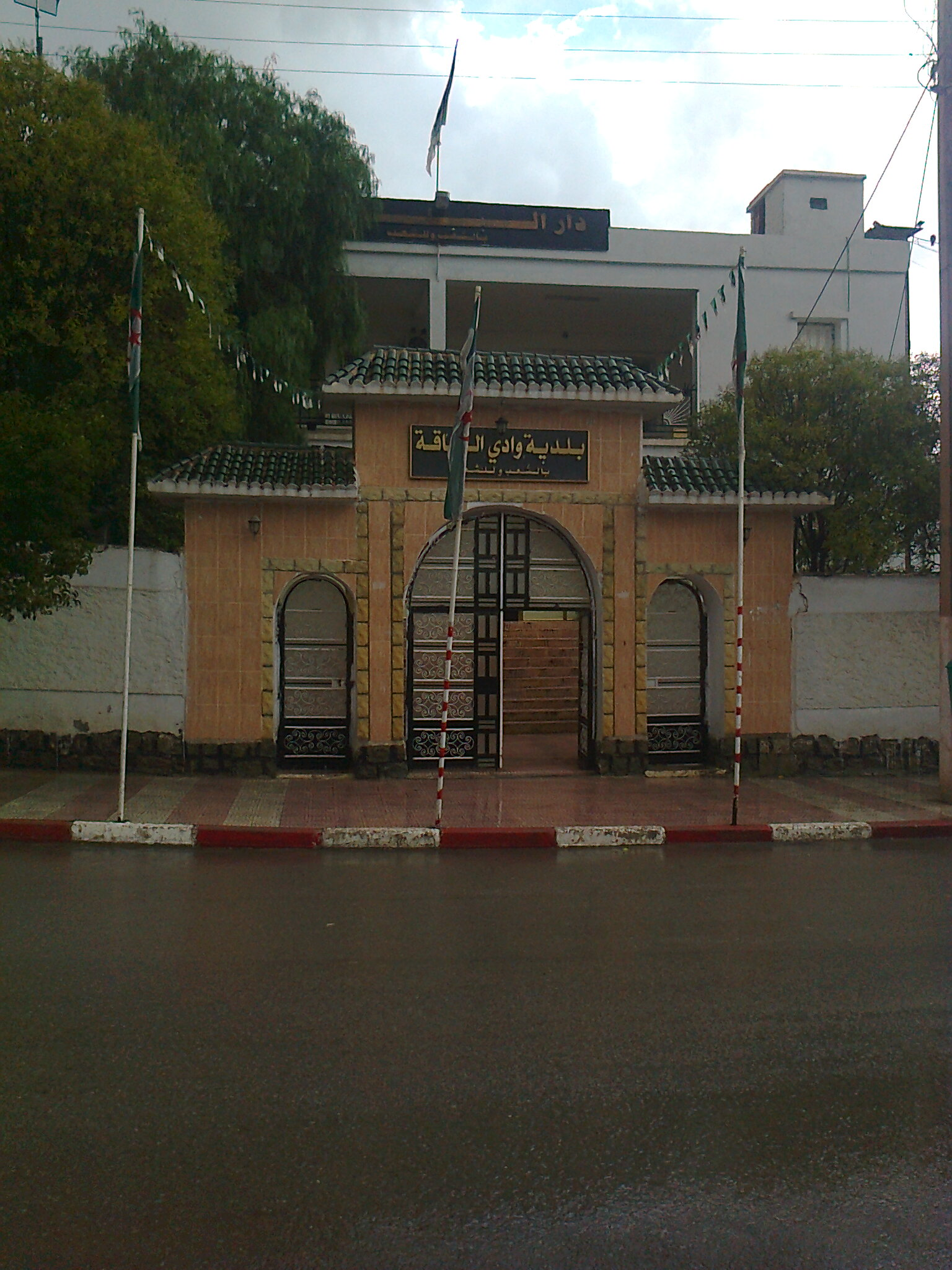
- Municipality headquarters of Oued Taga

- Location within Algeria
- Coordinates: 35.33°N 6.23°E
- Country: Algeria
- Province: Batna
- Time zone: UTC+1 (West Africa Time)

Oued Taga is a town in north-eastern part of Algeria.

== Berbaga Cascades ==
The Cascades de Berbaga are located in a mountainous area difficult to reach by car in the commune of Oued Taga in the wilaya of Batna a few kilometers from Timgad.

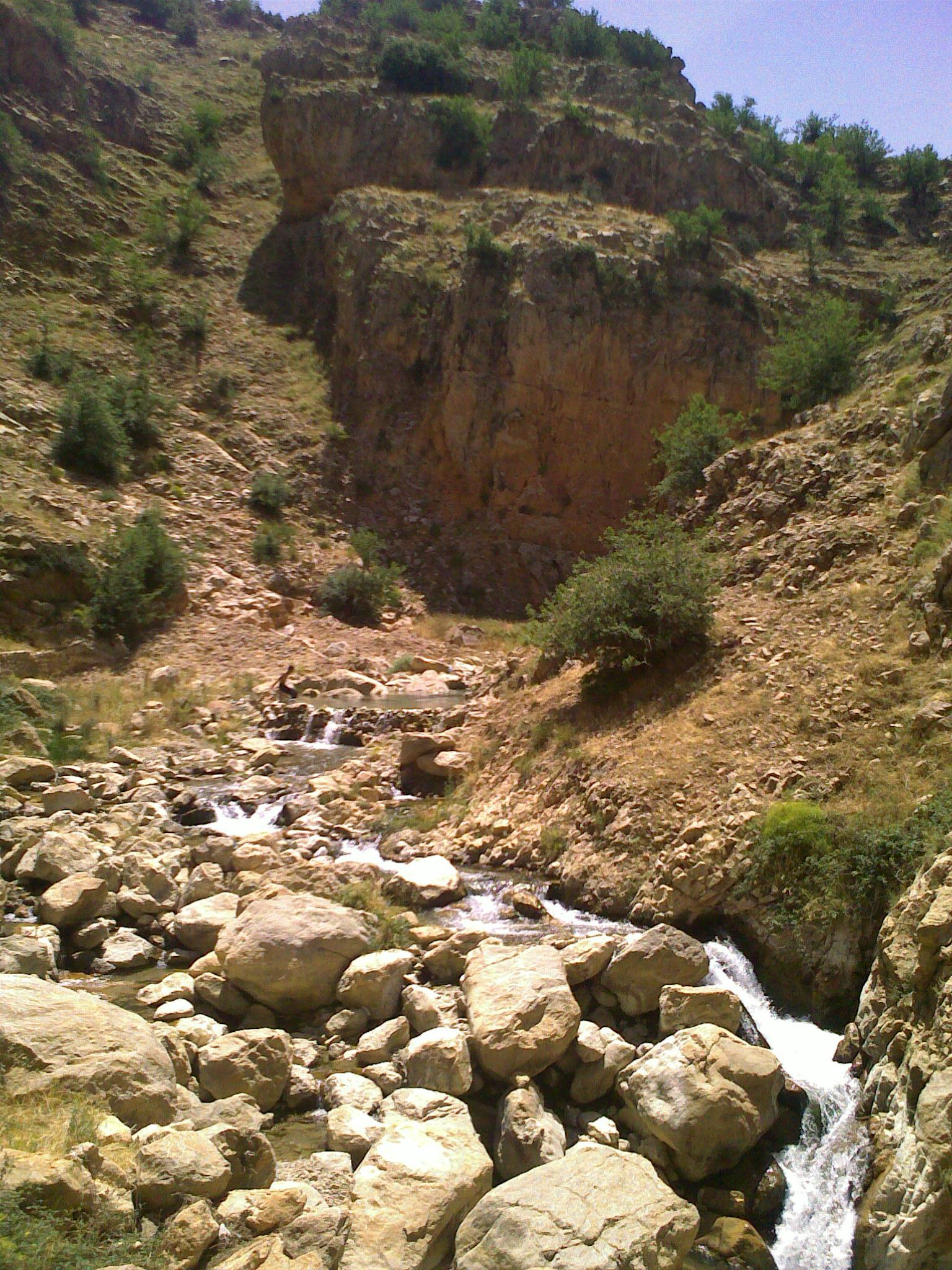

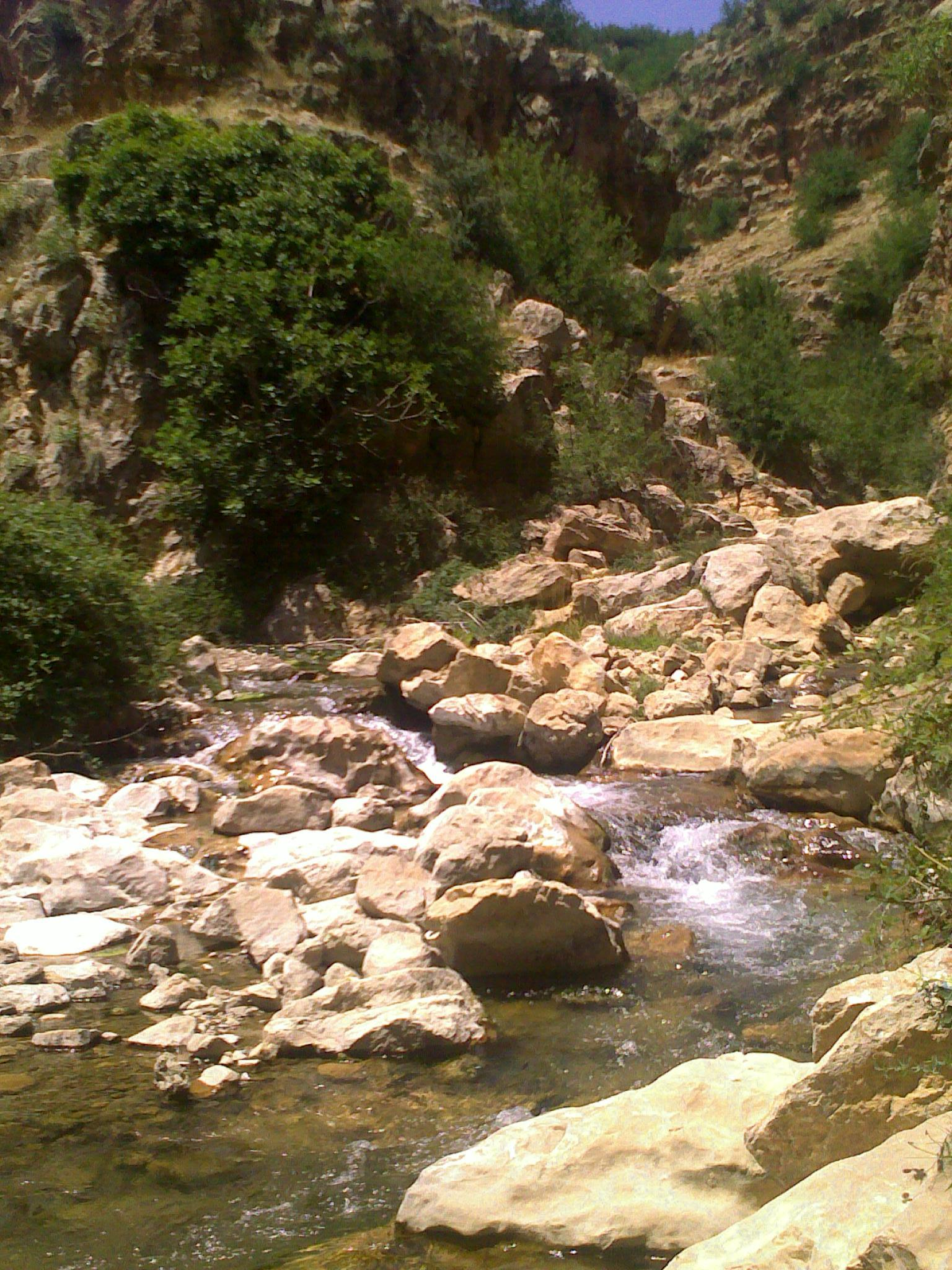
