= Chemora =

Coordinates: 35°40′N 6°39′E

- Country: Algeria
- Province: Batna
- Time zone: UTC+1 (West Africa Time)

Chemora is a town in northeastern Algeria.
