= Talkhamt =

Town in Algeria

Coordinates: 35°40′01″N 5°47′20″E

- Country: Algeria
- Province: Batna
- Time zone: UTC+1 (West Africa Time)

Talkhamt is a town in north-eastern Algeria.
