= Ouyoun El Assafir =

Coordinates: 35°31′16″N 6°22′47″E

- Seal
- Nickname: ﺮﻴﻓ ﺎﺼﻌﻟا نﻮﻴﻋ
- Country: Algeria
- Province: Batna
- Time zone: UTC+1 (West Africa Time)

Ouyoun El Assafir is a town in the Batna Province, in north-eastern Algeria.

The municipality of fr:Ouyoun El Assafir is located east of the province of Batna.

In 1891, during colonization, Sidi Mancar was incorporated into Laveran commune. In 1958, the city was incorporated into the department of Batna. After independence in 1963, Laveran was attached to the commune of Lambèse then linked to that of Timgad.

In 1984, Ouyoun El Assafir was made a town in itself, and consists of thirteen communities.
