= Ouled Aouf =

Coordinates: 35°27′20″N 5°45′25″E

Ouled Aouf أولاد عوف
- Country: Algeria
- Province: Batna
- District: Aïn Touta

Area
  - Total: 149 km^{2} (58 sq mi)

Population (2008)
  - Total: 1,724
  - Density: 11.6/km^{2} (30.0/sq mi)
- Time zone: UTC+1 (West Africa Time)

Ouled Aouf is a town in north-eastern Algeria.

== Localities of the commune ==
The commune of Aïn Touta is composed of 25 localities:

- Baasou
- Berriche
- Bitamat I
- Bitamat II
- Bouizourane
- Chihat
- Idahriene
- Ikichouine
- Kenzria I
- Kenzria II
- Lakraim
- Mehadjib
- Rhamna
- Rouagued
- Ouled Afercha
- Ouled Aouf
- Ouled Ben Amouna
- Seradha
- Stahi
- Tamezrit
- Tamssaghit N' Megaach
- Tahimayet
- Aith-Soumères
- Aith el Berkanes
- Chiheth
- Thaghith N'woudhayens
- Timesla
- Igra n'Amor
- Borenda
- Icharens
