= Ziza Massika =

Algerian nurse

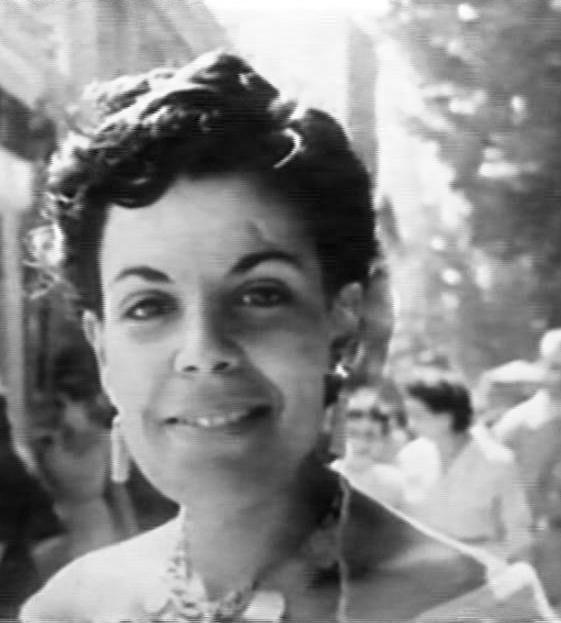

Ziza Massika (28 January 1934 – 29 August 1959) was an Algerian nurse who died during the Algerian War.

== Legacy ==
- Hopital Ziza Massika in Algeria 35.6325°N 5.9161°E
- Ziza Massika Primary School in Merouana
