= Boulhilat =

Coordinates: 35°43′28″N 6°39′45″E

- Country: Algeria
- Province: Batna
- Time zone: UTC+1 (West Africa Time)

Boulhilat is a town in north-eastern Algeria.
