= Ichmoul =

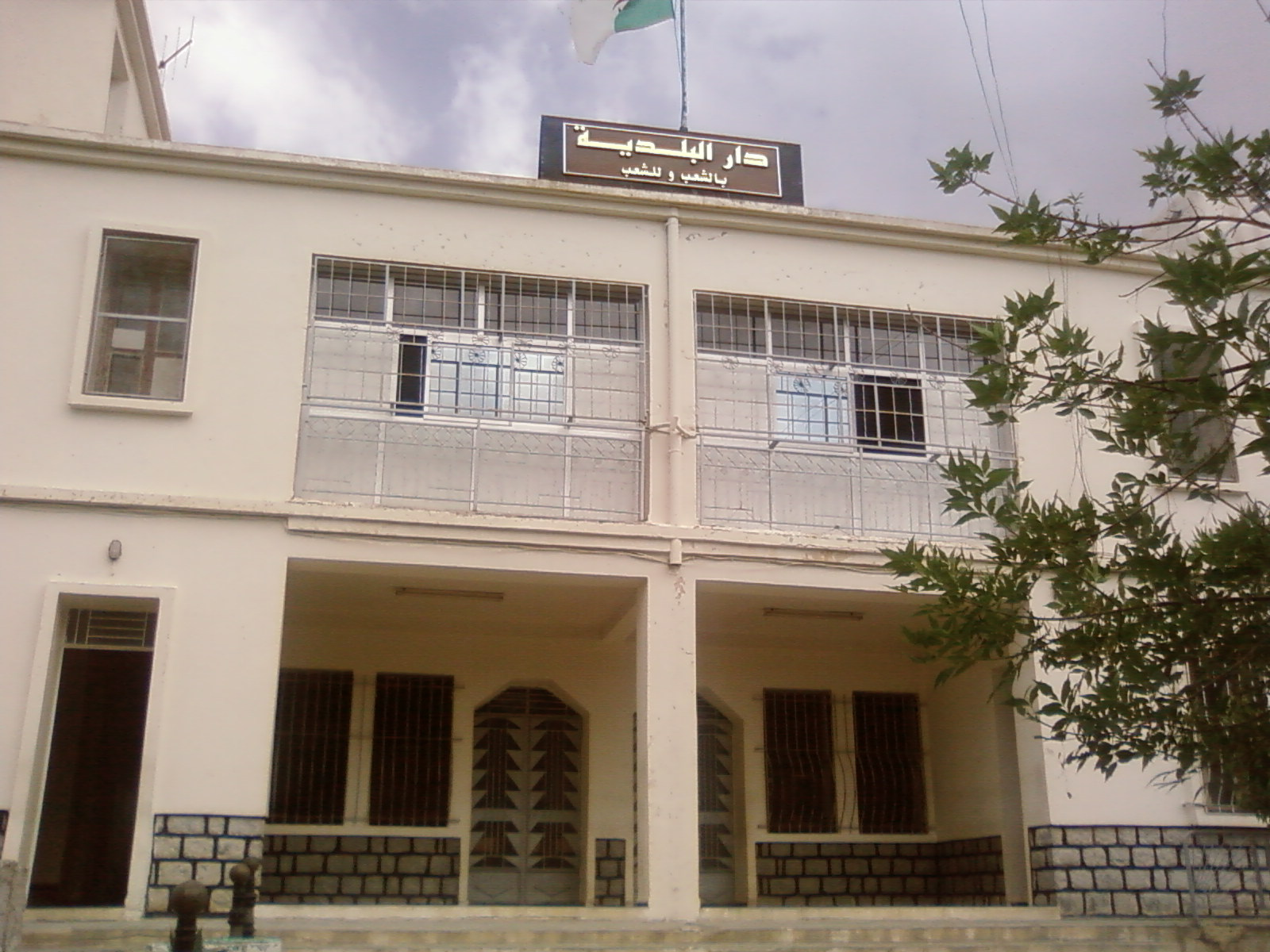

- Location in Batna Province
- Coordinates: 35°18′32″N 6°30′40″E
- Country: Algeria
- Province: Batna
- Time zone: UTC+1 (West Africa Time)

Ichmoul is a town in north-eastern Algeria.
