= Ouled Fadel =

Coordinates: 35°29′03″N 6°37′29″E

- Country: Algeria
- Province: Batna
- Time zone: UTC+1 (West Africa Time)

Ouled Fadel is a village in the Batna Province, Algeria.

The village is currently occupied by the Chaouia people which are the people who led the Algerian revolution and are the settlers of the Aurès Mountains, an eastern prolongation of the Atlas Mountains.
