= Taxlent =

Town in Algeria

Coordinates: 35°37′N 5°49′E

- Country: Algeria
- Province: Batna
- Time zone: UTC+1 (West Africa Time)

Taxlent is a town in north-eastern Algeria.
