= Rahbat =

Coordinates: 35°42′44″N 5°39′19″E

- Country: Algeria
- Province: Batna
- Time zone: UTC+1 (West Africa Time)

Rahbat is a town in the Batna Province of north-eastern Algeria.
