= Barika =

Barika بريكة ⴱⴰⵔⵉⴽⴰ
- City and Common
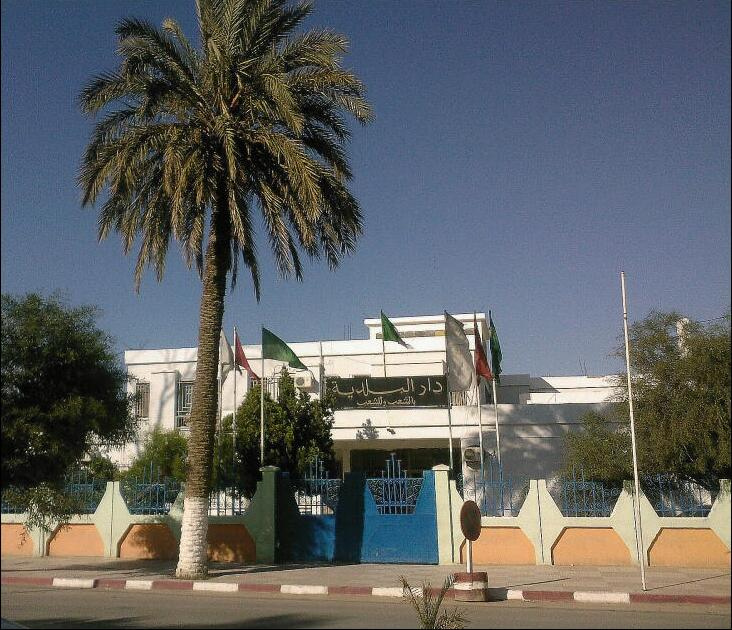
- Barika

- Location of Barika in the Batna Province

- Location of Barika in Algeria Barika (Africa)
- Coordinates: 35°23′50″N 5°21′57″E
- Country: Algeria
- Province: Barika Province
- District: Barika District
- APC: 2012-2017

Government
  - Type: Municipality

Area
  - Total: 117 sq mi (304 km^{2})

Population (2008)
  - Total: 104,388
  - Density: 889/sq mi (343/km^{2})
- Time zone: UTC+1 (CET)
- Postal code: 05001
- ISO 3166 code: CP

Barika (Arabic: بريكة) is a city in and the provincial capital of Barika Province, in Eastern Algeria.

The city has a population of 144,547 (2005 estimates). Barika is home to the football club of ABB Barika

== Demographics ==
Historical populations
| Year | Population |
|---|---|
| 1954 | 74,800 |
| 1987 | 56,500 |
| 1998 | 79,500 |
