= Fesdis =

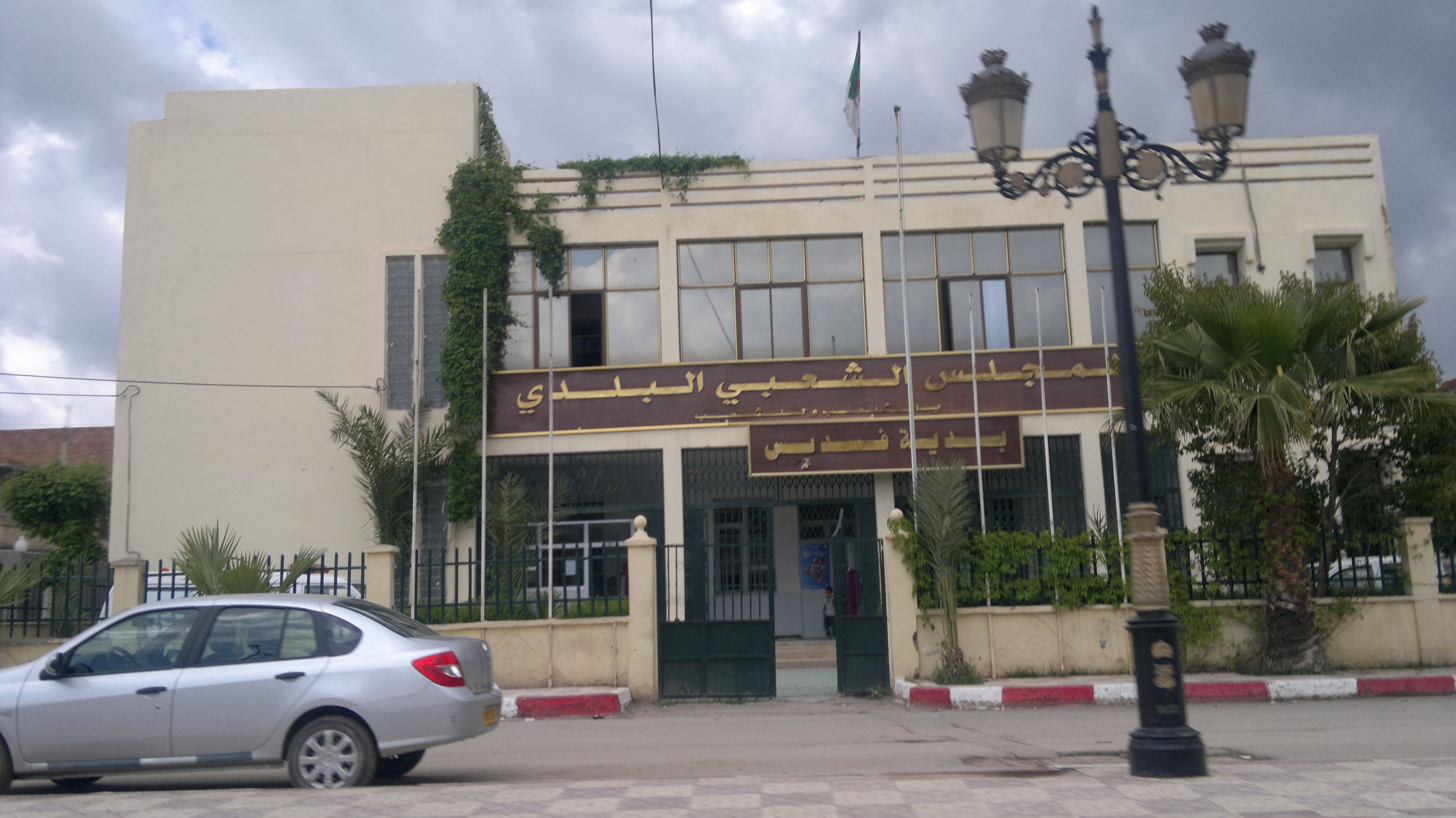
- Nickname: فسديس
- Location within Algeria
- Coordinates: 35°37′4″N 6°14′51″E
- Country: Algeria
- Province: Batna

Area
  - Total: 86 km^{2} (33 sq mi)

Population (2008)
  - Total: 7,517
  - Density: 87/km^{2} (230/sq mi)
- Time zone: UTC+1 (West Africa Time)

Fesdis is a town in north-eastern Algeria.
