= Oued Chaaba =

Coordinates: 35°30′17″N 6°04′40″E

- Country: Algeria
- Province: Batna
- Time zone: UTC+1 (West Africa Time)

Oued Chaaba is a town in north-eastern Algeria.

== Location ==
Oued Chaaba, also known as Lambiridi in Antiquity, and Victor-Duruy during the French colonial period, is a commune in the wilaya of Batna in Algeria, 10 km south-east of Batna .

== History ==
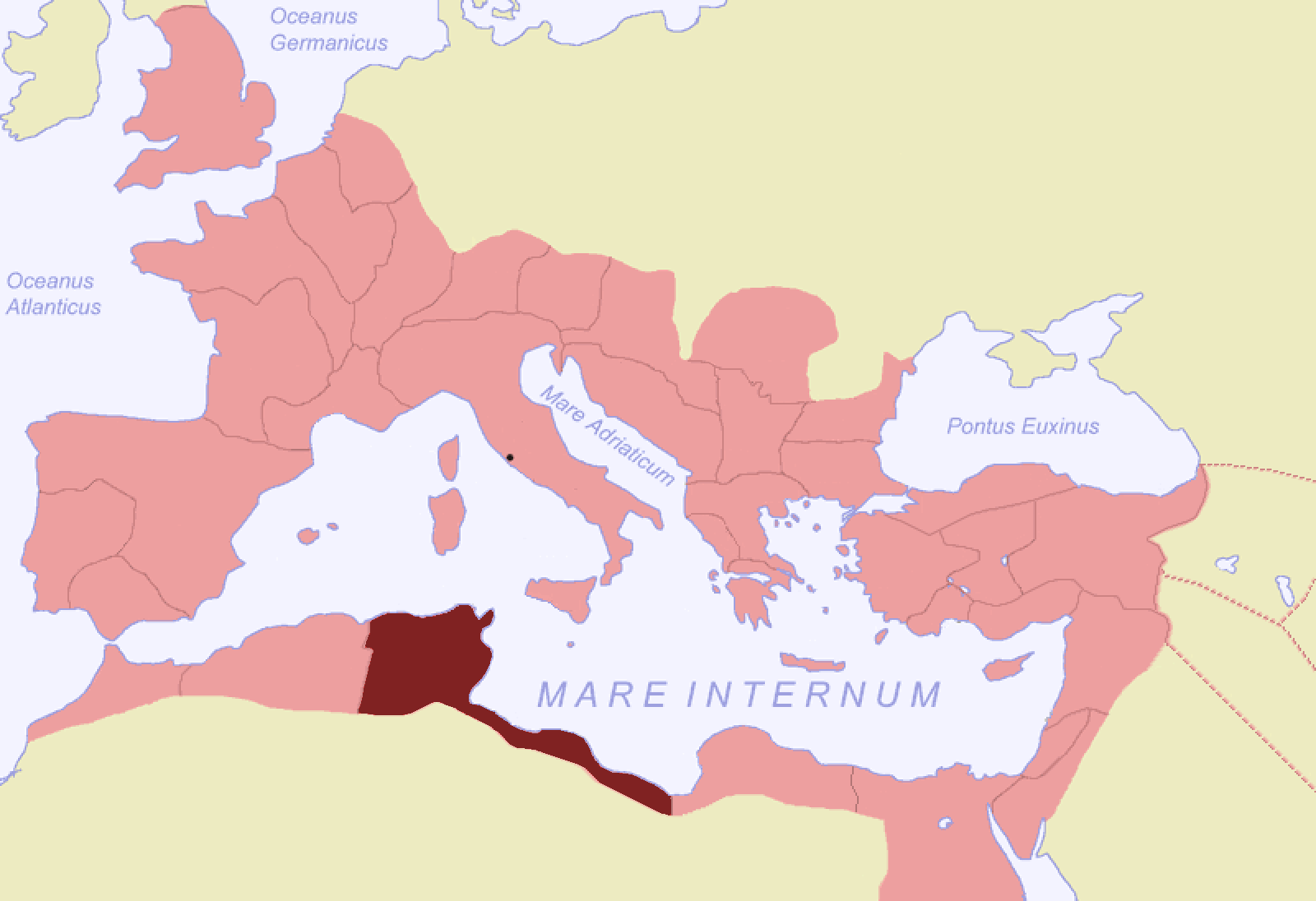
Africa proconsularis SPQR.

In antiquity the town was a civitas of the Roman Empire called Lambiridi. The town was also the seat of an ancient Bishopric, both of which lasted till the Muslim conquest of the Maghreb.

=== Colonial era History ===
By decree of 28 December 1915, the settlement center Oued Chaaba, which is in the mixed commune of Aïn-Touta, takes the name of Victor-Duruy.

The local population is predominantly Ouled Chlih. On 14 June 1955, fifteen people were burned alive in the Benabid farm in retaliation for the execution by militants led by Mohamed Tahar Abidi said El Hadj Lakhdar, a settler named Jacques Vianes.

In Boukaabane, the first Algerian penitentiary in an open environment was established as part of the reform of the justice system. The institution is designed to receive prisoners at the end of sentences, having proved their good behavior, and who are close to performing productive activities.

=== Modern History ===
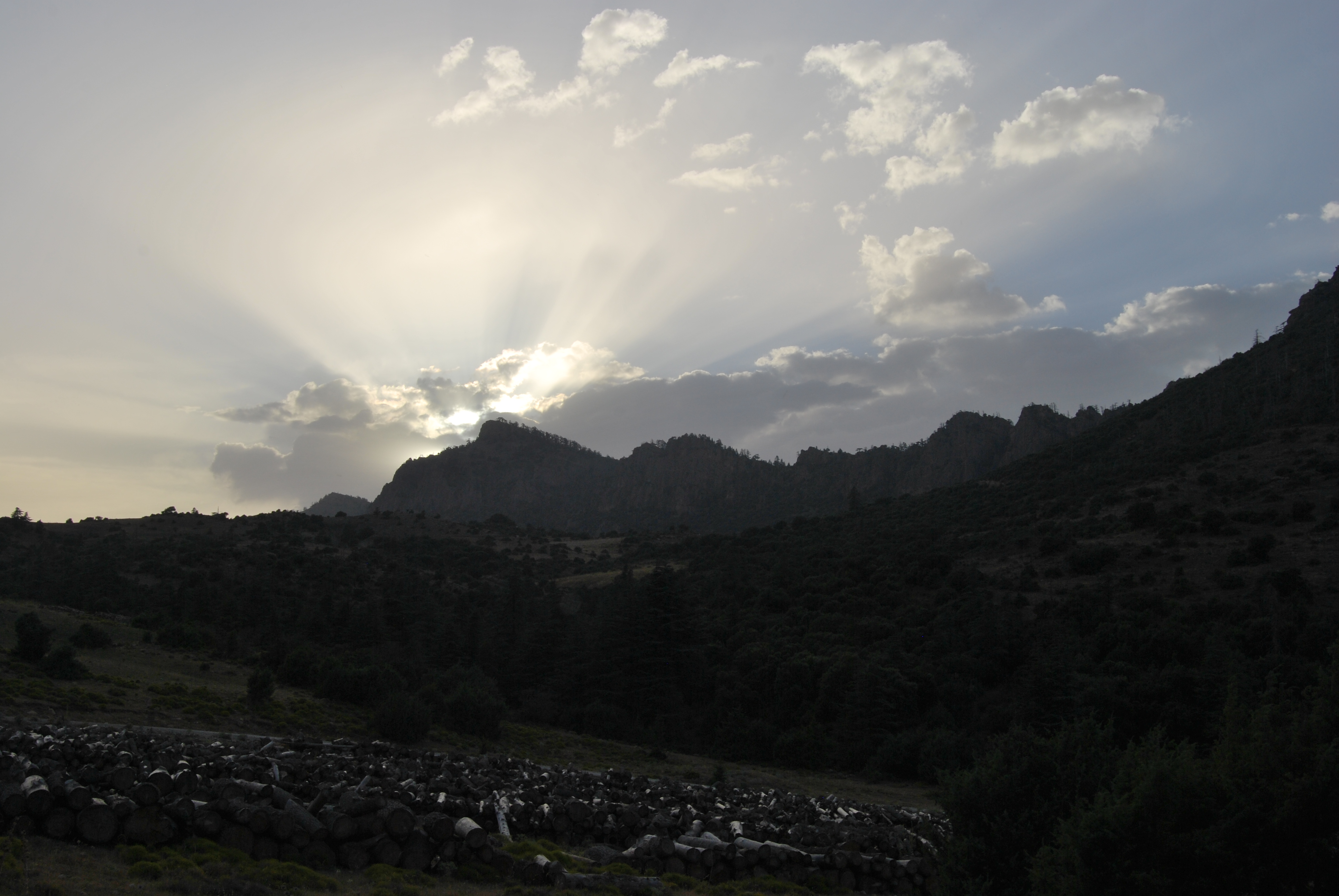
Forest of Oued Chaaba

On the evening of 27 August 2008, two soldiers and five communal guards were killed in an ambush by a terrorist group on the road to Merouana in the forest Adahri led by the Emir Leslous. On December 23, 2009, the twelve guilty of terrorist acts were sentenced to death by the Criminal Court in the Batna court

In Boukaabane, the first Algerian penitentiary in an open environment was established as part of the reform of the justice system. The institution is designed to receive prisoners at the end of sentences, having proved their good behavior, and who are close to performing productive activities
