= Tazoult =

Tazoult تازولت ⵜⴰⵥⵓⵍⵜ
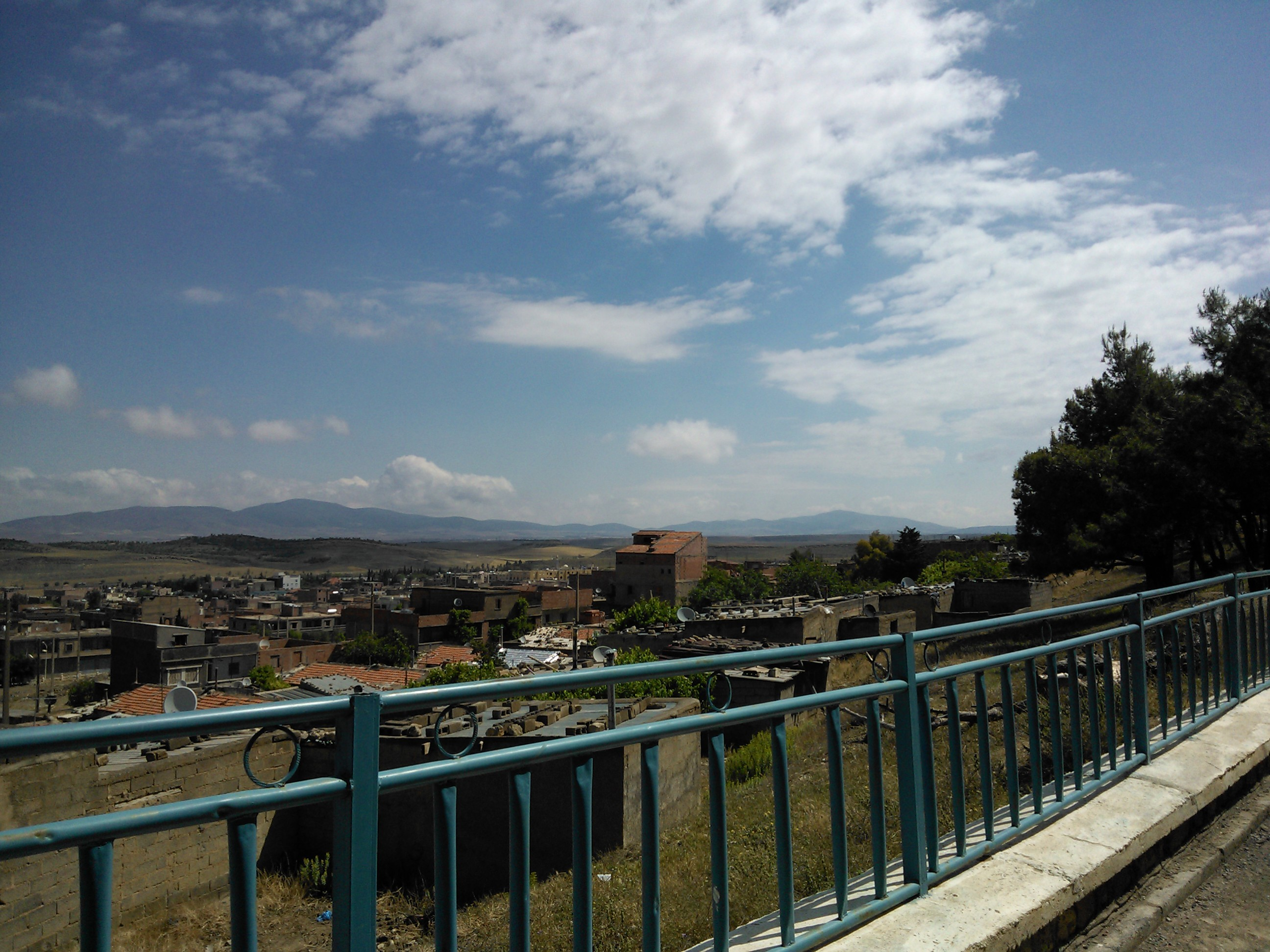
- Tazoult town
- Nicknames: Tazoult ( Lambessa ) Previously

- Location within Algeria
- Coordinates: 35.489188°N 6.254311°E
- Country: Algeria
- Province: Batna

Population
  - Total: 27 493
- Time zone: UTC+1 (West Africa Time)
- Website: http://www.apc-tazoult-lambese.org

Tazoult is commune town in north-eastern Algeria.

== Location ==
Tazoulte formerly known as Lambèse is in the wilaya of Batna 11 kilometres (6.8 mi) east of Batna, 25 kilometres (16 mi) west of Timgad and 90 kilometres (56 mi) at west of Khenchela, and centrally located in the wilaya of Batna. It is 1,200 metres (3,900 ft) above sea level, and surrounded by Jebel Doufana and Oustili Mountains to the west and Jebel Tafrent to the south . Average temperature ranges from 5 °C (41 °F) in Winter to 26 °C (79 °F) in Summer though temperatures as high as 40 °C (104 °F) have been recorded.

Since 1984 the commune of Tazoult consists of the following areas :

- Boukha
- Bouzène
- Chaabet El Ghoul
- Chenatif
- Draa Ben Sebbah
- Steward
- Latrèche
- Markouna
- Merfeg Sidi Belkeir
- Oued Bouhayoun
- Oustilli
- Tazoult
- Tifiracine
- Touafez

== History ==
The Roman civitas of Lambèse was a city garrison, founded in the year 81 by the Third Roman Legion, under Titus. Marcus Aurelius built the city and under Septimius Severus (a North African) an imperial residence of the legate of Numidia. Lambaesis, was for a time capital of Numidia, with a population of more than 1862 civilians. The city grew but when the legion was dissolved in 238, the city was deprived of its major economic support.

In the 5th century, the city was destroyed by the Berbers and disappeared almost completely under the Byzantines.

In modern times Italy sent their political prisoners to the town and, the French established a penal colony there in January 1850. It was guarded by a detachment of the 3rd Zouave regiments . The ruins which covered more than 800 hectares (2,000 acres) were used to build the prison, and town. A village populated by laborers, artisans and merchants formed around the prison. In 1862, an agricultural colony of 4,619 hectares (11,410 acres) was created for a hundred settlers. The settlement will create a full-function joint in 1869. Public buildings included a church, hospital and post office.

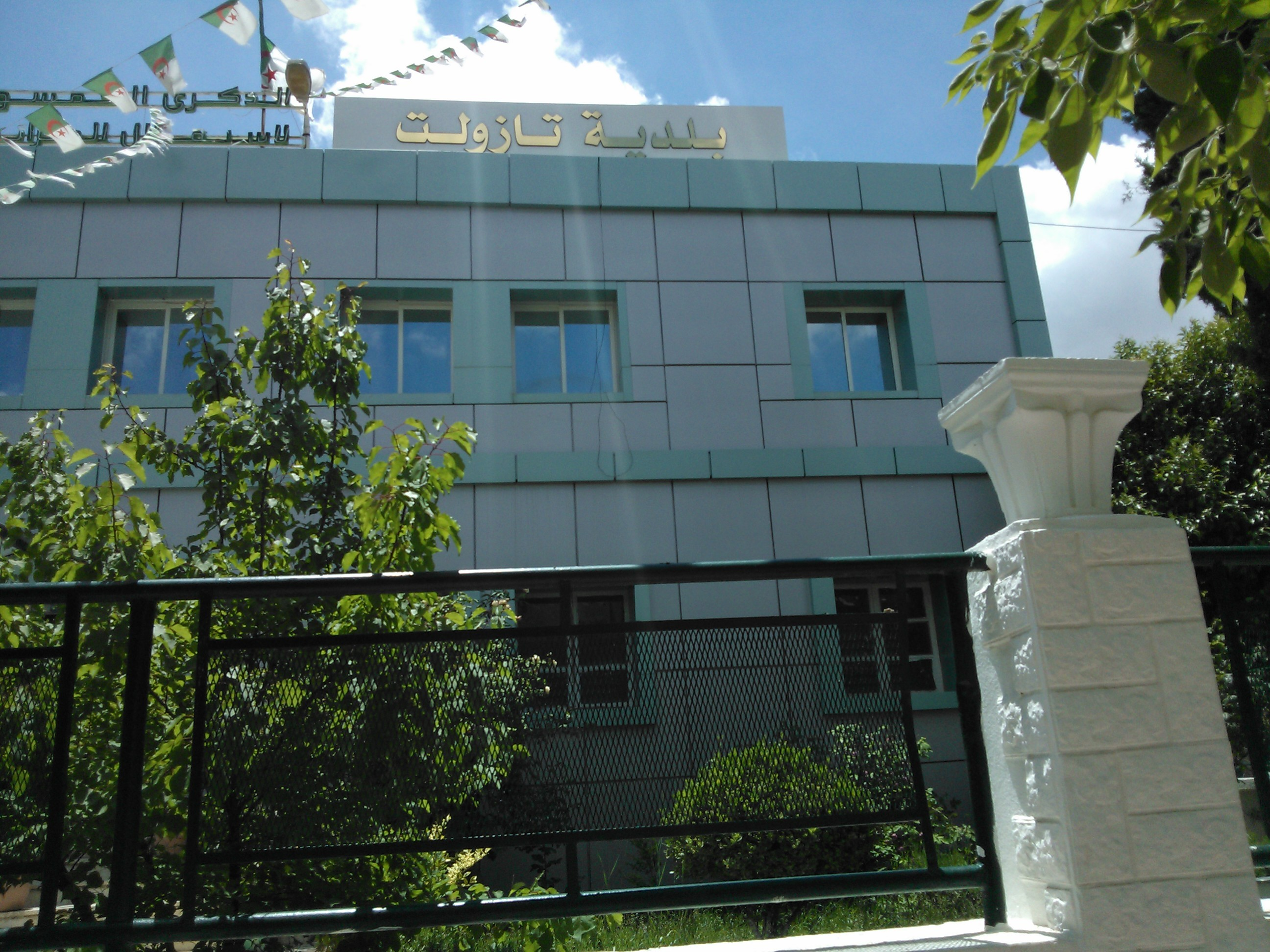
Tazoult town hall

The prison of Lambaesis was known for its harsh conditions and hosted Algerian nationalists during the Algerian war of independence.

After independence, Lambèse was renamed and became known as Tazoult. The prison is still used and has attracted criticism for conditions contrary to human rights and is used to hold political opposition members.

The current mayor is Cherif Guedouar who replaced long term mayor Moussa Fellah in 2012.

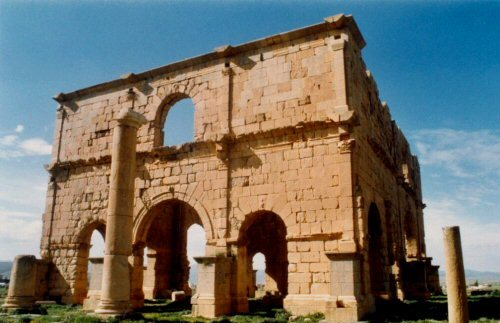
Garison building of Lambèse

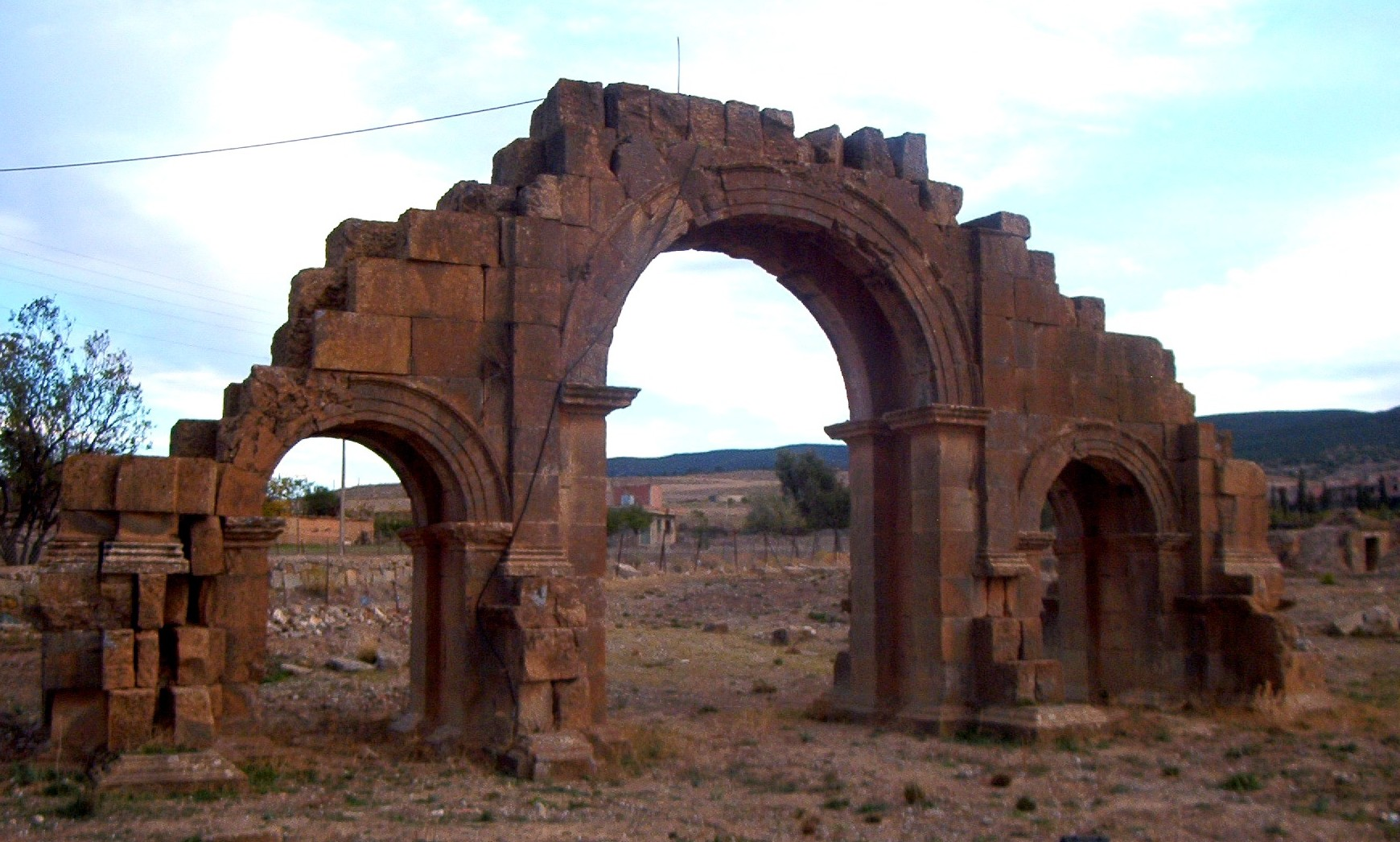
Roman Era Triumphal arch

== Archaeology ==
Archaeological Heritage includes:

- Garrison Lambèse
- the Praetorian
- The triumphal arch of Lambèse
- The Roman Areana
- the Capitol
- The temple of Aesculapius Lambèse,
- The Roman amphitheater
- Museum of Lambèse

== Toponymy ==
The name of Tazoult is a Berber word for khol in Tuareg or antimony in other Algerian or Moroccan languages.

== Population ==
- 1880 = 4,732
- 1966 = 64,813
- 1977 = 9,314
- 1984 = 11,000
- 1998 = 22,114
- 2008 = 27,493

== Infrastructure ==
The town has two schools: the school Emir Abdelkader and Mohamed Slimane Technicum, three middle schools (CEM), thirteen primary schools and a vocational training center. There are health facilities as well. The town has a museum and a library of culture and town hall. The town also boasts a stadium, three playgrounds, a sports hall and a swimming pool.
