= Zanat El Beida =

Coordinates: 35°46′44″N 6°05′06″E

- Country: Algeria
- Province: Batna
- Time zone: UTC+1 (West Africa Time)

Zana El Beida is a town in north-eastern Algeria.
