= Ksar Bellezma =

Coordinates: 35°40′32″N 5°54′12″E

- Country: Algeria
- Province: Batna

Population
  - Total: 9,033
- Time zone: UTC+1 (West Africa Time)

Ksar Bellezma is a town in north-eastern Algeria.
