= Menaâ =

Menaa kamal منعة
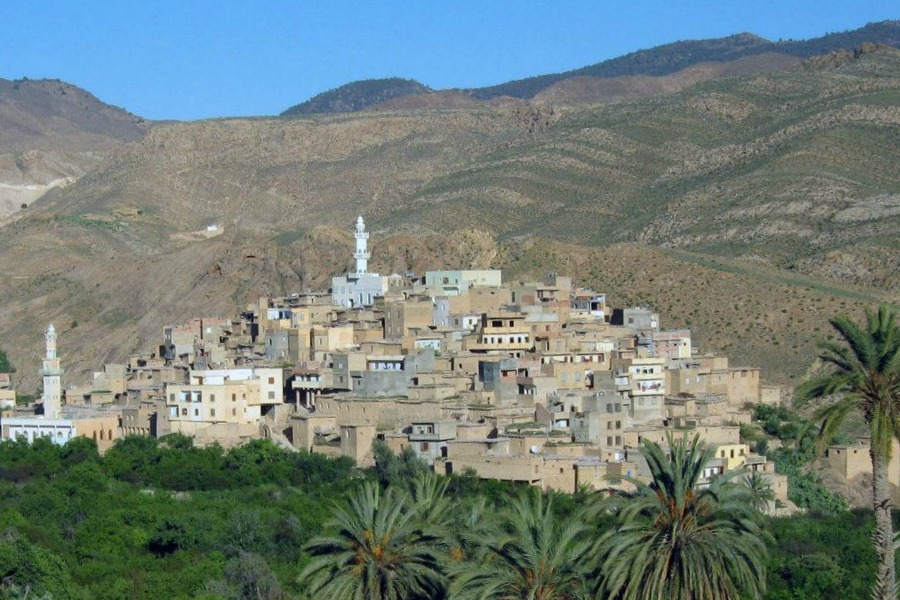

- Location within Algeria
- Coordinates: 35.182508°N 6.006775°E
- Country: Algeria
- Province: Batna

Population (2008)
  - Total: 13,510
- Time zone: UTC+1 (West Africa Time)

Menaa is a town in north-eastern Algeria.
