= Ouled Ammar =

Town in Algeria

Coordinates: 36°29′N 1°39′E

- Country: Algeria
- Province: Batna
- Time zone: UTC+1 (West Africa Time)

Ouled Ammar is a town in north-eastern Algeria.
