= Abdelkader Azil =

Coordinates: 35°22′N 5°11′E

Metkaouak
- Country: Algeria
- Province: Batna
- Time zone: UTC+1 (West Africa Time)

Abdelkader Azil (Arabic: عبد القادر عزيل) is a town in north-eastern Algeria. It was known as Metkaouak before its name was officially changed in May 1993. In 2008, its population was 14,304.
