= Oued El Ma =

Town in Algeria

Coordinates: 35°39′N 6°00′E

- Nickname: Bernal
- Country: Algeria
- Province: Batna

Population
  - Total: 11,219
- (2008, City Population)
- Time zone: UTC+1 (West Africa Time)

Oued El Ma is a small town in the Aures region, and administratively is a municipality (French: commune) in the province of Batna. The name Oud El Ma is derived from the Berber name ″Ighzer n'Alma″, with 'Oud' means river that come from the mountains and 'Alma' means the mount of Telmet mountain.
