= Foum Toub =

Coordinates: 35°24′N 6°33′E

- Country: Algeria
- Province: Batna
- Time zone: UTC+1 (West Africa Time)

Foum Toub is a town in north-eastern Algeria.
