= Seggana =

Coordinates: 35°21′56″N 5°34′10″E

- Country: Algeria
- Province: Batna
- Time zone: UTC+1 (West Africa Time)

Seggana is a town in north-eastern Algeria.

In the early 20th century, the sheikh of Seggana was a prominent religious figure in Algeria.
