= Gosbat =

Coordinates: 35°40′N 5°31′E

- Country: Algeria
- Province: Batna
- Time zone: UTC+1 (West Africa Time)

Gosbat (Arabic: القصبات) is a town in northeastern Algeria.
