= Tighanimine =

Coordinates: 35°10′N 6°15′E

- Country: Algeria
- Province: Batna
- Time zone: UTC+1 (West Africa Time)

Tighanimine is a town in Batna Province, north-eastern Algeria. It is located on Abiod Valley. There are some small Ancient Roman ruins nearby.
