= Hidoussa =

Coordinates: 35°30′N 5°54′E

- Country: Algeria
- Province: Batna
- Time zone: UTC+1 (West Africa Time)

Hidoussa is a town in north-eastern Algeria.
