= Kimmel, Algeria =

Coordinates: 35°13′00″N 6°32′40″E

- Country: Algeria
- Province: Batna
- Time zone: UTC+1 (West Africa Time)

Kimmel, Algeria is a town in north-eastern Algeria. As of 2008, the town has a population of 4,355 people.
