= Tkoutt =

Tkoutt تكوت Tkukt
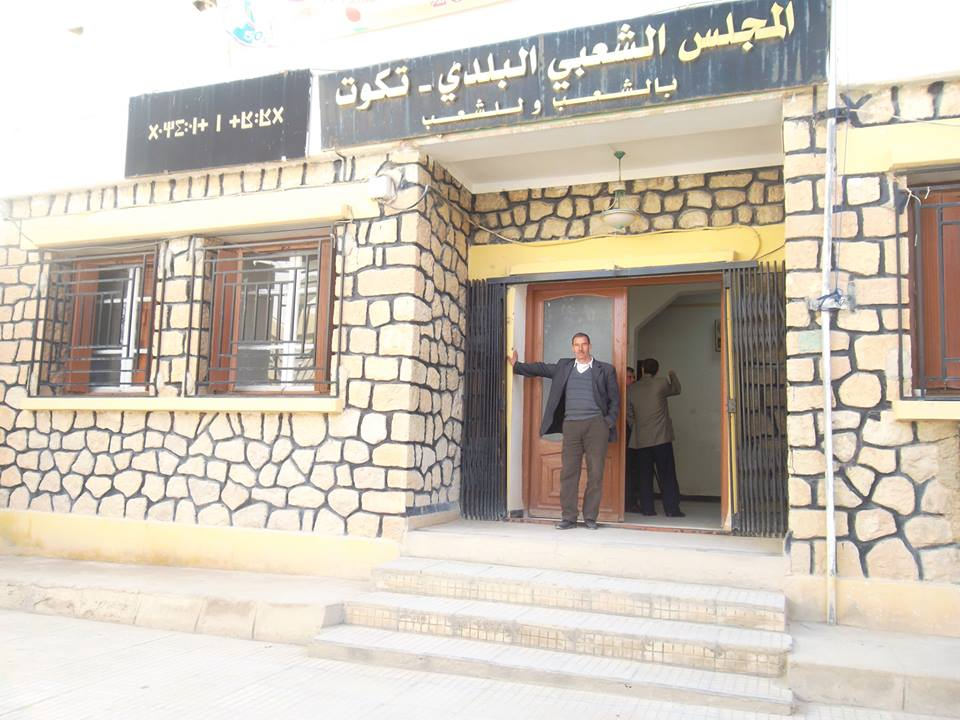

- Location within Algeria
- Coordinates: 35.1392°N 6.30861°E
- Country: Algeria
- Province: Batna
- Time zone: UTC+1 (West Africa Time)

Tkoutt (in the Berber language: Tkukt or Kukt or ⵝⴾⵓⴾⵝ) is a town in north-eastern Algeria.
