= Amdoukal =

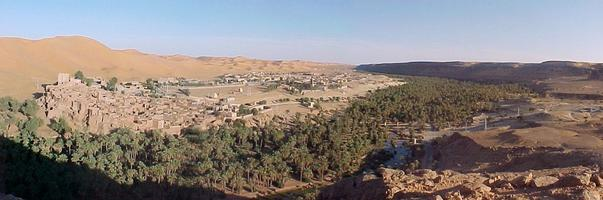

- Coordinates: 35°07′47″N 5°10′19″E
- Country: Algeria
- Province: Batna

Population (2008)
  - Total: 9,010
- Time zone: UTC+1 (West Africa Time)

Amdoukal (in Arabic: امدكال, or أم دكال; in French: M'Doukal; in Amazigh: ⴰⵎⴷⵓⴽⴻⵍ; in Latin: Acquaviva) is an ancient and historic city that is located in the province of Batna, Algeria, situated 122 km (75.8 mi) southwest of the provincial capital, and 35 km (21.8 mi) south of Barika; other sources locate it in nourthwest of Biskra.

== City's locals ==
The population of the city was estimated to be 7514 inhabitants in 1998, and the most contemporary inidicated to be 9010 in 2008. The city is of Berber ethnicity, with a dominant Sufi orientation. The livelihood of the locals mainly depends on agriculture and farming, and the region is considered a rural area. The region's area reaches 252.14 km² (25214 ha).

== Landmarks & archaeologies ==
The region includes an ancient ksar (castle) that is located between three major regions: El-Hodna, the Aurès, and the Ziban.

There are local demands to the authorities to restore the archaeological sites of the region, most importantly, the ksar of Amdoukal. This site is believed to date back to the third century, and its mosques in the 16th century were assembly points for pilgrim caravans. French scientific expeditions had investigated the site during the French occupation, and a research paper on the subject was published in 1941.

== The naming ==
The name of the region (i.e. Amdoukal) is believed to be a Berber phrase (in Berberic/Amazigh writing system: ⴰⵎⴷⵓⴽⴻⵍ) that means "the friends" or "the beloved ones", whereas the Latin name (i.e. Acquaviva) means "the living water", which indicates its flowing springs and fresh water since the ancient eras.
