= Ouled Si Slimane =

Coordinates: 35°36′39″N 5°37′58″E

- Country: Algeria
- Province: Batna
- Time zone: UTC+1 (West Africa Time)

Ouled Si Slimane is a town in north-eastern Algeria.
