= Djerma, Algeria =

Coordinates: 35.662335°N 6.309724°E

- Country: Algeria
- Province: Batna
- Time zone: UTC+1 (West Africa Time)

Djerma, Algeria is a town in north-eastern Algeria.
