= Tilatou =

Coordinates: 35°19′N 5°47′E

- Country: Algeria
- Province: Batna
- Time zone: UTC+1 (West Africa Time)

Tilatou is a town in north-eastern Algeria.
