= Bitam, Batna =

Coordinates: 35°18′N 5°18′E

Bitam, Algeria
- Country: Algeria
- Province: Batna
- Time zone: UTC+1 (West Africa Time)

Bitam (Arabic: بيطام) is a municipality in north-eastern Algeria in the Batna Province.

In 2008, its population was 11,855.

Bitam was a douar with 4,309 people at the time of the 1916 Aurès revolt against French colonial authorities.
