= Chir, Algeria =

Chir شير ⵛⵉⵔ

- Location within Algeria
- Coordinates: 35.21283°N 6.09805°E
- Country: Algeria
- Province: Batna
- Time zone: UTC+1 (West Africa Time)

Nouader is a town in northeastern Algeria.
