= Sefiane =

Town in Algeria

Coordinates: 35°26′29″N 5°33′29″E

- Country: Algeria
- Province: Batna
- Time zone: UTC+1 (West Africa Time)

Sefiane is a town in north-eastern Algeria.
