= Ouled Sellam =

- Nickname: Ouled Sellem
- M'cil, Ouled Sellam
- Coordinates: 0°49′32″N 5°52′56″E
- Country: Algeria
- Province: Batna

Government
  - Ghenam: Ghenam
- Elevation: 1,000 m (3,300 ft)

Population (2008)
  - Total: 19,610
- Chaoui
- Time zone: UTC+1 (West Africa Time)

Ouled Sellam council "Commune" in Batna Province. It is situated in north-eastern Algeria, about 70 km on the RN77 north-west of the city of Batna by the borders with "Setif". The main village is called M'cil, where the local council and schools are, also a hospital and a football stadium.
