= Bouzina =

Bouzina بوزينة ⴱⵓⵣⵉⵏⴰ

- Location within Algeria
- Coordinates: 35.283333°N 6.116667°E
- Country: Algeria
- Province: Batna

Area
  - Land: 194 km^{2} (75 sq mi)
- Elevation: 929 m (3,048 ft)

Population (2022)
  - Total: 14,548
- Time zone: UTC+1 (GMT+1)

Bouzina is a town in north east Algeria. It has an estimated population of roughly 13,500 residents, with a total area of 194 km².

== Geography ==
Bouzina is located 200 km inland from the southern coast of the Mediterranean Sea, in a mountainous area with an average altitude of 929 meters. It is surrounded by 8 other similar towns within a 20 km radius - Tenient el Abed (7.8 km), Chir (8 km), Ben Foudhala el Hakania (11.3 km), Oued Taga (11.5 km), Meena (15 km), Tighergar (19.1 km), Tighanimine (19.4 km) and Maafa (19.8 km).

== People ==
The small city's population consists mainly of three ethnic groups, which can be geographically divided into three districts: the Aith Nasse occupying the southern district, the Aith Abdi occupying the northern district and finally the Aith Bouzina living in the middle district.

All Bouzina natives speak a Berber dialect known as Chawi.

Residents of this mountainous area experience tough living conditions such as volatile weather, relative isolation and lack of governmental support.

The people of Bouzina share physical features that are different from those in surrounding areas, with lighter complexion and hair with lighter colored eyes.
