= Seriana =

- Country: Algeria
- Province: Batna
- Time zone: UTC+1 (West Africa Time)

Seriana (Berber languages: Taseriant;Arabic: سريانة) is a town in Batna Province, Algeria, at 35°41′30″N 06°11′11″E. In the colonial period, it was called Pasteur. It has been identified as the ancient Roman Catholic Diocese of Lamiggiga.

An arms factory, the Entreprise des Réalisations Industrielles de Seriana, is located there. Khaled Nezzar was born in the area.

The municipality has a population of 11,000 as of 2002.
