= Batna Province =

Province of Algeria

Batna Province ولاية باتنة
- Province
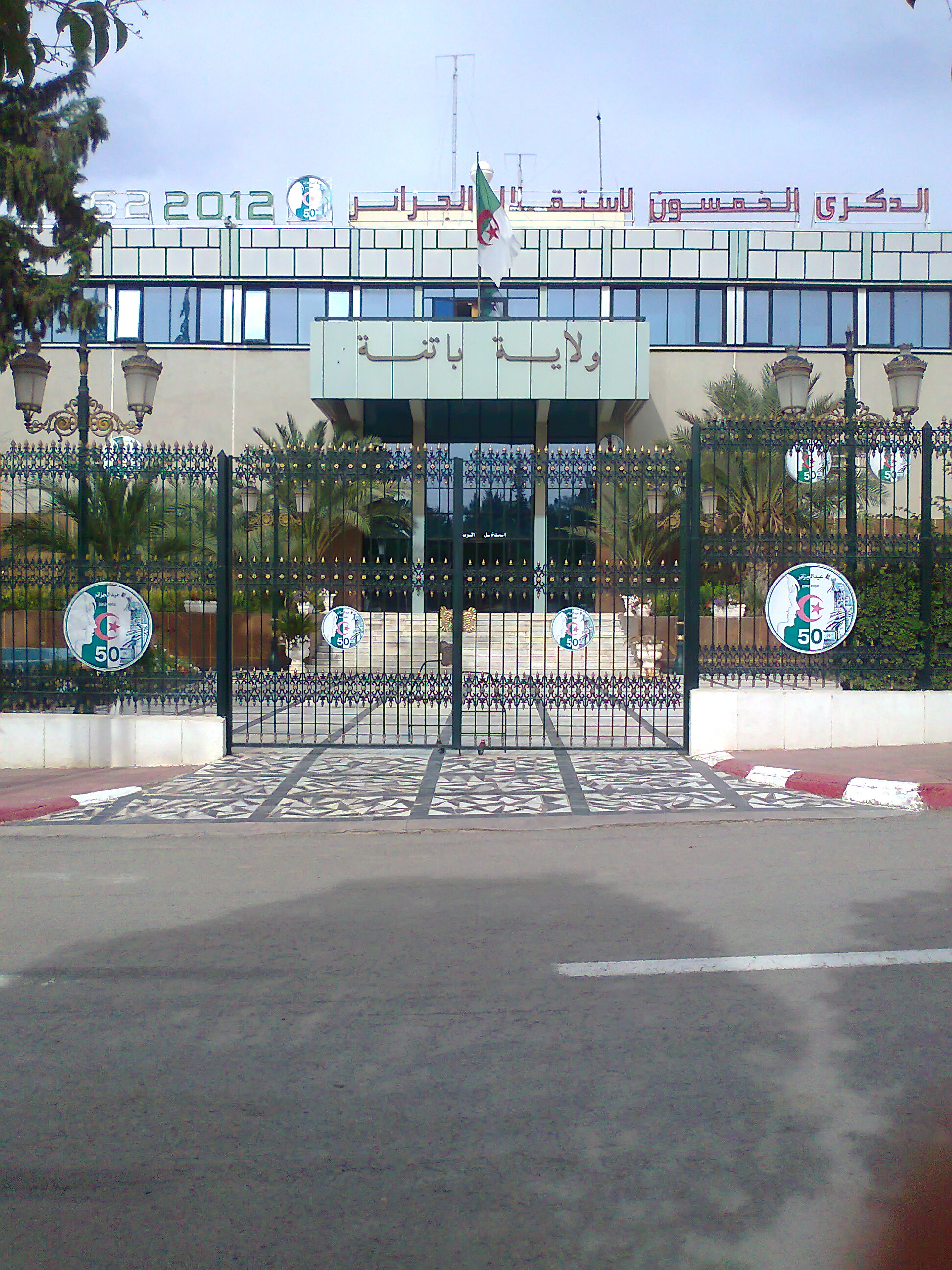
- The headquarters of the wilaya of Batna.

- Map of Algeria highlighting Batna
- Coordinates: 35°47′N 06°03′E
- Country: Algeria
- Capital: Batna

Government
  - PPA president: Mr. Soltani El Arbi (FLN)
  - Wāli: Mr. Bouazgui Abdelkader

Area
  - Total: 12,192 km^{2} (4,707 sq mi)

Population (2008)
  - Total: 1,128,030
  - Density: 92.522/km^{2} (239.63/sq mi)
- Time zone: UTC+01 (CET)
- Area Code: +213 (0) 33
- ISO 3166 code: DZ-05
- Districts: 21
- Municipalities: 61
- Website: Wilaya-batna.gov.dz

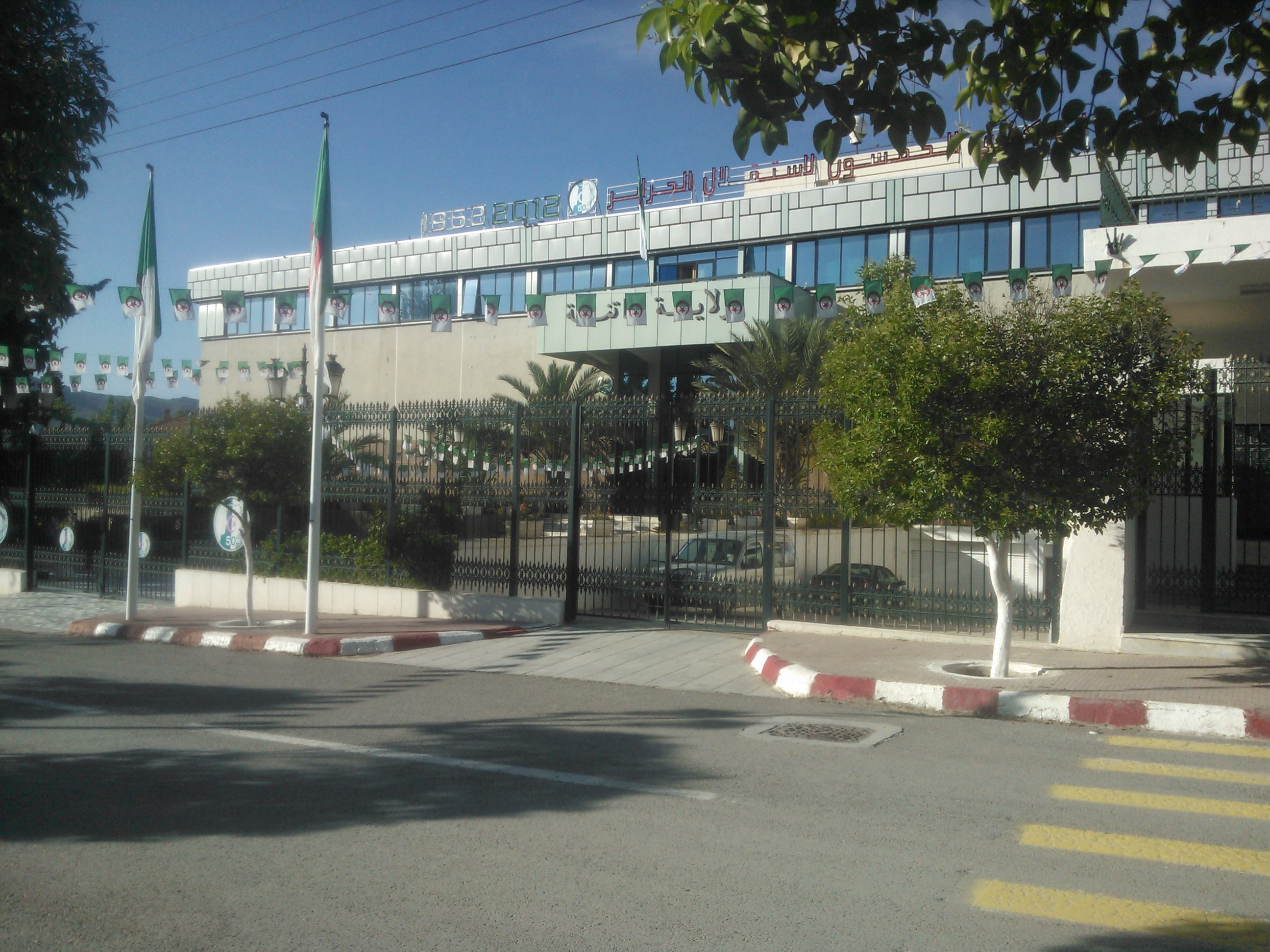
The headquarters of the wilaya of Batna City.

Batna Province (Arabic: ولاية باتنة, romanized: Wilāyat Bātnah) is a province of Algeria, in the region of Aurès. The capital is Batna. Localities in this province include N'Gaous, Merouana and Timgad. Belezma National Park is in the Belezma Range area of the province.

== Administrative divisions ==
It is made up of 21 districts and 61 municipalities.

The districts are:

1. Aïn Djasser
2. Aïn Touta
3. Arris
4. Barika
5. Batna
6. Bouzina
7. Chemora
8. Djezzar
9. El Madher
10. Ichmoul
11. Menaâ
12. Merouana
13. N'Gaous
14. Ouled Si Slimane
15. Ras El Aioun
16. Seggana
17. Seriana
18. T'Kout
19. Tazoult
20. Théniet El Abed
21. Timgad

The municipalities are:

1. Aïn Djasser
2. Aïn Touta
3. Aïn Yagout
4. Amantan
5. Amdoukal
6. Arris
7. N'Gaous
8. Batna
9. Ben Foudhala El Hakania
10. Bitam
11. Boulhilat
12. Boumagueur
13. Boumia
14. Bouzina
15. Djerma
16. Djezzar
17. Draa Etine
18. El Hassi
19. El Madher
20. Fesdis
21. Foum Toub
22. Ghassira
23. Chemora
24. Gosbat
25. Guigba
26. Hayat
27. Hidoussa
28. Ichmoul
29. Inoughissen
30. Kimmel
31. Ksar Bellezma
32. Larbaâ
33. Lazrou
34. Lemsane
35. Mâafa
36. Menâa
37. Merouana
38. Abdelkader Azil
39. N'Gaous
40. Chir
41. Oued Chaâba
42. Oued El Ma
43. Oued Taga
44. Ouled Ammar
45. Ouled Aouf
46. Ouled Fadel
47. Ouled Sellam
48. Ouled Si Slimane
49. Ouyoun El Assafir
50. Rahbat
51. Ras Ei Aioun
52. Sefiane
53. Seggana
54. Seriana
55. Talkhamt
56. Taxlent
57. Tazoult
58. Teniet El Abed
59. Tighanimine
60. Tigherghar
61. Tilatou
62. Timgad
63. Tkout
64. Zana El Beida

== Geography ==
The origins of the name of the city and province of Batna are not clear, but most historians agree that it is of Arabic origin: m'batna, meaning: "Where we sleep this night". Capital of the highlands situated between the Tell Atlas in the north and the Saharan Atlas in the south, with the Chott el Hodna in the middle, it constitutes a naturally protected passage between south and north. Its climate is moderate, hot and dry during summer time; due to its altitude (it being 800 metres above sea level), the winter is tough, snowy and at times cold (with temperatures of −15 °C recorded on some cold winter nights). This geo-political position is the origin of the last economy merging city due to a high commercial exchange rate between the north's seaward opening, and the south's source of all the wealth of the country (including reserves of oil, natural gas, iron and many minerals).

== Population ==
Batna City is the fourth largest Algerian city in terms of population; the number of permanent inhabitants is estimated by the Office National de Recencement at 446,000 (as of 2000), though other sources closer to the province estimate closer to one million. A large part of the population is largely mixed from all surrounding villages which suffer from a heavy unemployment rate and isolation. The natives are named "Tamazight", or in the local dialect: "Chaouyas", (the plural of Chaoui). The presence of the Tamazight is historically established; the locals refer to "Jugurtha", "Massinissa" and especially "Dihya" or so called "Kahina", as their ascendants and history. The local resistance to the repetitive invasions is a source of proud and trivial culture; Phoenicians, Romans, Arabs and French. The word "Tamazight" in Chaoui (Berber) language means "Free men". As opposed to the surrounding villages (e.g. Arris, Fesdis, Ain Yagout, Kais, N'gaous, Merouana, Djerma, El Madher, Ouled Nail) where you can find pure chaoui, the city of Batna itself is very heterogeneous, including chaoui from Batna (like Ouled Sidi Yahia, Ouled Boujamâa), Biskra and Khenchla but also many non-berber or mixed families from the Algerian desert (from places such as Oued Souf, Tougourt, Msila and Ouled Jelle) and other places from the west, explaining the fact that the city is mostly arabophone.

== Economy ==
The economy is based on heavy industry launched during the first half of the 1970s. With chemicals, as well as with an industrial and textile base, the region attracts people from the whole region. The city offers a large choice of university orientation (15,000 students in 2001). The city urban structure is based on the old town buildings, narrow and highly populated; the actual city expansion policy is based on heavy works done the surrounding mountain flanks to provide enough buildable space.

== Life level ==
The rapid expansion of the city in the last 10 years is mainly due to the open market policy of the previous government, which was a benefit for many, but in the same way penalized many of the middle-class.

The continuously growing city results in an extreme level of inflation especially on the real estate domain where prices reach extreme levels (for example, ownership of one square meter of land in the city center costs $1000) where the lowest paid salaries are in the region of $180.

== Social life ==
The cultural aspect of the city was active during a time when the local theater group was giving continuous and innovating performances. The city consisted of 12 cinemas and 2 "cinemathèques", one culture house and many open museums across the province. Due to recent events, security problems and an influx of population into the city, the cultural life has been heavily affected, though recently, thanks to the work of young artists, culture is once again on the public scene.

== See also ==
- Hodna
