= List of cultural assets of Algeria =

List of cultural assets of Algeria includes monuments, natural sites and parks, and other cultural assets as classed by the Algerian Ministry of Culture. The Ministry's list was updated in September 2019 with 1,030 cultural assets across the country. Skikda Province has the highest number of assets at 131.

== Adrar Province ==
Adrar has seven cultural assets: four historical sites, two contemporary sites of cultural importance, and one nature reserve.

ID	Monument	Type	Municipality	Coordinates	Image
01-001	Kasbah of Melouka	Historic	Ouled Ahmed Timmi		Kasbah of Melouka
01-002	Oasis Rouge Hotel	Contemporary	Timimoun		Oasis Rouge Hotel
01-003	Adrar El Kadim Hospital	Contemporary	Adrar		Upload Photo
01-004	Touat-Gourara-Tidikelt cultural park	Nature reserve			Upload Photo
01-005	Ksar of Tamentit	Historic	Tamentit		Ksar of Tamentit
01-006	Independence square	Historic	Timimoun		Independence square
01-007	Martyrs square	Historic	Adrar	27°51′47″N 0°16′56″W	Martyrs square

== Aïn Defla Province ==
ID	Monument	Type	Municipality	Coordinates	Image
44-001	Sidi Ahmed Ben Youcef mosque	religious	Miliana		Sidi Ahmed Ben Youcef mosque

== Aïn Témouchent Province ==
ID	Monument	Type	Municipality	Coordinates	Image
46-001	Numidian Kingdom of Syphax (Siga)	Site/Capital/Ant.	Oulhaça El Gheraba	35°15′59″N 1°27′00″W	Upload Photo
46-002	Royal Mausoleum of Syphax	Site/Mausoleum.	Beni Saf	35°15′47″N 1°25′52″W	Royal Mausoleum of Syphax

== Algiers Province ==
ID	Monument	Type	Municipality	Coordinates	Image
16-001	Dolmens Bologhine Ibnou Ziri	Funerary/Prehistoric	Bologhine		Dolmens Bologhine Ibnou Ziri
16-002	Roman inscription carved in a stone in the façade of a building on the corner of rue Bab Azzoun and rue Caftan	Epigraph/Antiquity	Casbah		Upload Photo
16-003	Vestiges of fortifications known as Bastion XI	Fortification/Medieval	Casbah		Upload Photo
16-004	Ketchaoua Mosque	Islamic	Algiers	36°47′06″N 3°03′39″E	Ketchaoua Mosque
16-005	Ali Bitchin Mosque	Islamic	Casbah	36°47′13″N 3°03′43″E	Ali Bitchin Mosque
16-006	Djamâa El Kebir	religious/Islamic	Casbah	36°47′07″N 3°03′51″E	Djamâa El Kebir
16-007	Mosque Abderrahmane El-Tâalbi	Islamic	Casbah	36°47′17″N 3°03′35″E	Mosque Abderrahmane El-Tâalbi
16-008	Mosque Sidi Ramdane (Djamaâ Sidi Ramdane)	Islamic	Casbah	36°47′11″N 3°03′31″E	Mosque Sidi Ramdane (Djamaâ Sidi Ramdane)
16-009	Casbah of Algiers (World Heritage Site)	living city center/Medieval	Casbah	36°47′03″N 3°03′32″E	Casbah of Algiers (World Heritage Site)
16-010	Djamâa Safir (Safir Mosque)	Islamic	Casbah-Oued Koriche	36°43′56″N 3°05′15″E	Djamâa Safir (Safir Mosque)
16-011	Mosque Mohamed Cherif	Islamic	Casbah-Oued Koriche	36°47′02″N 3°03′29″E	Mosque Mohamed Cherif
16-012	Marabout of the "Jardin Marengo", known as Tomb of the Queen	funerary/Islam	Casbah-Oued Koriche		Upload Photo
16-013	Hassen Pacha marabout with cupola, known as Ben Ali, on street of the same name	Funerary/Islamic	Casbah-Oued Koriche		Upload Photo
16-014	Dar Hassen Pacha	Abode/Modern	Casbah-Oued Koriche		Upload Photo
16-015	Group of Moorish houses (Bastion 23) ex. rue du 14 juin	Abodes/Modern	Casbah-Oued Koriche		Upload Photo
16-016	Dar Es Souf (formerly court of assises)	Abode/Modern	Casbah-Oued Koriche		Upload Photo
16-017	Dar Kkhaznadji (former Archbishopric)	Abode/Modern	Casbah-Oued Koriche		Upload Photo
16-018	Dar Mustapha Pacha (formerly the Bibliothèque Nationale) Abode/Modern Casbah (Oued Koriche Casbah) (Fortress)	Fortress/Modern	Casbah-Oued Koriche	36°47′08″N 3°03′39″E	Dar Mustapha Pacha (formerly the Bibliothèque Nationale) Abode/Modern Casbah (Oued Koriche Casbah) (Fortress)
16-019	Djamaa el Djedid	Islamic	Casbah-Oued Koriche	36°47′06″N 3°03′47″E	Djamaa el Djedid
16-020	Vestiges of the wall of the Medina of Algiers, including the front (Bab Azzoun) and northwest (Bab El Oued)	Fortification element/Medieval	Casbah-Oued Koriche		Upload Photo
16-021	Turkish gate of the Arsenal	Access/Medieval	Casbah-Oued Koriche		Upload Photo
16-022	Penon gate	Access/Medieval	Casbah-Oued Koriche		Upload Photo
16-023	Wine stalls fountain	waterwork/Medieval	Oued Koriche		Upload Photo
16-024	Fountain of the Admiralty	Artwork/Modern	Casbah-Oued Koriche		Upload Photo
16-025	Altar bible in the Protestant church in rue Chartes	religious/Medieval	Casbah-Oued Koriche		Upload Photo
16-026	Religious objects in the synagogues of impasse Boutin N°2 and rue Médée	religious/Medieval	Casbah-Oued Koriche		Upload Photo
16-027	Law scroll and silver religious objects of the synagogue in place Randon on the 2nd and 3rd floors of the consistory building, 1 rue Volland	religious objects/medieval	Casbah-Oued Koriche		Upload Photo
16-028	Parchments known as séraphines and ornaments of the synagogue in rue Scipion Manus	Religious/Medieval	Casbah-Oued Koriche		Upload Photo
16-029	Jardin Marengo	Nature Park	Casbah-Oued Koriche		Upload Photo
16-030	federal forest known as the Bois de Boulogne	Nature Park	Birmandreis		Upload Photo
16-031	Belvedere on the crest road	Nature Park	Birmandreis		Upload Photo
16-032	Woods around the Fort l'empereur	Nature Park	El Biar		Upload Photo
16-033	Citadel of the Fort l'empereur	Fortification/Modern	El Biar		Upload Photo
16-034	North section of the saint Raphaël cliff including parcels or partial parcels 12225, 1296, 1300, 1309, 1313 and 1315 in El Biar	Nature Park	El Biar		Upload Photo
16-035	Northwest end of the Sidi-Ferruch peninsula containing Roman ruins	Ruins/Roman	Sidi-Fredj		Upload Photo
16-036	"second weber" villa and the pine forest surrounding it on the spur of the saint Raphaël cliff	Abode et SN/Mod	El Biar		Upload Photo
16-037	Bordj Polignac	Fortification/Modern	Bouzaréah		Upload Photo
16-038	Setting of the Bordj Polignac	Nature Park	Bouzaréah		Upload Photo
16-039	Mosque and marabouts called de Sidi Madjouba	funerary/religious/Islamic	Bouzaréah		Upload Photo
16-040	Cemetery of sidi Madjouba	funerary/Islamic	Bouzaréah		Upload Photo
16-041	Tombs/megaliths on the plateau of Beni Messous	funerary/prehistoric	Beni Messous		Upload Photo
16-042	Villa Hussein-Dey	Abode/Modern	Hussein Dey (commune)		Upload Photo
16-043	Site of the Villa Louvet	Nature Park	Hussein-Dey		Upload Photo
16-044	Villa des Arcades	Abode/Modern	El Madania		Upload Photo
16-045	site of the Villa des Arcades	Nature Park	El Madania		Upload Photo
16-046	Arab Fountains and marabout, or Hamma, place called les Platanes in the jardin d'Essai	Waterworks/Funeray/Modern	Sidi M'Hamed		Upload Photo
16-047	Villa Abdelatif	Abode/Modern	Sidi M'Hamed		Upload Photo
16-048	Villa Mahieddine	Abode/Modern	Sidi M'Hamed		Upload Photo
16-049	Public square	Nature Park	Bouzaréah		Upload Photo
16-050	Villa Mahieddine	Nature Park	Sidi M'Hamed		Upload Photo
16-051	Botanical Garden Hamma	Nature Park	Alger-Annassers	36°44′53″N 3°04′34″E	Botanical Garden Hamma
16-052	Parc de la liberté	Nature Park	Sidi M'Hamed		Upload Photo
16-053	Prison of Barbarossa	penitenciary/Modern	Casbah-Oued Koriche		Upload Photo
16-054	Mosaic of the mosque of Tadfina in Tlemcen, held in the Musée National des Antiquités.	Mosaic	Alger		Upload Photo
16-055	Lighthouse on Cape Caxine	Signal/Maritime/Modern	Sidi M'Hamed		Upload Photo
16-056	Turkish Fort of Bordj El Kiffane	Fortification/Medieval	Bordj El Bahri		Upload Photo
16-057	Forêt de Baïnem.		Baïnem		Upload Photo
16-058	Forêt de Sidi Fredj.		Sidi Fredj		Upload Photo
16-059	Djamaâ el Djazaïr.	religious/Islamic	Mohammedia, Algiers	36°44′06″N 3°08′36″E	Djamaâ el Djazaïr.
16-060	Mosquée El Oumma.	Religious/Islamic	Bologhine	36°48′24″N 3°02′30″E	Mosquée El Oumma.
16-061	Algiers Central Post Office.	Religious/Islamic	algiers	36°46′21″N 3°03′33″E	Algiers Central Post Office.

== Annaba Province ==
ID	Monument	Type	Municipality	Coordinates	Image
23-001	Cistern of Hippone (Hippo Regius)	waterwork/antiquity	Annaba		Upload Photo
23-002	Ruins of Hippone	ruins/antiquity	Annaba	36°52′58″N 7°45′03″E	Ruins of Hippone
23-003	Citadel, Fort of the Victims and the Remains of the Rampart of the City of Annaba	fortification	Annaba		Upload Photo

== Batna Province ==
ID	Monument	Type	Municipality	Coordinates	Image
05-001	Gorges of Tilatou	Nature Park	Tilatou		Gorges of Tilatou
05-002	Village of Bouzina	Nature Park	Bouzina	35°16′52″N 6°07′01″E	Village of Bouzina
05-003	Village of Tagoust	Nature Park	Menaa	35°13′37″N 6°02′31″E	Upload Photo
05-004	Village of Amentane	Nature Park	Tigherghar	35°07′02″N 5°56′19″E	Village of Amentane
05-005	Village of Tighanimine	Nature Park	Tighanimine		Village of Tighanimine
05-006	Canyon of Ghoufi	Nature Park	T'Kout, Ghassira	35°02′57″N 6°10′02″E	Canyon of Ghoufi
05-007	Ruins of the ancient municipality of Tobna	Ruins/antiquity	Bitam	35°20′59″N 5°20′58″E	Upload Photo
05-008	Mausoleum of the Numidian kings, known as Medracen	Funerary/antiquity	Boumia	35°42′26″N 6°26′04″E	Mausoleum of the Numidian kings, known as Medracen
05-009	Arc de triomphe of Markouna	Monument/antiquity	Tazoult	35°29′11″N 6°17′16″E	Arc de triomphe of Markouna
05-010	Territories and monuments of Lambaesis	Antiquity	Tazoult	35°29′25″N 6°15′17″E	Territories and monuments of Lambaesis
05-011	Territories and monuments of Thamugadi	Antiquity	Timgad (WHS)	35°29′05″N 6°28′07″E	Territories and monuments of Thamugadi
05-012	Gorges of Foum Ksentina	Nature Park	Oued Taga	35°24′08″N 6°24′03″E	Gorges of Foum Ksentina
05-013	Territories and monuments of the Diana Veteranorum (Zana) of antiquity	Ancient sites and monuments	Zanet El Beida	35°46′46″N 6°04′31″E	Territories and monuments of the Diana Veteranorum (Zana) of antiquity
05-014	Igelfen Granary	antiquity	Tigherghar		Upload Photo
05-015	Village of Menâa	Nature Park	Menâa	35°10′25″N 6°00′29″E	Village of Menâa
05-016	Granary of Baloul	monuments of antiquity	Tigherghar		Upload Photo

== El Bayadh Province ==
ID	Monument	Type	Municipality	Coordinates	Image
32-001	Merdoufa	cave/prehistoric	Ghassoul		Merdoufa

== Béjaïa Province ==
ID	Monument	Type	Municipality	Coordinates	Image
06-001	Ruins of the fortified walls of the Fouka Gate	Ruins/Medieval	Béjaïa	36°45′18″N 5°04′53″E	Ruins of the fortified walls of the Fouka Gate
06-002	Fort Moussa known as Fort Barral	Fortification/Medieval	Béjaïa	36°45′18″N 5°05′02″E	Fort Moussa known as Fort Barral
06-003	Casbah de Béjaïa	Fortification/Medieval	Béjaïa	36°45′05″N 5°05′02″E	Casbah de Béjaïa
06-004	Porte Sarrasine or sea gate	Access/Medieval	Béjaïa	36°45′12″N 5°05′15″E	Porte Sarrasine or sea gate
06-005	Corniche	Nature Park	Tichy		Upload Photo
06-006	Corniche	Nature Park	Aokas		Upload Photo
06-007	Corniche	Nature Park	Souk El Ténine		Upload Photo
06-008	Site of Tiklat	Archaeology site/Antiquity	El Kseur	36°39′21″N 4°50′18″E	Site of Tiklat
06-009	Roman cippus	funerary stone/Antiquity	Béjaïa	36°45′13″N 5°05′11″E	Roman cippus
06-010	Mihrab of the Ibn Tumart mosque	Religious/Islamic	Oued Ghir	36°42′49″N 5°01′14″E	Mihrab of the Ibn Tumart mosque
06-011	Citadel of the Zayyanid dynasty known as Lassouar	Fortification/Medieval	El Kseur		Citadel of the Zayyanid dynasty known as Lassouar
06-012	Roman cisterns	Antiquity	Béjaïa	36°45′25″N 5°05′01″E	Roman cisterns
06-013	Corniche	Nature Park	Béjaïa	36°46′29″N 5°06′20″E	Corniche

== Biskra Province ==
ID	Monument	Type	Municipality	Coordinates	Image
07-001	ruins of thermal baths	ruins/antiquity	Biskra		Upload Photo
07-002	Gemellae	ruins/antiquity	M'Lili		Upload Photo
07-003	Wooden door of the mosque	Architectural element	Sidi Okba	34°45′19″N 5°54′24″E	Wooden door of the mosque
07-004	Gorges and village of Djemina	Nature Park	M'Chouneche		Gorges and village of Djemina
07-005	Village of Kebach	Nature Park	M'Chouneche		Upload Photo
07-006	Gorges of Khenguet Sidi-Nadji	Nature Park	Khenguet Sidi Nadji		Upload Photo
07-007	Islamic village Khenguet Sidi-Nadji, cave carvings around Ain-Naga	prehistoric artwork	Aïn Naga		Upload Photo
07-008	milestone in Seba Mgata	Antiquity/navigation	El Kantara		Upload Photo
07-009	Inscription built into the gate of the caravanserail	Antiquity	El Outaya		Upload Photo
07-010	Ruins of the amphitheatre	Ruins/Antiquity	El Outaya		Upload Photo
07-011	Roman bridge	Antiquity	El Kantara	35°14′01″N 5°42′06″E	Roman bridge
07-012	Lapidary collection in the municipal museum	Artwork/antiquity	El Kantara	35°13′17″N 5°42′04″E	Lapidary collection in the municipal museum
07-013	Gorges of El Kantara	Nature Park	El Kantara	35°13′54″N 5°42′08″E	Gorges of El Kantara
07-014	Mosque of Sidi Khaled	Religious/Islam	Sidi Khaled	34°23′10″N 5°00′39″E	Mosque of Sidi Khaled
07-015	Zaouia tidjania				Upload Photo
07-016	Gorge of Sidi Masmoudi	Nature Park	M'Chouneche		Upload Photo

== Béchar Province ==
ID	Monument	Type	Municipality	Coordinates	Image
08-001	Ksar de Kenadsa	Living history	Kénadsa		Upload Photo
08-002	Ksar of Taghit	Living history	Taghit		Ksar of Taghit
08-003	Ksar of Beni Abbes	living history	Béni Abbès		Ksar of Beni Abbes
08-004	Necropolis (tumulus)				Upload Photo

== Blida Province ==
ID	Monument	Type	Municipality	Coordinates	Image
09-001	Chemin Abel de Chréa	nature park	Blida		Chemin Abel de Chréa

== Bordj Bou Arréridj Province ==
ID	Monument	Type	Municipality	Coordinates	Image
34-001	Ruins of the ancient city of Tihamamine	ruins/Antiquity	El Hamadia		Upload Photo

== Bouira Province ==
ID	Monument	Type	Municipality	Coordinates	Image
10-001	Forest of Azrou, Taouialt and Tikjda cantons	nature park	Bechloul		Upload Photo
10-002	Inscription and ancient fragments deposited in Sour El-Ghozlane on the esplanade	Antiquity/epigraph	Sour El-Ghozlane		Upload Photo

== Boumerdès Province ==
ID	Monument	Type	Municipality	Coordinates	Image
35-001	Zemmouri El Bahri	fortification/medieval	Zemmouri, Zemmouri El Bahri	36°48′03″N 3°33′55″E	Zemmouri El Bahri
35-002	Ferme Gautier	Torture center	Souk El Had, Titouna	36°42′27″N 3°35′34″E	Ferme Gautier

== Chlef Province ==
ID	Monument	Type	Municipality	Coordinates	Image
02-001	Mosaic of a labyrinth, moved from St. Reparatus to Algiers Cathedral	artwork/antiquity	Chlef		Upload Photo
02-002	Roman ruins of the Kalâa des ouled Abdallah	ruins/antiquity	Ténès		Roman ruins of the Kalâa des ouled Abdallah
02-003	Mosque of old Ténes	Islamic	Ténès		Upload Photo

== Constantine Province ==
ID	Monument	Type	Municipality	Coordinates	Image
25-001	Dolmens of Salluste near the ancient gardens of Constantine (Constantine)	funerary/prehistoric	Constantine		Upload Photo
25-002	Roman aqueduct	waterwork/antiquity	Constantine	36°21′01″N 6°37′03″E	Upload Photo
25-003	Roman bridge	roadwork/antiquity	Constantine	36°22′08″N 6°37′05″E	Upload Photo
25-004	Tomb of Praecillius	funerary/antiquity	Constantine		Upload Photo
25-005	Mosque of Souk El Ghezel (former Cathedral)	religious/medieval	Constantine	36°22′02″N 6°36′42″E	Mosque of Souk El Ghezel (former Cathedral)
25-006	Mosque of Sidi Lakhdar	Islamic	Constantine		Upload Photo
25-007	Part of the old madrassa enclosing the tombs of Salah Bey and his family	funerary/modern	Constantine		Upload Photo
25-008	Ahmed Bey Palace	Abode/Modern	Constantine	36°22′04″N 6°36′42″E	Ahmed Bey Palace
25-009	Ancient fragments and inscription in the square	ruins and epigraph	Constantine		Upload Photo
25-010	Inscription of the martyrs Saint Jacques and Saint Marien	Epigraph/Antiquity	Constantine		Upload Photo
25-011	Mosaic of Penthesilea discovered at Ouled Agla, held at the Constantine municipal building	artwork/antiquity	Constantine		Upload Photo
25-012	Objects in the museum of Constantine	collection/antiquity	Constantine		Objects in the museum of Constantine
25-013	Gorges of Rhummel	nature park	Constantine		Gorges of Rhummel
25-014	Dolmens and Cromlechs 35km south of Constantine Ras El Ain Bou Merzoug Ouled Rahmoun	funerary/prehistoric	Ouled Rahmoune		Upload Photo
25-015	Old town Constantine	living history	Constantine		Old town Constantine
25-016	Dolmens and cromlechs in place known as djebel Ksaibi 32 km from Constantine	funerary/prehistoric	Ouled Rahmoune		Upload Photo
25-017	Greek-Punic Mausoleum named Soumaâ	Funerary/ antiquity	El Khroub	36°16′20″N 6°43′31″E	Greek-Punic Mausoleum named Soumaâ
25-018	Dolmens and cromlechs in place known as Djebel Mazalaa 16 km from El Khroub	funerary/prehistoric	Ouled Rahmoune		Upload Photo

== Djelfa Province ==
ID	Monument	Type	Municipality	Coordinates	Image
17-001	Hadjra Sidi Boubeker (cave art)	Artwork/prehistoric	Aïn El Ibel		Upload Photo
17-002	Kheneg El-Hillal (cave art)	Artwork/prehistoric	Ain El Ibel		Upload Photo
17-003	Zeccar (cave art)	Artwork/prehistoric	Zeccar		Upload Photo
17-004	Dolmens of the Windmill of Djelfa	funerary/prehistoric	Djelfa		Upload Photo
17-005	Dolmens off the road from Algiers to Laghouat	funerary/prehistory	Djelfa		Upload Photo

== Ghardaïa Province ==
ID	Monument	Type	Municipality	Coordinates	Image
47-001	Ramparts of Beni Isguen	Fortification/Medieval	Ghardaïa	32°28′29″N 3°41′40″E	Ramparts of Beni Isguen
47-002	M'zab Valley	living city center	Ghardaïa		Upload Photo
47-003	Ksar of Metlili	living town center	Metlili		Upload Photo
47-004	Ksar of El Atteuf	living town center	Ghardaïa	32°28′32″N 3°44′48″E	Ksar of El Atteuf
47-005	Ksar of Bounoura	living town center	Ghardaïa	32°29′00″N 3°42′18″E	Ksar of Bounoura
47-006	Ksar of Melika	living town center	Ghardaïa		Ksar of Melika
47-007	Ksar of Ghardaïa	living town center	Ghardaïa	32°29′20″N 3°40′28″E	Ksar of Ghardaïa
47-008	Ksar of Berriane	living town center	Ghardaïa	32°50′00″N 3°46′00″E	Ksar of Berriane
47-009	Ksar of El Guerrara	living town center	Ghardaïa	32°47′25″N 4°29′32″E	Ksar of El Guerrara

== Guelma Province ==
ID	Monument	Type	Municipality	Coordinates	Image
24-001	Grottos of Djebel Taya (near Oued Charef Nature Park)	prehistoric	Bou Hamdane		Upload Photo
24-002	Roman swimming pool (Hammam Berda)	thermal baths/antiquity	Héliopolis		Upload Photo
24-003	Ruined theatre and thermal baths	Roman theatre of Calama, built with financing from a priestess of the imperial cult	Guelma	36°28′02″N 7°25′48″E	Ruined theatre and thermal baths
24-004	Ruins of Thibilis	ruins/antiquity	Bellaoua Announa		Ruins of Thibilis
24-005	Hammam Debagh (Meskhoutine)	thermal baths/antiquity	Hammam Debagh		Hammam Debagh (Meskhoutine)
24-006	Site Khenguet El Hadjar Site	nature/prehistoric	Salaout Announa		Upload Photo
24-007	Dolmens of Cheniour	funerary/prehistoric	Ain El Arbi		Upload Photo
24-008	Site of Ain Nechma	prehistoric	Ben-Djerrah		Upload Photo
24-009	Citadel Bouatfane	fortification/antiquity	Ain El Arbi		Upload Photo
24-010	Kef Bouzioune Zatara	antiquity	Bou Hachana		Upload Photo
24-011	Zaouia Cheikh El Hafnaoui Bedyar	Islamic	Beni Mezline		Upload Photo
24-012	Sour Ethakana el Kadiùm	fortification/modern	Guelma		Upload Photo
24-013	Dolmens and funerary grottos (necropolis).				Upload Photo

== Illizi Province ==
ID	Monument	Type	Municipality	Coordinates	Image
33-001	Tassili N'Ajjer (World Heritage Site)	prehistoric	Djanet	25°30′00″N 9°00′00″E	Tassili N'Ajjer (World Heritage Site)

== Jijel Province ==
ID	Monument	Type	Municipality	Coordinates	Image
18-001	Corniche Nature Park		El Aouana		Upload Photo
18-002	Corniche Nature Park		Ziama Mansouriah		Corniche Nature Park
18-003	Wonderful caves	Prehistoric/nature park	Ziama Mansouriah		Wonderful caves

== Khenchela Province ==
ID	Monument	Type	Municipality	Coordinates	Image
40-001	Valley of Oued Beni Barbar	nature park	Khenchela		Upload Photo
40-002	Gorges of the Oued El Arab river	nature park	Khenchela		Upload Photo
40-003	Grottos of Fringal	nature park	Khenchela		Upload Photo
40-004	Village of Djellal	nature park	Djellal		Upload Photo
40-005	Village of Tabardga	nature park	Charchar		Upload Photo
40-006	Village of Tizigarine	nature park	Bouhmama		Upload Photo
40-007	Baghai	medieval	Baghai		Upload Photo
40-008	Mausoleum Cédia (ksar el Djazia)				Upload Photo

== Laghouat Province ==
ID	Monument	Type	Municipality	Coordinates	Image
03-001	Cave drawings	Artwork/prehistoric	El Ghicha	33°55′04″N 2°04′36″E	Cave drawings
03-002	Rocher Fromentin	Nature Park	Laghouat		Rocher Fromentin
03-003	Oued Remailia cave drawings	Artwork/prehistoric	Sidi Makhlouf		Upload Photo
03-004	El Hasbaia	prehistoric site	Laghouat		Upload Photo
03-005	Zaouia Tidjania	Islamic	Aïn Madhi		Zaouia Tidjania
03-006	Centrale électrique diesel de Laghouat	Modern industry	Laghouat		Upload Photo

== Mascara Province ==
ID	Monument	Type	Municipality	Coordinates	Image
29-001	Ruins of Aquae Sienses	Ruins/antiquity	Bou Hanifia (El Hammamet)		Upload Photo
29-002	Mosque at the Douar of El Guetna	religious/Islamic	Hacine		Upload Photo
29-003	Mosque of Ain Beida	religious/Islamic	Mascara		Upload Photo
29-004	Djemaâ El-Kebir Mosque	religious/Islamic	Mascara		Upload Photo
29-005	Ruins of the Zaouia of Sidi Mahieddine	religious/Islamic/ruins	Sidi Kada		Upload Photo
29-006	Baths known as Emir Abdel Kader's	thermal baths/modern	Sidi Kada		Baths known as Emir Abdel Kader's
29-007	Earthen ramparts and battlements	fortification/modern, ruins related to the Emir AbdelKader	Sidi Kada		Upload Photo
29-008	Woods of olive trees near the ruins, related to the tradition of the Emir Abdelkader	nature park	Sidi Kada		Upload Photo
29-009	Prehistoric deposit of Ternifine	prehistoric	Tighenif		Upload Photo
29-010	Site of Dardara tree	Commemorative: Tree beneath which the tribes pledged allegiance to the Emir Abdelkader on 27 November 1832	Ghriss		Site of Dardara tree
29-011	Headquarters of the Emir Abdelkader	military building/modern	Mascara		Upload Photo
29-012	Tribunal of the Emir Abdelkader	judicial building/modern	Mascara		Upload Photo

== Médéa Province ==
ID	Monument	Type	Municipality	Coordinates	Image
26-001	funerary items unearthed from the ancient necropolis	funerary/antiquity	Djouab		Upload Photo
26-002	Territories and monuments of Rapidum		Djouab		Upload Photo
26-003	Site of Benia constituting the site of the ancient city of Yachir 4 km (2.5 mi) southwest of Tletat Ed Douair	capital/medieval	Tletat Ed Douair		Upload Photo
26-004	Dar El Bey named Dar EL Emir Abdelkader	commemorative/modern	Médéa		Upload Photo
26-005	Remains of house, enclosure, door in Rapidum	antiquity/ruins	Djouab		Upload Photo

== Mila Province ==
ID	Monument	Type	Municipality	Coordinates	Image
43-001	Ruins of Milev - National/1910	Ruins/antiquity	Mila		Upload Photo
43-002	Baths of Pomperianus - National/L.1900	thermal baths	Oued Athmania		Upload Photo
43-003	Old Mila - National/1999	site/antiquity	Mila		Old Mila - National/1999

== Mostaganem Province ==
ID	Monument	Type	Municipality	Coordinates	Image
27-001	Grand Mosque	Islamic	Mostaganem		Upload Photo

== M'Sila Province ==
ID	Monument	Type	Municipality	Coordinates	Image
28-001	Kalâa of the Beni Hammad	medieval (World Heritage Site)	Mâadid		Upload Photo
28-002	Camps of El Djorf	prison/medieval	Ouled Derradj		Upload Photo

== Naâma Province ==
ID	Monument	Type	Municipality	Coordinates	Image
45-001	Necropolis of Djorf Torba	funerary/antiquity	Aïn Séfra		Upload Photo
45-002	Traces of Sidi Cheikh's mare in Theniet Azzia Nature Park	nature park (footprints)	Aïn Séfra		Upload Photo

== Oran Province ==
ID	Monument	Type	Municipality	Coordinates	Image
31-001	Ruins of Portus Magnus	Ruins/Antiquity	Bethioua	35°48′17″N 0°15′35″W	Upload Photo
31-002	Punic caseity known as les Andalouses	ruins/antiquity	Boutlélis		Upload Photo
31-003	Abri Alain	prehistoric	Oran		Upload Photo
31-004	Grottos of El Cuartel	prehistoric	Oran		Upload Photo
31-005	Mosque of the Bey Mohamed el-Kébir	18th century mosque	Oran	35°42′19″N 0°38′12″W	Mosque of the Bey Mohamed el-Kébir
31-006	Hassan Pasha Mosque	18th century Ottoman mosque	Oran	35°42′19″N 0°39′00″W	Hassan Pasha Mosque
31-007	Minaret du campement	Minaret of an 18th century mosque	Oran	35°42′16″N 0°39′16″W	Minaret du campement
31-008	Minaret of the Mosquée du Pacha	polygonal minaret in Ottoman style	Oran	35°42′17″N 0°39′00″W	Minaret of the Mosquée du Pacha
31-009	Caravansérail (Modern) (Oran)	gate of a caravansérail built in 1849, remontée promenade ex-de Létang.	Oran	35°42′29″N 0°38′43″W	Caravansérail (Modern) (Oran)
31-010	Palace of the Bey	Ottoman palace, late 18th century	Oran	35°42′19″N 0°38′57″W	Palace of the Bey
31-011	Spanish gate of the castle	Spanish gate of the Casbah	Oran	35°42′07″N 0°39′16″W	Spanish gate of the castle
31-012	Pavilion of the Favorite	Ottoman pavilion on the grounds of the palace of the bey	Oran	35°42′18″N 0°38′58″W	Pavilion of the Favorite
31-013	Mohamed El Houari Mosque	Small mosque with minaret and koubba built in 1799/1800, with a cenotaph to Sidi El Houari.	Oran	35°42′11″N 0°39′15″W	Mohamed El Houari Mosque
31-014	military logistics gate	military construction/modern	Oran	35°42′29″N 0°39′17″W	Upload Photo
31-015	Spanish escutcheon carved on the outside of the wall surrounding the new castle	Vestiges of a Spanish escutcheon from the reign of Philip V of Spain	Oran	35°42′25″N 0°38′46″W	Upload Photo
31-016	Tambour de San José	Vigie fortifiée espagnole (16th century), overlooking the mouth of the Ras el Aïn ravine.	Oran	35°42′05″N 0°39′12″W	Upload Photo
31-017	Fountain of Place Emerat	Spanish Fountain in the quartier de la Marine, 1789.	Oran	35°42′24″N 0°39′20″W	Fountain of Place Emerat
31-018	Porte de Santon	Gate of Oran, towards Mers el-Kébir, 1754.	Oran	35°42′20″N 0°39′23″W	Upload Photo
31-019	Porte de Castel	Porte de Canastel, east entrance to old Oran	Oran	35°42′17″N 0°39′09″W	Upload Photo
31-020	Entrance gate to the new château	access/modern	Oran	35°42′21″N 0°38′59″W	Upload Photo
31-021	Posada Espagnole	House in the Moorish or Andalusian style, used as first a brothel then an inn (demolished?)	Oran	35°42′25″N 0°39′21″W	Upload Photo
31-022	Chapel of Santa Cruz	Votive chapel to the Virgin Mary, son the Aïdour (1850/1959)	Oran	35°42′35″N 0°39′48″W	Chapel of Santa Cruz
31-023	Inscription in the rue du vieux château	epigraph/modern	Oran		Upload Photo
31-024	Watchtower in corner of wall surrounding the new château	watchtower in corner of southeast bastion of the new château	Oran	35°42′19″N 0°38′51″W	Upload Photo
31-025	Objects of antiquity in the Musée Ahmed Zabana	collection	Oran	35°41′45″N 0°38′43″W	Objects of antiquity in the Musée Ahmed Zabana
31-026	Mosaic from a house in Bethioua in the Musée Ahmed Zabana	Mosaic known as "of the fighting" from the ruins of Portus Magnus (Bethioua).	Oran	35°41′45″N 0°38′43″W	Mosaic from a house in Bethioua in the Musée Ahmed Zabana
31-027	Promenande Ibn Badis formerly létang Natural Park (Oran)	Tree-lined promenade at the foot of the north courtines of the "Château Neuf", 1836.	Oran	35°42′25″N 0°38′54″W	Promenande Ibn Badis formerly létang Natural Park (Oran)
31-028	Site of the Murdjajo	Nature Park	Oran		Upload Photo
31-029	Cemetery known as "Des cholériques" (of the choleric) in the Ras El Ain ravine	funerary/modern	Oran		Upload Photo
31-030	Hôtel de la division.	Same monument as the palace of the Bey, used as residence and seat of the état-major of the general commanding Oran division from 1831 to 1962	Oran		Upload Photo
31-031	Mosaic from Bethioua EX/ ST LEU in the Musée Ahmed Zabana (Oran)	Mosaic titled "départure of Bacchus for India", from the ruins of Portus Magnus	Oran	35°41′45″N 0°38′43″W	Upload Photo
31-032	prehistoric collection in the Musée Ahmed Zabana (Oran)	collection/prehistoric	Oran	35°41′45″N 0°38′43″W	Upload Photo

== Ouargla Province ==
ID	Monument	Type	Municipality	Coordinates	Image
30-001	Ruins of Sedrata	capital/Islamic	Ouargla		Upload Photo
30-002	Valley of the Oued Djerat	prehistoric	Ouargla		Upload Photo
30-003	Ksar of Ouargla	living city	Ouargla		Upload Photo

== El Oued Province ==
ID	Monument	Type	Municipality	Coordinates	Image
39-001	Zaouia Tidjania	Islamic	Guemar		Upload Photo

== Oum El Bouaghi Province ==
ID	Monument	Type	Municipality	Coordinates	Image
04-001	Dolmens and Cromlechs	funerary/prehistoric	Sigus		Upload Photo

== Relizane Province ==
ID	Monument	Type	Municipality	Coordinates	Image
48-001	Ruins of Kaoua	Ruins/Antiquity	Ammi Moussa	35°55′08″N 1°12′01″E	Ruins of Kaoua

== Saïda Province ==
ID	Monument	Type	Municipality	Coordinates	Image
20-001	Grottos of Oued Saïda	prehistoric	Saïda		Upload Photo
20-002	Timzighine Site	prehistoric	Youb		Upload Photo
20-003	Prehistoric site of Ain Menaaé	prehistoric	Aïn El Hadjar		Upload Photo

== Sétif Province ==
ID	Monument	Type	Municipality	Coordinates	Image
19-001	Village of Tidget Guergour	nature park	Ghenzet		Upload Photo
19-002	Gorges of Chabet Akra	nature park	Ghenzet	36°30′33″N 5°16′11″E	Gorges of Chabet Akra
19-003	Territories and monuments of Cuicul	Site and monuments/Antiquity	Djémila (WHS)	36°19′11″N 5°44′11″E	Territories and monuments of Cuicul
19-004	Citadel of Sétif	fortification/antiquity	Sétif		Upload Photo
19-005	Archeology zone: quarter of the basilica, rampart, circus, quarter of the temple	site and monuments/antiquity	Sétif		Upload Photo
19-006	Ikdjen	archaeology site/medieval	Aïn El Kebira		Upload Photo
19-007	Ain El Fouara Fountain	Artwork/Medieval	Sétif	36°11′22″N 5°24′18″E	Ain El Fouara Fountain

== Sidi Bel Abbes Province ==
ID	Monument	Type	Municipality	Coordinates	Image
22-001	Bossuet internment camps	penitentiary/modern	Dhaya		Upload Photo

== Skikda Province ==
ID	Monument	Type	Municipality	Coordinates	Image
21-001	Roman theatre and architectural fragments it contains (Skikda)	antiquity	Skikda		Upload Photo
21-002	Objects in the state museum	antiquity	Skikda		Upload Photo
21-003	Canvas representing entombment of Christ attributed to Anthony van Dyck	Artwork	Skikda		Upload Photo
21-004	great mosque	Islamic	Collo		Upload Photo

== Souk Ahras Province ==
ID	Monument	Type	Municipality	Coordinates	Image
41-001	Ruins of Byzantine palace	ruins/Antiquity	M'Daourouch		Upload Photo
41-002	Roman mausoleum	funerary/antiquity	M'Daourouch		Upload Photo
41-003	Territories and monuments of Thubusicum Numidarum	site/antiquity	Khemissa		Upload Photo
41-004	Remains of citadels, Byzantine enclosure of Tiffech	Antiquity	Tiffech		Upload Photo
41-005	Statues and fragments of antiquity from municipal garden	artworks/antiquity	Souk Ahras		Upload Photo
41-006	Roman mausoleum in the douar of the Ouled Soukies (Ksar El Ahmar)	funerary/antiquity	Taoura (Thagora)		Upload Photo

== Tamanrasset Province ==
ID	Monument	Type	Municipality	Coordinates	Image
11-001	Abalessa and tomb (Tin-Hinan)	funerary monument/prehistoric	Tamanrasset, (Site of the Ahaggar)	23°17′00″N 5°32′00″E	Abalessa and tomb (Tin-Hinan)

== El Taref Province ==
ID	Monument	Type	Municipality	Coordinates	Image
36-001	El Kala church	religious/Modern	El Kala	36°53′51″N 8°26′40″E	Upload Photo
36-002	Ruins of the Bastion de France	Ruins/Modern	El Kala	36°55′04″N 8°20′24″E	Ruins of the Bastion de France

== Tébessa Province ==
ID	Monument	Type	Municipality	Coordinates	Image
12-001	Stations abris (shelter) of Bir Sedet	prehistoric	Chéria		Upload Photo
12-002	Garet Retba	prehistoric	Chéria		Upload Photo
12-003	Chabet Retba	prehistoric	Chéria		Upload Photo
12-004	Chabet Siboun	prehistoric	Chéria		Upload Photo
12-005	Damou Kermaia	prehistoric	Chéria		Upload Photo
12-006	Fadje Relilai Mengart	prehistoric	Chéria		Upload Photo
12-007	Foum Relilai Menguebba	prehistoric	Chéria		Upload Photo
12-008	Merget Sem El-Garbi	prehistoric	Chéria		Upload Photo
12-009	Oued Retem	prehistoric	Chéria	34°53′48″N 7°47′15″E	Upload Photo
12-010	Relilai Tlidjen	prehistoric	Chéria	35°02′27″N 7°41′20″E	Upload Photo
12-011	Ruins	Ruins/antiquity	Morsott		Upload Photo
12-012	Gorges of Bou Akkous	Nature Park	Morsott		Upload Photo
12-013	Grottos of Bou Akkous	Nature Park	Morsott		Upload Photo
12-014	Village of Youkous	Nature Park	Hammamet	35°24′58″N 7°57′52″E	Upload Photo
12-015	Arch of Caracalla	Monument/antiquity	Tebessa	35°24′10″N 8°07′08″E	Arch of Caracalla
12-016	Amphitheatre, 4th century AD	Antiquity/venue	Tebessa	35°24′04″N 8°07′26″E	Upload Photo
12-017	Byzantine era wall	Fortification/antiquity	Tebessa	35°24′09″N 8°07′08″E	Byzantine era wall
12-018	ruins of the basilica of St Crispinus, 4th century AD	religious/antiquity	Tebessa	35°24′33″N 8°07′37″E	Upload Photo
12-019	Quarter of the Zaouia	excavation site/antiquity	Tebessa		Upload Photo
12-020	Thèveste	Site and monuments/antiquity	Tebessa	35°25′04″N 8°08′02″E	Upload Photo
12-021	Roman temple of Khalia	religious/antiquity	Tebessa	35°23′00″N 8°05′59″E	Upload Photo
12-022	Tower of Djebel Mestiri	surveillance/antiquity	Tebessa	35°25′04″N 7°59′30″E	Upload Photo

== Tiaret Province ==
ID	Monument	Type	Municipality	Coordinates	Image
14-001	Djeddar	Thirteen funerary monuments of late antiquity	Medroussa-Louhou	35°06′47″N 1°12′45″E	Djeddar
14-002	Bled Touta Lakania and grottos related to the tradition of the historian Ibn Khaldun	nature park	Frenda		Bled Touta Lakania and grottos related to the tradition of the historian Ibn Khaldun
14-003	Dolmens	funerary monument/prehistoric	Tiaret		Upload Photo
14-004	Tahert-Tagdemt	medieval	Tagdemt		Upload Photo

== Tindouf Province ==
ID	Monument	Type	Municipality	Coordinates	Image
37-001	Casbah of Belaâmach	living urban center	Tindouf		Upload Photo

== Tipaza Province ==
ID	Monument	Type	Municipality	Coordinates	Image
42-001	Cistern under the barracks	waterwork/antiquity	Cherchell		Upload Photo
42-002	Remains of the thermal baths, west and east	ruins/antiquity	Cherchell		Upload Photo
42-003	Remains of the amphitheatre	Antiquity/venue	Cherchell	36°36′19″N 2°11′26″E	Remains of the amphitheatre
42-004	Pulpit built in the year 981 of the Hijrah in the mosque	religious/Islamic	Cherchell		Upload Photo
42-005	Objects from Antiquity held in the Archaeological Museum of Cherchell	collection/antiquity	Cherchell	36°36′30″N 2°11′29″E	Objects from Antiquity held in the Archaeological Museum of Cherchell
42-006	Aqueduct 5km from Cherchell	waterwork/antiquity	Cherchell		Upload Photo
42-007	Caid Youcef, Roman ruins	ruins/antiquity	Cherchell		Upload Photo
42-008	Cape known as "les Trois Ilôts', or "the three islets"	ruins/antiquity	Cherchell		Upload Photo
42-009	Aqueduct in Sidi Amar	waterwork/antiquity	Sidi Amar		Upload Photo
42-010	Royal Mausoleum of Mauretania (Tomb of the Christian Woman)	funerary/antiquity	Hadjout	36°34′30″N 2°33′10″E	Royal Mausoleum of Mauretania (Tomb of the Christian Woman)
42-011	Mosque in the Roman plaza	religious/Islamic	Cherchell		Upload Photo
42-012	Roman ramparts and Punic cemetery	fortification, funerary/antiquity	Hadjout		Upload Photo
42-013	Château d'eau	waterwork/Antiquity	Hadjout		Upload Photo
42-014	Land between the route du Phare and the sea	nature park	Tipaza		Upload Photo
42-015	Public square	nature park	Tipaza		Upload Photo
42-016	Remains of the theatre	Antiquity/venue	Tipaza	36°35′33″N 2°26′30″E	Remains of the theatre
42-017	Remains of a basilica and a cemetery	religious/funerary/Antiquity	Tipaza	36°35′42″N 2°26′27″E	Remains of a basilica and a cemetery
42-018	Ruins of a courtroom	ruins/antiquity	Tipaza		Upload Photo
42-019	Sarcophagus and fragments from Antiquity	funerary/Antiquity	Tipaza		Sarcophagus and fragments from Antiquity
42-020	Nador farm	ruins/antiquity	Tipaza		Upload Photo
42-021	Shoreline of Tipaza	nature park	Tipaza		Upload Photo
42-022	Bérard waterfall	nature park	Tipaza		Upload Photo
42-023	Ain Ksiba	antiquity	Cherchell		Upload Photo
42-024	Kaddour property known as "Boufarik'	Archeological reserve/Antiquity	Cherchell		Upload Photo
42-025	Mosque of the hundred columns				Upload Photo
42-026	El Ghobrini Cemetery	Islamic	Cherchell		Upload Photo
42-027	Ruins of Roman theatre	Antiquity			Upload Photo
42-028	kaddour mosque known as boufarik		Tipaza		Upload Photo
42-029	Tipaza historic sites				Upload Photo

== Tissemsilt Province ==
ID	Monument	Type	Municipality	Coordinates	Image
38-001	National Parks of Ain N'Sour and Theniet el Had	Nature site	Théniet El Had		Upload Photo
38-002	Archaeological site of Ain Sfa	Stratified period	Tissemsilt		Upload Photo
38-003	Archaeological site of Ain Torkia	Stratified period	Khemisti		Upload Photo

== Tlemcen Province ==
ID	Monument	Type	Municipality	Coordinates	Image
13-001	Port of Honaïne	medieval	Honaïne	35°10′35″N 1°39′18″W	Upload Photo
13-002	Rampart of the Casbah	Fortification/medieval	Nedroma (WHS)		Upload Photo
13-003	Moorish baths	Thermal baths/medieval	Nedroma		Upload Photo
13-004	Mosque of the Gueddarines	Islamic	Nedroma		Mosque of the Gueddarines
13-005	Mosque of Sidi-Mendil	Islamic	Nedroma		Mosque of Sidi-Mendil
13-006	Grand Mosque	Islamic	Nedroma	35°00′29″N 1°44′49″W	Grand Mosque
13-007	Marabout of Sidi Brahim	Funerary/Islamic	Nedroma		Upload Photo
13-008	Mausoleum of Sidi-Bouali	Funerary/Islamic	Nedroma		Mausoleum of Sidi-Bouali
13-009	Karar Lake deposit	prehistoric	Remchi		Upload Photo
13-010	Mosque of Beni Snous	Islamic	Beni Snous		Upload Photo
13-011	Village of Tafessera	Nature Park	Azaïls		Upload Photo
13-012	Village of Tleta	Nature Park	Azaïls		Upload Photo
13-013	Village of Zahra	Nature Park	Azaïls		Upload Photo
13-014	Mosque of Khemis	Islamic	(Remchi)?		Upload Photo
13-015	Mosque of Sidi Bou Ishaq Tayar	Islamic	Tlemcen		Mosque of Sidi Bou Ishaq Tayar
13-016	Grand mosque and grounds: Minaret of the Mosque	Islamic	Tlemcen	34°53′01″N 1°18′38″E	Grand mosque and grounds: Minaret of the Mosque
13-017	Sidi-Belhassen Rachidi	Funerary/Islamic	Tlemcen		Upload Photo
13-018	Minaret of the Sidi-Hacéne mosque	Islamic	Tlemcen		Upload Photo
13-019	Sidi Boumediène Mosque and grounds: Medersas	Islamic	Tlemcen	34°53′08″N 1°19′05″W	Sidi Boumediène Mosque and grounds: Medersas
13-020	Mosque of Sidi Bellahsen	Islamic	Tlemcen	34°52′59″N 1°18′41″E	Mosque of Sidi Bellahsen
13-021	Mosque of Lala Erroyat	Islamic	Tlemcen		Upload Photo
13-022	Mosque of Sidi-Senoussi	Islamic	Tlemcen		Upload Photo
13-023	El Mechouar Mosque	Islamic	Tlemcen	34°52′52″N 1°18′41″E	El Mechouar Mosque
13-024	Mosque Bab Zir and two Marabouts of the cemetery of El Obbad Es Soufli	Islamic/Funerary	Tlemcen	34°53′11″N 1°18′24″E	Mosque Bab Zir and two Marabouts of the cemetery of El Obbad Es Soufli
13-025	Mosque of the Oulad El-Imam	Islamic	Tlemcen		Upload Photo
13-026	Ancient Mosque of Sidi-El Ghali	Islamic	Tlemcen		Upload Photo
13-027	Marabout of Sidi Brahim	Funerary/Islamic	Tlemcen		Upload Photo
13-028	Marabout of Sidi-El Wahab	Funerary/Islamic	Tlemcen		Upload Photo
13-029	Kobba said of the Khalifat cemetery of Sidi-Yakoub	Funerary/Islamic	Tlemcen		Upload Photo
13-030	Kobba of Sidi El Daoudi	Funerary/Islamic	Tlemcen		Upload Photo
13-031	Agadir (site)	medieval	Tlemcen		Upload Photo
13-032	Mansourah Mosque, minaret and dependencies	religious/medieval	Mansourah	34°52′15″N 1°20′20″W	Mansourah Mosque, minaret and dependencies
13-033	Mosque Sidi El Haloui and dependancies	religious/ medieval	Mansourah		Upload Photo
13-034	Tombs said to be of the sultana in the cemetery of Sidi Yakoub	Funerary/medieval	Mansourah		Upload Photo
13-035	Little palace of the sultans at El-Obbad in El Fouqui	Residence/ medieval	Mansourah		Upload Photo
13-036	Store and historic monument agency	Historic collections/Medieval	Mansourah		Upload Photo
13-037	Walls of Mansourah and ruins of the Macalla	Fortification/medieval	Mansourah	34°52′15″N 1°20′21″W	Walls of Mansourah and ruins of the Macalla
13-038	Gate of Mansourah		Mansourah	34°52′15″N 1°20′20″W	Gate of Mansourah
13-039	fragments from the Arab period in the city hall museum	Medieval	Mansourah		Upload Photo
13-040	Columns from the mosque of Mansourah	Architectural elements/medieval	Mansourah		Upload Photo
13-041	Tower and ruins of the gate of Sidi El Daoudi on the east face	surveillance/ruins/medieval	Mansourah		Upload Photo
13-042	Bab el Khemis gate	access/medieval	Tlemcen		Upload Photo
13-043	Ruins of the Tlemcen ramparts	ruins	Mansourah		Upload Photo
13-044	Bordjs and other works on the south and west faces	Fortification/medieval	Mansourah		Upload Photo
13-045	Gate of Bab El Kermadine on the northwest face improperly called "Bab El Toi"	access/Medieval	Tlemcen		Upload Photo
13-046	Minaret of Agadir	religious/medieval	Tlemcen	34°53′21″N 1°18′00″E	Minaret of Agadir
13-047	Kobba of Sidi Abdallah Ben Mansour and of Sidi Ben Ali at Ain El Hout	Funerary/medieval	Tlemcen		Upload Photo
13-048	Ruins of Arab ramparts	ruins	Tlemcen		Upload Photo

== Tizi Ouzou Province ==
ID	Monument	Type	Municipality	Coordinates	Image
15-001	Roman ruins known as "El Habs El Ksour"	ruins/antiquity	Azzefoun		Upload Photo
15-002	Roman mausoleum of Teksebt	funerary/antiquity	Iflissen		Upload Photo
15-003	Ruined Roman temples and basilicas	ruins/religious/antiquity	Tigzirt (Iomnium)		Upload Photo

== See also ==
- List of heritage registers
- Liste de forts, fortifications, citadelles et places fortes en Afrique
