= Lalla Ruya Mosque =

Mosque in Tlemcen, Algeria

- مسجد لالة الروية
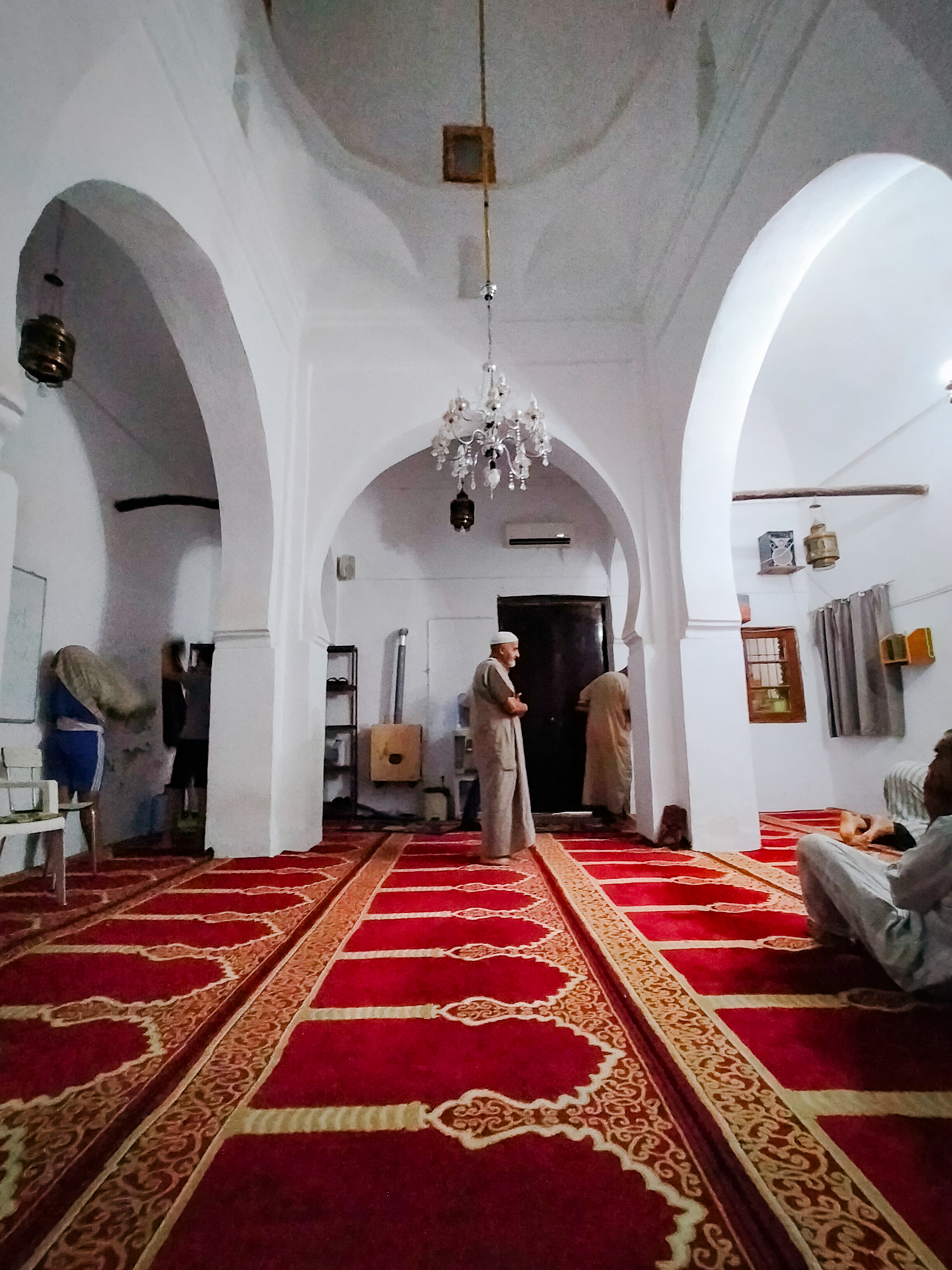
- Inside the mosque

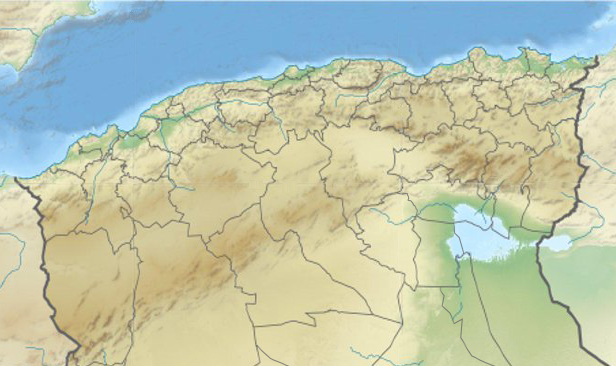
- Location of the mosque in northern Algeria

Religion
- Affiliation: Islam
- Ecclesiastical or organizational status: Mosque
- Status: Active

Location
- Location: Tlemcen
- Country: Algeria
- Interactive map of Lalla Ruya Mosque
- Coordinates: 34°53′2″N 1°18′25″W

Architecture
- Type: Islamic architecture
- Minaret: 1

The Lalla Ruya Mosque (Arabic: مسجد لالة الروية; French: Mosquée de Lalla Rouya), also known as the Lalla al-Ruya Mosque, is a modest mosque situated in the Quarter of the Archers (Harat al-Rumah) within the Almohad neighborhood of Tlemcen, Algeria. It is home to the tomb, or a nearby site, of the revered saintly woman, Lalla Ruya, known in local tradition for her healing powers.

The mosque was listed as a cultural heritage monument of Algeria.

== Gallery ==
Floor plan of the mosque

== See also ==
- Islam in Algeria
- List of mosques in Algeria
- List of cultural assets of Algeria in Tlemcen Province
