= Tebessa (disambiguation) =

Tébessa is the capital city of Tébessa Province, in the Shawi region of Algeria.

Tebessa may also refer to:

- Tebessa Province, a province (wilaya) of Algeria
- Tebessa District, an administrative district located in Tebessa Province
- US Tébessa, a football club based in Tébessa

== See also ==
- Maximilian of Tebessa, Christian saint and martyr
