= El Rahman Mosque =

Mosque in Cherchell, Algeria

Er-Rahman Mosque
- مسجد الرحمن
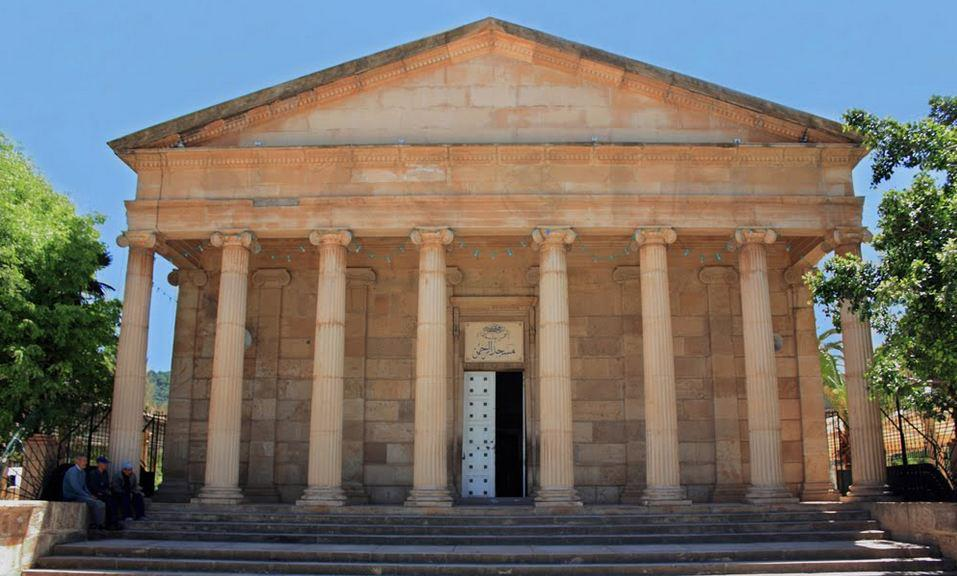
- The Neo-classical mosque facade in 2013

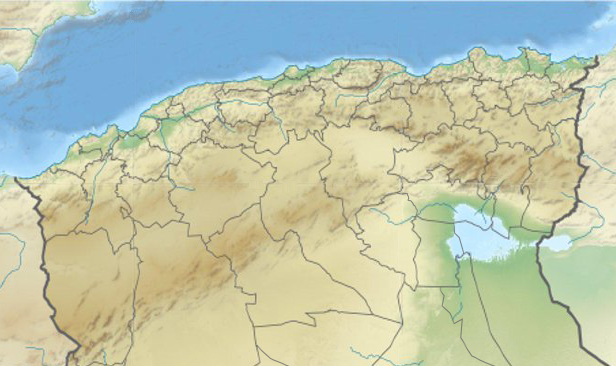
- Location of the mosque in north Algeria

Religion
- Affiliation: Islam
- Ecclesiastical or organizational status: Church (19th century–1964); Mosque (since c. 1964)
- Status: Active

Location
- Location: Cherchell, Tipaza Province
- Country: Algeria
- Interactive map of Er-Rahman Mosque
- Coordinates: 36°36′27″N 2°11′16″E

Architecture
- Type: Church
- Style: Neo-classical
- Completed: 19th century (as a church); c. 1964 (as a mosque)

The Er-Rahman Mosque (Arabic: مسجد الرحمن, lit. 'Mosque of A Hundred Columns') is a mosque located in Cherchell, in the province of Tipaza, in Algeria.

Built during the French colonial period at the end of the 19th-century as a church called the Church of Saint-Paul (French: Église Saint-Paul de Cherchell), dedicated in honour of Paul the Apostle, the Neo-classical church was converted into a mosque in 1964, after the country's independence.

== See also ==
- Islam in Algeria
- List of mosques in Algeria
- List of cultural assets of Algeria
