= Adjel Adjoul =

Algerian military leader (1922-1993)

Adjel Adjoul (Arabic: عاجل عجول), 1993-1922, is one of the leaders of the Wilaya I during the Algerian War.

== Early life ==
Adjoul, was born in 1922 in the village of Kimmel and had five brothers and four sisters. His father was considered one of the richest in his area, having only ever attended Koranic school. It was in 1951 that he began to take an interest in politics, following a visit to the village by a regional propagandist for the MTLD After addressing the fellahs, he proposed that Adjoul be Messali's representative.

== Algerian War ==
Following the capture of Mostefa Ben Boulaïd, he became the assistant of Bachir Chihani and General Supervisor of the Aurès region, leading fierce battles. His name is linked to the major decisions, notably the creation of the propaganda newspaper (Free Algeria), the annexation of Nememcha region and the incitement of the North Constantinois to revolt. He took part in the Battle of El-Djorf, He survived an assassination attempt; hunted and wounded, he surrender on 1, November, 1956 to the French army.
