= Djamaa el Djedid =

Mosque in Algiers, Algeria

Djamaʽa al-Djedid
- الجامع الجديد
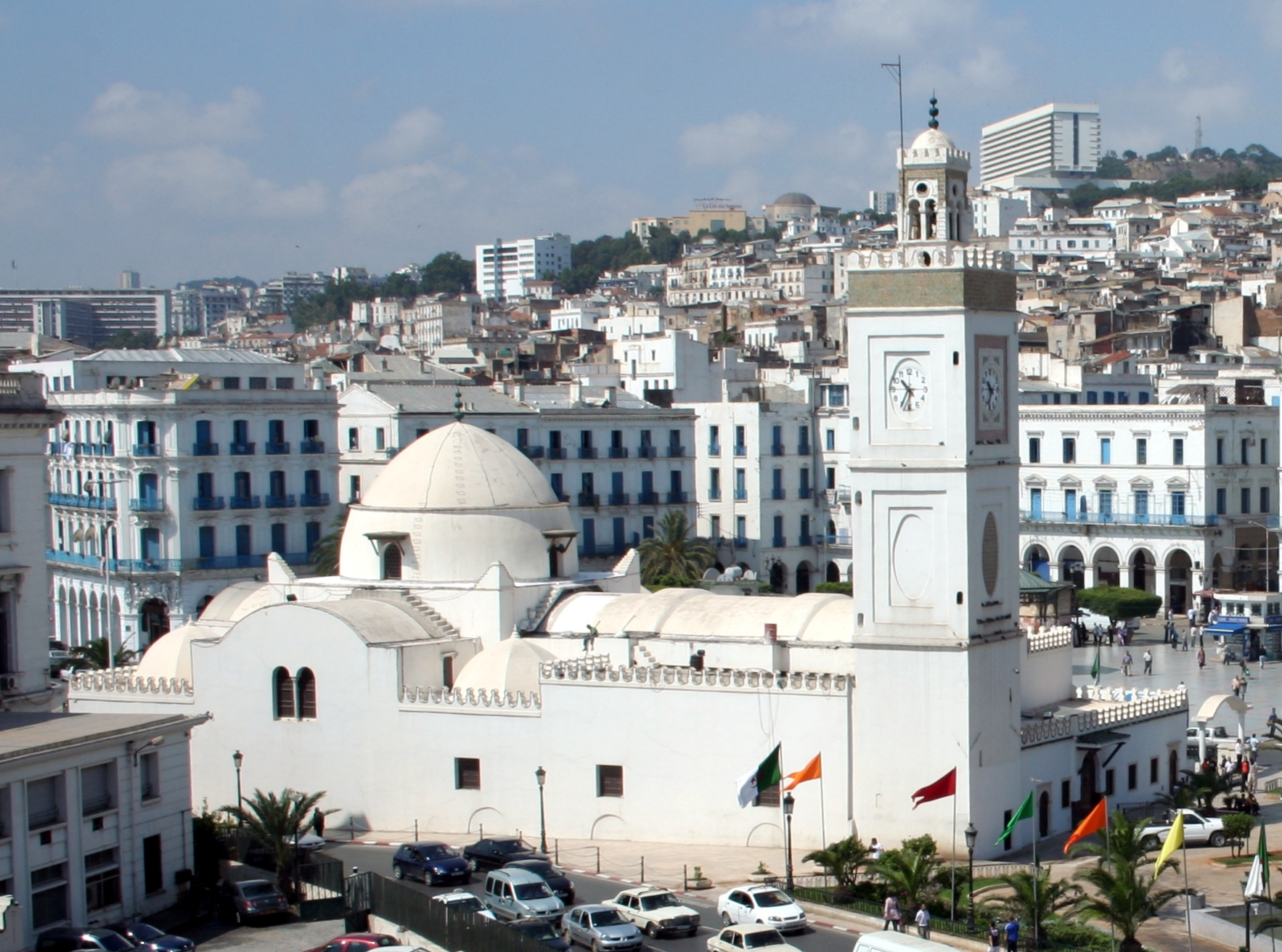

- Location of the mosque in Algiers

Religion
- Affiliation: Islam
- Ecclesiastical or organisational status: Mosque
- Status: Active

Location
- Location: Algiers
- Country: Algeria
- Interactive map of Djamaʽa al-Djedid

Architecture
- Type: Islamic architecture
- Style: Ottoman; North African; European
- Completed: 1660 CE

Specifications
- Dome: 1
- Dome height (outer): 24 m (79 ft)
- Minaret: 1
- Minaret height: 30 m (98 ft) (Note: Due to the rising street level, the minaret stands at 25 m (82 ft) above the street level.)
- Materials: Stone; Italian marble

The Djamaʽa el Djedid (Arabic: الجامع الجديد, romanized: Jamaa El Jedid, lit. 'New Mosque'), also rendered Djamaa al-Djedid, is a mosque in Algiers, the capital of Algeria.

== History ==
The mosque was completed in 1070 AH (1659/1660 CE) according to an inscription over its main entrance portal. That inscription also attributes its construction to al-Hajj Habib, a Janissary governor of the Algiers region appointed by the Ottoman imperial administration in Constantinople.

During the French colonial rule, the mosque was called the Mosque of the Fisherman's Wharf (French: Mosquée de la Pêcherie; Mesdjed el-Haoutin).

Mohamed Charef served as imam from 1962 until his death, aged 103, in 2011.

== Architecture ==
The central dome reaches a height of 24 metres (79 ft) and rests on four pillars via a drum and four pendentives. These four corners are enclosed by four octagonal cupolas. Between these square spaces, barrel vaults cover three sides whilst the fourth area, facing the qibla wall, is covered by a fourth vault with three bays, flanked on both sides by an aisle.

Ottoman patronage directed the structure in terms of both the layout and the decoration. The building is unique in its mixture of multiple architectural traditions, including elements from Andalusian and southern Italian religious architecture, influential in Algeria at the time. Carvings in the mosque's interior reveal Italian influences while the mihrab's arch follows Andalusian models. The use of Italian marble instead of wood for the minbar reflects Ottoman traditions, though the components are all typical of North African minbars.

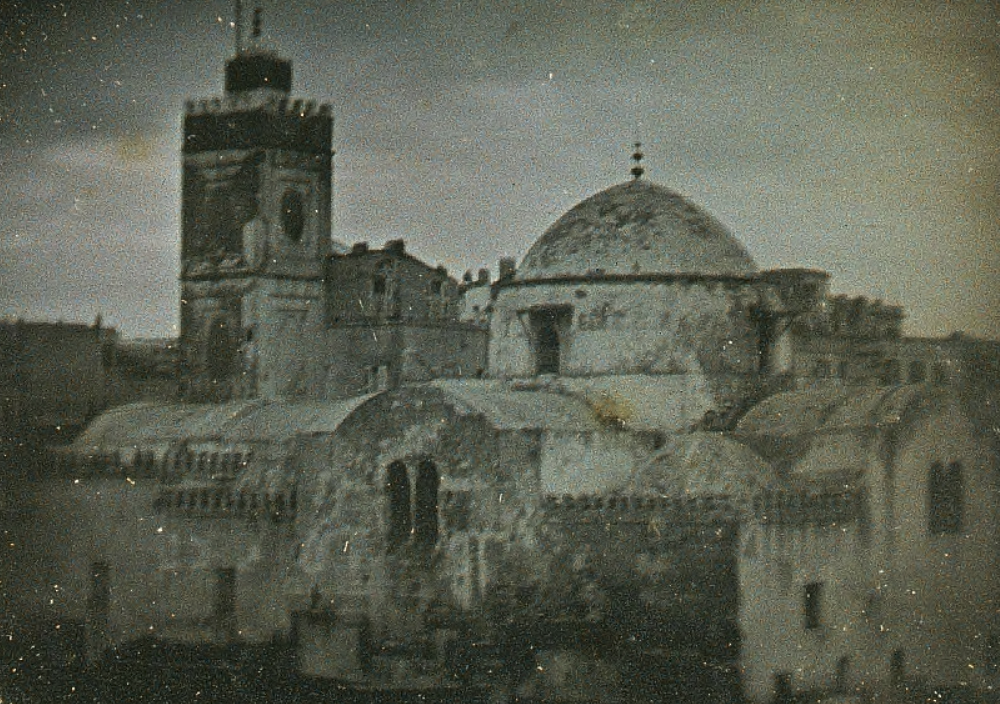
The mosque, c. 1840

The mosque forms the eastern edge of the Place des Martyrs. The qibla wall serves busy Amilcar Cabral Boulevard. The Almoravid Great Mosque of Algiers (built c. 1097 CE) also gives on the same boulevard, 70 metres (230 ft) to the east. The mosque got its informal name from its proximity to the fishing harbour, and attendance by the local fishermen. The mosque measures 27 metres (89 ft) wide and 48 metres (157 ft) long with the qibla wall forming the southern edge of the building.

The stone structure of the mosque is completely whitewashed on its exterior, including the domes, resulting in a unified white appearance. One of the only hints of colour on the exterior is the thin line of tile trimming the decorative rampart on the mosque's walls facing the Place des Martyrs. Though most of the mosque reveals a clear Ottoman influence, the minaret is based almost entirely on traditional North African square models. Initially 30 metres (98 ft) high, today it's only 25 metres (82 ft) above the level of the street, due to the gradually rising street level. The clock, that was integrated into the minaret by French architect Bournichon, was originally part of the Palais Jenina.

== See also ==
- Islam in Algeria
- List of mosques in Algeria
- List of cultural assets of Algeria
