= Hassan Pasha Mosque =

Mosque in Oran, Algeria

- مسجد حسن الباشا
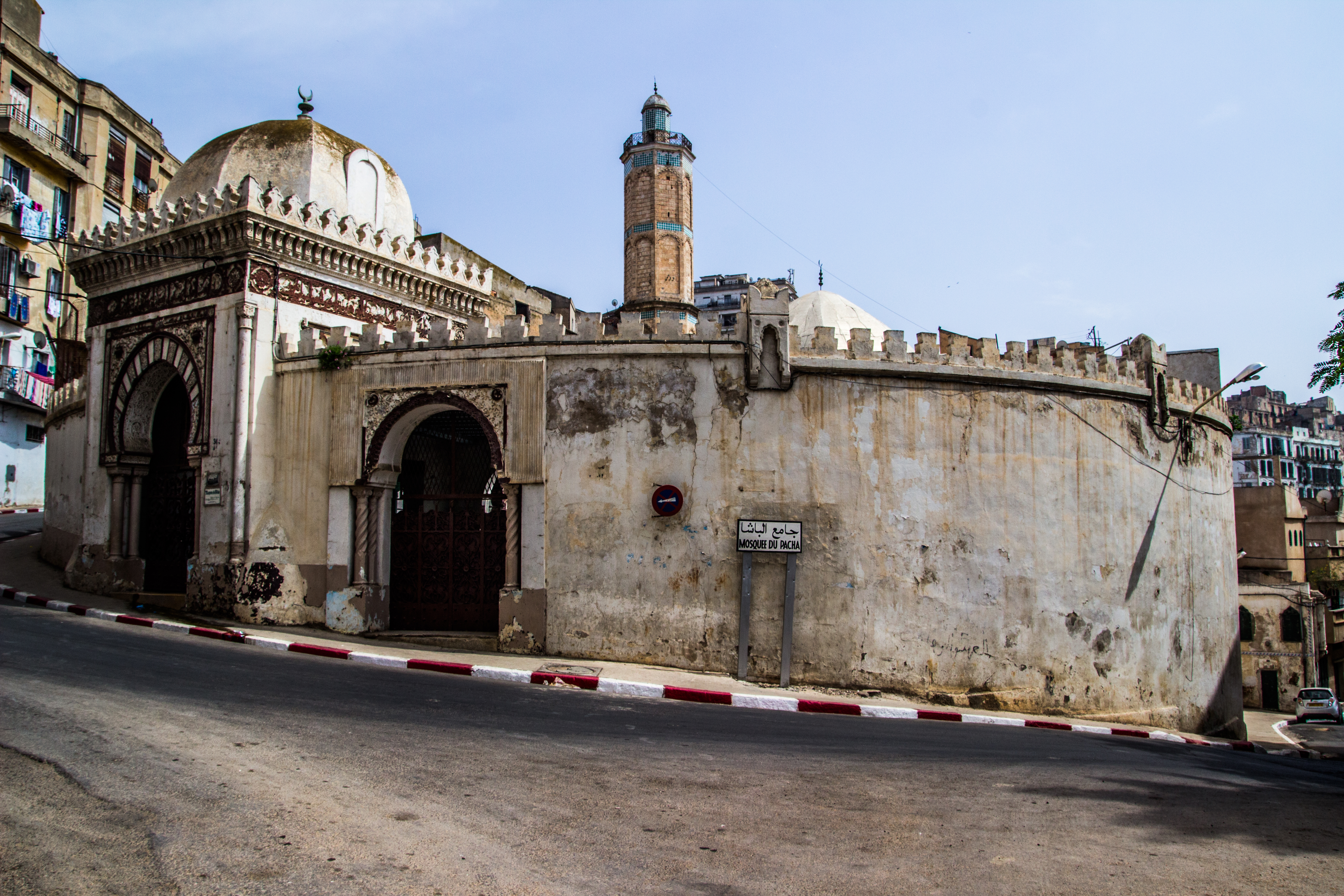
- The mosque in 2013

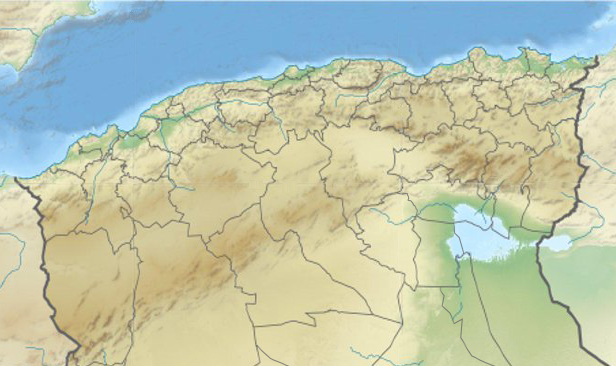
- Location of the mosque in northern Algeria

Religion
- Affiliation: Islam
- Ecclesiastical or organizational status: Mosque (1796–1830); (since 1835)
- Status: Closed (since 2010)

Location
- Location: Oran
- Country: Algeria
- Interactive map of Hassan Pasha Mosque
- Coordinates: 35°42′16″N 0°39′17″W

Architecture
- Type: Islamic architecture
- Founder: Baba Hassan
- Completed: 1796

Specifications
- Dome: 2
- Dome dia. (outer): 12 m (39 ft)
- Minaret: 1

The Hassan Pasha Mosque (Arabic: مسجد حسن الباشا, romanized: Masjid Hassan el-Basha), also referred to as the Pasha Mosque or the Oran Grand Mosque, is a mosque located in Oran, Algeria.

== Overview ==
The mosque was built in 1796 by order of Baba Hassan, Pasha of Algiers, in memory of the expulsion of the Spanish. During the Invasion of Algiers in 1830, French soldiers occupied the mosque and it was used as their living-quarters. In 1835, after the French invasion, the building was restored as a mosque and renovated during the 1860s. In 1952, the mosque was listed as a historic monument; and in 2010, the mosque-monument was closed to the public.

== Gallery ==
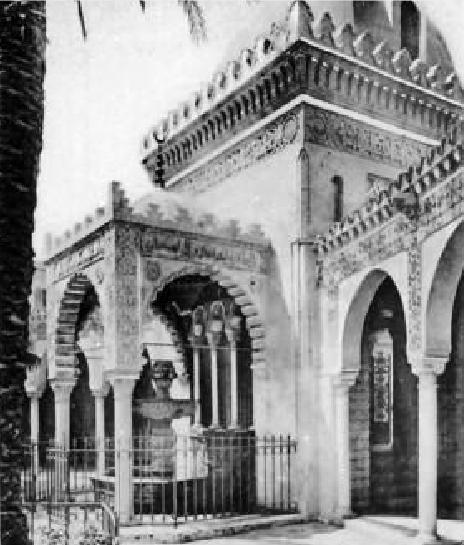
Ablutions fountain at the mosque

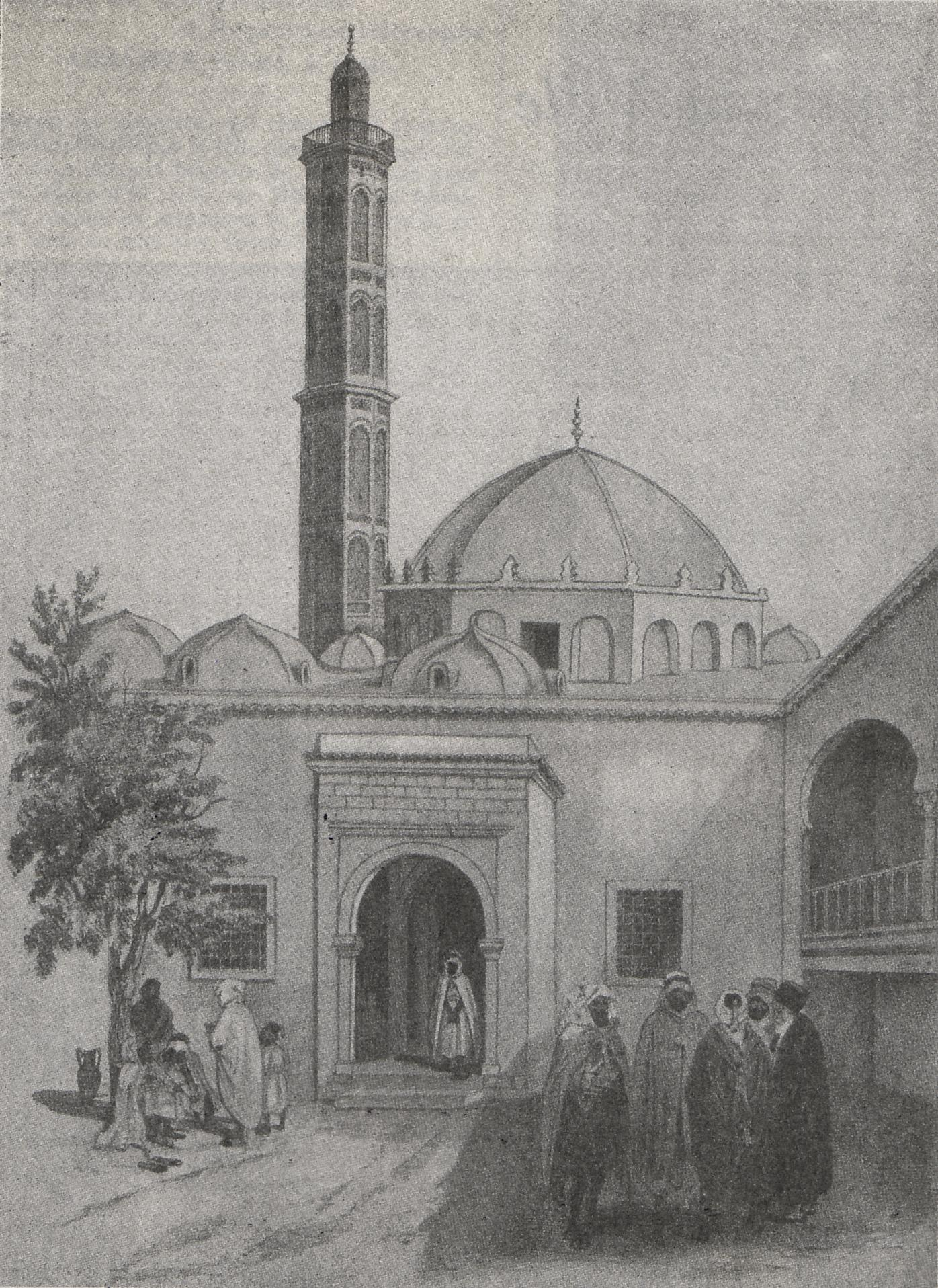
A view of the minaret and the dome

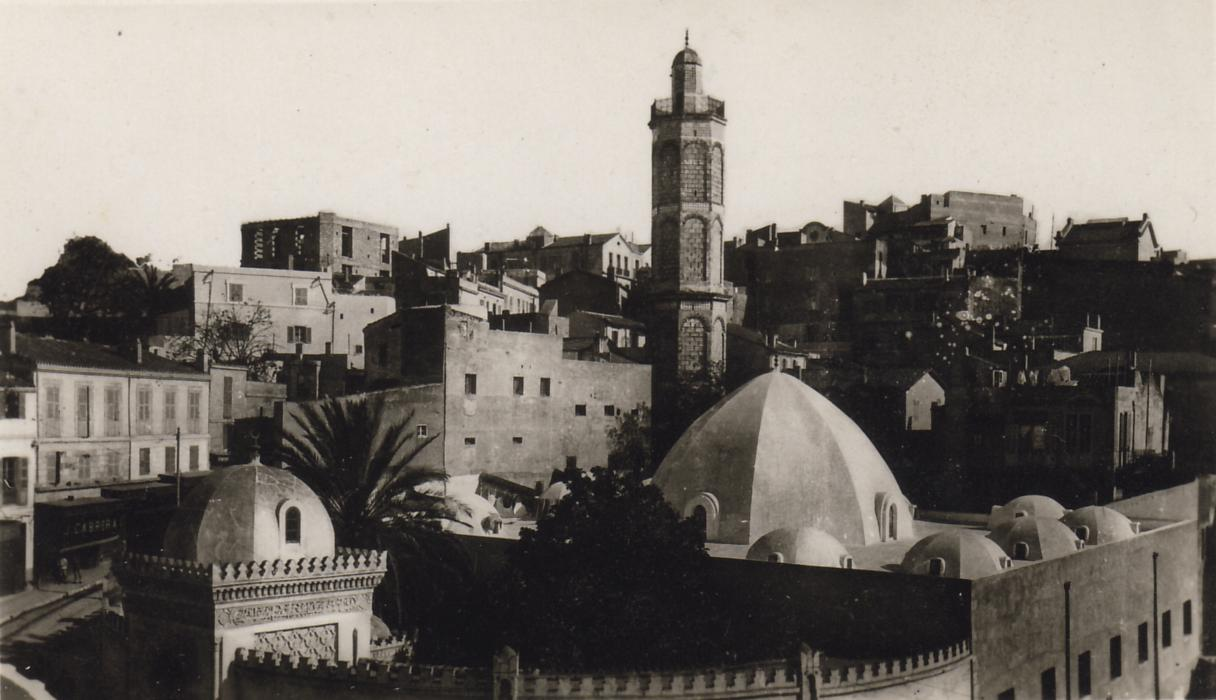
The mosque in 1920

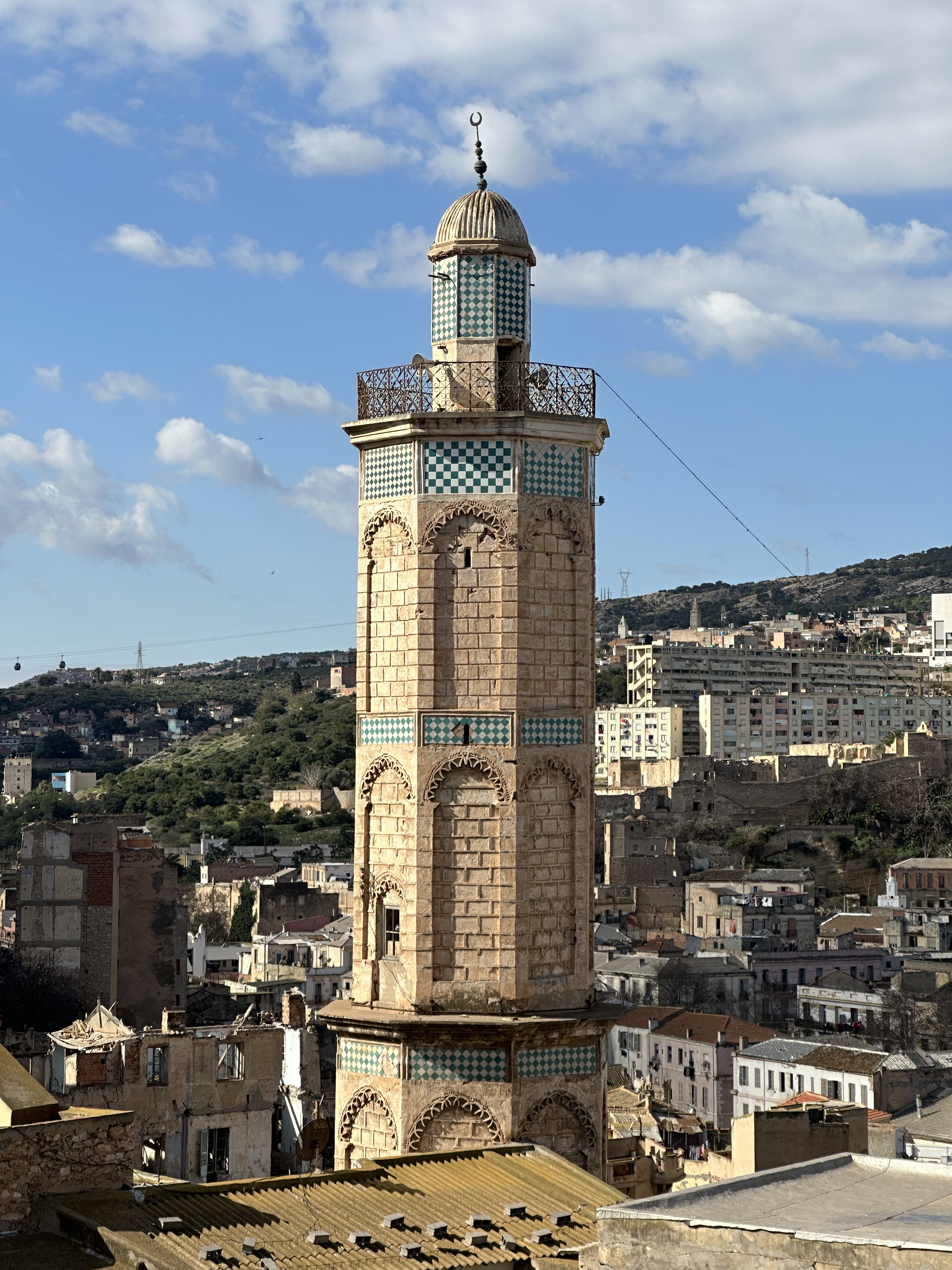
Close-up of the minaret

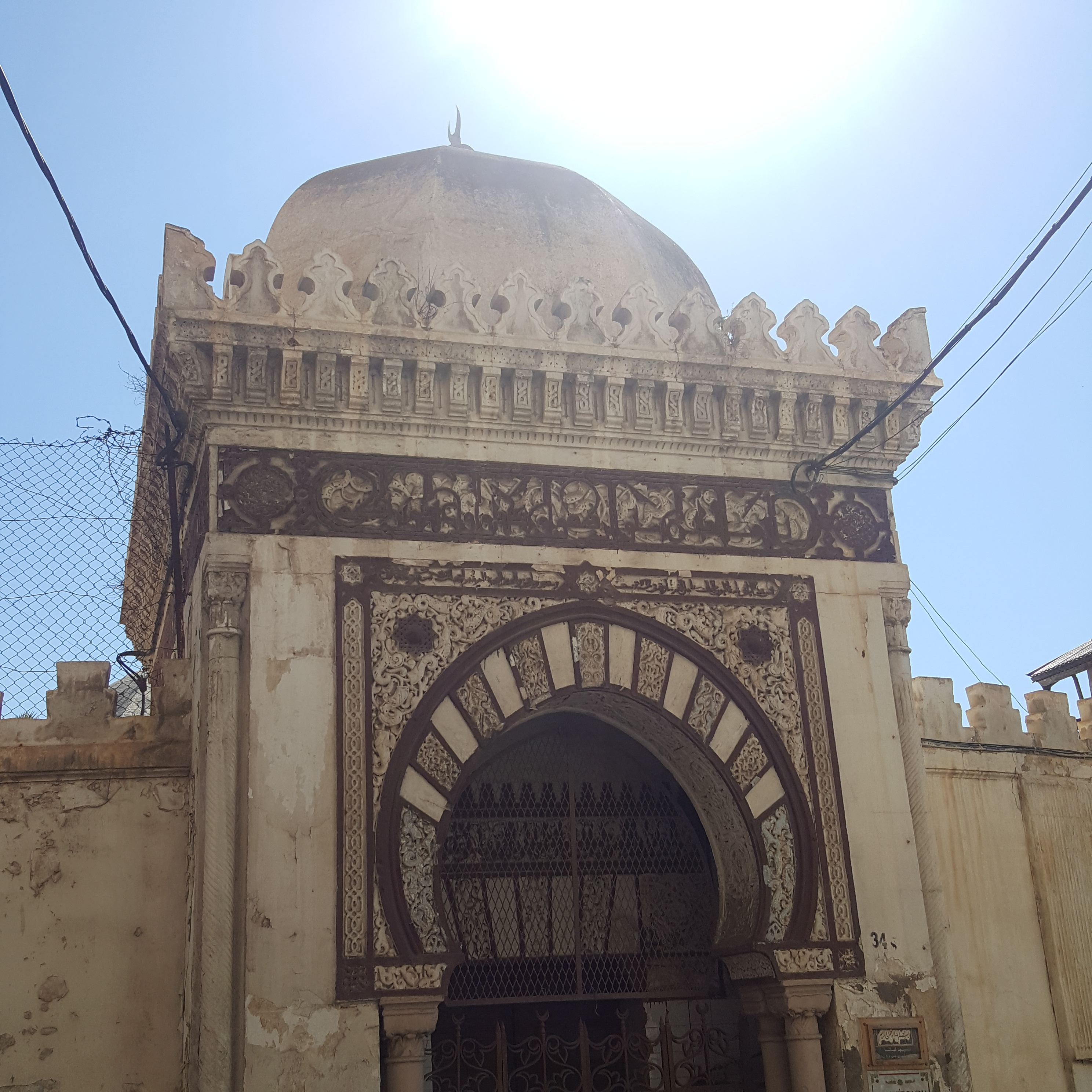
Front entrance to the mosque

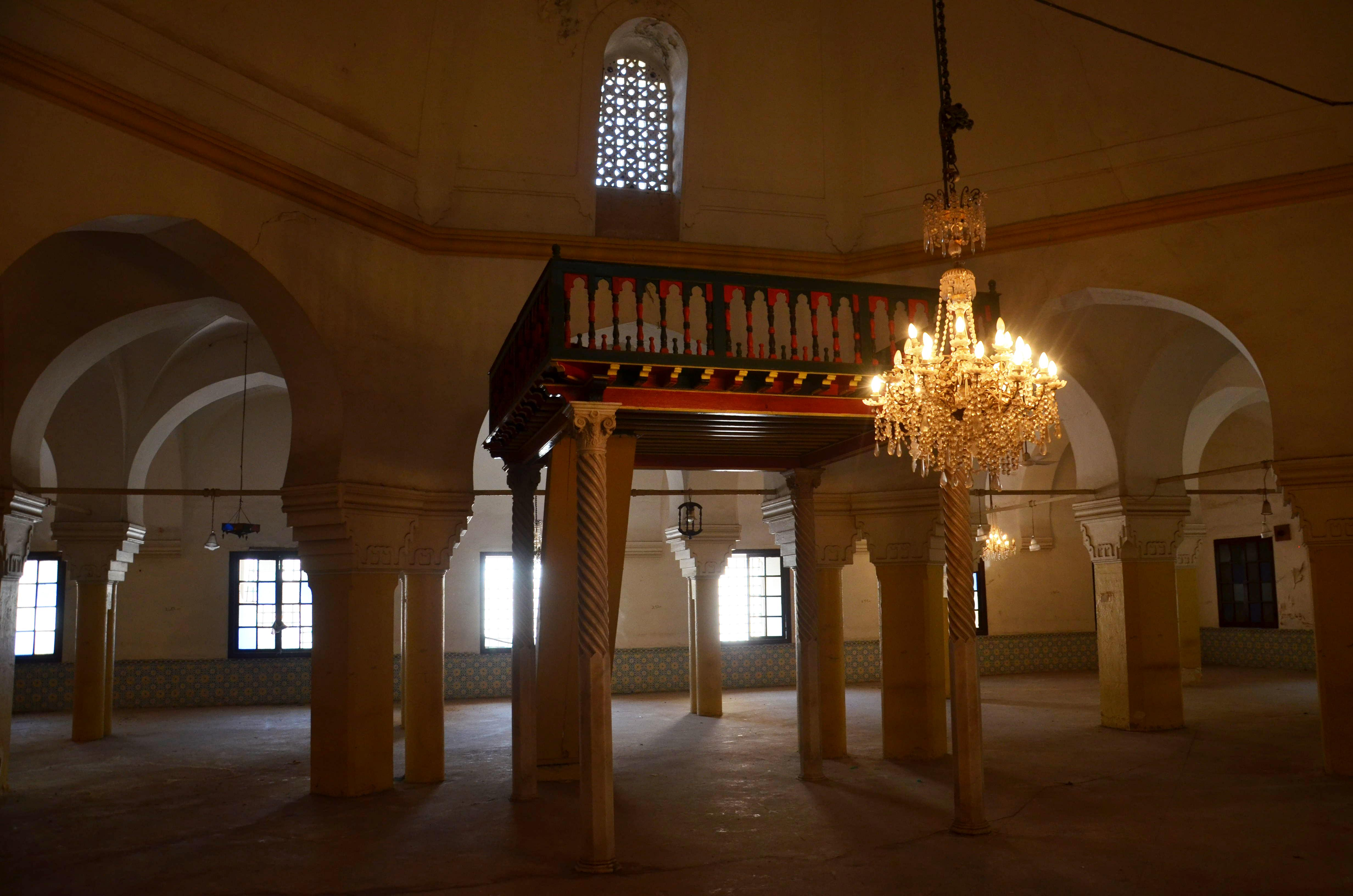
Interior of the mosque

== See also ==
- Islam in Algeria
- List of mosques in Algeria
- List of cultural assets of Algeria
