= First Battle of El Djorf =

Battle in the French-Algerian War

- Part of the Algerian War
Date	20–28 September 1955
Location	Nemencha mountains, near Tébessa, Algeria
Result	FLN victory: FLN leadership escapes French attack; FLN broke the siege

Belligerents
French Republic	FLN

Commanders and leaders
André Beaufre; Michel Garcet †; Lieutenant Julien †; Major Miguel †; Lieutenant Lafargue †; Lieutenant Moreau †; Aspirant Dufour †	Bachir Chihani; Lazhar Cheriet; Laghrour Abbes; Adjel Adjoul (WIA)

Units involved
40,000	300

Casualties and losses
Few (French claim); 400–800 killed 1,500 wounded (Algerian claim)	45 killed 40 wounded and captured (French claim); 60–70 killed 60–90 wounded (Algerian claim)

The First Battle of El Djorf (or El-Djorf, also known as Djeurf in French) took place on 22 September 1955, during the Algerian War, between the National Liberation Army and the French Army.

== Background ==
The battle occurred a year after the start of the Algerian War. It took place in the Aurès, the mountainous terrain where the war started. The French military had arrested Mostefa Ben Boulaïd, who was the head of the Algerian National Liberation Army in that region.

An internal conflict in the ALN resulted in Colonel Bachir Chihani being named head of the Willaya I. He started by gathering the troops that had dispersed over the region, and managed to organize a meeting in the region of El Djorf, north of current Tebessa Province. This meeting was aimed at reorganising the troops to relaunch military activities. 300 fighters attended this meeting.

The French army launched Operation "Timgad" and had no idea that it was about to fall on the meeting of the chiefs of Aurès and Nementchas that Bachir Chihani had organised between 18 and 23 September 1955.

== Battle ==
As part of Operation Timgad, French troops entered the Nementchas mountains, where the FLN meeting was taking place. Strong of about 25,000 men, the French forces in the area consisted mainly in Algerian and Tunisian Tirailleurs, but also comprised some elite elements of the French Foreign Legion and the French paratroopers.

Now threatened with encirclement, FLN fighters skirmished with the French for a few days, making good use of the rugged mountainous terrain and of the many caves of the region to evade French forces despite their numerical advantage. On the fourth night however, the FLN leaders realized that their small contingent couldn't keep up against so many opponents.

Abbes Laghrour and Adjel Adjoul urged Bachir Chihani to order the retreat, but as he kept refusing, they eventually decided to leave anyway. Adjoul took most of the men to the south and, under the cover of the night, they managed to cross the French lines near the Oued Helaïl, at the price of some casualties. Meanwhile, Laghrour escaped with 30 men through the eastern side of the encirclement. Chihani remained in the cave where they had been hiding, and after the entrance was blown up with dynamite by the French army, he spent six days hidden under the rubble before successfully escaping at night.

Inside the cave that had served as headquarters for the local FLN fighters, the French found important documents, including strategic instructions from Ahmed Ben Bella in person.

The FLN casualties were of 45 killed and 40 wounded and captured, while French losses were very light according to the French army's reports.

According to Algerian sources, the battle was a resounding FLN victory, with losses of the French army were as follows: between 400 and 800 dead and more than 1,500 wounded. As well as the loss of large amounts of ammunition 44, the loss of 100 soldiers, the downing of eight aircraft and the destruction of three armored vehicles. 45 and about 150 pieces of weapons such as automatic rifles (50 guns) and others . As for the losses of the National Liberation Army, estimates varied, and in general, they range between 60 and 70 dead and 60-90 Wounded, and 15 weapons lost, it was not possible to keep them on the night of going out while on a mule convoy. The FLN leadership ambushed by the French managed to escape, almost miraculously, certain death and encirclement by the superior French army.

== Aftermath ==
Although the FLN technically fled and left the battlefield to the French, the First Battle of El Djorf is in the present day seen as a great victory in Algeria due to the fact FLN fighters miraculously managed to escape with only some casualties despite being vastly outnumbered.

At the time, however, it was seen much differently. The FLN leaders blamed Bachir Chihani for his recklessness in organising a rally as important as the one in El-Djorf, neglecting the basic rules of security, and call for self-criticism on his part, which did not come.

On 23 October 1955, Bachir Chihani was executed by his subordinates Abbes Laghrour and Adjel Adjoul for his poor leadership in El-Djorf.

British historian Alistair Horne describes the whole affair as a serious failure for the FLN and states that the documents found by the French in Chihani's headquarters gave French intelligence "its first clear view of the overall structure of the FLN".

In the context of the war of memories with the former colonial power, the Algerian authorities decided to make the Battle of El Djorf, which took place from 20 to 28 September 1955 in the Nemenchas Mountains in eastern Algeria, a place of memory for the Algerian nation in the 2000s.

== Bibliography ==
- Mohamed Larbi Medaci (2001). Les Tamiseurs de sables. Algiers: Anep. pp. 251 pages. ISBN 9961903714.
