= Ahmed Zabana National Museum =

Museum in Oran, Algeria

Coordinates: 35°41′45″N 0°38′43″W

Ahmed Zabana National Museum المتحف الوطني أحمد زبانة
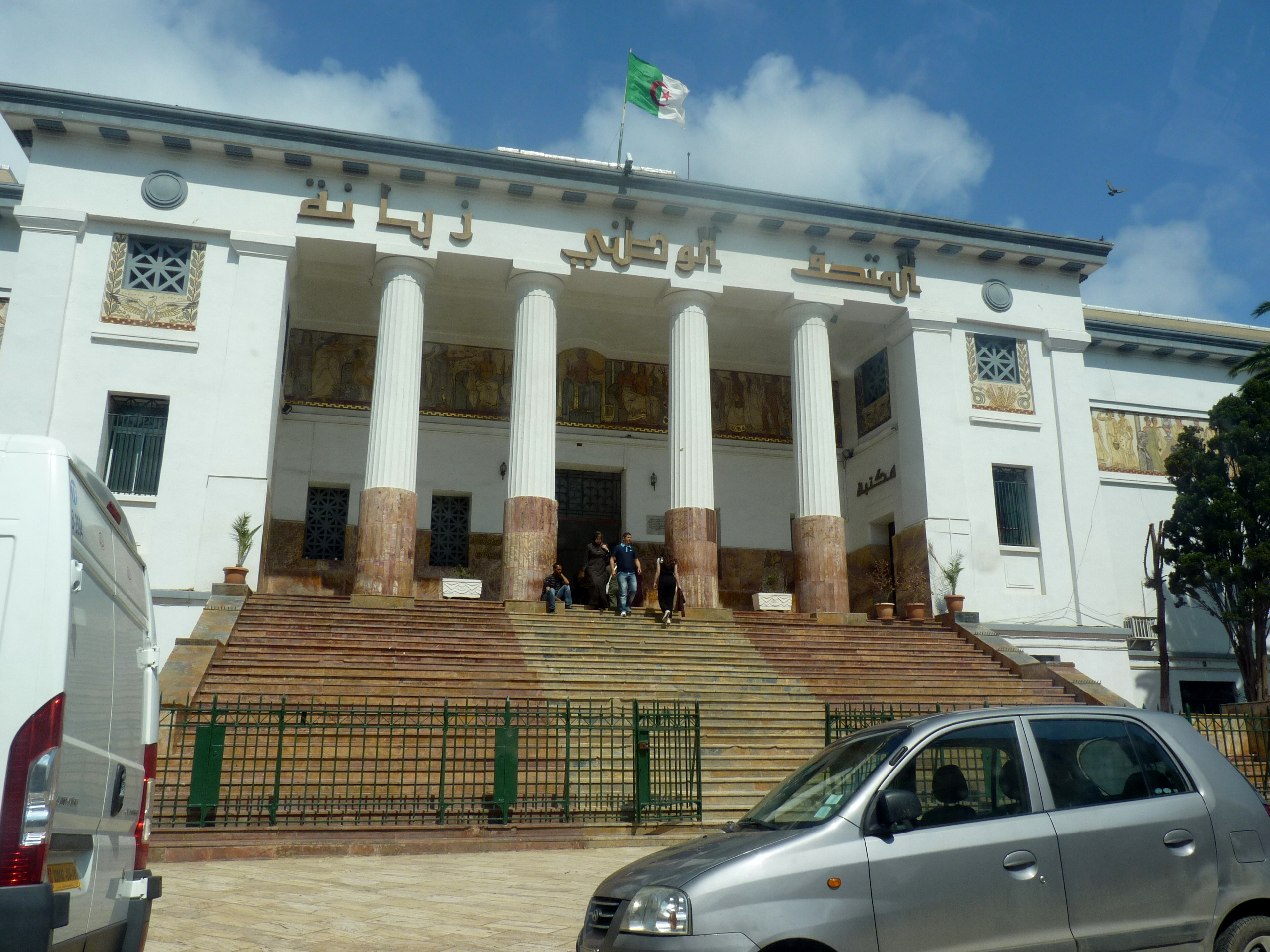
- Ahmed Zabana National Museum of Oran
- Location: Oran, Algeria

The Ahmed Zabana National Museum (Arabic: المتحف الوطني أحمد زبانة, El-mathaf El-ouatani Ahmed Zabana) is a museum located in Oran, Algeria, and named after the Algerian national hero Ahmed Zabana who was executed by the French on May 19, 1956, in Algiers.

== Collections ==
The first floor of the museum tells the story of the local impact of Algeria's battle for independence from France including a list of local people executed by the French between 1954 and 1962. The museum also includes artwork in the form of ancient sculptures, some mosaics and terracotta portraits and paintings including works by 20th-century Algerian artists and French Orientalists including Eugene Fromentin.

== See also ==
- Algerian War
- List of cultural assets of Algeria
