= Bab Zir Mosque =

Mosque in Tlemcen, Algeria

- مسجد باب زير
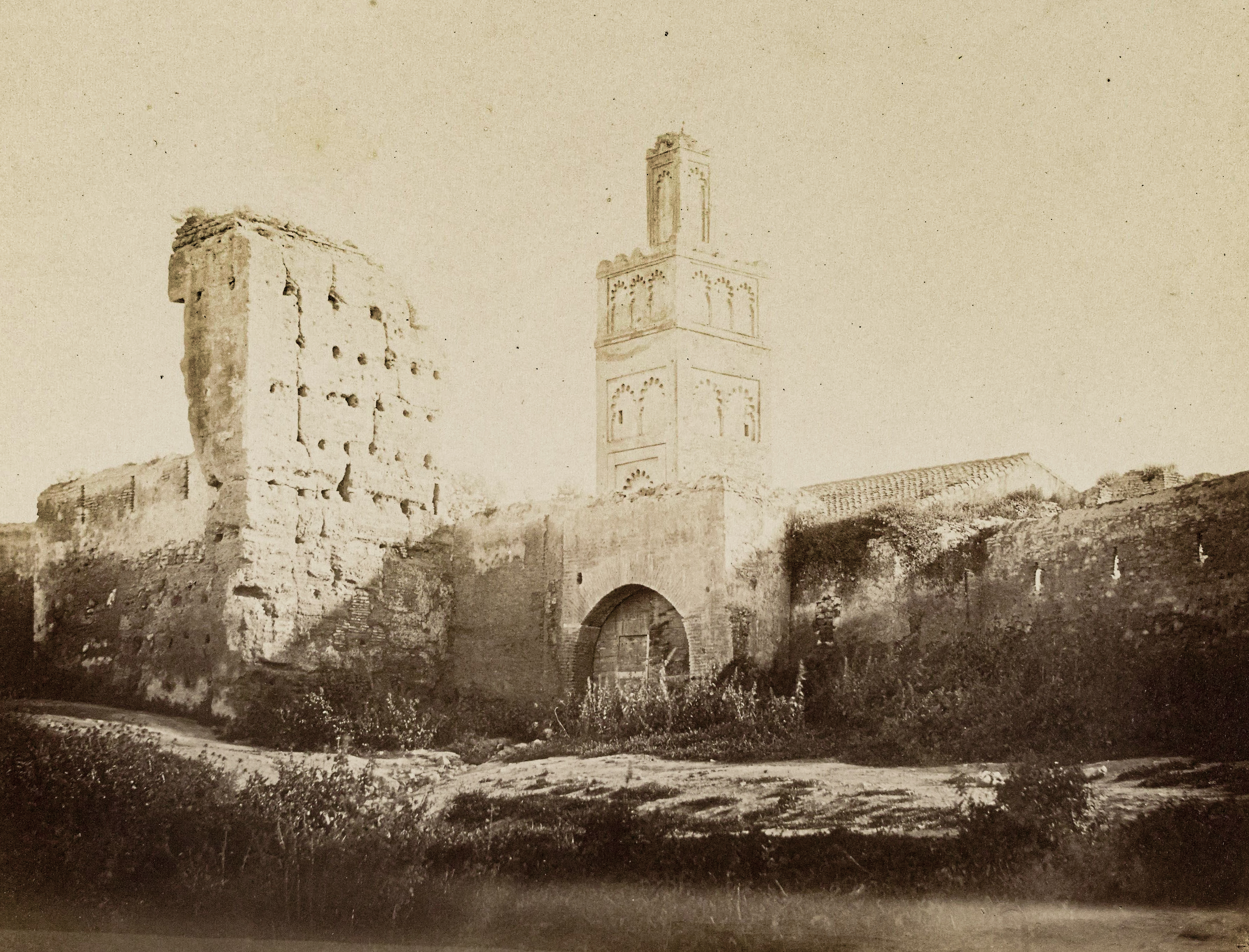
- The mosque's minaret, c. 1857

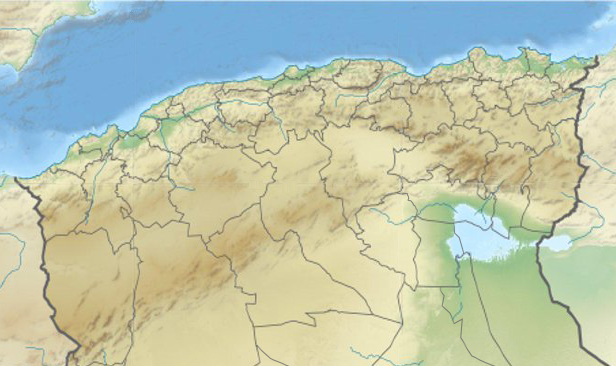
- Location of the mosque in northern Algeria

Religion
- Affiliation: Islam
- Ecclesiastical or organizational status: Mosque
- Status: Active

Location
- Location: Tlemcen
- Country: Algeria
- Interactive map of Bab Zir Mosque
- Coordinates: 34°53′11″N 1°18′24″W

Architecture
- Type: Islamic architecture
- Minaret: 1

Website
- agadirmosque.com

The Bab Zir Mosque (Arabic: مسجد باب زير) is a modest neighborhood mosque. situated in the Bab Zir district of the medina of Tlemcen, Algeria. The district takes its name from a historic city gate that once stood in the area but no longer exists.

== Gallery ==
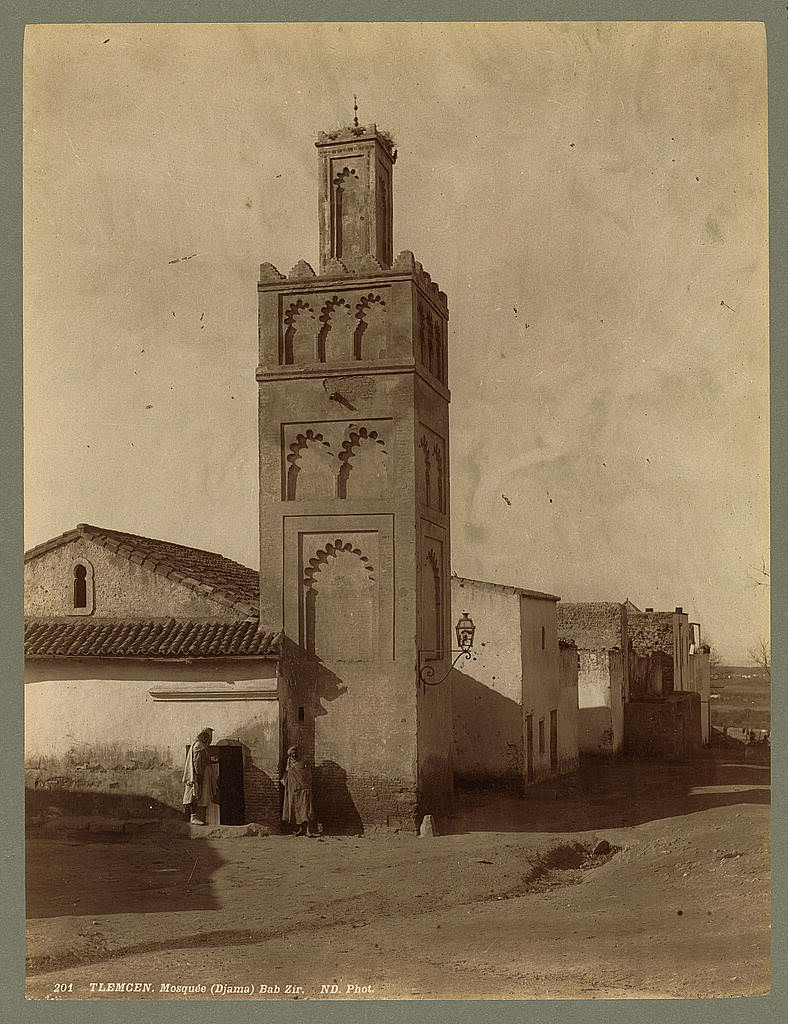
An image of the minaret, in 1860

== See also ==
- Islam in Algeria
- List of mosques in Algeria
- List of cultural assets of Algeria in Tlemcen Province
