= Amentane =

Village in Batna, Algeria

Coordinates: 35°07′23″N 5°56′17″E

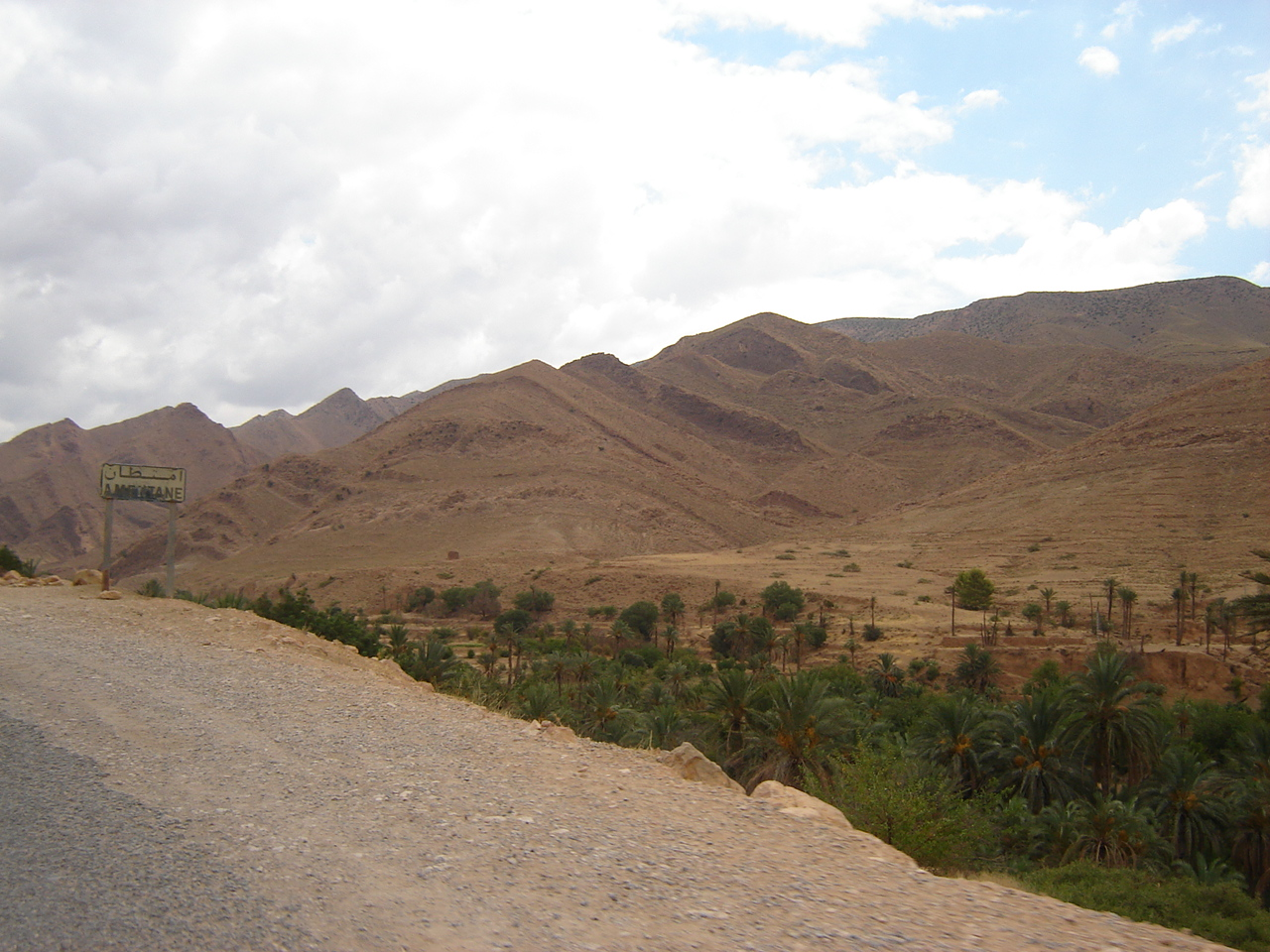
Southern approach to Amentane

Amentane (Arabic: أمنطان) is a small village in Algeria, in the wilaya of Batna.
