= Sidi Kada =

- Commune and town
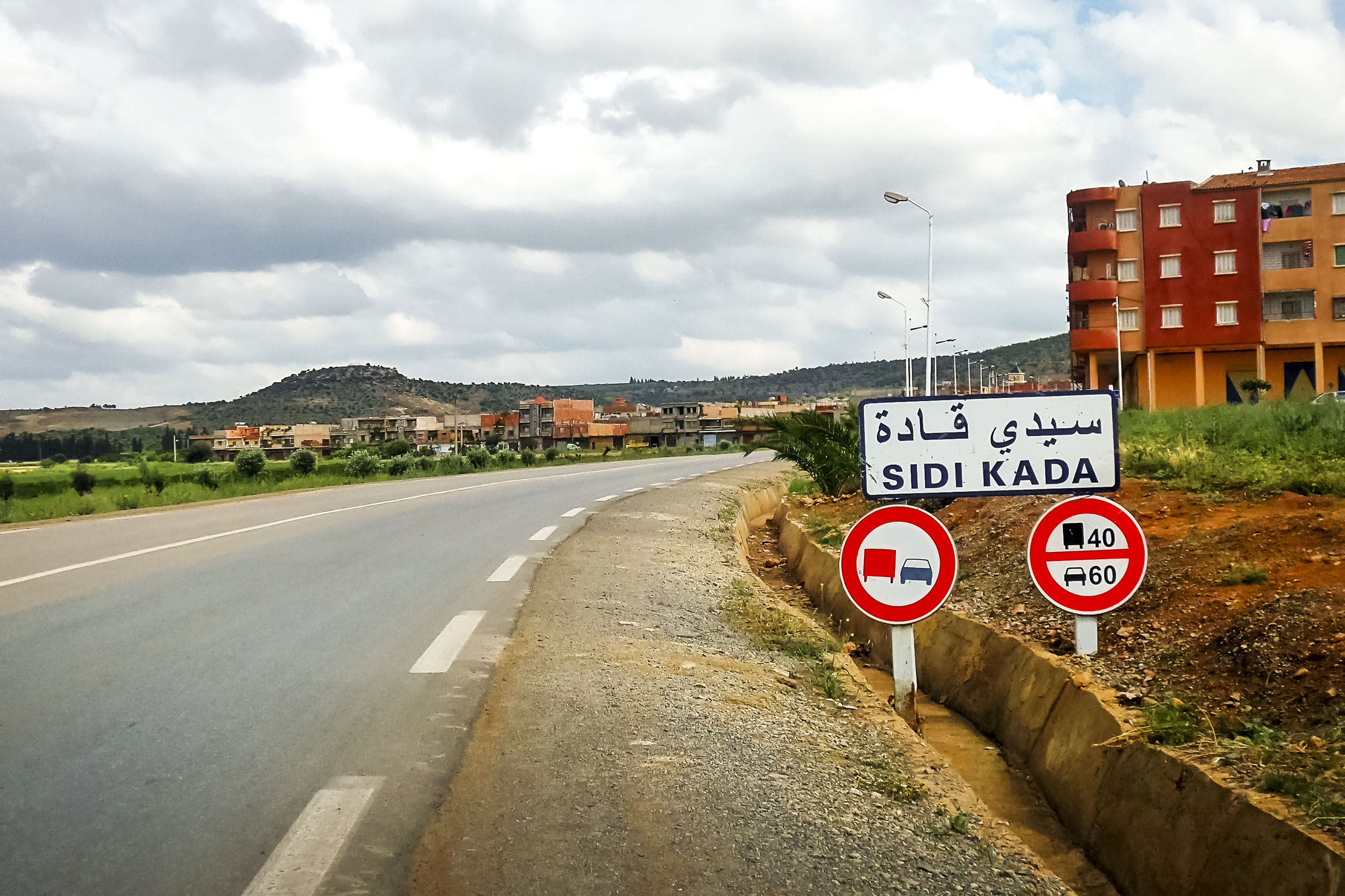

- Location within Algeria
- Country: Algeria
- Province: Mascara Province

Population (1998)
  - Total: 17,843
- Time zone: UTC+1 (CET)

Sidi Kada is a town and commune in Mascara Province, Algeria. According to the 1998 census it has a population of 17,843.
