= Tlatet Eddouair =

Coordinates: 35°58′51″N 2°57′48″E

- Commune and town
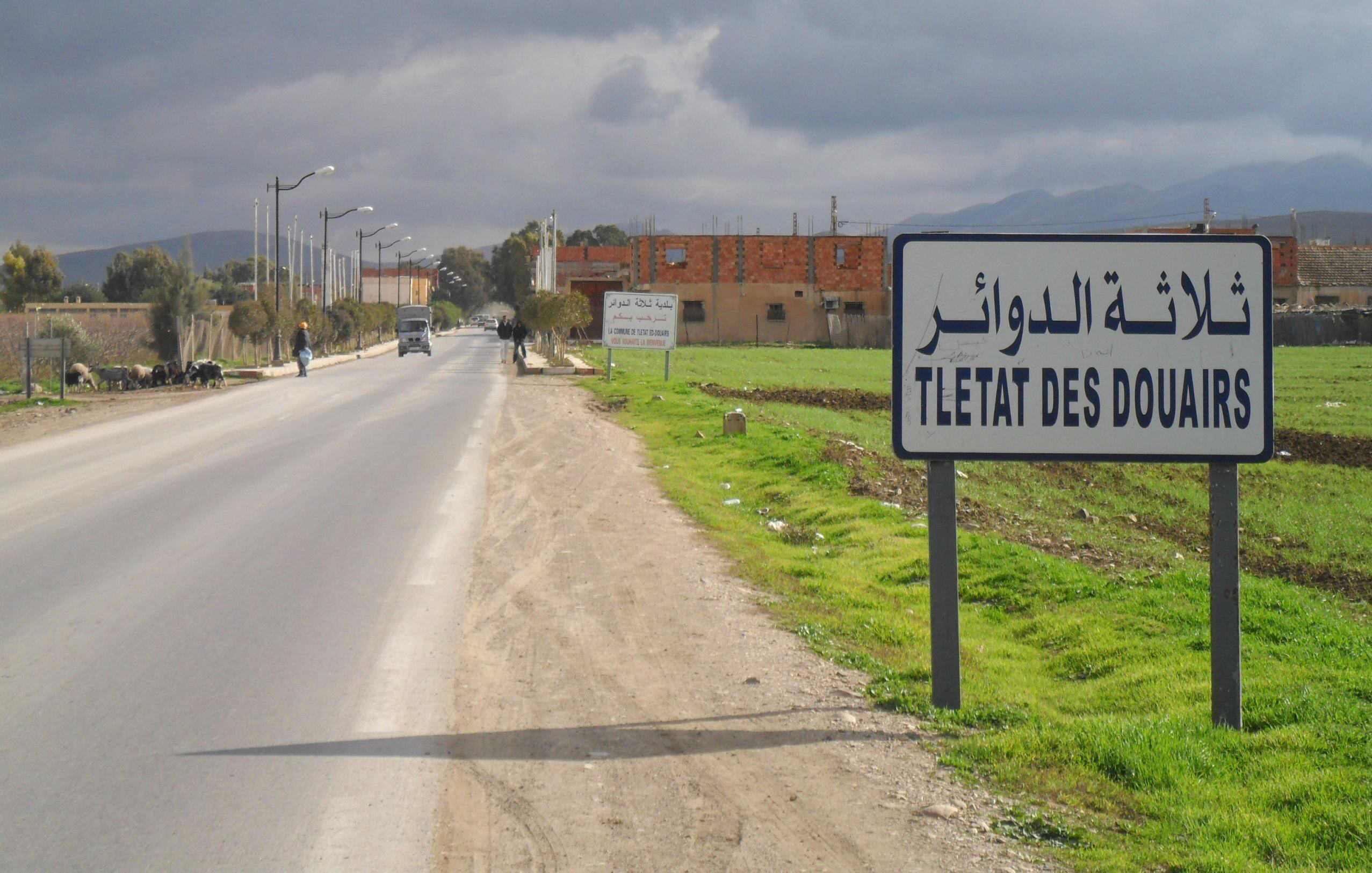
- Interactive map of Tlatet Eddouair
- Country: Algeria
- Province: Médéa Province
- Time zone: UTC+1 (CET)

Tlatet Eddouair is a town and commune in Médéa Province, Algeria.
