= Bachir Chihani =

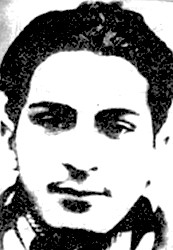
- Born: April 22, 1929; El Khroub, Algeria
- Died: October 23, 1955 (aged 26) Aurès, Algeria
- Cause of death: Assassination by gunshot
- Conflicts: Algerian War

Bachir Chihani (Arabic: شيحاني بشير; April 22, 1929, El Khroub – October 23, 1955, Aurès), also known as Si Messaoud, was an Algerian fighter of the National Liberation Army during the Algerian War.

== Personal life ==
Bachir Chihani was born on April 22, 1929, in El Khroub in a modest family originally from Oued Souf. He joined the Algerian People's Party (PPA) in 1942 and became a section leader in El Khroub. After the party's dissolution, he naturally joined the Movement for the Triumph of Democratic Liberties (MTLD), where he was appointed head of the Batna district in 1952. Shortly afterward, he joined the Special Organization (OS) and became known by the nickname "Si Tahar." He was then appointed head of the party's constituency in February 1953, Béchar region and used the name "Si El Houari". He returned to the Aurès at the end of the year under the name "Si Messaoud".

During the congress of the centralists, he pleaded with Abbas Laghrour, in vain, for the use of armed struggle.

Member of the activist wing of the first movement November 1954 He established relations with the fighters of Sakiet Sidi Youssef on the Algerian-Tunisian border.

== Death ==
In October 1955, Bachir was assassinated by two of his assistants.

== Tributes ==
A liquified gas transport ship belonging to the Hyproc company bears the name of Bachir Chihani. The headquarters of the 4th military region in Ouargla is named after him.
