= Great Mosque of Agadir =

Former mosque in Tlemcen, Algeria

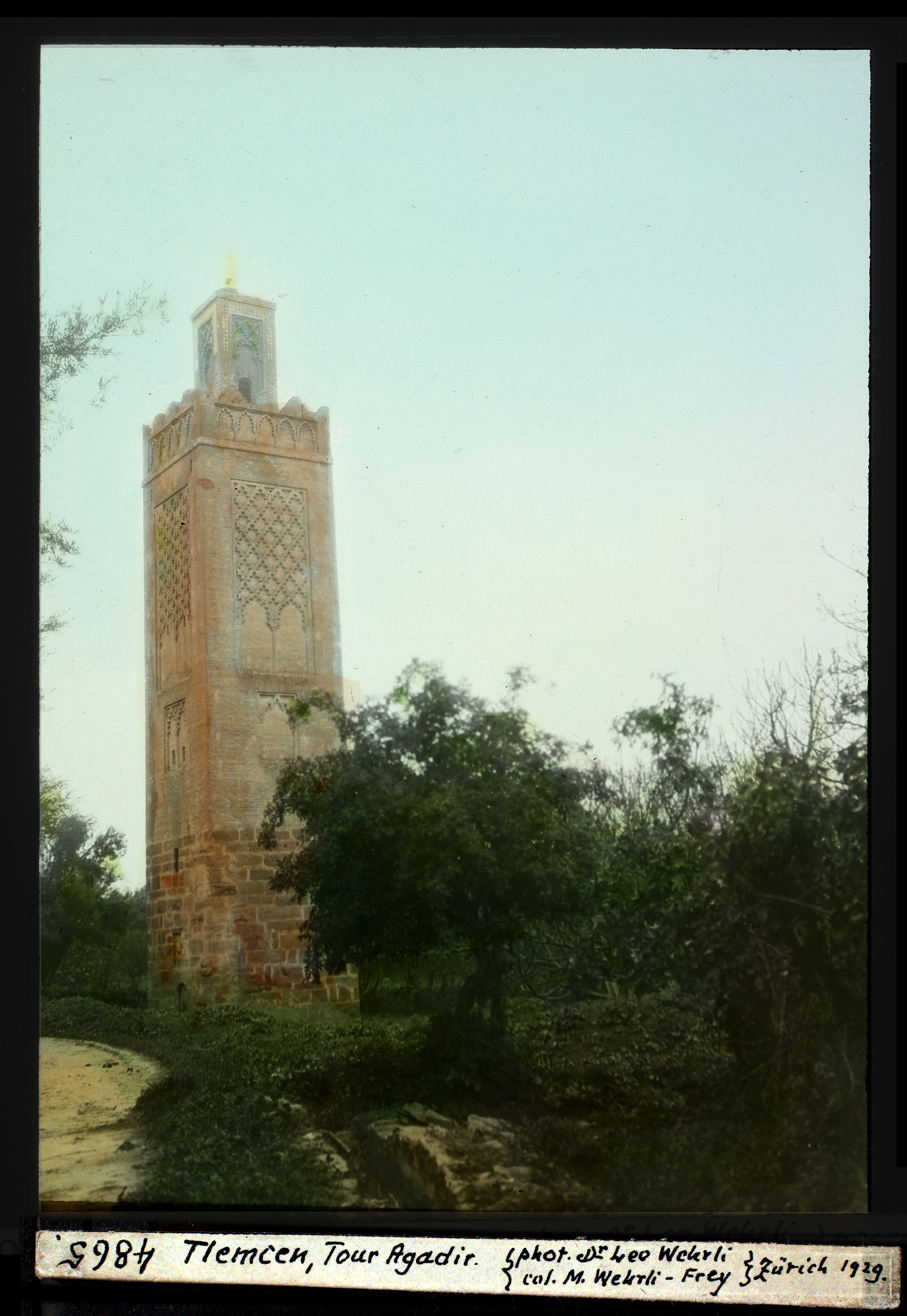
- The remnants of the mosque's Zayyanid minaret, in 1929

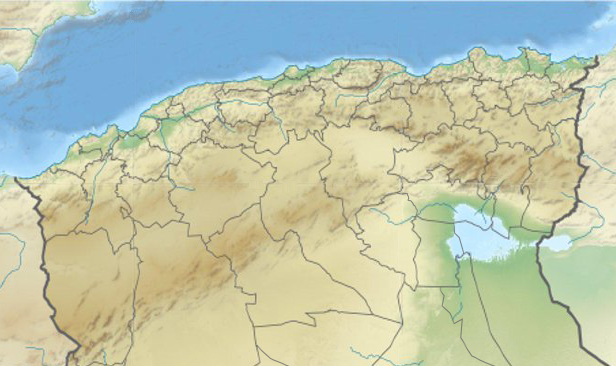
- Location of the former mosque in northern Algeria

Religion
- Affiliation: Islam (former)
- Ecclesiastical or organisational status: Mosque (former)
- Status: Abandoned (in partial ruins)

Location
- Location: Agadir, Tlemcen
- Country: Algeria
- Interactive map of Great Mosque of Agadir
- Coordinates: 34°53′21″N 1°18′0″W

Architecture
- Type: Islamic architecture
- Style: Zayyanid
- Founder: Idris I (791 CE); Yaghmorasan (1283 CE)
- Completed: 174 AH (790/791 CE) (mosque); 681 AH (1282/1283 CE) (minaret)

Specifications
- Minaret: 1
- Minaret height: 26.6 m (87 ft)
- Materials: Bricks

The Great Mosque of Agadir is a former mosque in a partial ruinous state, located in the region of Agadir, in Tlemcen, Algeria.

== History ==
The mosque was most likely built in 174 AH (790/791 CE), during the Idrisid rule of the city. The mosque is in ruins, with only its Zayyanid 26.6-metre-tall (87 ft) brick minaret remaining.

The Great Mosque became increasingly unfrequented as the town developed further west, as well as due to the development of the town of Tagrart (today the centre of Tlemcen), which was founded by the Almoravids slightly to the west of Agadir. Agadir rapidly became a suburb of Tlemcen.

== See also ==
- Islam in Algeria
- List of mosques in Algeria
