= Djamaâ Sidi Ramdane =

Mosque in Algiers, Algeria

- مسجد سيدي رمضان
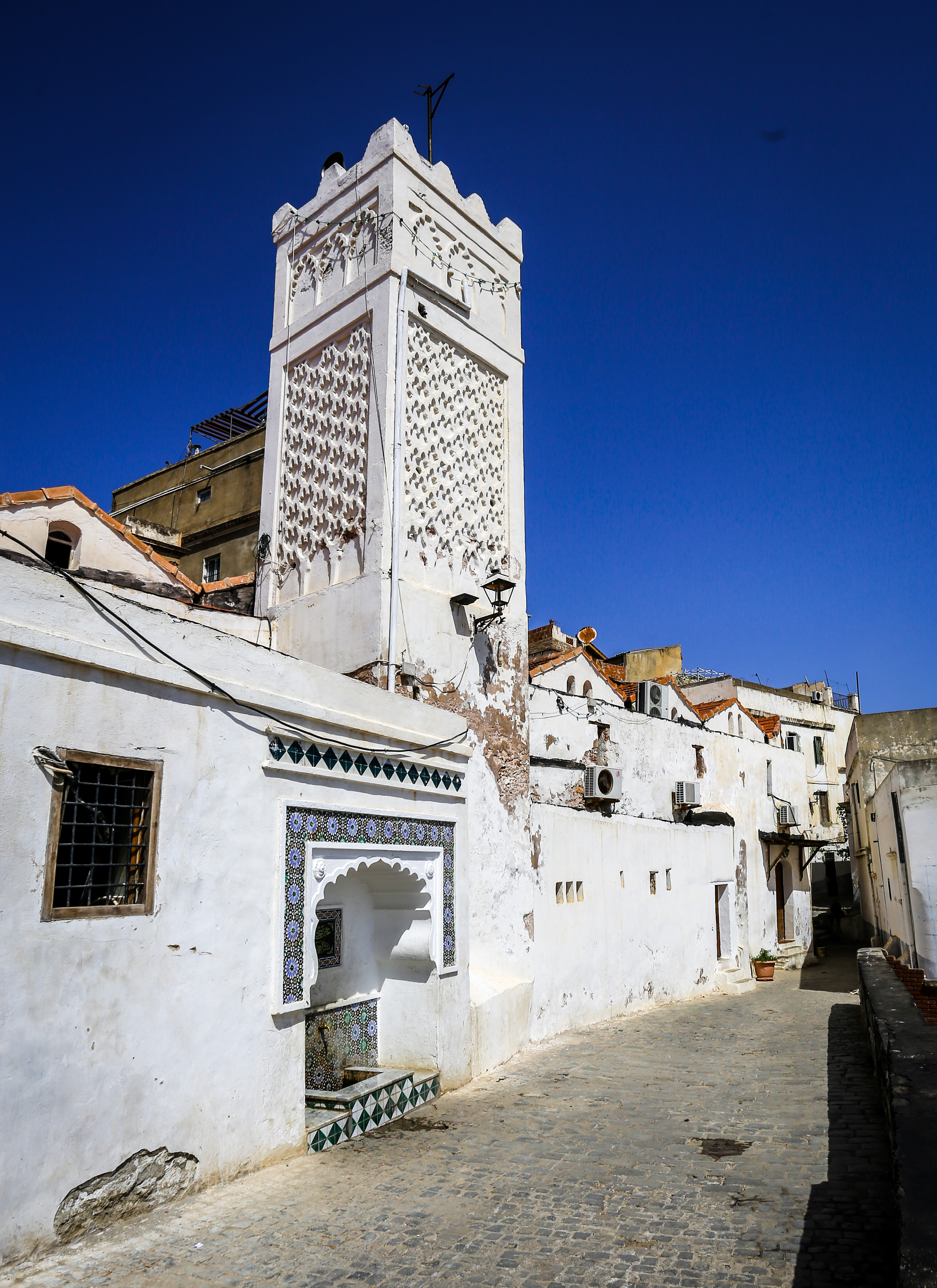
- The mosque in 2020

- Location of the mosque in Algiers

Religion
- Affiliation: Sunni Islam
- Ecclesiastical or organizational status: Mosque; Mausoleum
- Status: Active

Location
- Location: Casbah, Algiers
- Country: Algeria
- Interactive map of Djamaâ Sidi Ramdane
- Coordinates: 36°47′11″N 3°03′31″E

Specifications
- Interior area: 400 m^{2} (4,300 sq ft)
- Minaret: 1
- Minaret height: 32 m (105 ft)

UNESCO World Heritage Site
- Part of: Casbah of Algiers
- Criteria: Cultural: (ii), (v)
- Reference: 565
- Inscription: 1992 (16th Session)

The Djamaâ Sidi Ramdane (Arabic: مسجد سيدي رمضان, lit. 'Sidi Ramadan Mosque') is a Sunni mosque and mausoleum in the city of Algiers, Algeria. Completed during the 11th century CE, the mosque is a part of the Casbah of Algiers, a UNESCO World Heritage Site.

== Etymology ==
The mosque is named after Sidi Ramadan, one of the soldiers who participated in the early conquests of North Africa, led by Uqba ibn Nafi. After the conquest of Algiers, Ramadan was assigned by Uqba as a chief of the city. He was buried in the pillar of the mosque after his death. Another account of the naming origin tells that Sidi Ramadan was a generous wali of the city of Biskra. Sheikh Abdurrahman al-Gilani tells in his work that the actual name of the mosque was Al-Qaid Ramadan Mosque, and mentions the name of Ibn al-Mufta who contributed greatly to the foundation.

== History ==
The date of the mosque's foundation is not known exactly, but it is known that it at least predates the Ottoman period of the city. Georges Marçais, a 20th-century French archeologist, suggested that its foundation could be roughly contemporary with the late 11th-century Great Mosque of Algiers, founded by the Almoravids. Algerian newspaper al-Hiwar, after interviewing local experts and staff at the mosque, reported that current available information dates its foundation to the 10th or 11th century. The mosque is located at the upper part of the city, and constituted the old border of the Casbah (citadel or kasbah) when the city was controlled by Amazigh rulers.

The mosque was designated as the National Heritage of Algeria in 1904. It was also inscribed in the UNESCO World Heritage Site List as a part of the Casbah of Algiers in 1992.

Mohamed Charef served as imam from 1908 until 2011.

== Architecture ==
The mosque has a relatively simple form, with a hypostyle prayer hall divided by rows of arches supported by columns. Along three outer edges of the hall are elevated galleries or balconies that serve as the women's section for prayers. The mosque's attached minaret has sebka decoration carved across its façades. The remains of Sidi Ramadan are housed in a small independent mausoleum next to the mosque.

The mosque has an interior area of 400 square metres (4,300 sq ft) and its minaret is 32 metres (105 ft) high.

== Gallery ==
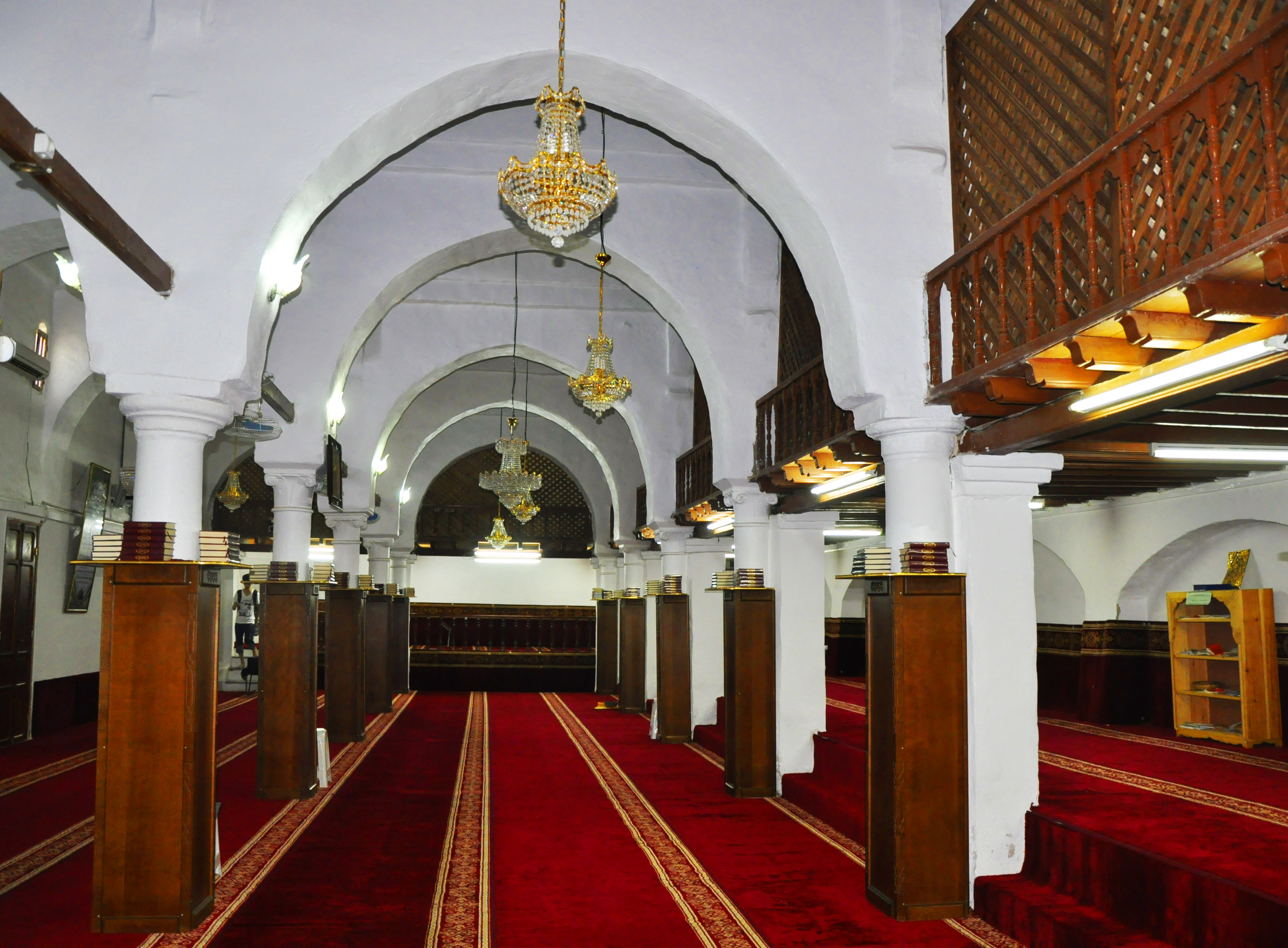
Interior of the mosque

== See also ==
- Islam in Algeria
- List of mosques in Algeria
- List of World Heritage Sites in Algeria
