= Cheria =

Coordinates: 35°16′N 7°45′E

Cheria الشريعة
- Commune and town
- Interactive map of Cheria
- Country: Algeria
- Province: Tébessa Province

Population (2008 Census)
  - Total: 75,344
- Time zone: UTC+1 (CET)

Cheria (Arabic: الشريعة) is a town and commune in Tébessa Province in north-eastern Algeria.
