= Oued Koriche =

Coordinates: 36°46′50″N 3°02′34″E

- Interactive map of Oued Koriche
- Country: Algeria
- Province: Algiers
- Time zone: UTC+1 (West Africa Time)

Oued Koriche is a suburb of the city of Algiers in northern Algeria.
