= Safir Mosque =

Mosque in Algiers, Algeria

- مسجد سفير
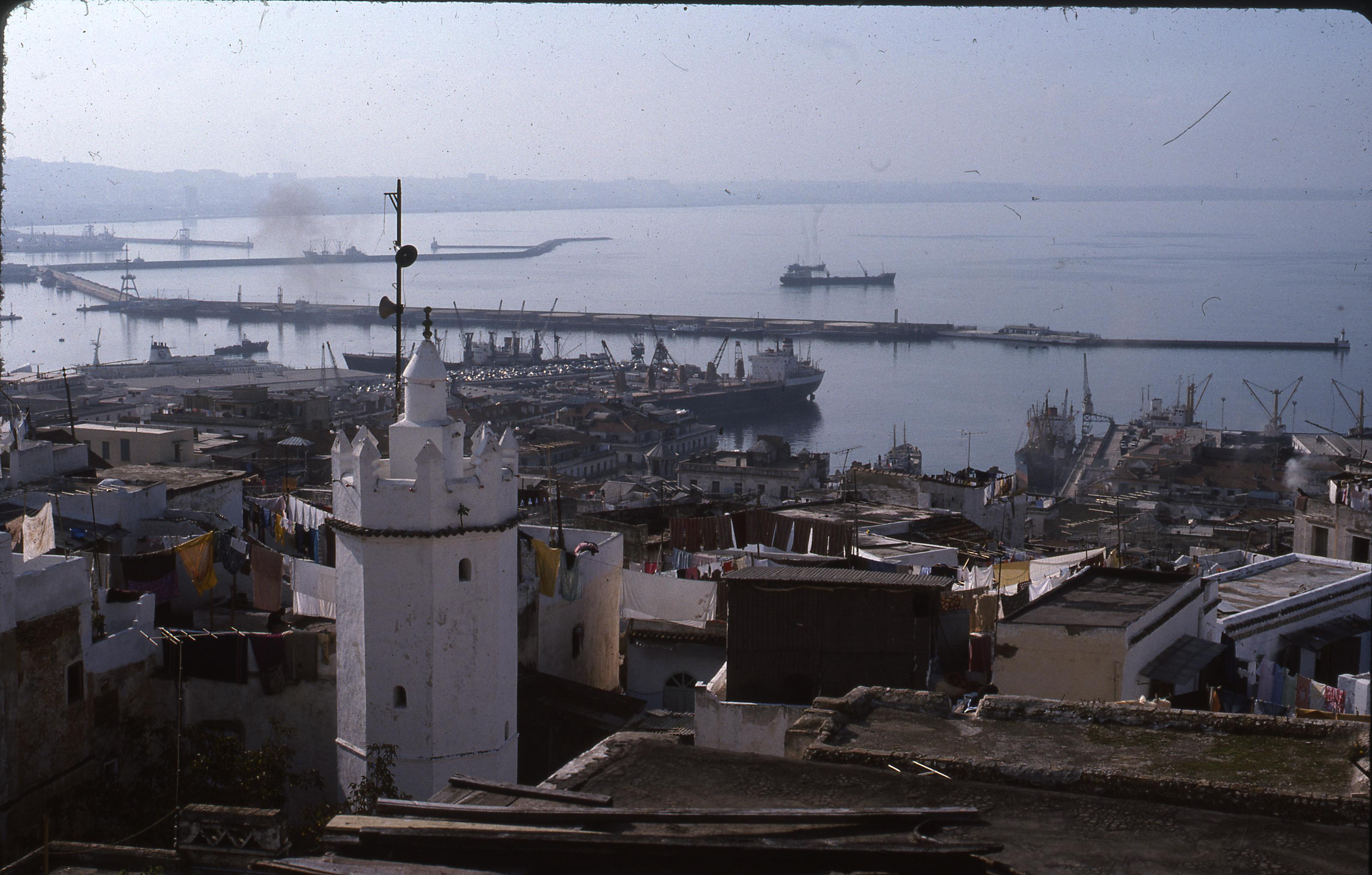
- The mosque's minaret, by André Raymond

- Location of the mosque in Algiers

Religion
- Affiliation: Sunni Islam
- Ecclesiastical or organisational status: Mosque
- Status: Active

Location
- Location: Casbah, Algiers
- Country: Algeria
- Interactive map of Safir Mosque
- Coordinates: 36°47′00″N 3°03′29″E

Architecture
- Type: Islamic architecture
- Style: Moorish
- Completed: 1534 CE

UNESCO World Heritage Site
- Part of: Casbah of Algiers
- Criteria: Cultural: (ii), (v)
- Reference: 565
- Inscription: 1992 (16th Session)

The Safir Mosque (Arabic: مسجد سفير or جامع سفير) is a Sunni mosque in the city of Algiers, Algeria. The Moorish-style mosque was completed in 1534 CE and is located inside the medina quarter of the Casbah of Algiers, a UNESCO World Heritage Site.

== Etymology ==
The mosque was initially called as Jami Caid Safar bin Abdullah, but later it was renamed to Safir Mosque or Jami Safir after around 18th century. Safir of the name is considered as Safar bin Abdullah. Safar was originally a Christian slave who converted to Islam, learned Arabic and memorized the entire Qur'an; then freed and promoted general by Hayreddin Barbarossa.

== History ==
The mosque was completed in 1534, in the place few meters away from the Mosque-Zawiya of Sidi Muhammad Sharif. The mosque was constructed on a land where was newly included into the medina after the establishment of new city walls in order to expand the quarter. The construction date is recorded in the book available in the mosque; the groundbreaking was in Rajab of 940 AH, and the completion is the second of Rabi' al-awwal in 941 AH, roughly equal to 11 September 1534, which means the construction took nine months.

== See also ==
- Islam in Algeria
- List of mosques in Algeria
