= Oued Beni Barbar =

Coordinates: 34°50′14.9″N 07°01′52″E

Oued Beni Barbar is a wadi in Algeria. It is in the Nemencha area of the sahel, a semi-arid region north of the Sahara and is near Seiar and Bled Izaouene. Its headwater is in Djebel Metred and Djebel Moussa. The river has an average elevation of 81 metres (266 ft) above sea level. The wadi is named for the Beni Barbar tribe who invaded and settled the area in the Middle Ages. The Oued is a ravine, delimited by relatively strong banks, which in the rainy season becomes a stream.

During the Roman Empire, a statue of the Emperor Septimius Severus was erected at the wadi.
