= Morsott =

Coordinates: 35°40′N 8°01′E

Morsott مرسط
- Commune and town
- Country: Algeria
- Province: Tébessa Province

Area
  - Total: 1,632 sq mi (4,227 km^{2})
  - Land: 474 sq mi (1,227 km^{2})

Population (2014)
  - Total: 54,332
  - Density: 120/sq mi (45/km^{2})
- Time zone: UTC+1 (West Africa Time (UTC+1))
- Postal code: 1200
- Area code: 12

Morsott is a town and commune in Tébessa Province in north-eastern Algeria.
