= Tebessa District =

- District
- Country: Algeria
- Province: Tébessa Province
- Chief town: Tébessa

Area
  - Total: 71 sq mi (184 km^{2})

Population (2008)
  - Total: 196,537
  - Density: 2.6/sq mi (1/km^{2})
- Time zone: UTC+1 (CET)

Tebessa district is an Algerian administrative district located in the Province of Tébessa. Its chief town is located on the eponymous town of Tébessa.
