= Guelaât Bou Sbaâ District =

Guelaât BouSbaa District دائرة قلعة بو صبع
- District
- Map of Guelma Province highlighting the district

- Location within Algeria
- Country: Algeria
- Province: Guelma
- District seat: Guelaât Bou Sbaâ

Population (1998)
  - Total: 52,600
- Time zone: UTC+01 (CET)
- Municipalities: 6

Guelaât Bou Sbaâ is a district in Guelma Province, Algeria. It ranks second in the province in terms of population, after Guelma District. It was named after its capital, Guelaât Bou Sbaâ.

== Municipalities ==
The district is further divided into 6 municipalities, which is the highest number in the province:

- Guelaât Bou Sbaâ
- Nechmaya
- Djeballah Khemissi
- Boumahra Ahmed
- Beni Mezline
- Belkheir
