= Bouchegouf District =

Boughouf
- Commune and town
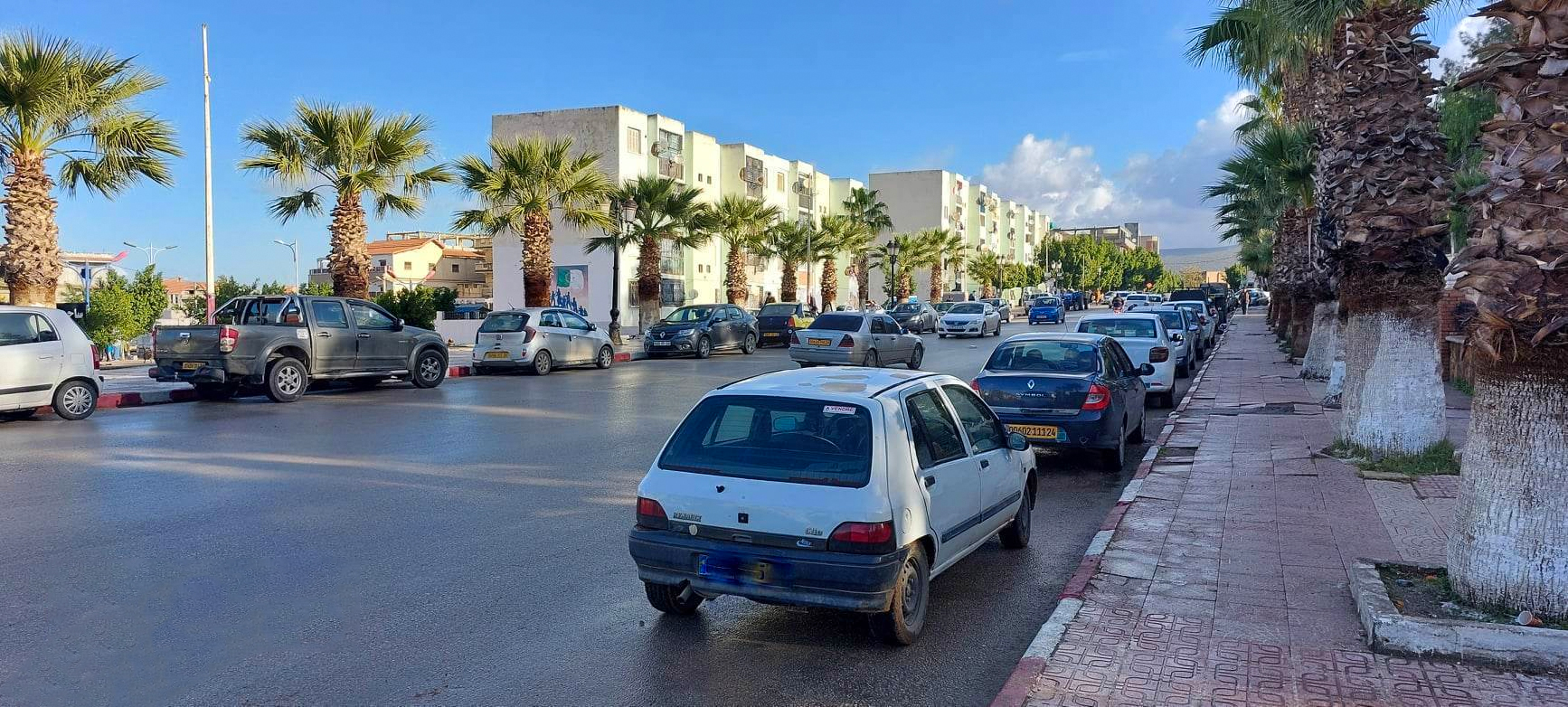

- Map of Guelma Province highlighting the district

- Location of district in Algeria map
- Coordinates: 36.4717°N 7.7298°E
- Country: Algeria
- Province: Guelma Province
- Time zone: UTC+1 (CET)

Bouchegouf is a town and district in Guelma Province, Algeria.

== Town ==
The town of Bouchegouf, the ancient Niniba, is the third largest in the wilaya of Guelma in eastern Algeria, 35 km from its capital, 52 km from the wilaya of Annaba and 42 km from that of Souk Ahras. It is 600 km from the national capital, Algiers and 300 km from Tunisia. Under French colonial rule, it was called Duvivier. Of the 25,443 inhabitants of the district, 19,690 live in the town.

== Archaeology ==
The region of which Bouchegouf forms part contains some 40 archaeological sites of the prehistoric, protohistoric, Numidian, Roman and Byzantine periods.

The few protohistoric remains include the necropolis of Nador covering much of the eastern mountainside; the dolmens and Libyan steles at the end of Jebel Grine near Mechta de Fedj-Abdallah; the rock-cut vaults in the Sedjerma region; and a rock carving of a lion at Gafeza. Many pre-Roman tomb inscriptions in the Libyan language or in both Latin and Libyan have been published in the Recueil des Inscriptions Libyques, Nos. 446, 447, 448, 449. Stele 451 at Bouchegouf has with two parallel inscriptions, one in Libyan, the other in Punic. The Roman era is represented by the two Roman roads reported in the Tabula Peutingeriana: the imperial road from Hippo Regius by way of Vicus Iuliani to Tipaza (Tifeche) with ruins of a Roman bridge on the Seybouse; and that from Hippona (Annaba) to Thagaste (Tébessa) by way of Bouchegouf.

Important Roman ruins at Medjez-Sfa, on the left bank of the wadi Melah include an inscription of a slave of an estate. Among the dozen Latin inscriptions found at Zattara near Kef bou Zioun is an important one attesting to its status as a municipium: municipii Zat(taresis) porticu et rostris An extensive ancient cemetery at Koudiet el Batum has rock-cut tombs with human-shaped hollows, sarcophagi, and inscribed tombstones. At Debidib are Roman ruins of a large farmhouse with baths and cisterns. At the wayside station of wadi Frarah at Zaouiat el Guelaa, a round hill on the right bank of the Seybouse, which the river flows around, is topped by a rectangular fort of plain mortarless blocks.

== Geological overview ==
The hilly area known as Bouchegouf is about 500 meters above sea level and mainly consists of clay and sandstone rock types that provide a home for oak trees. The valleys of Seybouse and Mellah rivers have elevations that range between 29 and 107 meters and consist of alluvium with thermal springs that have been used since the time of Romans.

== Research history ==
Archaeological research on the Bouchegouf region has a long history. These include notes from studies dating back to the nineteenth century written by officers of the French army who had the opportunity to explore the territory in collaboration with Algerian civilians from the administrative and academic sectors. They should at Charles de Vigneral, Levistre Chassaigne and summarize the results of excavations at Dolmen di Nador and Wadi Frarah. Reboud et Mercier, published several notes on the region. Mougel. was the recipient of the Academy of Hippo, who lived fifteen years has Duvivier (Bouchegouf) until 1894. As administrative officer to the curia, he conducted several surveys in the region, publishing in the Bulletin of the Academy of Hippo. St. Gsell published a large number of inscriptions from the region of Bouchegouf and its surroundings.

Geomorphological data analysis, the territory was Bouchegouf strategic roads and ancient human settlements. Its strategic geographical position for transport, is in the form of a node where the ancient main roads (Thagaste Hippo, Hippo Tifeche) met. The confluence of two rivers (el Mellah and Seybouse) provided a water resource and the possibility of transporting goods. The territory is rich in archaeological evidence of its witnesses agricultural productivity (olive oil, cereals).

Archaeological research conducted so far, now dated and incomplete, have been in a logical menu colonialist and selective. Archaeological records were made on the basis of signs and sporadic discoveries. The surveys were ad hoc and based on the criteria of monumentality with a predilection philological epigraphic material. Indeed, the wealth of the territory in terms of ancient epigraphic heritage, discovered in the area remains unexplored and has not been reading organic and territorial. A multidisciplinary review of the entries in a territorial logic related to archaeological traces still exist, would better understand the social and legal status of the area especially with the presence of local names and pre-Roman (nota) which suggests an interaction between fervent local culture and Roman culture.

The intention is to retain the material published so far and compare with a systematic exploration of the territory that would bring to the detailed documentation of archaeological sites, the communication network with data geomorphological, pedological, and geological. All of its investigation would include the distribution of human settlement in the region by analyzing the use and occupancy of land and socio-economic systems generated.

== Municipalities ==
The district is divided into 4 municipalities:

- Bouchegouf
- Oued Fragha
- Aïn Ben Beida
- Medjez Sfa
