= Nadorite =

Mineral

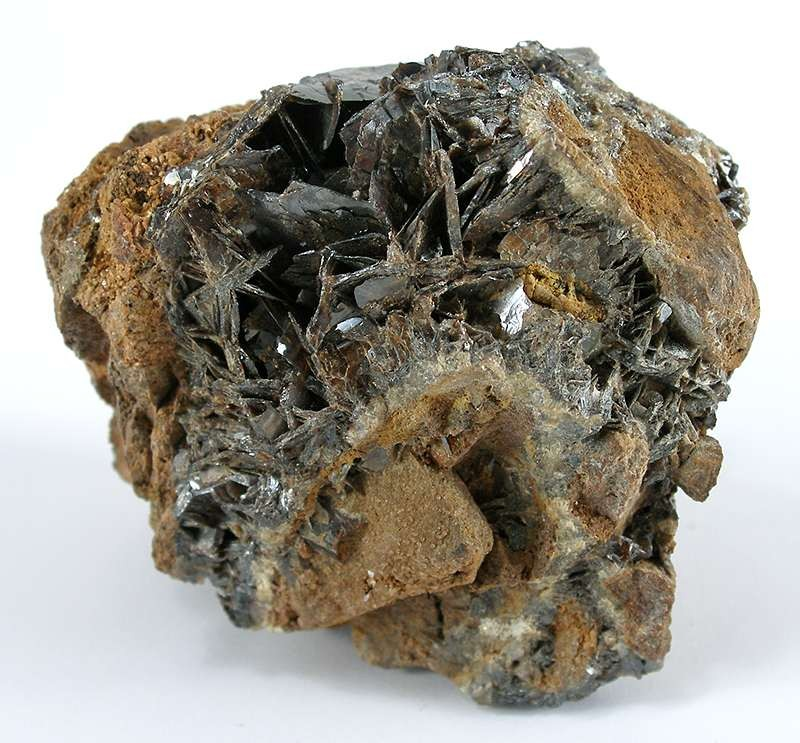

General
- Category: Halide mineral
- Formula: PbSbO_{2}Cl
- IMA symbol: Nad
- Strunz classification: 3.DC.30
- Crystal system: Orthorhombic
- Crystal class: Dipyramidal (mmm); H-M Symbol: (2/m 2/m 2/m)
- Space group: Bmmb

Identification
- Color: Brown, brownish-yellow, yellow
- Twinning: On {101}, nearly perpendicular (91°45'), common
- Cleavage: On {010}, perfect
- Fracture: Uneven
- Mohs scale hardness: 3 1/2 - 4
- Luster: Adamantine, Resinous
- Streak: White, yellow to yellowish white
- Diaphaneity: Translucent
- Density: 7
- Refractive index: n_{α} = 2.300 n_{β} = 2.340 - 2.350 n_{γ} = 2.360 - 2.400
- Birefringence: δ = 0.060 - 0.100
- Dispersion: Strong
- Alters to: To cerussite

Nadorite is a mineral with the chemical formula PbSbO_{2}Cl. It crystallizes in the orthorhombic crystal system and is brown, brownish-yellow or yellow in color, with a white or yellowish-white streak.

Nadorite is named after Djebel Nador in Hammam N'Bail, Algeria, where it was first identified in 1870.

== Geologic occurrence ==
Djebel Nador and Djebel Debbar (both in the Guelma Province of Algeria) are its co-type localities. Also found as an alteration product of jamesonite in Cornwall, England.

== Bibliography ==
- Palache, P.; Berman H.; Frondel, C. (1960). "Dana's System of Mineralogy, Volume II: Halides, Nitrates, Borates, Carbonates, Sulfates, Phosphates, Arsenates, Tungstates, Molybdates, Etc. (Seventh Edition)" John Wiley and Sons, Inc., New York, pp. 1039-1041.
