= Hammam N'Bails District =

Hammam N'Bails District دائرة حمام النبائل
- District
- Map of Guelma Province highlighting the district

- Location of district in Algeria map
- Country: Algeria
- Province: Guelma
- District seat: Hammam N'Bails

Population (1998)
  - Total: 35,410
- Time zone: UTC+01 (CET)
- Municipalities: 3

Hammam N'Bails is a district in Guelma Province, Algeria. It was named after its capital, the spa of Hammam N'Bails.

== Municipalities ==
The district is further divided into 3 municipalities:

- Hammam N'Bails
- Dahouara
- Oued Cheham
