= Héliopolis District =

Héliopolis District دائرة هيليوبوليس
- District
- Map of Guelma Province highlighting the district

- Location of district in Algeria map
- Country: Algeria
- Province: Guelma
- District seat: Héliopolis

Population (1998)
  - Total: 38,901
- Time zone: UTC+01 (CET)
- Municipalities: 3

Héliopolis is a district in Guelma Province, Algeria. It was named after its capital, Héliopolis.

== Municipalities ==
The district is further divided into 3 municipalities, which is the highest number for any district in the province:

- Héliopolis
- El Fedjoudj
- Bouati Mahmoud
