= Oued Zenati District =

Oued Zenati District دائرة وادي الزناتي
- District
- Map of Guelma Province highlighting the district

- Location of district in Algeria map
- Coordinates: 36°21′N 7°05′E
- Country: Algeria
- Province: Guelma
- District seat: Oued Zenati

Population (1998)
  - Total: 44,622
- Time zone: UTC+01 (CET)
- Municipalities: 3

Oued Zenati is a district in Guelma Province, Algeria. It was named after its capital, Oued Zenati, the second most populous municipality in the province.

== Municipalities ==
The district is further divided into 3 municipalities:

- Oued Zenati
- Bordj Sabat
- Aïn Reggada
