= Khezaras District =

Khezaras District دائرة الخزارة
- District
- Map of Guelma Province highlighting the district

- Location of district in Algeria map
- Country: Algeria
- Province: Guelma
- District seat: Khezara

Population (1998)
  - Total: 18,812
- Time zone: UTC+01 (CET)
- Municipalities: 3

Khezaras is a district in Guelma Province, Algeria. It was named after its capital, Khezara.

== Municipalities ==
The district is further divided into 3 municipalities:

- Khezara
- Bouhachana
- Aïn Sandel
