= Houari Boumédienne District =

Houari Boumédienne District دائرة هواري بومدين
- District
- Map of Guelma Province highlighting the district

- Location of district in Algeria map
- Country: Algeria
- Province: Guelma
- District seat: Houari Boumediènne

Population (1998)
  - Total: 18,146
- Time zone: UTC+01 (CET)
- Municipalities: 4

Houari Boumédienne is a district in the Guelma Province of Algeria. It was named after former President of Algeria, Houari Boumédienne.

== Municipalities ==
The district is further divided into 4 municipalities, which is the highest number for any district in the province:

- Houari Boumediènne
- Medjez Amar
- Ras El Agba
- Salaoua Announa
