= Tamlouka =

Tamlouka تاملوكة Montcalm
- Commune and town
- Tamlouka
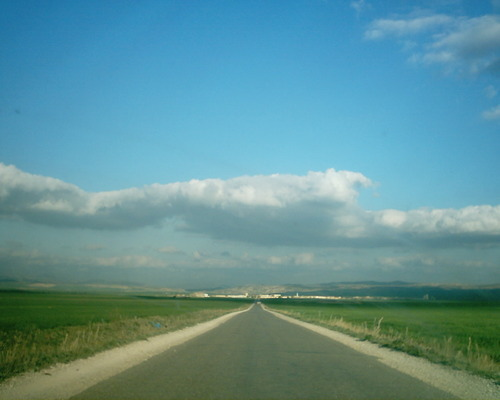

- Location within Algeria
- Country: Algeria
- Province: Guelma Province

Government
  - Mayor: Driss Guerba

Population (1998)
  - Total: 7,791
- Time zone: UTC+1 (CET)

Tamlouka (Arabic: تاملوكة) is a small city of about 22.000 inhabitants in the District of Aïn Makhlouf of the Guelma Province in the northeast of Algeria. It is located at the intersection of W10 and W133, between the cities of Oued Zenati and Aïn Beïda. It is located 60 kilometres from Guelma, capital of the province. Prior to the mass renaming of towns after Algeria's independence, this town was known by the French name Montcalm. Most of the people in the city are Berber Chaouis, whose main dialect was one of Berber languages, but now most people know only Maghrebi Arabic.
