= Hammam Debagh District =

Hammam Debagh District دائرة حمام دباغ
- District
- Map of Guelma Province highlighting the district

- Location of district in Algeria map
- Country: Algeria
- Province: Guelma
- District seat: Hammam Debagh

Population (1998)
  - Total: 28,043
- Time zone: UTC+01 (CET)
- Municipalities: 3

Hammam Debagh is a district in Guelma Province, Algeria. It was named after its capital, the spa of Hammam Debagh.

== Municipalities ==
The district is further divided into 3 municipalities, which is the highest number in the province:

- Hammam Debagh
- Roknia
- Bou Hamdane
