= Hammam Ouled Ali =

Hammam Ouled Ali (Arabic: حمام أولاد علي) is a place located at 36°34′28.63″N 7°22′49.74″E in Guelma Province, Algeria south of Bouati Mahmoud.

The area is approximately 416 meters above sea level.

Since Roman times the town has been renown for its thermal springs, hence the name "hammam".

Nearby towns include Djebel Bou Chahrene and Koudiet Mrâh el Ba’dj. Héliopolis, Algeria is twenty kilometers to the south.

The temperature ranges from 5 °c to around 35°c in summer and rainfall is concentrated in winter with summers being dry.
