= Aïn Makhlouf District =

Aïn Makhlouf District دائرة عين مخلوف
- District
- Map of Guelma Province highlighting the district

- Location of district in Algeria map
- Country: Algeria
- Province: Guelma
- District seat: Aïn Makhlouf

Population (1998)
  - Total: 35,414
- Time zone: UTC+01 (CET)
- Municipalities: 3

Aïn Makhlouf is a district in Guelma Province, Algeria. It was named after its capital, Aïn Makhlouf.

== Municipalities ==
The district is further divided into 3 municipalities:

- Aïn Makhlouf
- Aïn Larbi
- Tamlouka
