= Ouled Ali =

Ouled Ali may refer to:

- Ouled Ali, Boumerdès, village in the Boumerdès Province in Kabylie, Algeria
- Hammam Ouled Ali, place in Guelma Province, Algeria
