= Taieb =

Taieb or Taïeb may refer to:

- Jacqueline Taïeb (born 1948), French singer and songwriter
- Maurice Taieb, (born 1935), Tunisian born French geologist and paleoanthropologist
- Taïeb Boulahrouf (born 1923), Algerian politician and militant nationalist during the Algerian Liberation War
- Walter Taieb (born 1973), French composer and conductor

== See also ==
- Stade Taïeb Mhiri, multi-purpose stadium in Sfax, Tunisia
