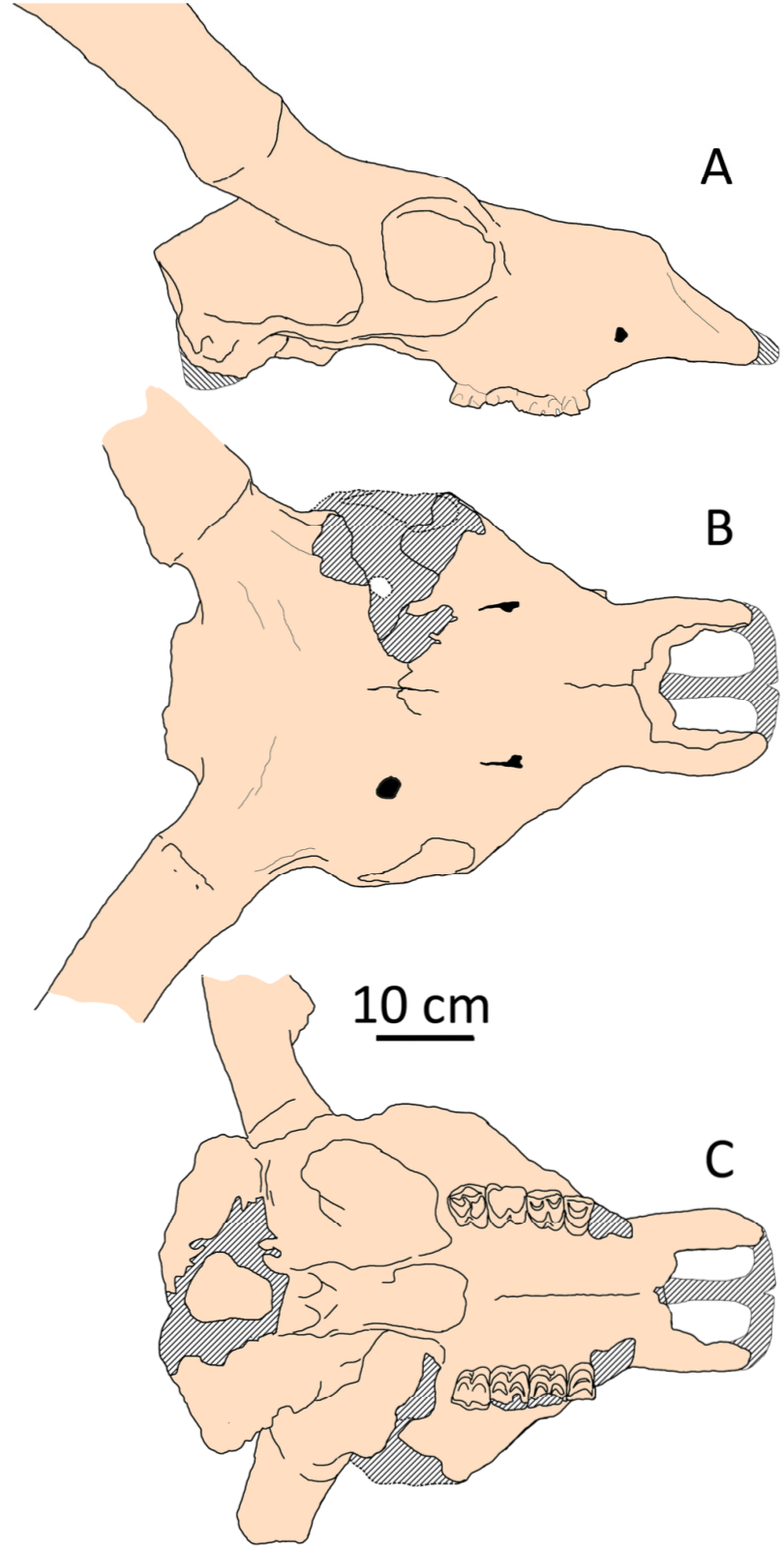
- Skull in side-on (top) top-down (middle) and from below (bottom)

Scientific classification
- Kingdom: Animalia
- Phylum: Chordata
- Class: Mammalia
- Order: Artiodactyla
- Family: Cervidae
- Genus: †Megaceroides; Joleaud, 1914
- Species: †M. algericus

Binomial name
- †Megaceroides algericus (Lydekker, 1890)

Synonyms
- Cervus pachygenys Pomel, 1892

= Megaceroides algericus =

Megaceroides algericus Temporal range: Late Pleistocene–Holocene

Extinct species of deer native to North Africa

Megaceroides algericus is an extinct species of deer known from the Late Pleistocene to the Holocene of North Africa. It is one of only two species of deer known to have been native to the African continent, alongside the Barbary stag, a subspecies of red deer. It is considered to be closely related to the giant deer species of Eurasia.

== Taxonomy ==
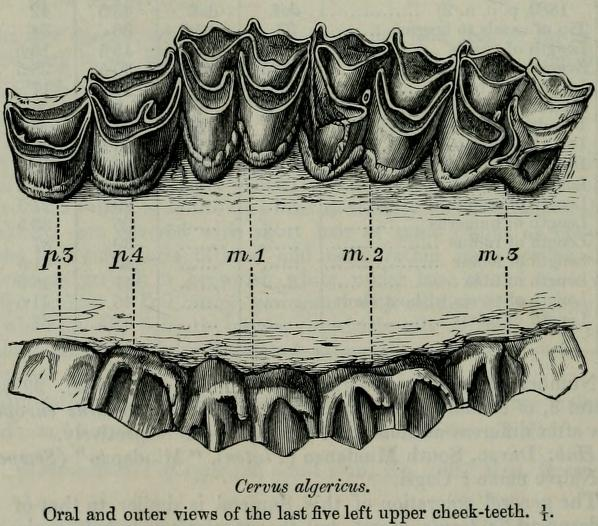
Teeth of the holotype maxilla from Lydekker, 1890

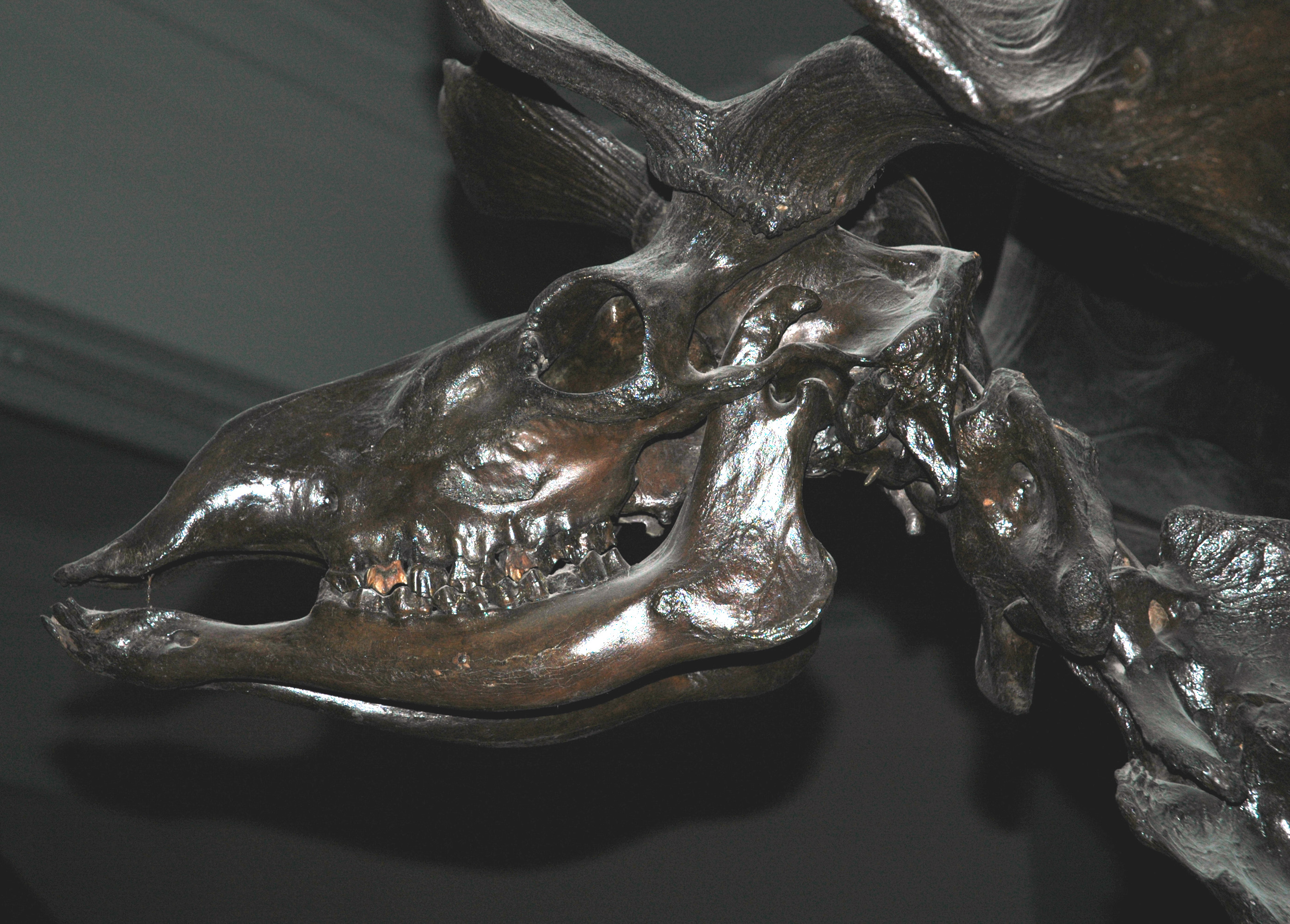
Skull of Megaloceros giganteus, a suggested close relative of Megaceroides

The species was first described by Richard Lydekker as Cervus algericus in 1890 from a maxilla with teeth found near Hammam Maskhoutine in Algeria. The species Cervus pachygenys was erected for a pachyostotic mandible and an isolated molar found in Algeria by Auguste Pomel in 1892. Léonce Joleaud in two publications in 1914 and 1916 synonymised the two species, and suggested affinities with the giant deer of Europe, and placed it in the newly erected subgenus Megaceroides within the genus Megaceros (junior synonym of Megaloceros) as the type species. Camille Arambourg in publications in 1932 and 1938 raised Megaceroides to the full genus rank, and described additional cranial material, which were figured but not described in detail.

In 1953 Augusto Azzaroli published a systematic taxonomy for Megaloceros, he avoided using the name Megaceroides, and suggested affinities to his proposed "verticornis group" of Megaloceros species, and noted its similarities to Sinomegaceros pachyosteus. The taxonomic relationships of giant deer and their smaller insular relatives (often referred to collectively as members of the tribe Megacerini, though it is not known whether the grouping is monophyletic) are unresolved, with a long and convoluted taxonomic history. The genus Megaceroides is also used as a synonym of the "giant deer" genus Praemegaceros by some authors, reflecting to its unresolved taxonomic position with respect to other giant deer. It was considered to belong to Megaloceros by Hadjouis in 1990 with Megaceroides at subgenus rank. Affinities with Megaloceros have been suggested based on several morphological grounds. A comprehensive description of the taxon by Roman Croitor published in 2016 suggested that it originated from Megaloceros mugharensis from the Middle Pleistocene of the Levant (which has been alternatively considered by other authors to be a type of fallow deer as Dama clactoniana mugharensis), with Middle Pleistocene cervid remains from North Africa possibly belonging to an ancestor of the species, and retained Megaceroides at generic rank. Croitor also proposed based on the craniodental morphology of Megaceroides algericus that it was also closely related to the Eurasian giant deer/Irish elk Megaloceros giganteus.

== Distribution ==
The species was found within the Mediterranean region of northwest Africa north of the Atlas Mountains, with 26 known localities within Algeria and Morocco, extending from Bizmoune cave near Essaouira in the west to Hammam Maskhoutine and Puits des Chaachas in the East. The oldest known remains of the species are around 24,000 years Before Present. No other deer are known to have been native to the African continent aside from M. algericus and the Barbary stag, an extant subspecies of red deer, which is also native to the same area of northwest Africa.

== Description ==
The species is known from limited material, and knowledge of post-cranial remains and antlers are poor. The estimated size of the animal is smaller than a red deer but slightly larger than a fallow deer. It is known from a mostly complete skull of an aged individual with worn teeth found near Aïn Bénian in Algeria, alongside other fragmentary crania. The estimated body mass is approximately 100 kilograms (220 lb).

The skull is broad, but the length of the skull, specifically the splanchnocranium (the region of the skull behind the dental region) is relatively short. This combination of a wide but proportionally short skull is a morphology that is unknown in any other deer species. The two halves of the mandible are estimated to have a contact angle of 60 degrees, which is extremely wide in comparison to other deer, to compensate for the wide skull. The parietals are flat, with a straight facial profile. The eyes face further outward and less forward than Sinomegaceros pachyosteus. The skull and dentary exhibit extreme thickening (pachyostosis) somewhat similar to that in Megaloceros, unlike Megaloceros, the vomer is largely unaffected. The pachyostosis is among the most extreme of any known mammal. The upper canines are absent (there are no sockets for them present on the Aïn Bénian skull) and the lower fourth premolar (P4) is molarised (molar-like in morphology). The preserved proximal (closer to the skull) portion of the antler is straight and cylindrical in cross section, and orientated anteriorly (forwards), laterally (outwards away from the midline of the skull) and slightly dorsally (upwards relative to the skull), the antler becomes flattened distally (towards the end away from the skull).

An isolated radius suggested to belong to the taxon is known from Berrouaghia, which is robust and proportionally short in comparison to other cervids, and the mid shaft measurement of 40mm is proportionally wider than that of M. giganteus. Croitor suggests that several rock art drawings from the Altas and the Sahara depict the taxon, which show horned animals, some with antler like tines including proportionally long tails. This interpretation, which had previously been suggested by other authors, has been criticised, noting that there are no known remains for the taxon from the Sahara, and that previous interpretations of the rock art representing deer had been based on faulty fossil identification of deer in Mali.

== Ecology ==
The ecology of the species is unclear owing to the lack of living analogues for its unique morphology. On several morphological grounds, Croitor proposed that its habits were peri- or semiaquatic, with the weak mastication ability and polished cheek teeth by attrition suggesting a preference for soft water plants, with taking of non-aquatic forage during the dry seasons. The extreme pachyostosis was suggested to have been a protection against attacks by crocodiles.

== Extinction ==
Remains from the Tamar Hat and Taza I archaeological sites suggests that the species may have been hunted by people. The latest known date for the species from Bizmoune has an age estimated between 6641 and 6009 cal BP (4691 to 4059 BCE) at the end of the Epipaleolithic. The Holocene transition in North Africa also saw other extinctions of ungulates, including Gazella, Equus, Camelus, the African subspecies of the aurochs and Syncerus antiquus.
