= 1954 in Algeria =

- Decades: 1930s; 1940s; 1950s; 1960s; 1970s
- See also: History of Algeria; List of years in Algeria

1954 in Algeria:

== Events ==
- September 9 – The 6.7 M_{w} Chlef earthquake shakes northern Algeria with a maximum Mercalli intensity of XI (Extreme). The shock destroyed Orléansville, left 1,243–1,409 dead, and 5,000 injured.
- November 1 – The movement towards Algerian independence from France starts with the founding of the National Liberation Front.

== Births ==
- April 7 – Louisa Hanoune, politician and head of Algeria's Parti des Travailleurs (PT), or Workers' Party.
- October 8 – Jean Fernandez, football manager
- October 19 – Abdallah Baali, diplomat
