= Ben Djerrah =

Coordinates: 36°25′56″N 7°22′07″E

Ben Djerrah بلدية بن جراح
- Municipality
- Commune of Ben Djerrah
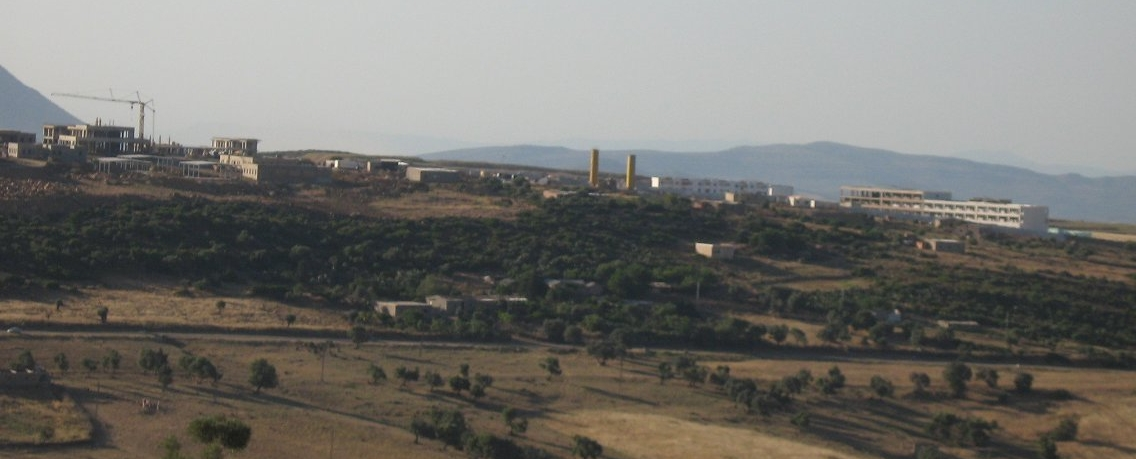
- Ben Djerrah as seen from the southwest
- Interactive map of Ben Djerrah
- Country: Algeria
- Province: Guelma
- District: Guelma

Government
  - PMA Seats: 7

Population (1998)
  - Total: 4,202
- Time zone: UTC+01 (CET)
- Postal code: 24145
- ONS code: 2411

Ben Djerrah is a municipality in Guelma province, Algeria. It is located in Guelma district, to the southwest of the nearby city of Guelma. Its main settlement is the town of Ben Djerrah, even though the suburban sprawl of Guelma in the direction of Ben Djerrah is significant, seeing that it is the only other municipality in the district. It is the site of the forest of Aïn Séfra (named after the main village in the forest, unrelated to the eponymous larger city), as well as an important military garrison. It is connected by a Province Highway to southwestern Guelma, as well as by another shorter road connecting it to the inner suburbs of Guelma.

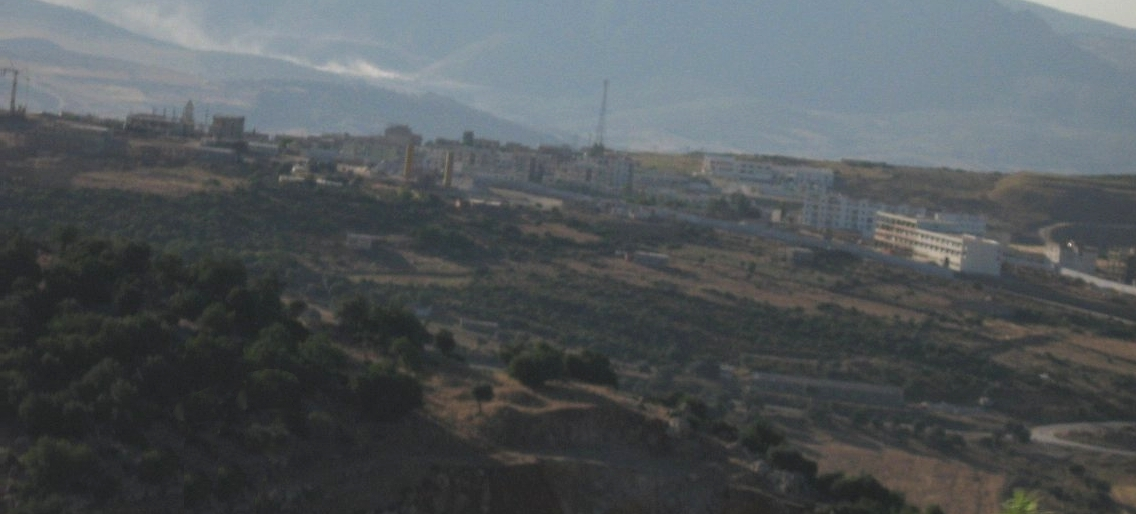
Ben Djerrah
