= Aïn Hessania =

Coordinates: 36°24′58″N 7°17′10″E

Houari Boumediene Aïn Hessania
- Commune and town
- Interactive map of Houari Boumediene
- Country: Algeria
- Province: Guelma Province

Population (1998)
  - Total: 6,371
- Time zone: UTC+1 (CET)

Houari Boumediene is a town and commune in Guelma Province, Algeria. According to the 1998 census it has a population of 6,371.
