= Bouchegouf =

Bouchegouf بوشقوف
- Commune and town
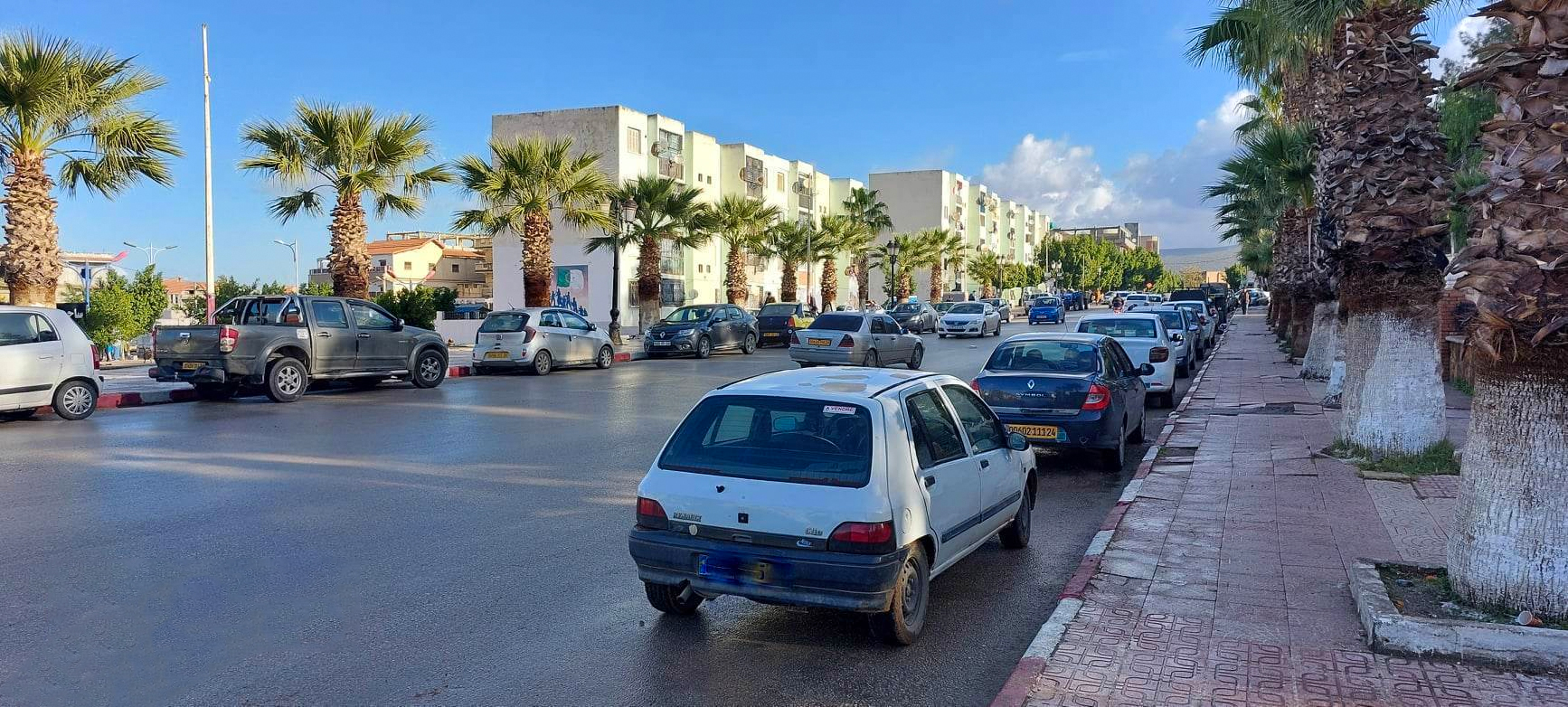

- Location within Algeria
- Coordinates: 36°28′N 7°29′E
- Country: Algeria
- Province: Guelma Province
- District: Bouchegouf District

Population (2022)
  - Total: 30,428
- Time zone: UTC+1 (CET)
- Postal code: 24002

Bouchegouf is a town and commune in Guelma Province, Algeria. According to the 2022 census it has a population of 30,428.
