= Djeballah Khemissi =

Djeballah Khemissi جبالة لخميسي
- Commune and town

- Location within Algeria
- Coordinates: 36°27′52″N 7°34′08″E
- Country: Algeria
- Province: Guelma Province
- District: Guelaât Bou Sbaâ District

Population (2008)
  - Total: 4,487
- Time zone: UTC+1 (CET)

Djeballah Khemissi is a town and commune in Guelma Province, Algeria. According to the 1998 census it has a population of 3870.
