= Taïeb Boulahrouf =

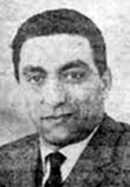
- Born: 9 April 1923; Oued Zenati, Guelma
- Died: 26 June 2005 (aged 82)
- Occupation: Politician

Taïeb Boulahrouf (9 April 1923 – 26 June 2005) was an Algerian politician and militant nationalist during the Algerian war of independence.

== Birth and youth ==
Boulahrouf was born on 9 April 1923 in the region of Oued Zenati (Guelma). He grew up in a family of modest means, undertook his studies at Annaba, but did not have the time to continue his schooling after being dismissed from school during the first cycle.

== Early years ==
Boulahrouf was also a reader of al-Umma newspaper, organ of the Star of North Africa party, and contributed to the formation of the first groups of Muslim Scouts in the region of Annaba. He also participated in organizing a demonstration of solidarity with the Tunisian Destour Party and was first arrested in 1938. As soon as the Algerian People's Party was dissolved, Boulahrouf's activity took place underground and he worked to broaden the grassroots of the party dissolved. He participated in the founding of the Movement of Friends of the Manifesto and Liberty. He was one of the organizers of the events of May 8, 1945, which earned him to be arrested again to be released after the proclamation of amnesty for political prisoners.

On leaving prison, Boulahrouf participated with his companions in the creation of the Special Organisation in which it was designated as responsible for the area encompassing Annaba, Skikda, Ain Beida. In 1948 he was arrested for the third time and imprisoned in Barbarossa where he undertook a hunger strike, demanding the political rights of Algerian nationalists. In 1949 he was appointed a member of the central committee of the Movement for the Triumph of Democratic Freedoms. Following the discovery of the Special Organization, he was arrested and then released in 1951. He joined the Federation of the party in France in the company of M'hamed Yazid in 1952 and there, he took the leadership of the newspaper "Free Algeria", organ of the Federation. When the crisis broke MTLD, he opposed Messali el Hadj and, on charges of violating the external security of the French state, he was arrested in early 1954 and was released only August 1954.

== Political and Military activism ==
At the outbreak of the Revolution, Boulahrouf was in France and joined the ranks of the Front as part of the Federation of France's National Liberation Front to publicize and disseminate the objectives and principles of the Revolution with the French public opinion. To this end, He worked to establish contacts with communist personalities in France, trying to obtain the support of the Communist Party of France, but he failed in his efforts. He also collaborated in the Journal of the Algerian resistance in France and Switzerland.

Under the Provisional Government he had to take several missions. He was therefore appointed representative of the FLN in Rome and Geneva, where he played an important role in preliminary contacts with the French authorities. These contacts were crowned by the agreements of Evian, where he was involved during the different stages, from the secret contacts in Geneva in 1961 until the signing of definitive agreements on March 18, 1962.
