= Hammam Maskhoutine =

Thermal complex in Hammam Debagh, Algeria

- حمام المسخوطين
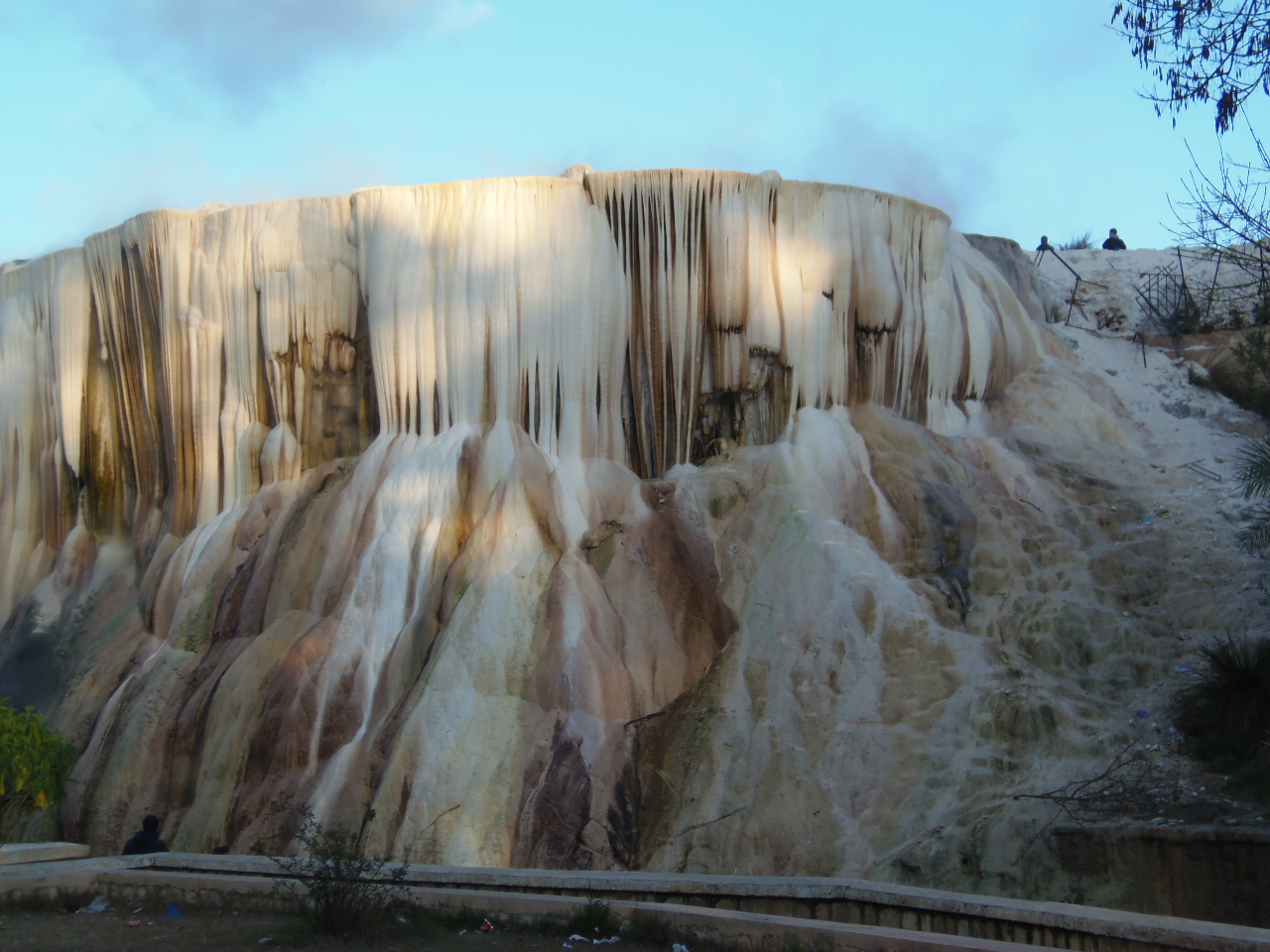

- Location within Algeria
- Interactive map of Hammam Maskhoutine
- Name origin: Arabic
- Location: Hammam Debagh, Guelma Province, Algeria
- Coordinates: 36.4613°N 7.2637°E
- Type: hot spring
- Temperature: Up to 98 °C (208 °F)

Hammam Maskhoutine (Arabic: حمام المسخوطين, English: "bath of the damned") is a thermal complex located in Hammam Debagh, of Guelma Province, Algeria. The dramatic, multicolored travertine walls of the spring have attracted attention from locals and tourists alike since the era of the Roman Empire.

Hammam Maskhoutine is the historical name for this general area, also used to refer to the hot springs and the legend that named the town. Hammam Dbegh is the official name of the town itself, and Hammam Chellala is the name of the thermal complex and cascade.

== History ==
During the Roman occupation, the town was called Aquae Thiblitanae, due to its proximity to Thibilis. The bath facilities installed by the Romans at the spring can still be used today.

The Arabic name of the town comes from a local legend in which a man married his sister. As the wedding procession, including the incestuous couple, moved up the valley, a curse caused the skies to darken, and the entire wedding party was struck with lightning and turned to stone. The billowing shapes of the Hammam Maskhoutine spring are said to come from the still-frozen wedding party and their celebratory robes.

== Hot springs ==
Hammam Maskhoutine is actually a group of 10 different hot springs in a single valley. The temperature of the water in the springs can be as hot as 98 °C (208 °F); it is possible to boil eggs in the outflow channels. The overall flow rate of the thermal complex is 1,650 liters per second: nearly 100,000 liters per minute.

The water is saturated with minerals such as iron and calcium carbonate. These minerals, as well as the heat, have been regarded as therapeutic for sufferers of ailments such as rheumatism and arthritis.

The site also features numerous conoid formations.

== Gallery ==
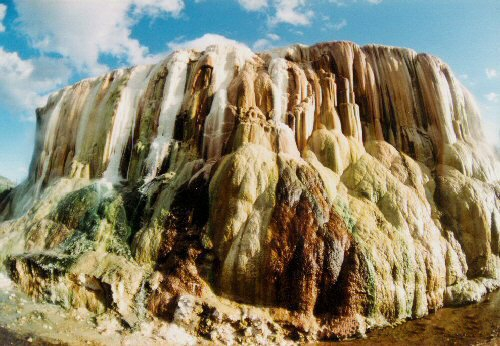
Side view of the hot springs

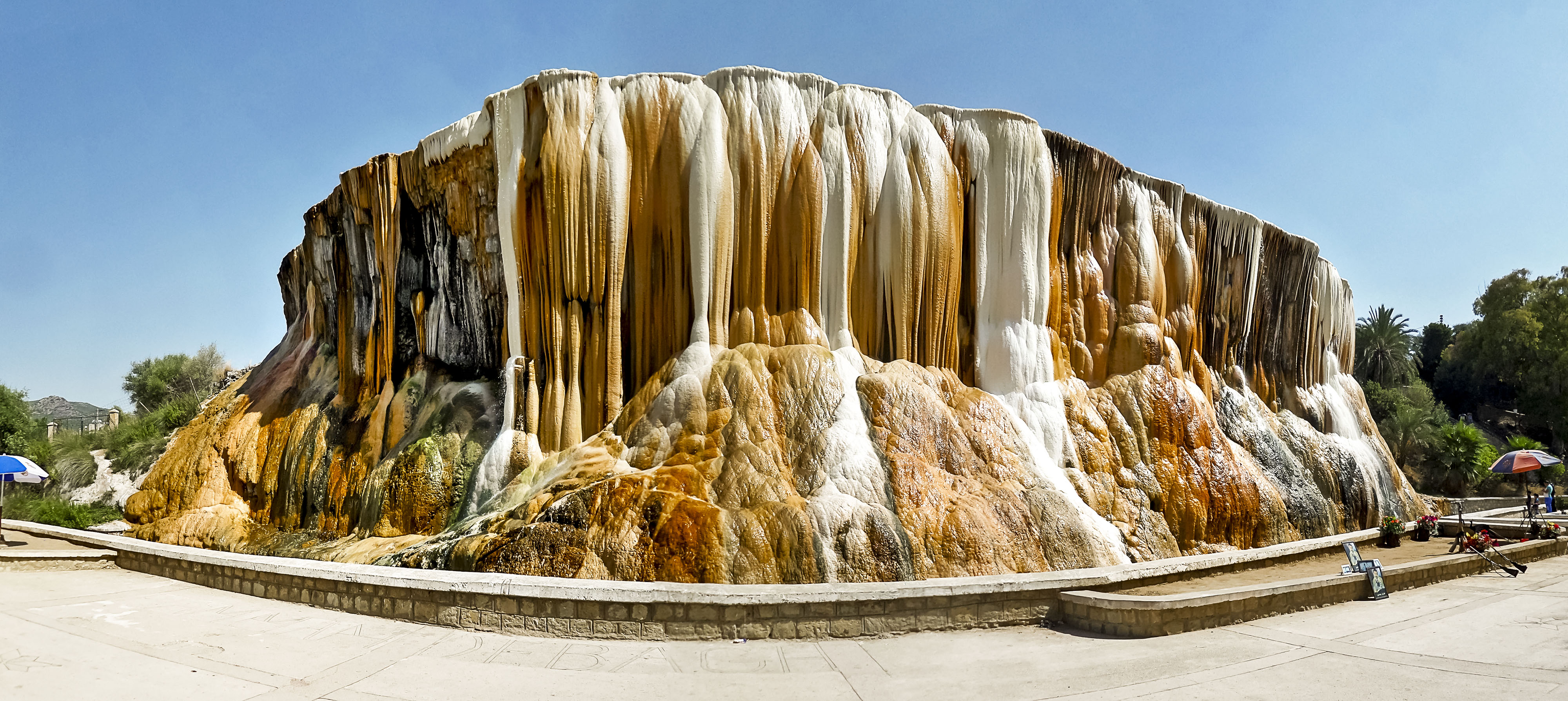
Another view of the springs

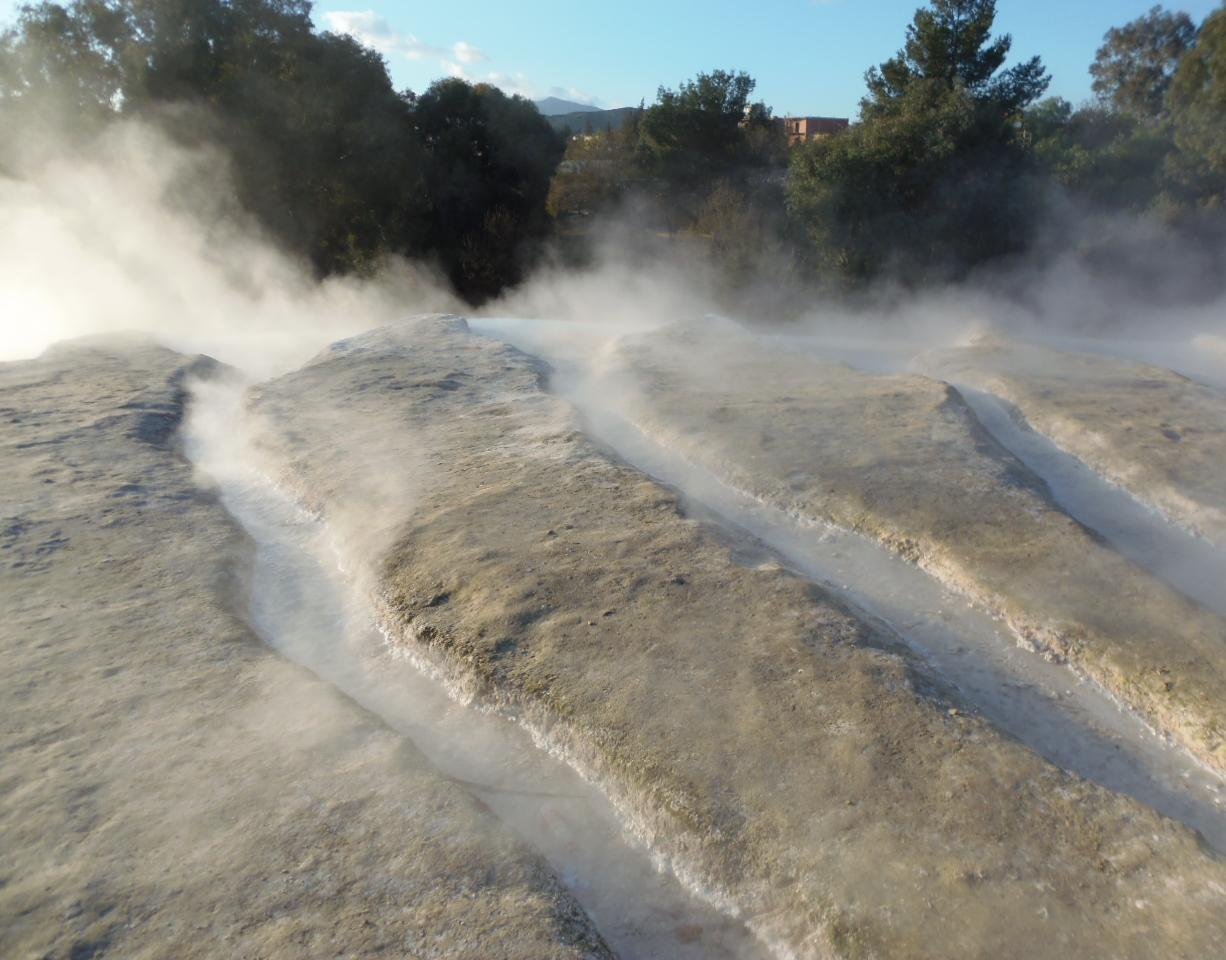
Source and flowing channels of the hot spring

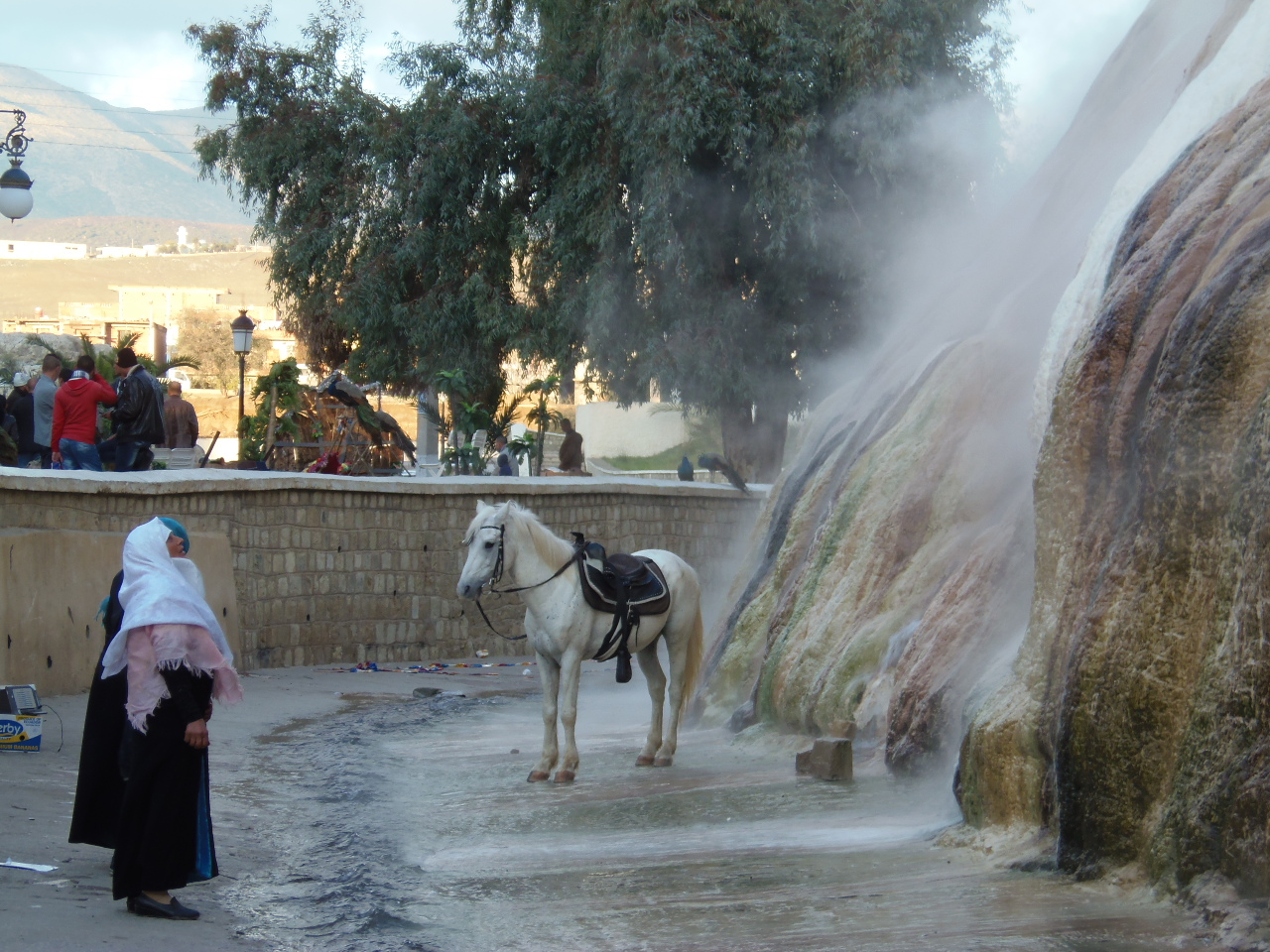
People beneath the cascade

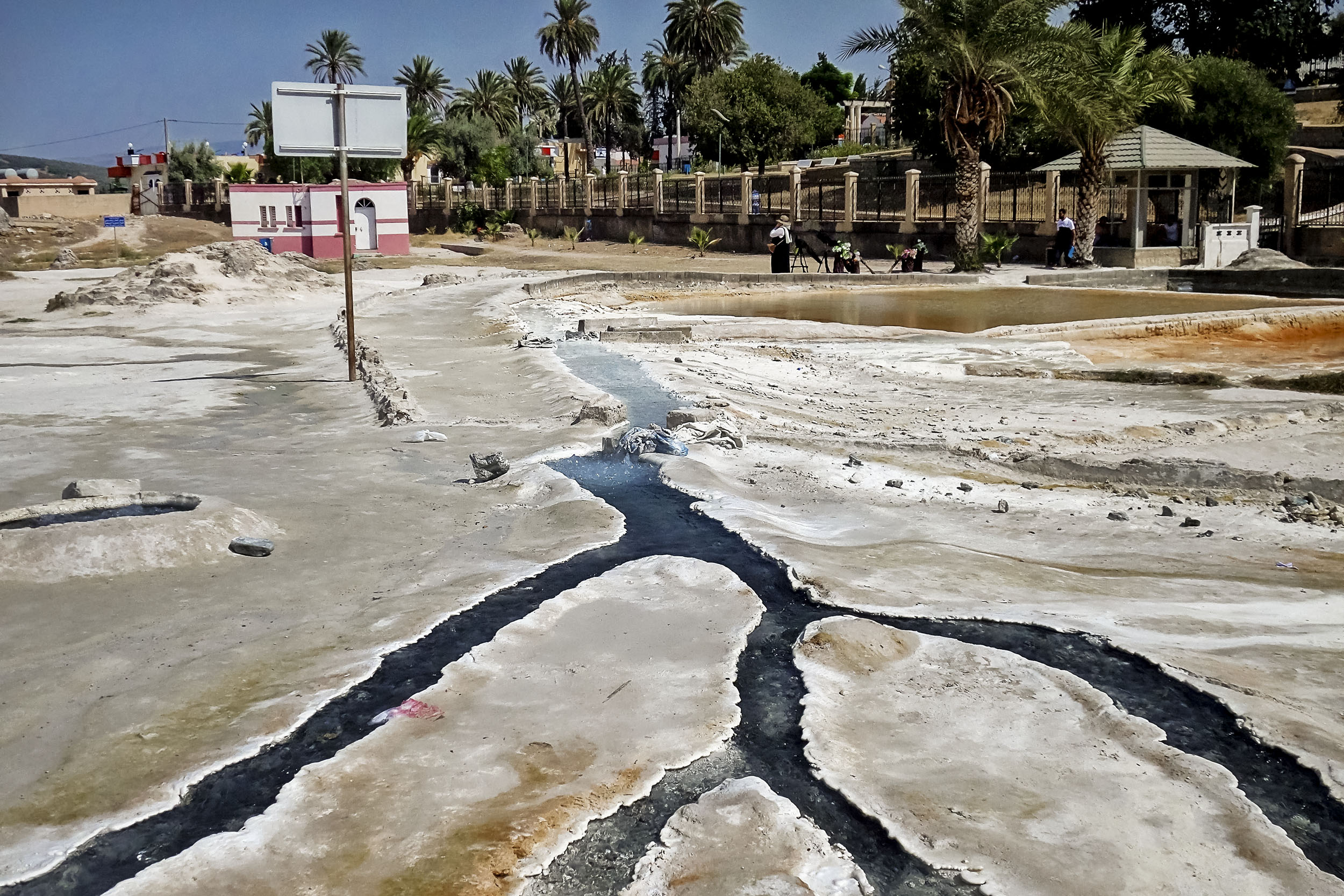
Hot spring channels with view of part of the town

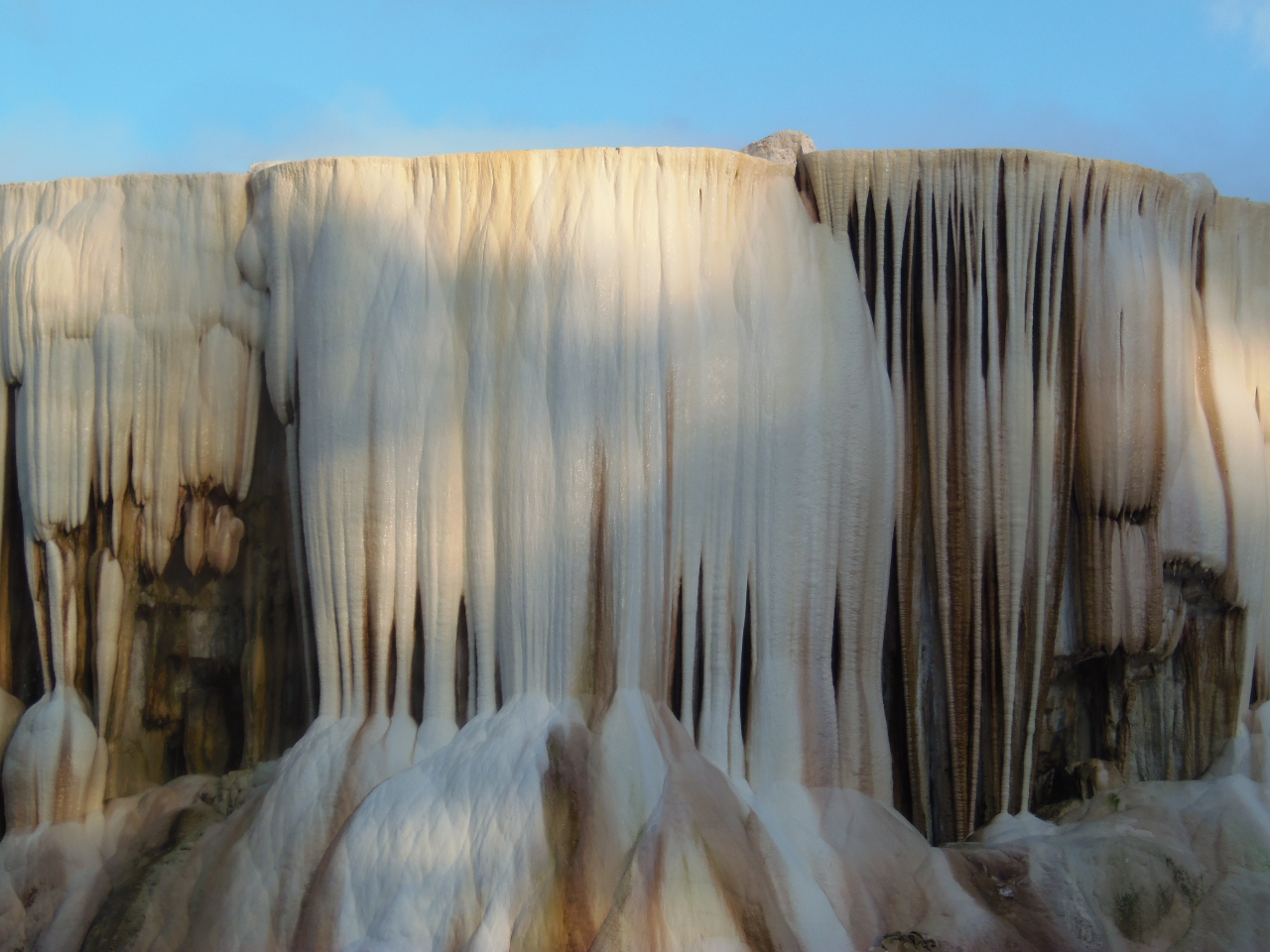
Closer view of the flowing travertine formations

== See also ==
- List of cultural assets of Algeria
