= Hammam Debagh =

- Commune and town
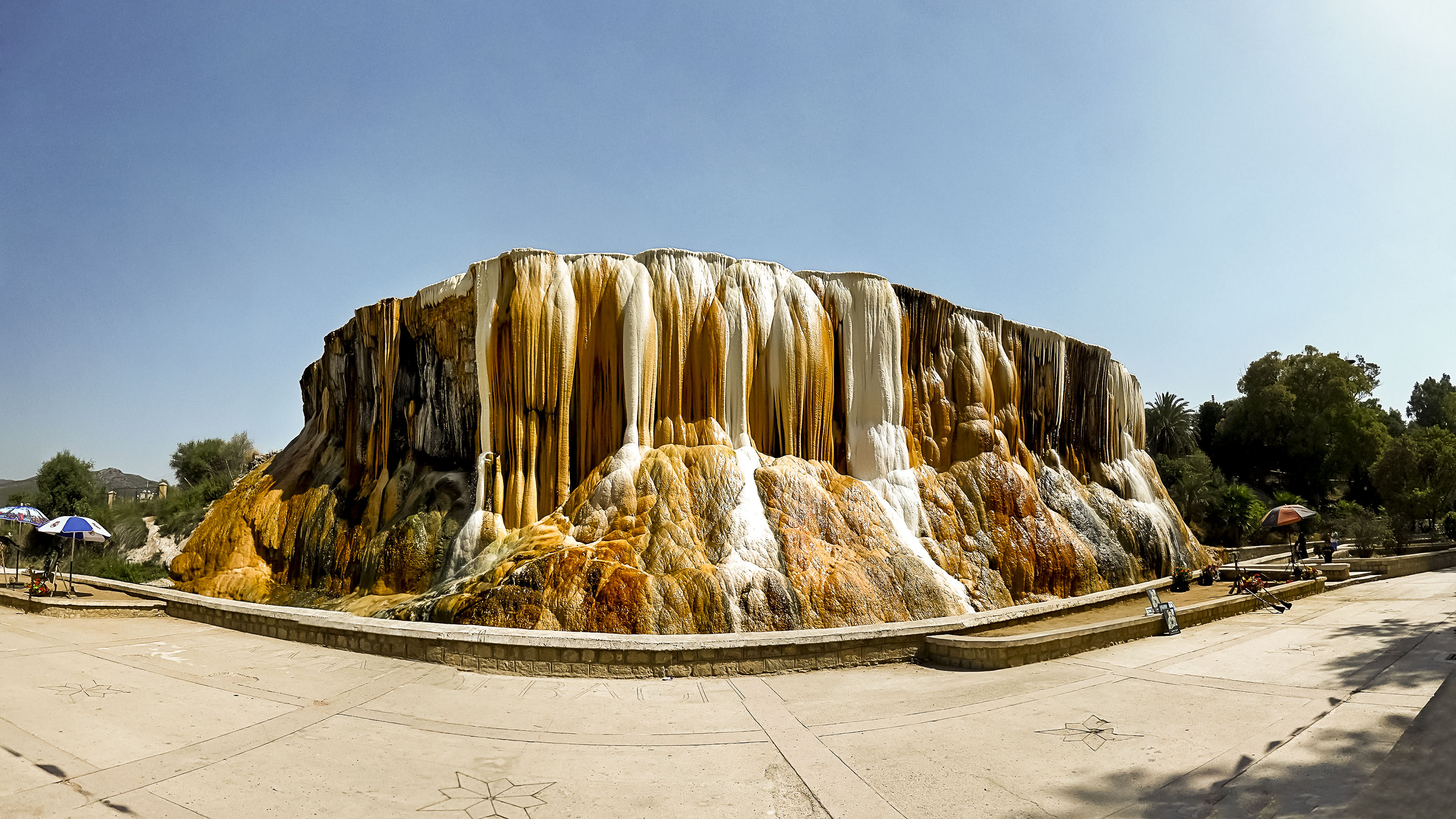

- Location within Algeria
- Coordinates: 36°27′40″N 7°16′00″E
- Country: Algeria
- Province: Guelma Province
- District: Hammam Debagh District

Population (2008)
  - Total: 16,391
- Time zone: UTC+1 (CET)

Hammam Debagh is a town and commune in Guelma Province, Algeria. It is the district seat of Hammam Debagh District and the location of the famous Hammam Maskhoutine thermal complex.
