= Medjez Amar =

Medjez Amar مجاز عمار
- Commune and town
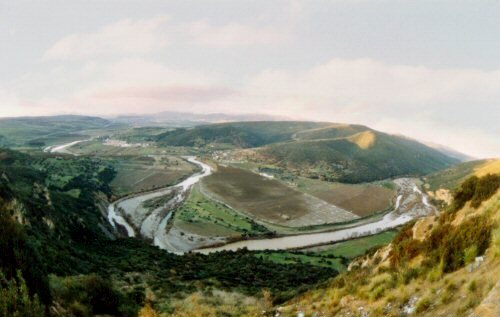

- Location within Algeria
- Coordinates: 36°26′43″N 7°18′38″E
- Country: Algeria
- Province: Guelma Province
- District: Houari Boumédienne District

Population (2008)
  - Total: 7,703
- Time zone: UTC+1 (CET)

Medjez Amar is a town and commune in Guelma Province, Algeria. According to the 1998 census it has a population of 6,426.
