= Bordj Sabat =

Coordinates: 36°24′11″N 7°02′44″E

- Commune and town
- Interactive map of Bordj Sabat
- Country: Algeria
- Province: Guelma Province

Population (1998)
  - Total: 10,079
- Time zone: UTC+1 (CET)

Bordj Sabat is a town and commune in Guelma Province, Algeria. According to the 1998 census it has a population of 10,079.

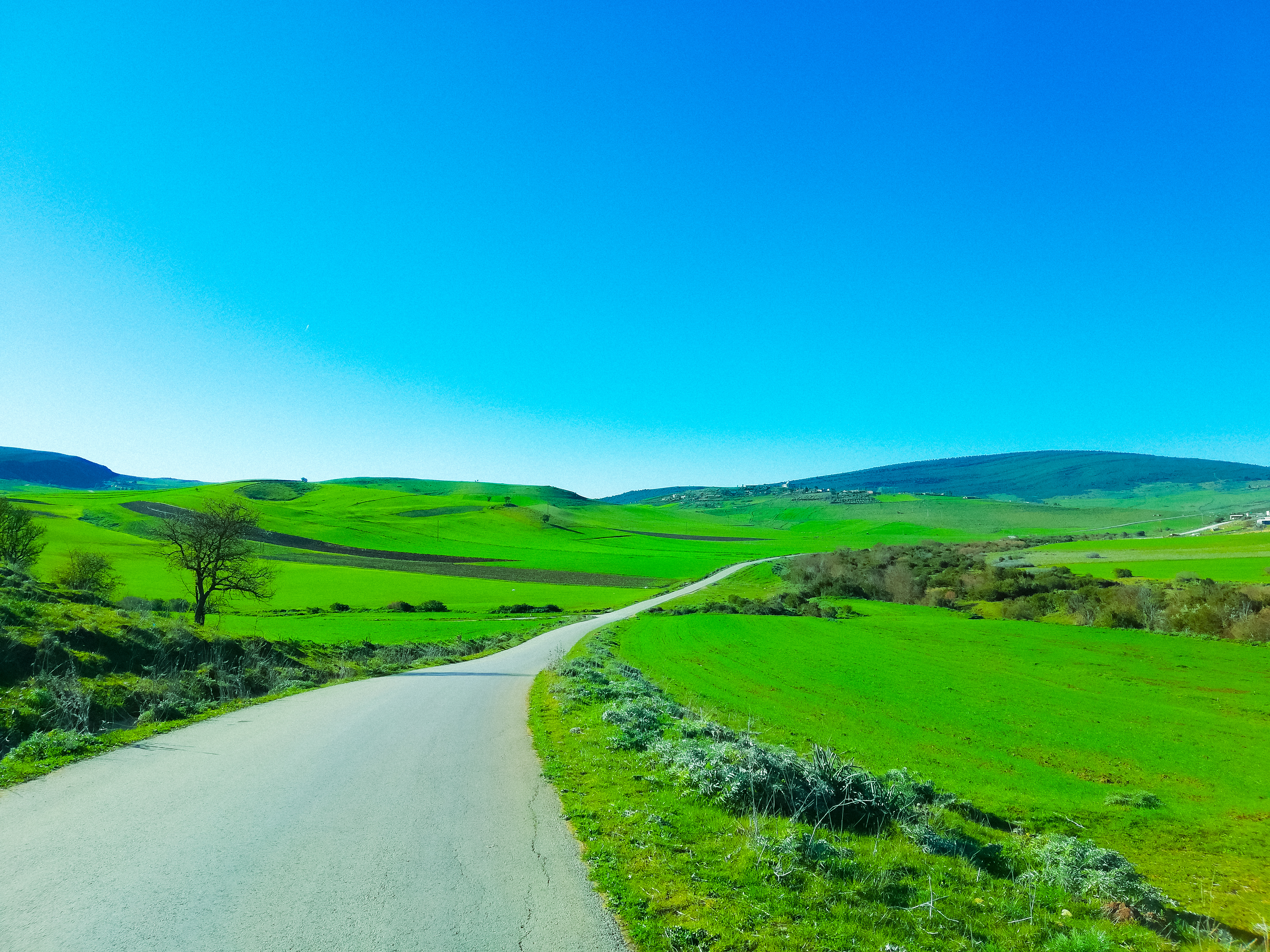

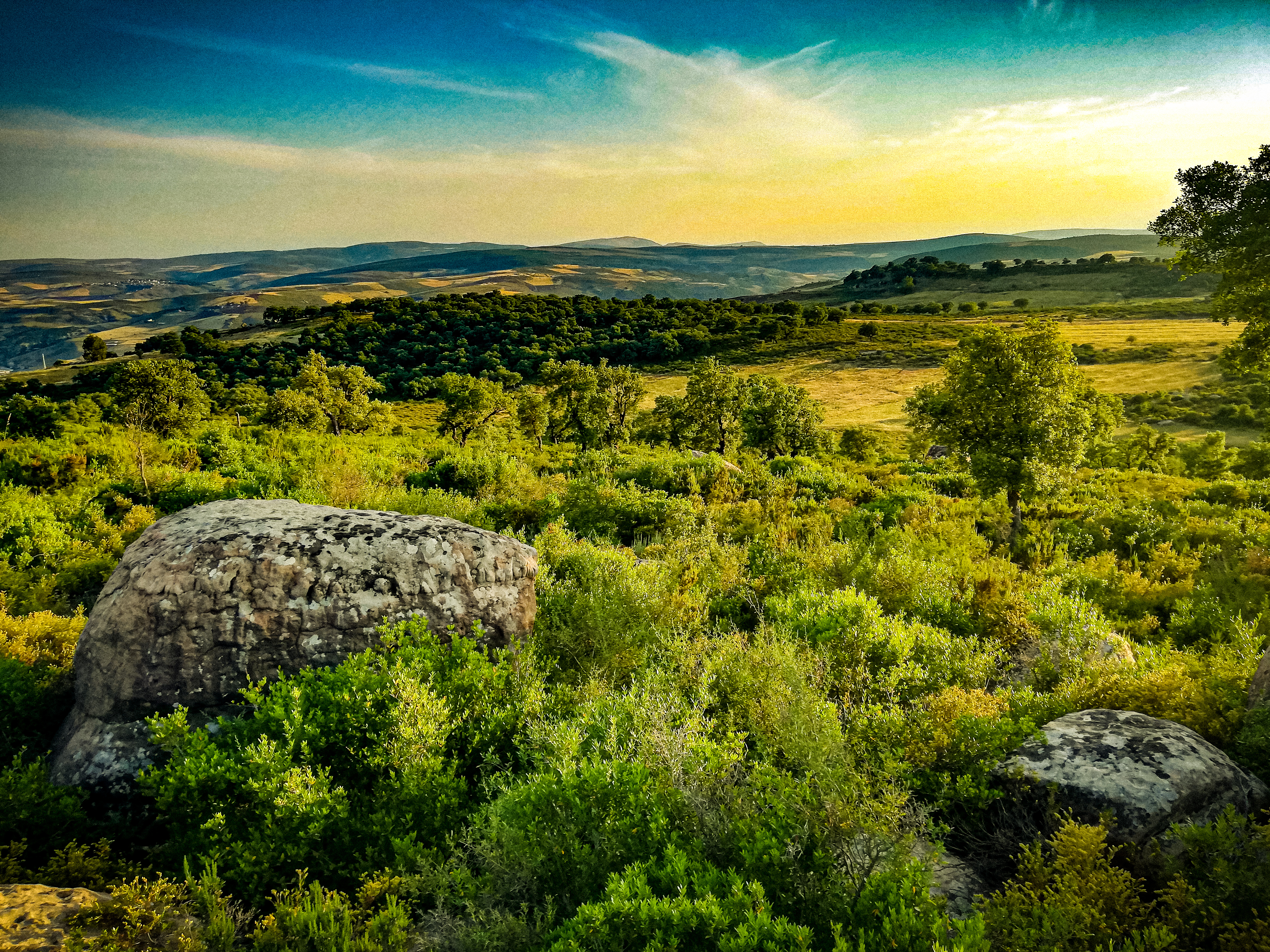
Larebaa beni medjaled, Bordj Sabath, Guelma
