= Dahouara =

Coordinates: 36°21′06″N 7°43′58″E

- Commune and town
- Interactive map of Dahouara
- Country: Algeria
- Province: Guelma Province

Population (1998)
  - Total: 7,791
- Time zone: UTC+1 (CET)

Dahouara is a town and commune in Guelma Province, Algeria. According to the 1998 census it has a population of 7791.
