= Bou Hachana =

Coordinates: 36°18′23″N 7°30′30″E

- Commune and town
- Interactive map of Bou Hachana
- Country: Algeria
- Province: Guelma Province

Population (1998)
  - Total: 5,575
- Time zone: UTC+1 (CET)

Bou Hachana is a town and commune in Guelma Province, Algeria. According to the 1998 census it has a population of 5575.
