= Oued Zenati =

Coordinates: 36°19′N 7°10′E

- Commune and town
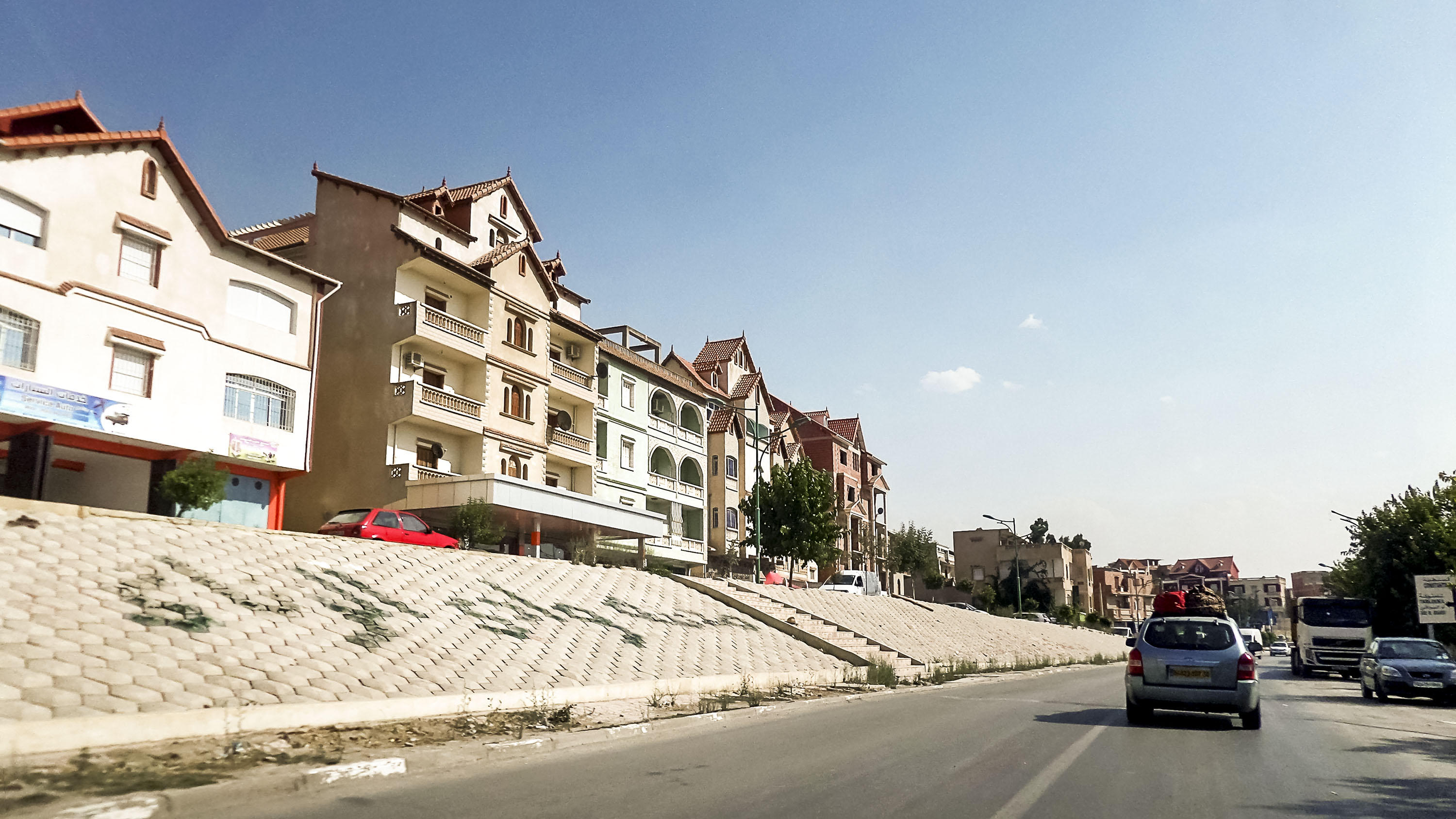

- Location within Algeria
- Country: Algeria
- Province: Guelma Province

Population (2008)
  - Total: 32,870
- Time zone: UTC+1 (CET)

Oued Zenati is a town and commune in Guelma Province, Algeria. According to the 1998 census, it had a population of 27,254, which increased to 55,000 in 2010.

== History ==
During the Numidian era (399BC-50BC), the region was highly cultivated and protected by military points spread throughout the region, still present today.

The town's Early African Christian history is portrayed in the Eloa statue in the town agora. Eloa, the angel of sorrow and compassion in Christian Mythology is said to have been born from a tear Jesus shed. In Alfred de Vigny's poem Eloa, we find Jesus at Lazarus' grave. He is deeply moved by the grief of Martha and Mary after losing their brother. So he sheds one heavenly tear, and Eloa is born.

== Geography ==
It is located 40 km (to the west) from Guelma, 110 km from Annaba and 70 km from Constantine. Oued Zenati is also the name of a river in the commune. The village has an agricultural economy, but little industry.

== Related people ==
- Taïeb Boulahrouf an Algerian politician, born in 1923
