= Aïn Larbi =

Coordinates: 36°15′57″N 7°23′52″E

- Commune and town
- Interactive map of Aïn Larbi
- Country: Algeria
- Province: Guelma Province

Population (1998)
  - Total: 7,756
- Time zone: UTC+1 (CET)

Aïn Larbi is a town and commune in Guelma Province, Algeria. According to the 1998 census it has a population of 7,756.
