= Nechmaya =

Coordinates: 36°36′41″N 7°30′48″E

- Commune and town
- Interactive map of Nechmaya
- Country: Algeria
- Province: Guelma Province

Population (1998)
  - Total: 9,113
- Time zone: UTC+1 (CET)

Nechmaya is a town and commune in Guelma Province, Algeria. According to the 1998 census it has a population of 9,113.
