= Aïn Sandel =

Coordinates: 36°14′41″N 7°30′45″E

- Commune and town
- Interactive map of Aïn Sandel
- Country: Algeria
- Province: Guelma Province

Population (1998)
  - Total: 5,083
- Time zone: UTC+1 (CET)

Aïn Sandel is a town and commune in Guelma Province, Algeria. According to the 1998 census it has a population of 5,083.
