= Belkheir =

Coordinates: 36°28′N 7°29′E

- Commune and town
- Interactive map of Belkheir
- Country: Algeria
- Province: Guelma Province
- Elevation: 715 ft (218 m)

Population (1998)
  - Total: 14,979
- Time zone: UTC+1 (CET)
- Postal code: 24015

Belkheir is a town and commune in Guelma Province, Algeria. According to the 2008 census it has a population of 17,649.
