= Aïn Ben Beida =

Coordinates: 36°37′04″N 7°41′43″E

- Commune and town
- Interactive map of Aïn Ben Beida
- Country: Algeria
- Province: Guelma Province

Population (1998)
  - Total: 8,269
- Time zone: UTC+1 (CET)

Aïn Ben Beida is a town and commune in Guelma Province, Algeria. According to the 1998 census it has a population of 8,269.
