= Guelma District =

Guelma District دائرة قالمة
- District
- Map of Guelma Province highlighting the district

- Location of district in Algeria map
- Country: Algeria
- Province: Guelma
- District seat: Guelma

Population (1998)
  - Total: 114,663
- Time zone: UTC+01 (CET)
- Municipalities: 2

Guelma District is an Algerian district in Guelma Province, in northeastern Algeria.

The district was named after its capital city, Guelma, which is also the capital of the province.

The district has several ancient Roman archaeological sites.

== Municipalities ==
The district is further divided into 2 municipalities, which is the lowest number per district subdivision in the province:

- Guelma Municipality — capital city.
- Ben Djerrah Municipality
