= Bou Hamdane =

- Commune and town

- Location within Algeria
- Country: Algeria
- Province: Guelma Province

Population (1998)
  - Total: 4,517
- Time zone: UTC+1 (CET)

Bou Hamdane is a town and commune in Guelma Province, Algeria. According to the 1998 census it has a population of 4517.
