= Oued Cheham =

Coordinates: 36°23′N 7°46′E

- Commune and town
- Interactive map of Oued Cheham
- Country: Algeria
- Province: Guelma Province

Population (1998)
  - Total: 11,795
- Time zone: UTC+1 (CET)

Oued Cheham is a town and commune in Guelma Province, Algeria. According to the 1998 census it has a population of 11,795.
