= Aïn Makhlouf =

Aïn Makhlouf عين مخلوف
- Commune and town
- Location of Aïn Makhlouf within Guelma Province

- Location of Aïn Makhlouf within Algeria
- Country: Algeria
- Province: Guelma Province

Population (1998)
  - Total: 11,018
- Time zone: UTC+1 (CET)

Aïn Makhlouf is a town and commune in Guelma Province, Algeria. According to the 1998 census, it had a population of 11,018.

Ain Makhlouf, also known as عين مخلوف and formerly as Renier, is in Wilaya Guelma at 36 ° 14 '36 " north, 7 ° 15 '03 " east.

The population is 11 018 in 2002 people.

Aïn Makhlouf is located on the Berber coastal plain at an altitude of 800 meters, and although generally of Mediterranean climate, snow is known to fall in winter.
