= Aïn Reggada =

Coordinates: 36°15′34″N 7°04′26″E

- Commune and town
- Interactive map of Aïn Reggada
- Country: Algeria
- Province: Guelma Province

Population (1998)
  - Total: 7,289
- Time zone: UTC+1 (CET)

Aïn Reggada is a town and commune in Guelma Province, Algeria. According to the 1998 census it has a population of 7,289.
