= Ras El Agba =

Coordinates: 36°22′23″N 7°13′24″E

- Commune and town
- Interactive map of Ras El Agba
- Country: Algeria
- Province: Guelma Province

Population (1998)
  - Total: 2,348
- Time zone: UTC+1 (CET)

Ras El Agba is a town and commune in the Guelma Province of Algeria. According to the 1998 census it has a population of 2,348.
