= El Fedjoudj =

Coordinates: 36°31′N 7°24′E

El Fedjoudj, Guelma, Algeria
- Commune and town
- Interactive map of El Fedjoudj, Guelma, Algeria
- Country: Algeria
- Province: Guelma Province

Population (1998)
  - Total: 7,473
- Time zone: UTC+1 (CET)

El Fedjoudj is a town and commune in Guelma Province, Algeria. According to the 1998 census it has a population of 7,473.
