= Sellaoua Announa =

Coordinates: 36°23′13″N 7°15′02″E

- Commune and town
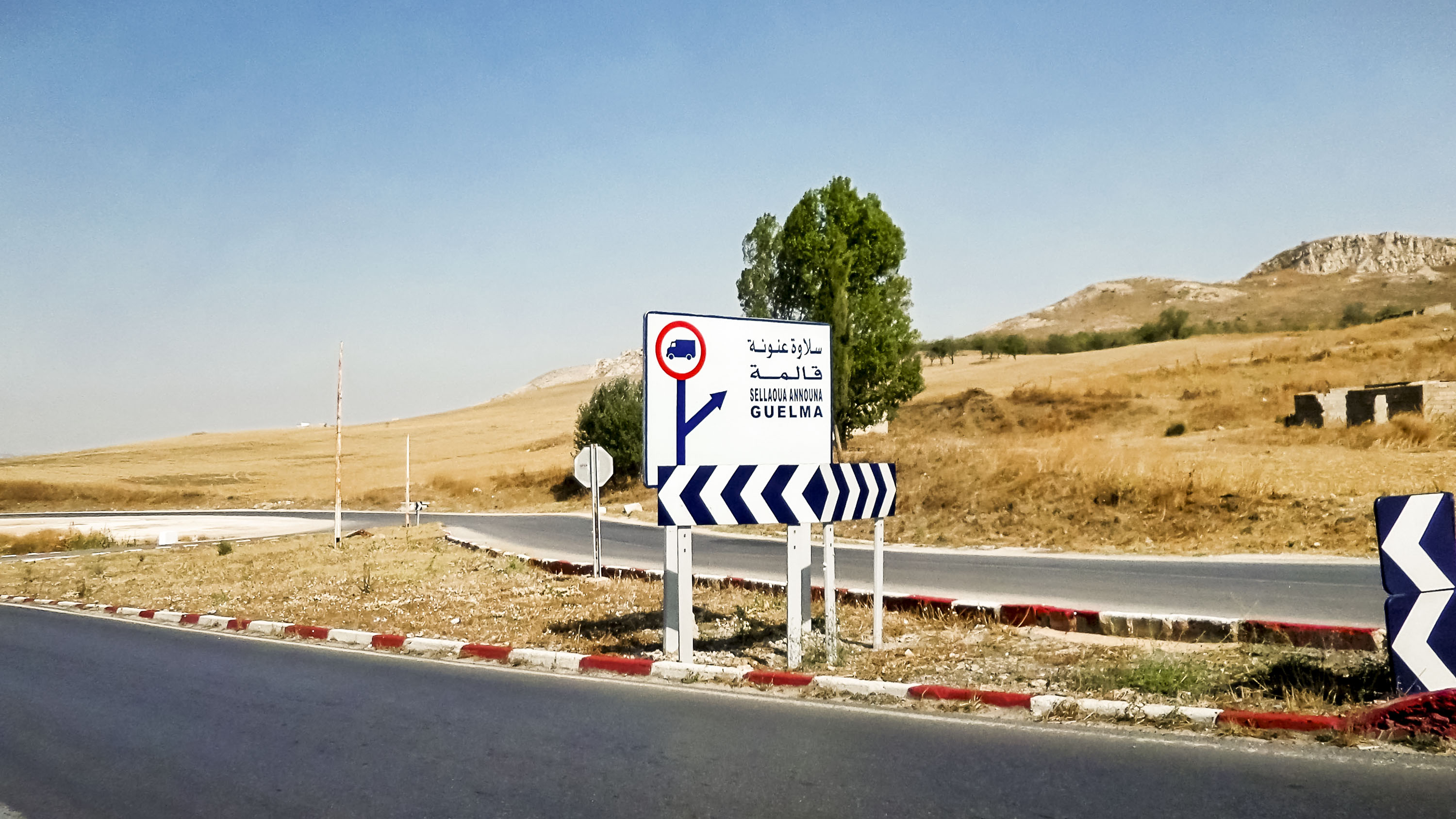
- Interactive map of Sellaoua Announa
- Country: Algeria
- Province: Guelma Province
- Time zone: UTC+1 (CET)

Sellaoua Announa is a town and commune in Guelma Province, Algeria. It was called Thibilis during the Roman Empire.
