= Khezara =

Coordinates: 36°22′10″N 7°31′45″E

Kheraza
- Commune and town
- Interactive map of Kheraza
- Country: Algeria
- Province: Guelma Province

Population (1998)
  - Total: 8,154
- Time zone: UTC+1 (CET)

Kheraza is a town and commune in Guelma Province, Algeria. According to the 1998 census it has a population of 8,154.
