= Medjez Sfa =

Coordinates: 36°27′N 7°46′E

- Commune and town
- Interactive map of Medjez Sfa
- Country: Algeria
- Province: Guelma Province

Population (1998)
  - Total: 7,561
- Time zone: UTC+1 (CET)

Medjez Sfa is a town and commune in Guelma Province, Algeria. According to the 1998 census it has a population of 7,561.
