= Roknia =

Archaeological site in Algeria

- Commune and town
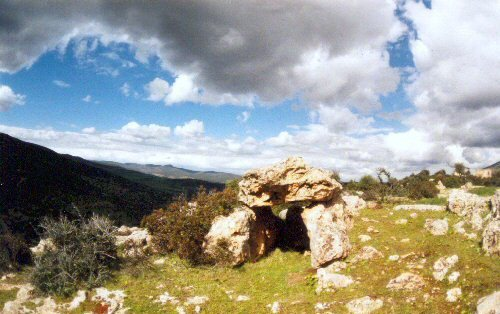

- Location within Algeria
- Country: Algeria
- Province: Guelma Province

Population (1998)
  - Total: 7,791
- Time zone: UTC+1 (CET)

Roknia is a necropolis in the Guelma region of north-east Algeria consisting of more than 7000 dolmens spread over an area of 2 km.

== See also ==
- Megalith
