= Oued Fragha =

Coordinates: 36°33′21″N 7°42′47″E

- Commune and town
- Interactive map of Oued Fragha
- Country: Algeria
- Province: Guelma Province

Population (1998)
  - Total: 6,636
- Time zone: UTC+1 (CET)

Oued Fragha is a town and commune in Guelma Province, Algeria. According to the 1998 census it has a population of 6,636.
