= Abdallah Baali =

Algerian career diplomat

Abdallah Baali (born 19 October 1954) is an Algerian career diplomat. Baali was born in Guelma, Algeria. After he graduated from the Ecole nationale d'administration in 1977, he joined the Ministry of Foreign Affairs. He served as a counsellor at the Permanent Mission of Algeria to the United Nations from 1982 to 1989. From 1989 to 1992, he served as the Adviser to the Minister and Spokesman for the Ministry of Foreign Affairs.

He was the Ambassador of Algeria to Indonesia, Australia, New Zealand and Brunei from 1992 to 1996 and Permanent Representative to the United Nations from 1996 to 2005. He was Permanent Representative of Algeria to the United Nations Security Council from 2004 to 2005 and President of the United Nations Security Council in December 2004. He has led Algerian delegations to various international conferences and to conferences on disarmament and on the Non-Proliferation Treaty. He chaired several UN bodies and was President of the 6th NPT Review Conference (New York, 2000).

He was appointed as Ambassador to the United States in 2008. His Ambassadorship ended in September 2020. He has published various articles pertaining to the 1996 Algerian Constitution, nuclear disarmament and the 2000 NPT Review Conference. He lectured in several American universities.

Baali is married, with two children. He speaks Arabic, French, English, Spanish and Indonesian. He’s a member of the Cosmos Club and the Georgetown Club of Washington DC.
