= Beni Mezline =

Coordinates: 36°28′51″N 7°36′11″E

- Commune and town
- Interactive map of Beni Mezline
- Country: Algeria
- Province: Guelma Province

Population (1998)
  - Total: 4,491
- Time zone: UTC+1 (CET)

Beni Mezline is a town and commune in Guelma Province, Algeria. According to the 1998 census it has a population of 4491.
