= Guelaât Bou Sbaâ =

Coordinates: 36°32′45″N 7°28′31″E

- Commune and town
- Interactive map of Guelaât Bou Sbaâ
- Country: Algeria
- Province: Guelma Province
- Time zone: UTC+1 (CET)

Guelaât Bou Sbaâ is a town and commune in Guelma Province, Algeria.
