= Boumahra Ahmed =

Coordinates: 36°27′N 7°31′E

- Commune and town
- Interactive map of Boumahra Ahmed
- Country: Algeria
- Province: Guelma Province

Population (1998)
  - Total: 15,273
- Time zone: UTC+1 (CET)

Boumahra Ahmed is a town and commune in Guelma Province, Algeria. According to the 1998 census it has a population of 15,273.
