= Héliopolis, Algeria =

Héliopolis, Algeria ھيليوبوليس
- Commune and town
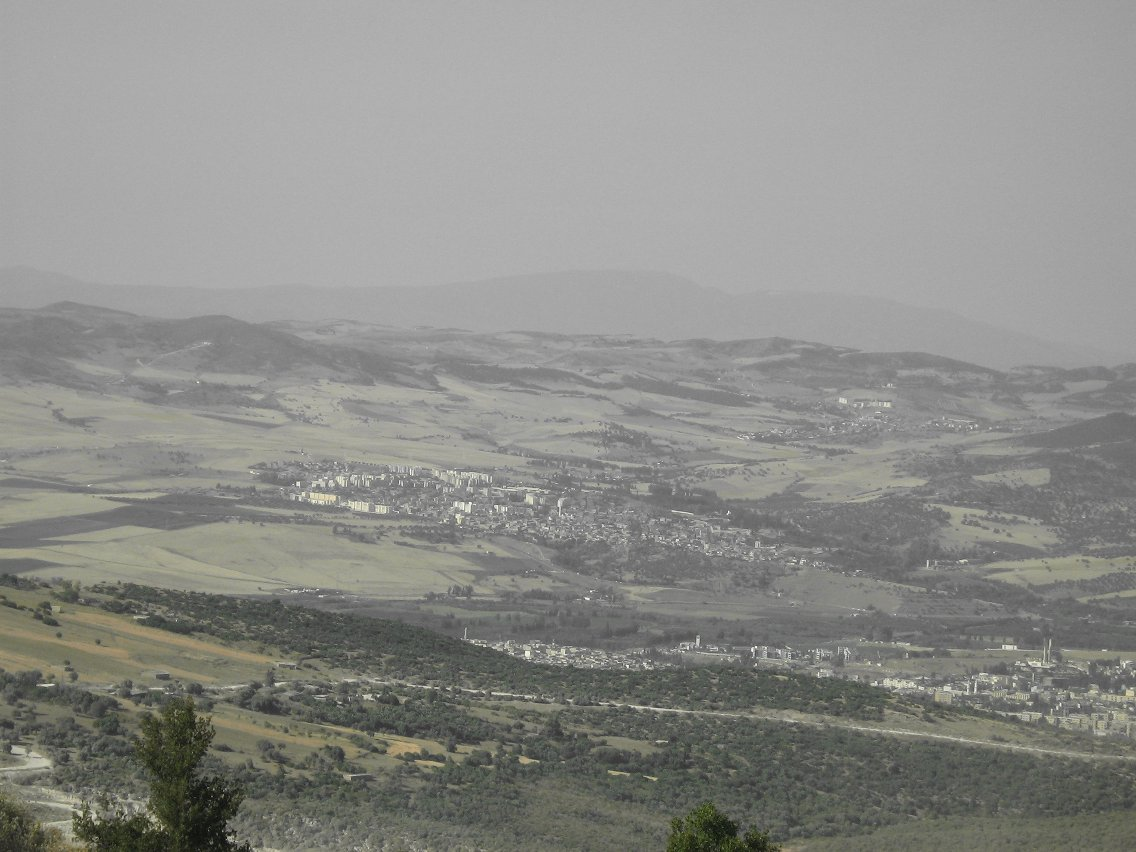

- Location within Algeria
- Coordinates: 36°30′10″N 7°26′41″E
- Country: Algeria
- Province: Guelma Province

Population (2008)
  - Total: 26,328
- Time zone: UTC+1 (CET)

Héliopolis, Algeria, is a town and commune in Guelma Province, Algeria. According to the 1998 census it has a population of 22,605.

== Name ==
The name of the town stems from the ancient Roman town on the same site. The name was derived from a famous, circular Roman pool which had the effect of reflecting the sun, hence the name Heliopolis meaning in the Greek language "City of the Sun".

== Geography ==
The terrain around Héliopolis is mainly hilly, but the southeast is flat. The highest point in the vicinity is 426 meters above sea level, 1.9 km northeast of the Héliopolis. The surrounding area is quite densely populated, with 129 inhabitants per square kilometers. The nearest city is Guelma, 4.8 km south of Héliopolis. The landscape around Héliopolis features an unusually high number of named mountains.

Mediterranean climate prevails in the region. The average annual temperature in the area is 19 °C. The warmest month is July when the average temperature is 32 °C and the coldest is January, with 8 °C. Average annual rainfall is 677 millimeters. The rainiest month is February, with an average of 108 mm of precipitation, and the driest is July, with 9 mm of rainfall.

== Climate ==
The climate is Mediterranean. The average temperature is 19 °C. The hottest month is July, at 32 °C, and the coldest is January, at 8 °C. The average rainfall is 677 millimetres per year. The wettest month is February, at 108 millimetres of rain, and the driest is July, at 9 millimetres.

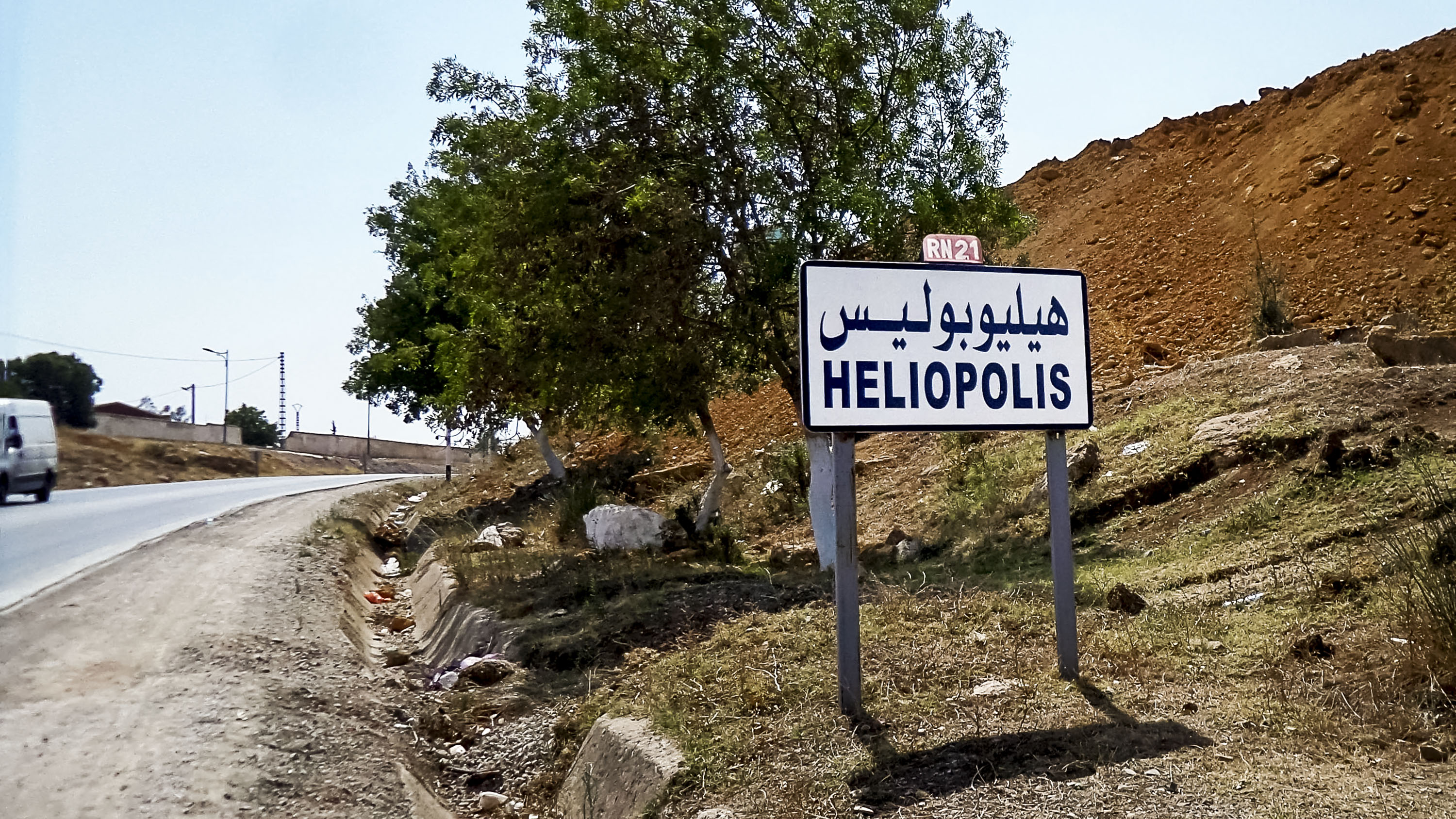
Héliopolis هيليوبوليس.
