= Bouati Mahmoud =

Coordinates: 36°35′N 7°20′E

- Commune and town
- Interactive map of Bouati Mahmoud
- Country: Algeria
- Province: Guelma Province

Population (1998)
  - Total: 8,823
- Time zone: UTC+1 (CET)

Mahmoud Bahaa is a town in North Algeria.
