= Hammam Nbail =

Coordinates: 36°19′33″N 7°38′37″E

- Commune and town
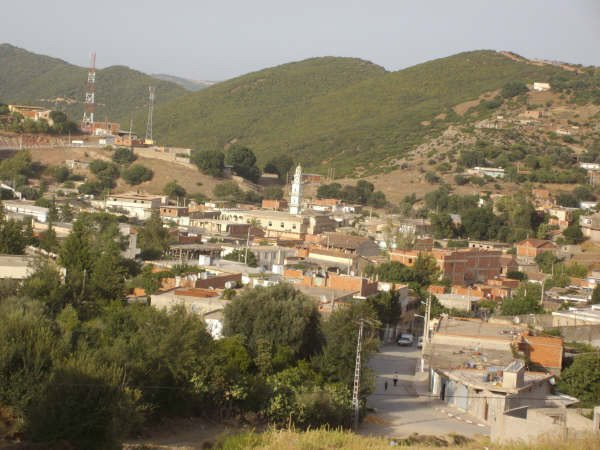
- Hammam N'bails
- Interactive map of Hammam Nbail
- Country: Algeria
- Province: Guelma Province

Population (1998)
  - Total: 15,854
- Time zone: UTC+1 (CET)

Hammam Nbail is a town and commune in Guelma Province, Algeria. According to the 1998 census it has a population of 15,854.
