= Guelma Province =

Province of Algeria

Guelma Province ولاية قالمة
- Province
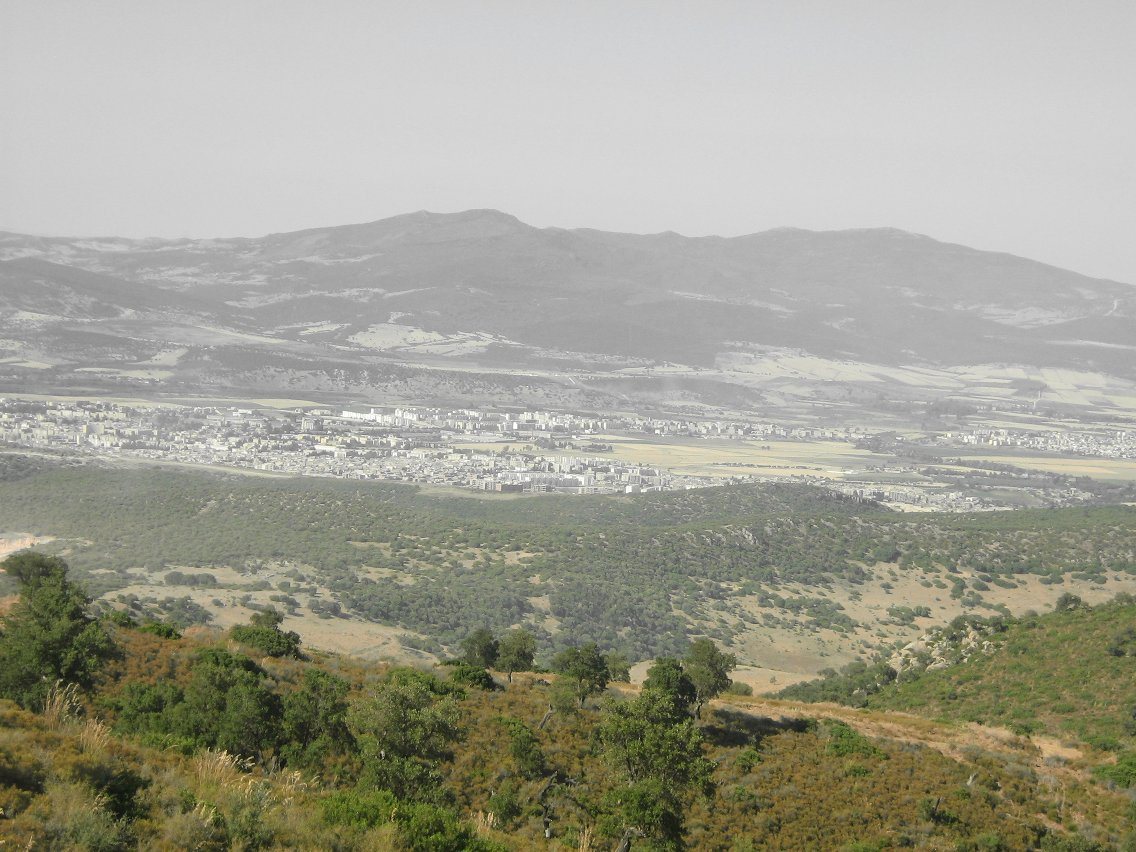
- Guelma Valley as seen from Ben Djerrah, partially showing the metropolitan area of Guelma with the cities of Boumahra Ahmed, Belkheir, and Guelma visible (from right to left/east to west)

- Map of Algeria highlighting Guelma
- Coordinates: 36°28′N 07°27′E
- Country: Algeria
- Capital: Guelma

Area
  - Total: 4,101 km^{2} (1,583 sq mi)

Population (2008)
  - Total: 482,261
  - Density: 117.6/km^{2} (304.6/sq mi)
- Time zone: UTC+01 (CET)
- Area Code: +213 (0) 37
- ISO 3166 code: DZ-24
- Districts: 10
- Municipalities: 34

Guelma Province (Arabic: ولاية قالمة) is a province (wilaya) in eastern Algeria. Its namesake is its seat and most populous municipality: Guelma.

== History ==
Its civilians suffered heavy casualties during the 1945 Sétif massacre by the French Army. The province itself was established in 1974 but before that, it was part of Annaba Province.

In 1984 El Taref Province and Souk Ahras Province were carved out of its territory.

== Demographics ==
It has 556,673 inhabitants as of 2024, one of the lower populations in the country, which gives it 39 seats in the APW, the province's assembly. The population density is 105 inhabitants per square kilometre (272/sq mi). Of these, 54.4% live in urban areas and 87% have access to safe drinking water, lower than the national average of 89%.. Of the active population of the province, 23.3% work in agriculture, 17.9% in construction, 9.9% in industry, and 48.9% in the services sector. 21.1% of the population is unemployed.]

== Geography ==
The territory of the province (4,101 km^{2} (1,583 sq mi)) is mainly composed of arable land (about 49%), which accounts for 1,890 km^{2} (730 sq mi); of this land, about 100 km^{2} (39 sq mi) is irrigated, and the rest is rainfed. In the area surrounding Guelma, around 130 km^{2} (50 sq mi) is irrigable, 110 km^{2} (42 sq mi) in the area between Oued Zenati and Tamlouka, and 20 km^{2} (8 sq mi) around Bouchegouf. Forests cover about 31% of the total area, which equals 0.9 km^{2} (0 sq mi), composed mainly of Aleppo pine, Algerian oak and Cork Oak. Areas dedicated for future industrial development, called activity zones in Algeria cover 2 km^{2} (1 sq mi).]

== Administrative divisions ==
The province is divided into 10 districts (daïras), which are further divided into 34 communes or municipalities.

=== Districts ===
1. Aïn Makhlouf
2. Bouchegouf
3. Guelaât Bou Sbaâ
4. Guelma
5. Hammam Debagh
6. Hammam N'Bails
7. Héliopolis
8. Houari Boumédienne
9. Khezaras
10. Oued Zenati

=== Communes ===
1. Aïn Ben Beida
2. Houari Boumediene
3. Aïn Larbi
4. Aïn Makhlouf
5. Aïn Reggada
6. Aïn Sandel
7. Belkheir
8. Ben Djarah
9. Beni Mezline
10. Bordj Sabat
11. Bou Hachana
12. Bou Hamdane
13. Bouati Mahmoud
14. Boughouf
15. Boumahra Ahmed
16. Dahouara
17. Djeballah Khemissi
18. El Fedjoudj
19. Guellat Bou Dbaa
20. Guelma
21. Hammam Debagh
22. Hammam Nbail
23. Héliopolis
24. Kheraza
25. Medjez Amar
26. Medjez Sfa
27. Nechmaya
28. Oued Cheham
29. Oued Fragha
30. Oued Zenati
31. Ras El Agba
32. Roknia
33. Salaoua Announa
34. Tamlouka

== Notable residents ==
- Houari Boumédienne, President of Algeria
- Saint Possidius, bishop of Calama (Guelma) (5th century)

== See also ==
- Khamissa — Ancient Roman ruins in province.
