= Guelma =

Guelma, Calama Algerian Arabic: ڨالمة Tamazight: ⴳⴰⵍⵎⴰ
- City
- City of Guelma
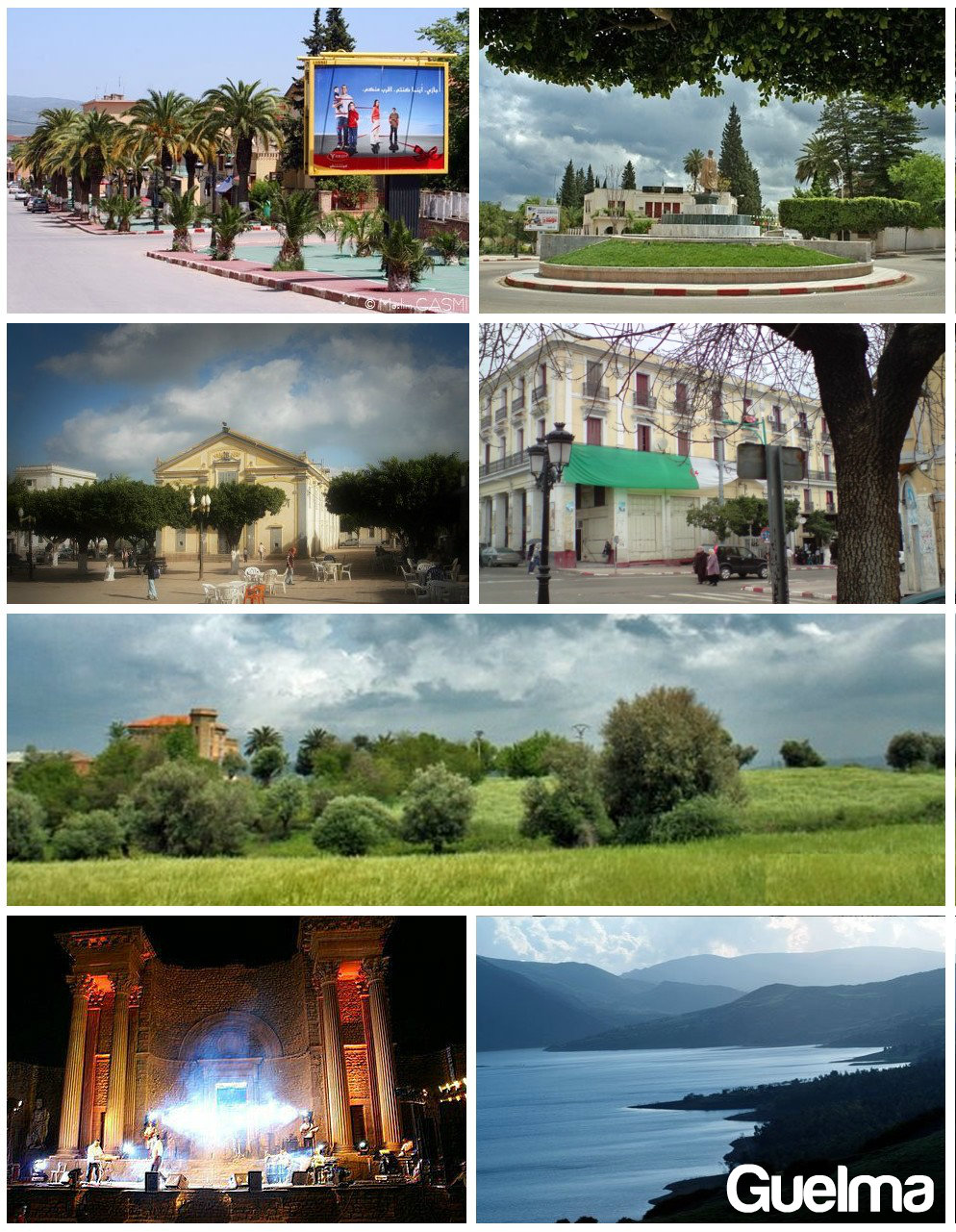
- From top left to bottom right clockwise: Souidani Boudjemmâa Boulevard, province administration, municipal theater, St. Augustine Place, Oued Maïz Road, the Roman theater, and Lake Bouhemdane

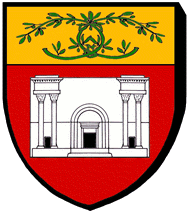
- Coat of arms
- Nickname: La ville assiette (The Basin City)
- Location of Guelma in the Guelma Province

- Location of Guelma within Algeria
- Coordinates: 36°27′N 7°26′E
- Country: Algeria
- Province: Guelma (seat)
- District: Guelma (seat)

Government
  - PMA Seats: 23

Area
  - Total: 44.80 km^{2} (17.30 sq mi)
- Elevation: 256 m (840 ft)

Population (2008)
  - Total: 120,004
  - Density: 2,679/km^{2} (6,938/sq mi)
- Time zone: UTC+01 (CET)
- Postal code: 24000
- ONS code: 2401
- Website: www.guelma.org

Guelma (Algerian Arabic: ڨالمة, romanized: Galma; Algerian Arabic pronunciation: [ɡelmæ], Tamazight: ⴳⴰⵍⵎⴰ, romanized: Galma) is the capital of Guelma Province and Guelma District, located in north-eastern Algeria, about 52 kilometers from the Mediterranean coast. Its location corresponds to that of the ancient Roman city of Calama.

== History ==
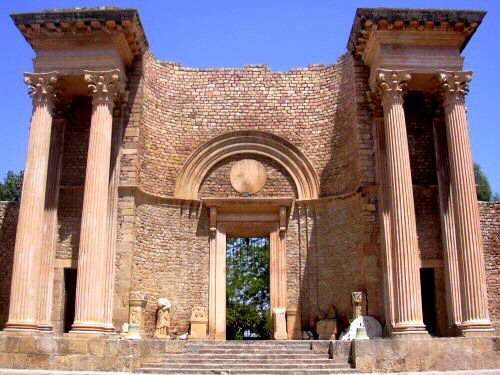
The Roman theater of Guelma

=== Antiquity ===
The first traces of human occupation in the Guelma region date back to the Paleolithic as evidenced by the Roknia Remains composed of more than 3,000 dolmens. The region was inhabited by a Libyan-Berber population and has a necropolis.

Though Guelma and its regions was settled from early prehistory, it was first established as a town under the Phoenicians, who called it Malaca, probably a Phoenician word meaning "salt" (sharing a common etymology with Málaga in Spain). Later, the Romans settled the area and renamed it Calama, part of the Roman province of Numidia. Calama prospered during the rise of Christianity; Saint Possidius was bishop of Guelma during the 5th century.

Later, the Vandal invasion devastated the area. When the Byzantines settled in the area, they built city walls to protect the community from further invasions. It was located in the Byzantine Exarchate of Africa. However, after the successful Islamic conquest of Algeria, the area was long abandoned as a formal settlement, even much later, during Ottoman rule.

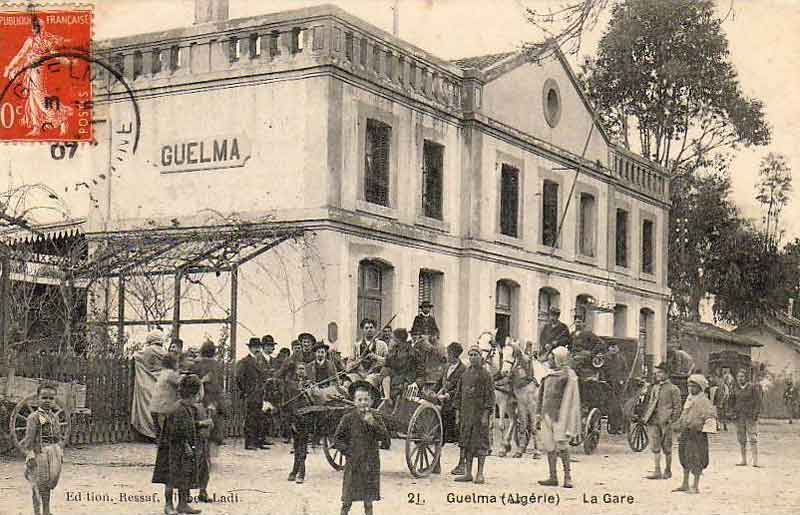
People in front of Guelma's train station (19th century postcard)

=== French rule ===
Guelma was re-established as a formal settlement during the French invasion and colonisation of Algeria, after seven centuries of abandonment. The annexation of the area began with the advancing of the French Army going to Constantine from Annaba. (France claimed that its occupation of Constantine wade north-eastern Algeria officially a part of France.) The Army discovered (and temporarily occupied) the ruins of Calama from 10 to 15 November 1836 under the command of general Bertrand Clausel.

Guelma was established as a city in 1836 and developed by French settlers.

Its communal constitution dates from 17 June 1854. A modern city quickly developed around the Roman ruins, first inside the restored Byzantine city walls, later also outside the walls, which continued to function during these times. There was also development near the railroad, which crossed the city from the west to the east. The Roman theater of Guelma was restored in 1905 under the rule of mayor M. Joly. The city had a high percentage of European settlers during these times, supported by the French colonial policy.

During the Sétif massacre of 8 May 1945, numerous settlers were killed. Guelma's oldest religious building that is still used for worship is the El-Atik Mosque, or "The Great Mosque Of Guelma", built in 1837. Guelma has also had a synagogue, which served local Jews, and a church on the place de Saint Augustin, which served Christian European settlers. Most of the French and many other European were Roman Catholic.

=== Post-independence ===
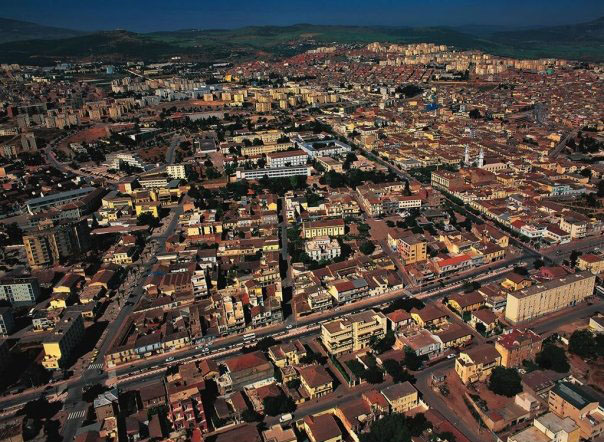
General view of Guelma

After the Independence of Algeria, both the European settlers and the indigenous Jews left, and the synagogue and the church were converted into mosques. The population of Guelma grew at a rapid pace.

== Geography ==
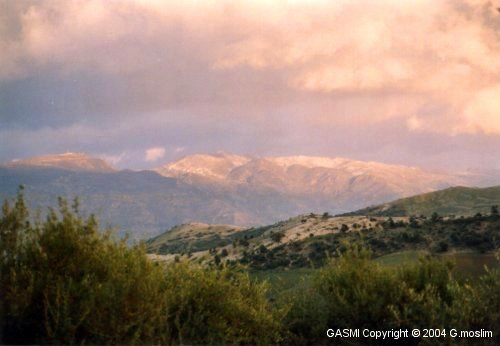
Nearby snow-covered Mount Maouna

Guelma is situated at the heart of a major agricultural region, 290 m above sea level and surrounded by mountains (Maouna, Dbegh, Houara). The region is very fertile because of the Seybouse River and a large dam that provides a vast irrigation scheme. It occupies a strategic geographic position as a crossroads in north-eastern Algeria, linking the coast of Wilaya of Annaba, El Taref and Skikda to inland areas such as Wilaya of Constantine, Oum El Bouagui and Souk-Ahras.

=== Climate ===
Guelma has a hot-summer Mediterranean climate (Köppen climate classification Csa). In winter there is more rainfall than in summer. The average annual temperature in Guelma is 17.2 °C (63.0 °F). About 557 mm (21.93 in) of precipitation falls annually.

Climate data for Guelma
Month	Jan	Feb	Mar	Apr	May	Jun	Jul	Aug	Sep	Oct	Nov	Dec	Year
Mean daily maximum °C (°F)	14.3 (57.7)	15.4 (59.7)	18.1 (64.6)	20.5 (68.9)	25.2 (77.4)	30.5 (86.9)	34.4 (93.9)	34.5 (94.1)	29.8 (85.6)	24.9 (76.8)	19.3 (66.7)	15.7 (60.3)	23.6 (74.4)
Mean daily minimum °C (°F)	3.6 (38.5)	4.6 (40.3)	6.1 (43.0)	8.0 (46.4)	11.4 (52.5)	15.0 (59.0)	17.8 (64.0)	18.9 (66.0)	16.9 (62.4)	12.8 (55.0)	9.2 (48.6)	5.8 (42.4)	10.8 (51.5)
Average precipitation mm (inches)	82 (3.2)	60 (2.4)	55 (2.2)	44 (1.7)	40 (1.6)	25 (1.0)	3 (0.1)	12 (0.5)	26 (1.0)	49 (1.9)	70 (2.8)	91 (3.6)	557 (21.9)
Source: Climate-Data.org, Climate data

== Industry ==
The city's industries include the manufacture of cycles and mopeds, sugar refinement, ceramics, canning, and semolina milling. Guelma is also known for some traditional industries such as knitting and pottery.

== Tourism ==
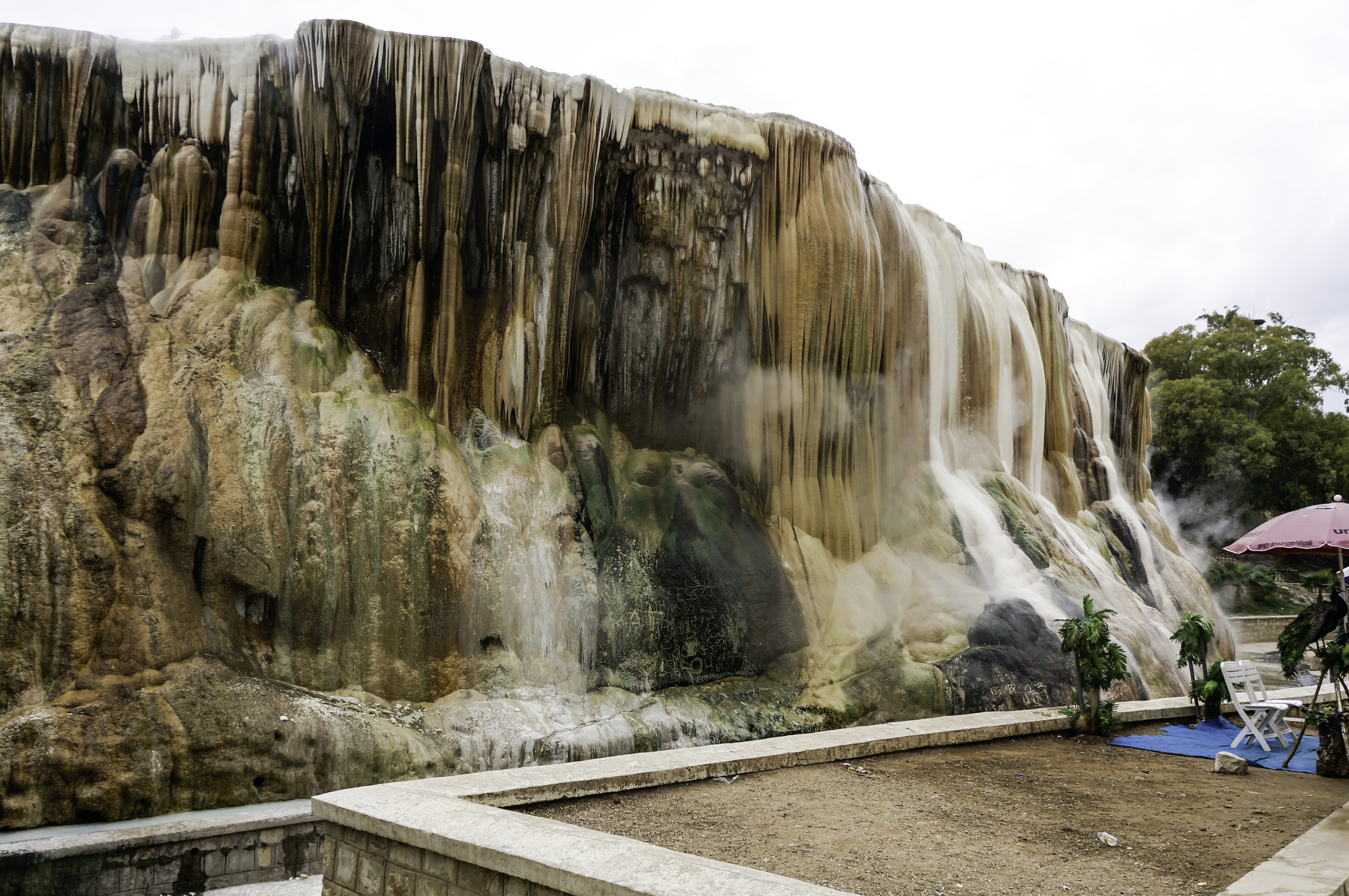
Hot springs

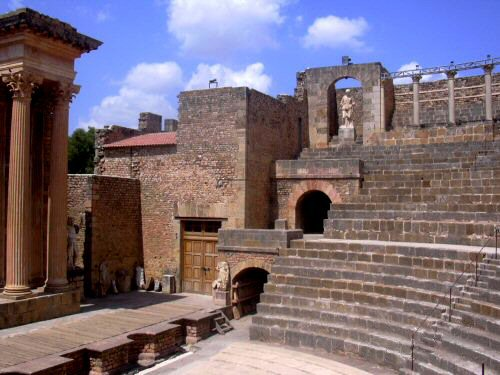
Roman Theatre of Guelma

Nearby tourist attractions include hot springs, Hammam Debagh (20 minutes away from Guelma), and Hammam Ouled Ali, which contains two resorts and provides services for tourists. Local hotels include: Hotel Mermoura, Hotel Tarik, Hotel Chelala (Hammam Debagh) which is the second hottest spring in the world with 98 °C (208 °F), Hotel la Couronne, the tourist complex of El Baraka (includes hotel A/B), and the tourist complex of Bouchahernie.

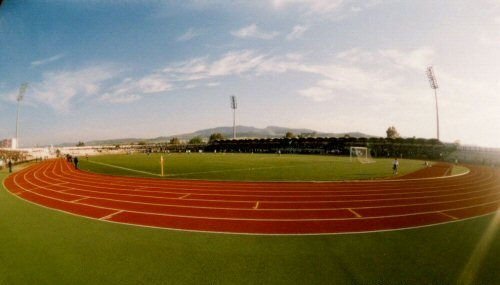
Guelma's Olympic Stadium

== Sports ==
The city has various sports facilities: the Olympic Stadium, Municipal Stadium, an Olympic swimming pool and a multi-sports hall. Football is the most popular sport in the city, as in all the cities of the country. Guelma has several football clubs:

- Espérance Sportive de Guelma known as ES Guelma (founded in 1939)
- The Olympic Football Guelma (founded in 1947)
- L'Ettardji Sarri Madinet Guelma (founded on 8 September 1977)

== Media ==
There are no local TV channels or newspapers in Guelma, however, Radio Algérie operates a radio channel in Guelma.

== Notable people ==
- Kateb Yacine (Kateb's is his family name, Yacine his first name) is an Algerian writer; born in Constantine August 2, 1929, died October 28 in Grenoble 1989
- Houari Boumediene, President of Algeria from 1965 to 1978; helped the country to stand up after the liberation war against the French
- Abdallah Baali, Algerian diplomat
- Charles-Michel Marle (born in 1934), French mathematician.
- Bettina Heinen-Ayech (1937–2020), painter.
- Henri Médus (1904–1985), French operatic bass
