= Djezar =

Djezzar الجزار
- City and Common
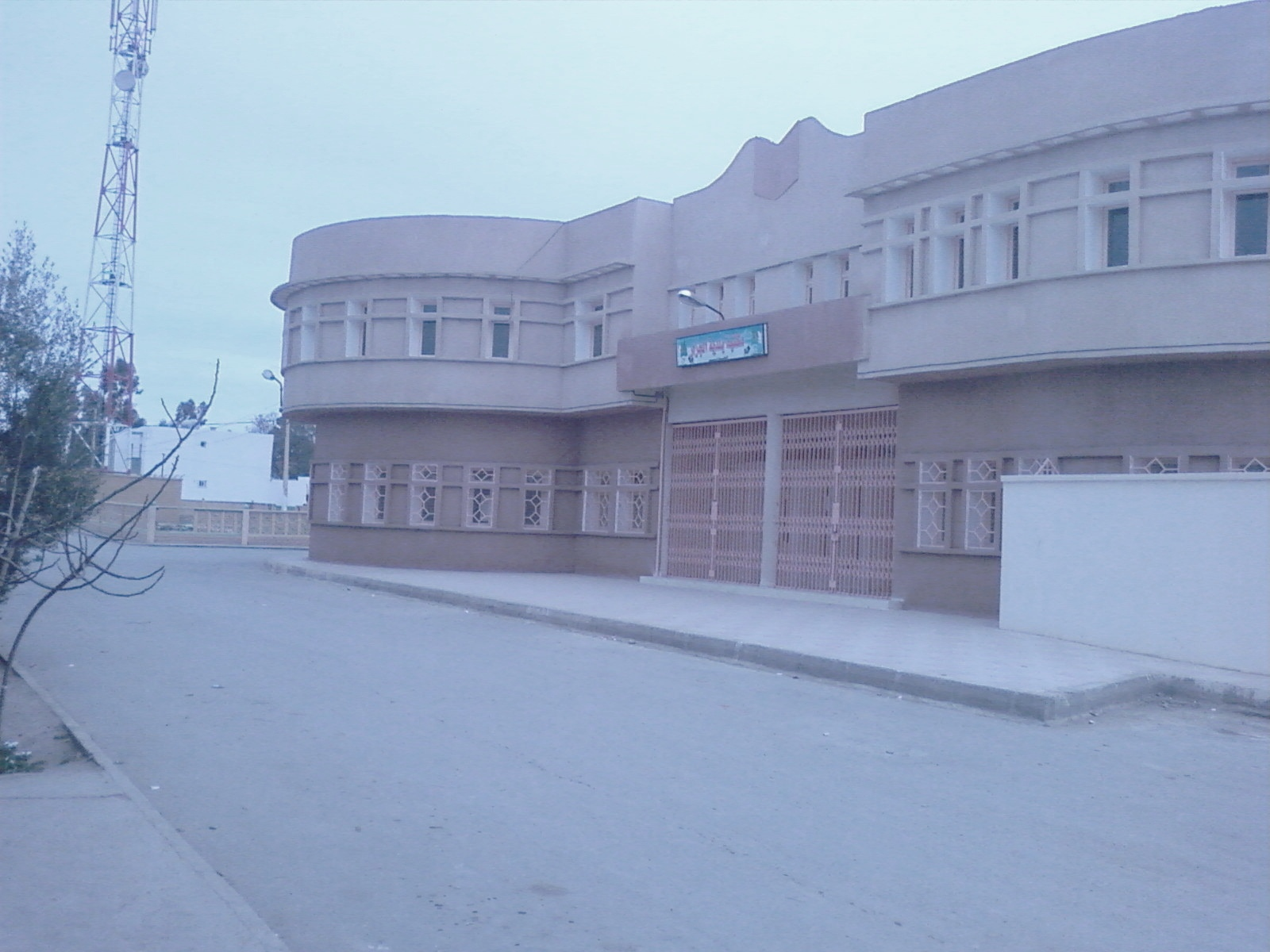
- Djezzar
- Nickname: ⴳⴻⵣⵣⴰⵔ
- Motto: "From the people, for the people"
- Location of Djezzar in the Batna Province

- Location of Djezzar in the Algeria
- Coordinates: 35.50956°N 5.26679°E
- Country: Algeria
- Province: Batna Province
- District: Djezzar District
- APC: 2012-2017

Government
  - Type: Municipality
  - Mayor: Yahia Cherif Omar (RND)

Area
  - Total: 126 sq mi (327 km^{2})

Population (2008)
  - Total: 22,124
- Time zone: UTC+1 (CET)
- Postal code: 05046
- ISO 3166 code: CP

Djezzar, Algeria is a town in north-eastern Algeria.
