= Amizour District =

Coordinates: 36°39′N 4°54′E

Amizour District Tadayra n Umiẓur
- District

- Location within Algeria
- Country: Algeria
- Province: Béjaïa Province
- Time zone: UTC+1 (CET)

Amizour District (Kabyle: Tadayra n Umiẓur) is a district of Béjaïa Province, Algeria.

== Municipalities ==
The district is further divided into 4 municipalities:

- Amizour
- Beni Djellil
- Semaoune
- Feraoun
