= Adekar District =

Coordinates: 36°41′N 4°40′E

Adekar District Tadayra n Udekkar
- District
- Country: Algeria
- Province: Béjaïa Province
- Time zone: UTC+1 (CET)

Adekar District (Kabyle: Tadayra n Udekkar) is a district of Béjaïa Province, Algeria.

== Municipalities ==
The district is further divided into 3 municipalities:

- Adekar
- Taourirt Ighil
- Beni Ksila
