= Aokas =

Aokas Aweqqas
- City
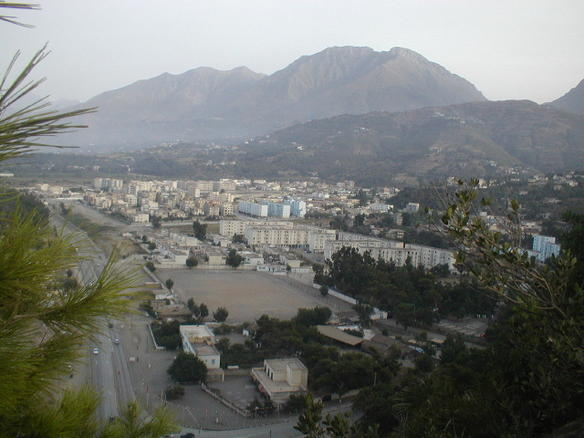
- Nickname: Aweqqas
- Location within Algeria
- Coordinates: 36°38′N 5°15′E
- Country: Algeria
- Province: Bejaia

Government
  - President of the People's Municipal Assembly: Lagha Mohamed (2017-2022)

Area
  - Total: 27.87 km^{2} (10.76 sq mi)
- Elevation: 300 m (980 ft)
  - Density: 574/km^{2} (1,490/sq mi)
- Time zone: UTC+1 (West Africa Time)
- Postal code: 06007
- NOS code: 0622

Aokas (Kabyle: Aweqqas) is a coastal city and commune in northern Algeria in the Béjaïa Province.

It is located at about 25 kilometres from the province's capital city of Bejaia. The commune of Aokas was created by decree of October 2, 1869. It covered an area of 2,202 hectares and had a population of 2,245 inhabitants in 1931. Its name in berber means shark. Its average altitude is 300 meters.

The population of Aokas was of 15,989 in 2008.

== Geography ==
Aokas (transliterated in tifinagh: ⴰⵡⵇⵇⴰⵙ), means shark in berber, is located in the wilaya of Bejaia, in coastal Kabylia.

=== Hamlets ===
Apart from the main locality of the commune, the hamlets of Aït Aïssa, Akkar, Mesbah, Tizi Djarmana, Aliouene ou Iaamrounene, Ansa, Tabellout, Tikherroubine, Amerzague, Tala Khaled, Laazib, Tidelsine, Iourarene, Tala Khelifa, Aguemoune, Tarmant I, Tarmant II and El Anseur are located in its confines.

=== Borders ===
North -> Mediterranean Sea
North-East -> Mediterranean Sea
East -> Souk El Tenine
South-East -> Souk El Tenine and Taskriout
South -> Taskriout
South-West -> Taskriout and Tizi N'Berber
West -> Tizi N'Berber
North-West -> Tichy

== Cityscape ==
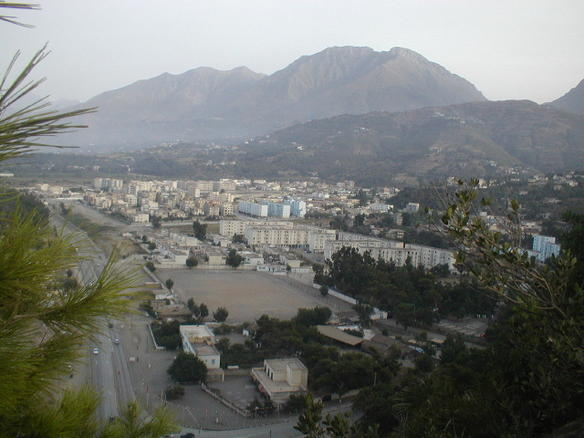
Aokas (Cape)

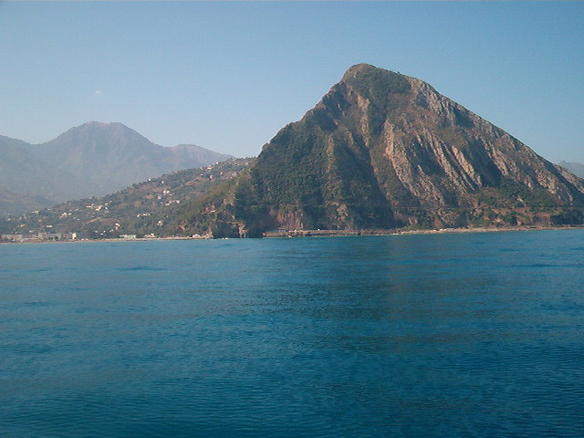
Aokas (...)
