= Souk El Tenine District =

Coordinates: 36.625163°N 5.336067°E

Souk El Tenine District Tadayra n Suq n Letnayen
- District
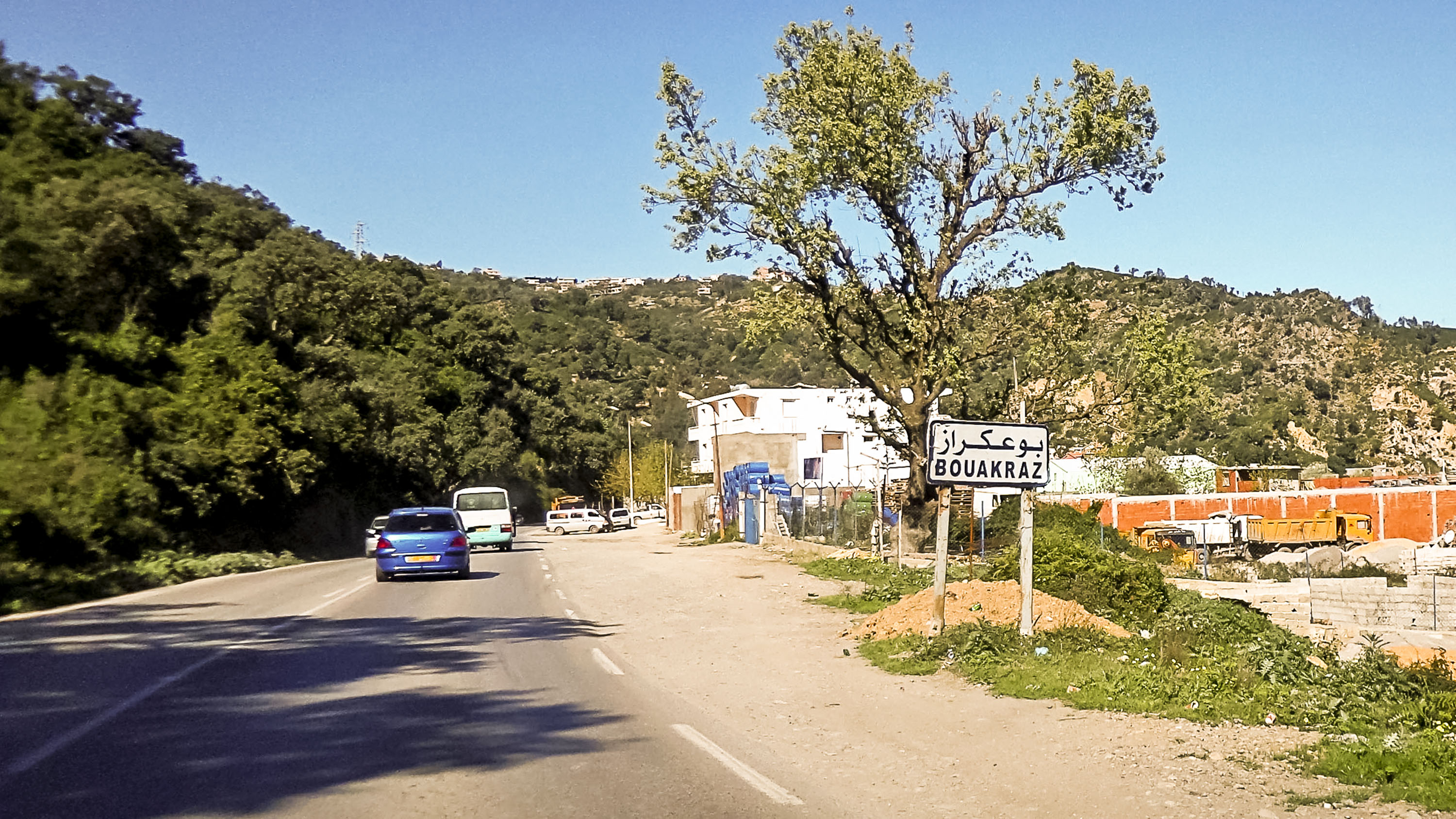
- Entering Bouakraz, Souk El Tenine

- Country: Algeria
- Province: Béjaïa Province
- Time zone: UTC+1 (CET)

Souk El Tenine District (Kabyle: Tadayra n Suq n Letnayen) is a district of Béjaïa Province, Algeria.

== Municipalities ==
The district is further divided into 3 municipalities:

- Souk El-Thenine
- Melbou
- Tamridjet
