= Darguina District =

Coordinates: 36°34′N 5°18′E

Darguina District Tadayra n Yiderginen
- District

- Location within Algeria
- Country: Algeria
- Province: Béjaïa Province
- Time zone: UTC+1 (CET)

Darguina District (Kabyle: Tadayra n Yiderginen) is a district of Béjaïa Province, Algeria.

== Municipalities ==
The district is further divided into 3 municipalities:

- Darguina
- Aït Smaïl
- Taskriout
