= Tazmalt District =

Coordinates: 36°23′24″N 4°24′00″E

Tazmalt District Tadayra n Tezmalt
- District

- Location within Algeria
- Country: Algeria
- Province: Béjaïa Province

Area
  - Total: 75 sq mi (193 km^{2})
- Time zone: UTC+1 (CET)

Tazmalt District (Kabyle: Tadayra n Tezmalt) is a district of Béjaïa Province, Algeria.

== Municipalities ==
The district is further divided into 3 municipalities:

- Tazmalt
- Beni Mellikeche
- Boudjellil
