= Akbou District =

Coordinates: 36°27′N 4°33′E

Akbou District Tadayra n Weqbu
- District

- Location within Algeria
- Country: Algeria
- Province: Béjaïa Province
- Time zone: UTC+1 (CET)

Akbou District (Kabyle: Tadayra n Weqbu) is a district of Béjaïa Province, Algeria.

== Municipalities ==
The district is further divided into 4 municipalities:

- Akbou
- Chelata
- Ighram
- Tamokra
