= Chemini District =

Coordinates: 36°35′27″N 4°36′32″E

Chemini District Tadayra n Cemmini
- District

- Location within Algeria
- Country: Algeria
- Province: Béjaïa Province
- Time zone: UTC+1 (CET)

Chemini District (Kabyle: Tadayra n Cemmini) is a district of Béjaïa Province, Algeria.

== Municipalities ==
The district is further divided into 4 municipalities:

- Chemini
- Tibane
- Souk-Oufella
- Akfadou
