= Tichy District =

Tichy District Tadayra n Ticci
- District
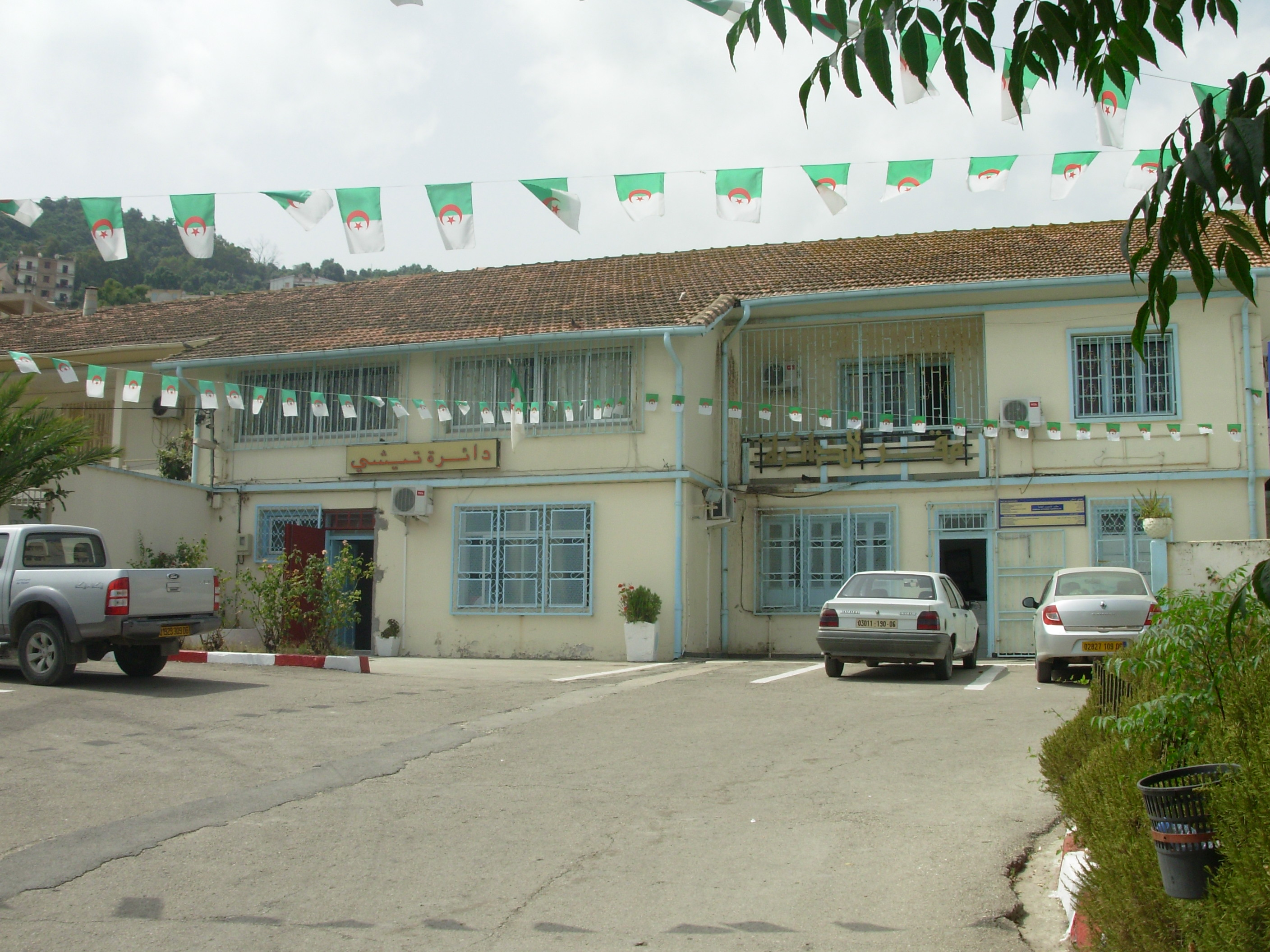

- Location within Algeria
- Coordinates: 36°40′2.9″N 5°9′35.2″E
- Country: Algeria
- Province: Béjaïa Province

Area
  - Total: 8,243 sq mi (21,349 km^{2})
- Time zone: UTC+1 (CET)

Tichy District (Kabyle: Tadayra n Ticci) is a district of Béjaïa Province, Algeria.

== Municipalities ==
The district is further divided into 3 municipalities:

- Tichy
- Boukhelifa
- Tala Hamza
