= Béjaïa District =

Coordinates: 36°45′09″N 5°04′16″E

Béjaïa District Tadayra n Bgayet
- District
- Country: Algeria
- Province: Béjaïa Province
- Time zone: UTC+1 (CET)

Béjaïa District (Kabyle: Tadayra n Bgayet) is a district of Béjaïa Province, Algeria.

== Municipalities ==
The district is further divided into 2 municipalities:

- Béjaïa
- Oued Ghir
