= El Kseur District =

Coordinates: 36.684389°N 4.852095°E

El Kseur District Tadayra n Iɣil Mɛebed Tadayra n Leqṣeṛ Ighil Maabed District
- District

- Location within Algeria
- Country: Algeria
- Province: Béjaïa Province
- Time zone: UTC+1 (CET)

El Kseur District (Kabyle: Tadayra n Leqṣeṛ) or Ighil Maabed District (Kabyle: Tadayra n Iɣil Mɛebed) is a district of Béjaïa Province, Algeria, and the region of Kabylie. Its capital is located in the town of El Kseur. The district abuts the Mediterranean Sea to the north.

The dïstrict includes the three communes

- El Kseur,
- Ifenain Ilmathen
- Toudja.
