= Iguerali =

Village in Béjaïa, Algeria

Iguerali is a village situated in the commune of Feraoun in the province of Béjaïa, Algeria.
