= Ighil Ali District =

Coordinates: 36°20′N 4°28′E

Ighil Ali District Tadayra n Yiɣil Ɛli
- District
- Country: Algeria
- Province: Béjaïa Province
- Time zone: UTC+1 (CET)

Ighil Ali District (Kabyle: Tadayra n Yiɣil Ɛli) is a district of Béjaïa Province, Algeria.

== Municipalities ==
The district is further divided into 2 municipalities:

- Ighil Ali
- Aït Rizine
