= Ait Immel =

Kabyle tribe

Ait Immel At Yemmel
- Kabyle tribe
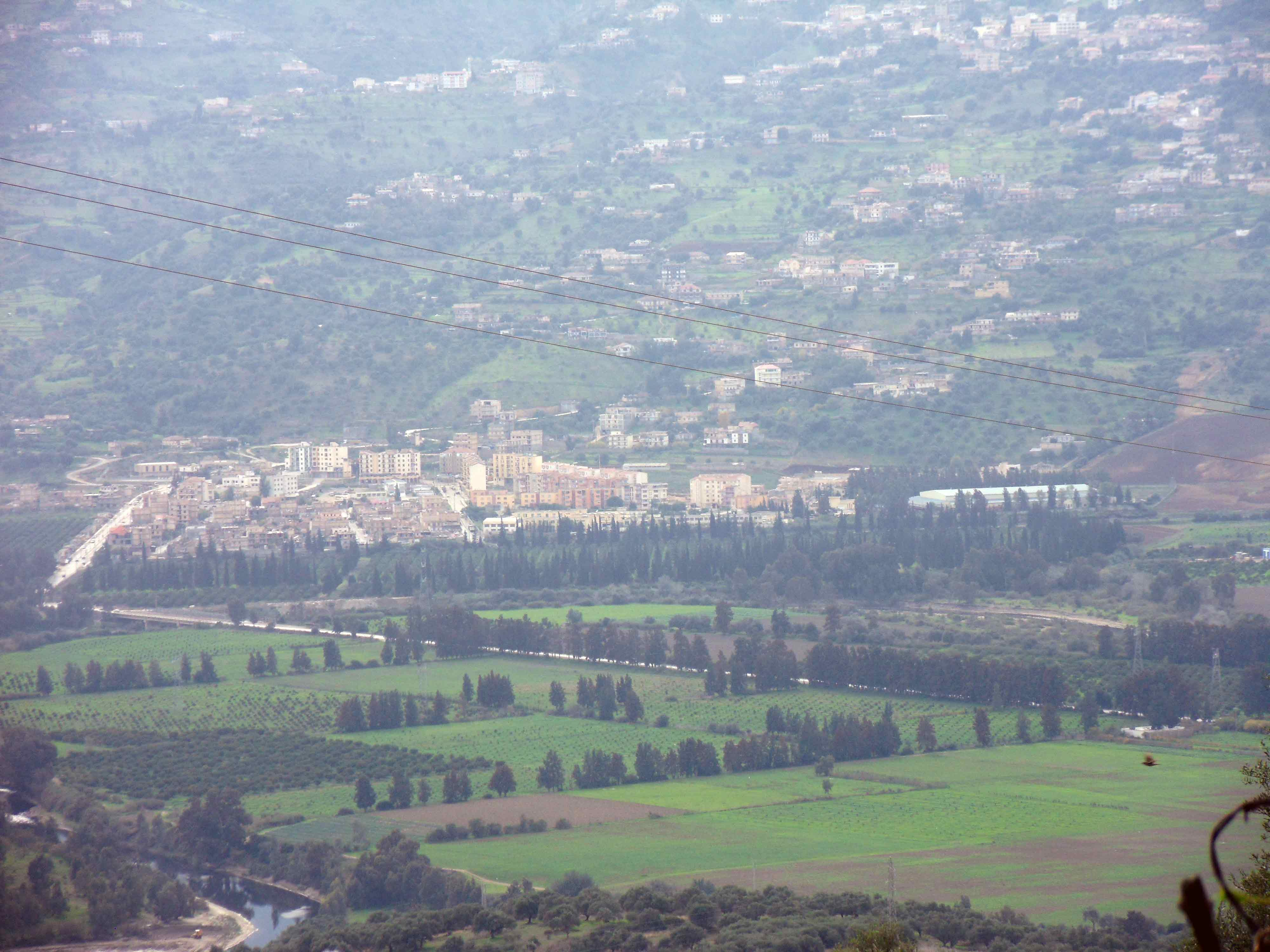
- View on Timezrit
- Ethnicity: Kabyles
- Location: Soummam valley, Kabylia
- Language: Kabyle
- Religion: Islam

Ait Immel (Kabyle: At Yemmel) is a Kabyle tribe located in the Soummam valley, south-west of Béjaïa mainly in Timezrit.

== Etymology ==
The name "Ait Immel" is composed of the name Ait meaning "sons of" and Immel. "Ait Immel" means "sons/descendants of Immel".

During colonial times, the name of the tribe was arabized and "Ait" was replaced with "Beni".

== History ==
The Ait Immel are located mainly in Timezrit District, which was historically part of their land. They mainly practiced agriculture and trade, and were noted to be relatively rich. They produced a wide variety of things, such as cereals, olive oil, fruits (especially grapes), honey, and they also practiced animal husbandry. They bordered the Soummam River around which they built watermills to produce flour. They were also known as warriors.

In the 6th century, the town of Icosium was briefly captured by some Berber-Numidian tribes, some of which were the ancestors of the Ath Immel.

The Ait Immel paid tribute/taxes to the Beylik of Constantine, although what the payment was, or how much of it was paid isn't known. As an isolated tribe inside the Kabyle mountains, other than paying tribute, they remained autonomous from the central government. According to French estimates, they possessed about 800 troops, the majority of whom were infantry.

=== Wars with France ===
In the mid 19th century the Ait Immel came into conflict several time with France.

In 1847, after the French took over Kabylia after defeating Ahmed bin Salem, the Ait Immel proceeded to rebel.

In 1850, French Brigadier general Joseph Napoléon Paul de Barral (no relation to Napoleon Bonparte) attempted to pacify the Ait Immel along with other local tribes, such as the Ait Iramel. In the ensuing battle, known as the Battle of Amsiouene, the Ait Iramel, and Ait Immel successfully killed Joseph Napoléon, and routed his unit.

In 1851 Sherif Boubaghla, a famous leader of local resistance was pursued by the French. He hid among the Ait Immel, and encouraged them to put up a resistance against the advancing French army. A few days later, when the French army arrived and demanded the Ait Immel to give Boubaghla over to them, they refused and put up a resistance. In the ensuing battle, which lasted for over 4 days, much longer than what the French army initially expected, the French secured the surrender of the Ait Immel tribe. The French were surprised at the "vigorous resistance" the Ait Immel put up.
