= Abdelmalek Sayad =

French sociologist (1933–1998)

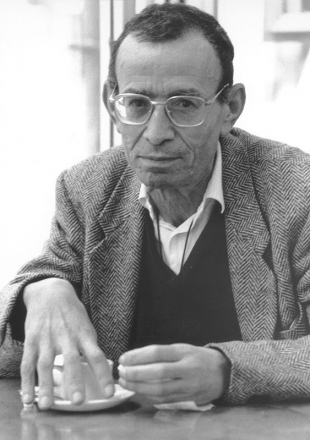
Abdelmalek sayad.jpg

Abdelmalek Sayad (November 24, 1933, in Beni Djellil, Algeria – March 13, 1998, in Paris, France) was a sociologist, first as an assistant to Pierre Bourdieu, then as a research director at the French CNRS and at the School for Advanced Studies in the Social Sciences. He studied migration issues in French social sciences.

== Life and career ==
Abdelmalek Sayad was born in 1933 in Aghbala, in the Beni Djellil commune in Kabylie, a Berber region in Northern Algeria. The third child and only boy of a family of five children, he started attending his village's primary school at seven. He then went on to study in Béjaïa's highschool, before training to be a primary school teacher in Algiers. He was then appointed a teacher in a school in the Casbah of Algiers. He continued studying at Algiers university in parallel, where he met Pierre Bourdieu.

Sayad moved to France in 1963, after the Algerian independence in 1962. He started working on short-term contracts at the Centre de sociologie européenne at the School for Advanced Studies in the Social Sciences. In 1977, he was hired at the Centre national de la recherche scientifique (CNRS), as research director in sociology.

Sayad died on March 13, 1998. He was married to Rebecca Sayad, who, after his death, donated his archive to the Cité nationale de l'histoire de l'immigration (Paris) in 2006. The library of this museum is named after him. The Association of the friends of Abdelmalek Sayad has organised events surrounding his thought, and contributed to make his work known in France and in Algeria, via an exhibition, conferences and workshops.

== Sociology ==
Sayad studied immigration in French society. He argued that it was a "total social fact", using Marcel Mauss's expression, to "underline that the immigrant was also an emigrant", and argued against analyses which were limited to comparing the economic 'costs' and 'benefits' of immigration. He also examined the effect of colonisation in Algeria and of the war of independence in his work with Pierre Bourdieu, Le Déracinement. La crise de l'agriculture traditionnelle en Algérie (The Uprooting: The Crisis of Traditional Agriculture in Algeria).

Sayad examined the situation of migrants arriving in France. Many articles he wrote on the subject were published after his death in a book entitled La double absence (The double absence), with a foreword by Pierre Bourdieu. which was translated by David Macey as « The Suffering of the immigrant ».

== Bibliography ==
- With Pierre Bourdieu, Le déracinement : La crise de l'agriculture traditionnelle en Algérie, Paris, Les Éditions de Minuit, 1964
- With Alain Gillette, L'immigration algérienne en France, Paris, Éditions Entente, 1976, 127 pages (under the pseudonym Malek Ath-Messaoud), 2^{de} édition, 1998, 279 pages
- L'immigration, ou les paradoxes de l'altérité, De Boeck Université, 1992, 331 p.
- Un Nanterre algérien, terre de bidonvilles (avec Éliane Dupuy), Autrement, 1998, 125 p.
- La double absence. Des illusions de l'émigré aux souffrances de l'immigré. Paris, Seuil, 1999, 438 p. Coll. Liber, translated as The suffering of the immigrant, Cambridge, Polity Press, 2004. Translated by David Macey.
- Histoire et recherche identitaire suivi de Entretien avec Hassan Arfaoui, Bouchène, 2002, 113 p.
- Algeria: nazionalismo senza nazione, éd. Mesogea, 2003.
- L'immigration ou les paradoxes de l'altérité. 1. L'illusion du provisoire, Paris, Éditions Raisons d'agir, 2006, 218 p.
- L'immigration ou les paradoxes de l'altérité. 2. Les enfants illégitimes, Paris, Éditions Raisons d'agir, 2006, 208 p.
- L'immigration ou les paradoxes de l'altérité. 3. La fabrication des identités culturelles, Paris, Éditions Raisons d'agir, 2014, 205 p. Préface d'Amin Pérez
- L'école et les enfants de l'immigration, essais critiques, Paris, Seuil, La couleur des idées, 2014,239p., Edition établie, présentée et annotée par Benoit Falaize et Smaïn Laacher.
