= Kherrata District =

Coordinates: 36°29′34″N 5°16′39″E

Kherrata District Tadayra n Xerraṭa
- District
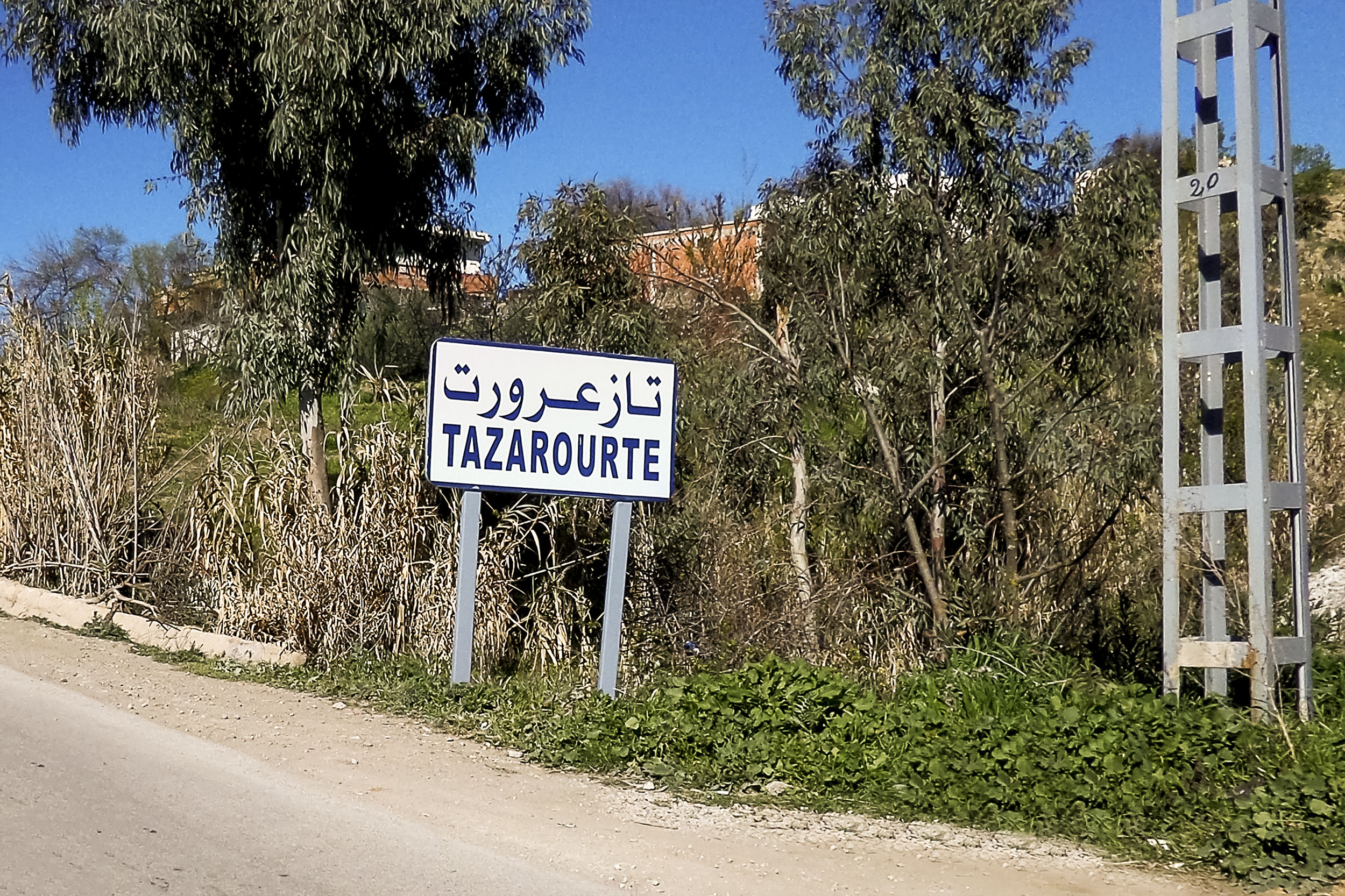
- Tazarourte

- Country: Algeria
- Province: Béjaïa Province
- Time zone: UTC+1 (CET)

Kherrata District (Kabyle: Tadayra n Xerraṭa) is a district of Béjaïa Province, Algeria.

== Municipalities ==
The district is further divided into 2 municipalities:

- Kherrata
- Draâ El-Kaïd
