= Boudjellil =

Boudjellil At Bujlil (Kabyle)
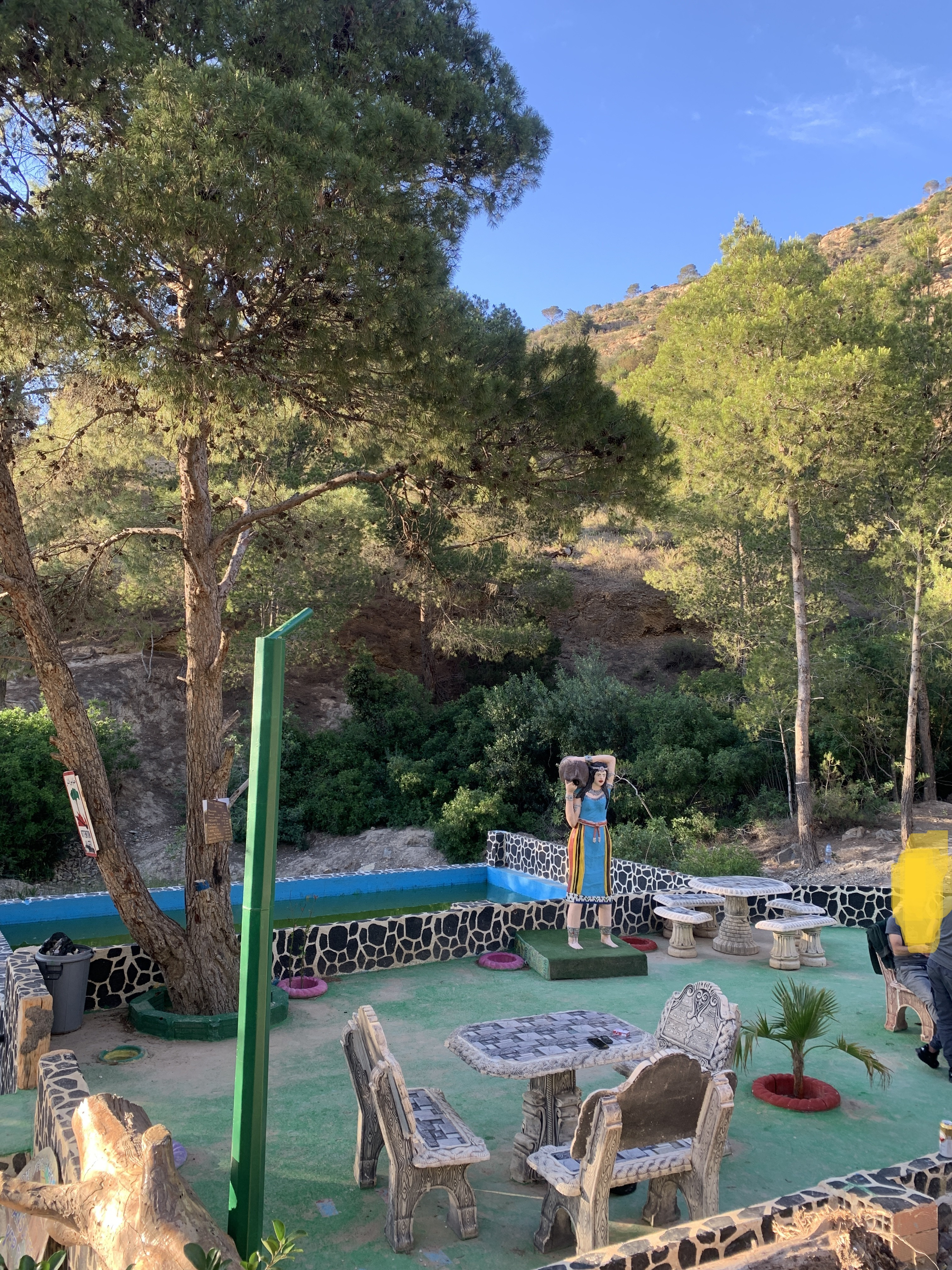

- Location within Algeria
- Coordinates: 36°20′N 4°21′E
- Country: Algeria
- Province: Bejaia
- Time zone: UTC+1 (West Africa Time)

Boudjellil (Kabyle: At Bujlil) is a commune in northern Algeria in the Béjaïa Province.

Boudjellil is home to the community of Béni Mansour, where the regional Béni Mansour–Bejaïa railway connects to the Algiers–Skikda main line.

== Geography ==
=== Location ===
Boudjellil is located in the Soummam Valley, in the southern Djurdjura at the extreme southwest of the Béjaïa Province. The commune borders the provinces of Bouira and Bordj Bou Arreridj, and is bounded by Tazmalt to the north, Aït Rizine and Ighil Ali to the east, Ighil Ali again to the south, Chorfa, Bouïra and Ath Mansour Taourirt (Bouira Province) to the west, and finally Ouled Sidi Brahim (Bordj Bou Arreridj) to the southwest. It is part of the Sahel-Djurdjura valley of Little Kabylie.

- Boudjellil is one of the three communes that make up the historic tribe of Ath Abbes along with Ait R'zine and Ighil Ali.

=== Relief, Geology, Hydrography ===
Boudjellil is the largest commune in the Béjaïa Province with an area of 99.85 km^{2} (38.55 sq mi)

=== Climate ===
==== Winters ====
Winters were mild, with average temperatures around 12°C in January. Precipitation was moderate, totaling about 750 mm per year, with episodes of light rain more frequent in December and January.

==== Summers ====
Summers were extremely hot, with temperatures reaching 41°C in July and August. The days were long and sunny. Nights, although cooler, were softened by a gentle breeze.

==== Springs and Autumns ====
Springs and autumns offered pleasant climatic conditions, with spring temperatures ranging between 15°C and 25°C and autumn temperatures between 20°C and 30°C. Moderate rain prepared the region for the colder months.

In summary, Boudjellil experienced a varied climate in 2024, with very hot and dry summers, mild winters with some light rain, and pleasant springs and autumns.

=== Hamlets, Districts, and Villages ===
The commune of Boudjellil consists of 17 villages:

- Avalich
- Aftis
- Tigrine
- Hamda
- Ath wihdhan
- Thala lbir
- Tansawth
- Ath saida
- Ath mansour
- Ath Helassa
- Tawrirth
- Ath dacéne
- Talafsa
- Tighilt
- Ath alouane
- Metchike
- Azrou
- Boudjellil

== History ==
According to oral tradition, the inhabitants of Ait Vujlil in the commune lived in (Laazib N Ibujlilen) on the banks of Assif Asemmam. Threatened by a devastating epidemic, they had to abandon their lands and seek refuge mainly on the heights of Tinicwin (Agrur Nu Zimba) before finally settling in Azru, Abaliche, and Tighilt.

A-vujlil (pl. I-bujlilen) or the man who wears the tunic (ajlil), tends to identify, around the 19th century, as a landowner in an area between the Arch of Ath Aabbas and that of Ath Melikech, extending from Tamurt Ufella to the west, up to the limits of Ath Wihdan and the freshwater source (Thala M'ghisa) to the east.

== Demographics ==
.....

== Administration and Politics ==
List of Mayors of Boudjellil
- Alilat Salah
- Saidani Seddik
- Gouali Ali
- Yahaoui Mokrane
- Belkacemi Mohand Seghir
- Fedala Hamimi
- Benamara Mohand
- Oulebsir Mohand Tayeb
- Lebsir Kamel

== Economy ==
The commune has several companies, among them:

- UFMATP, specialized in the manufacture of public works and agricultural machinery.
- Platrière Boudjellil located in Thala lvir

=== Related Articles ===
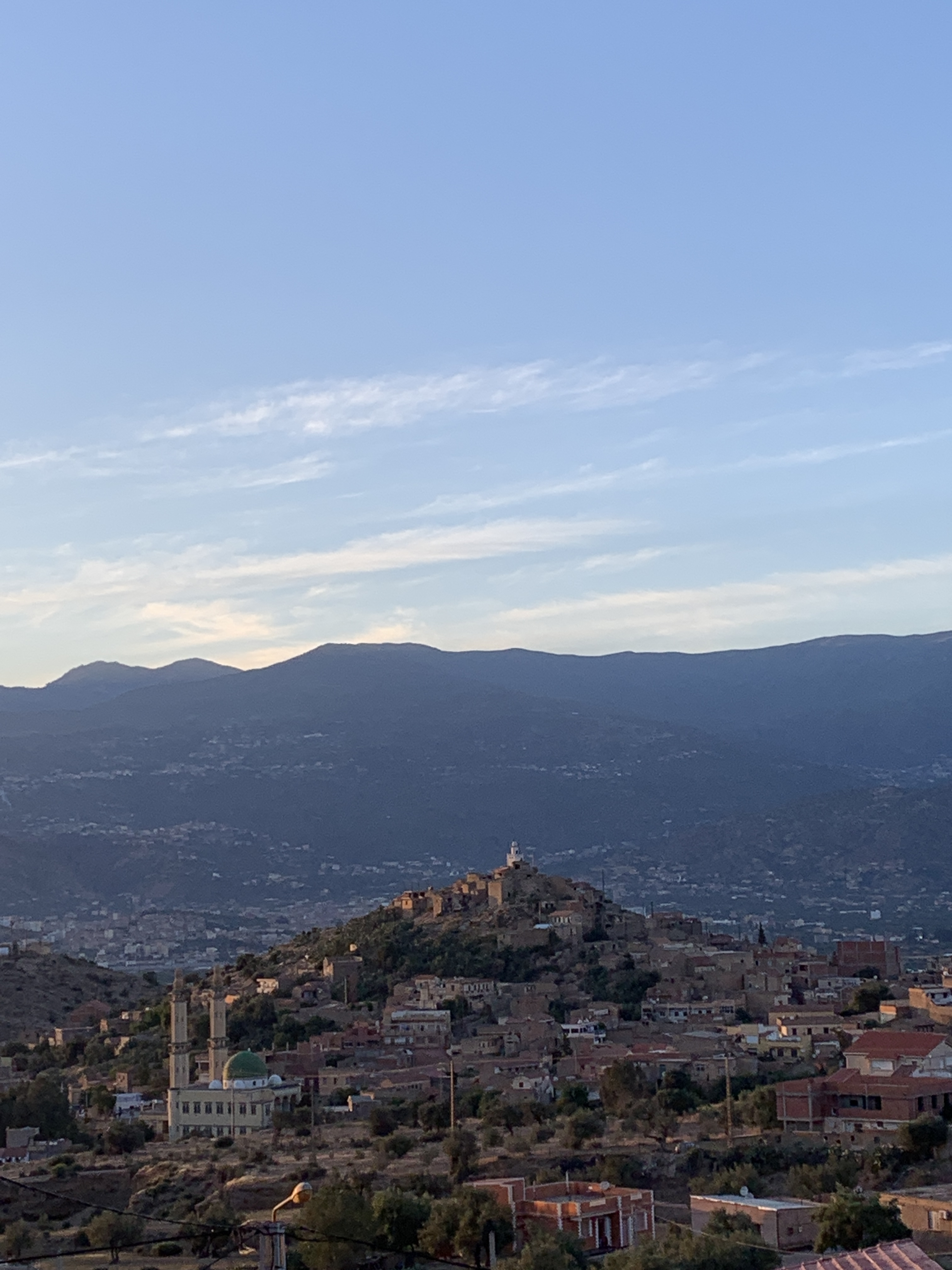
Boudjellil on May 10, 2024

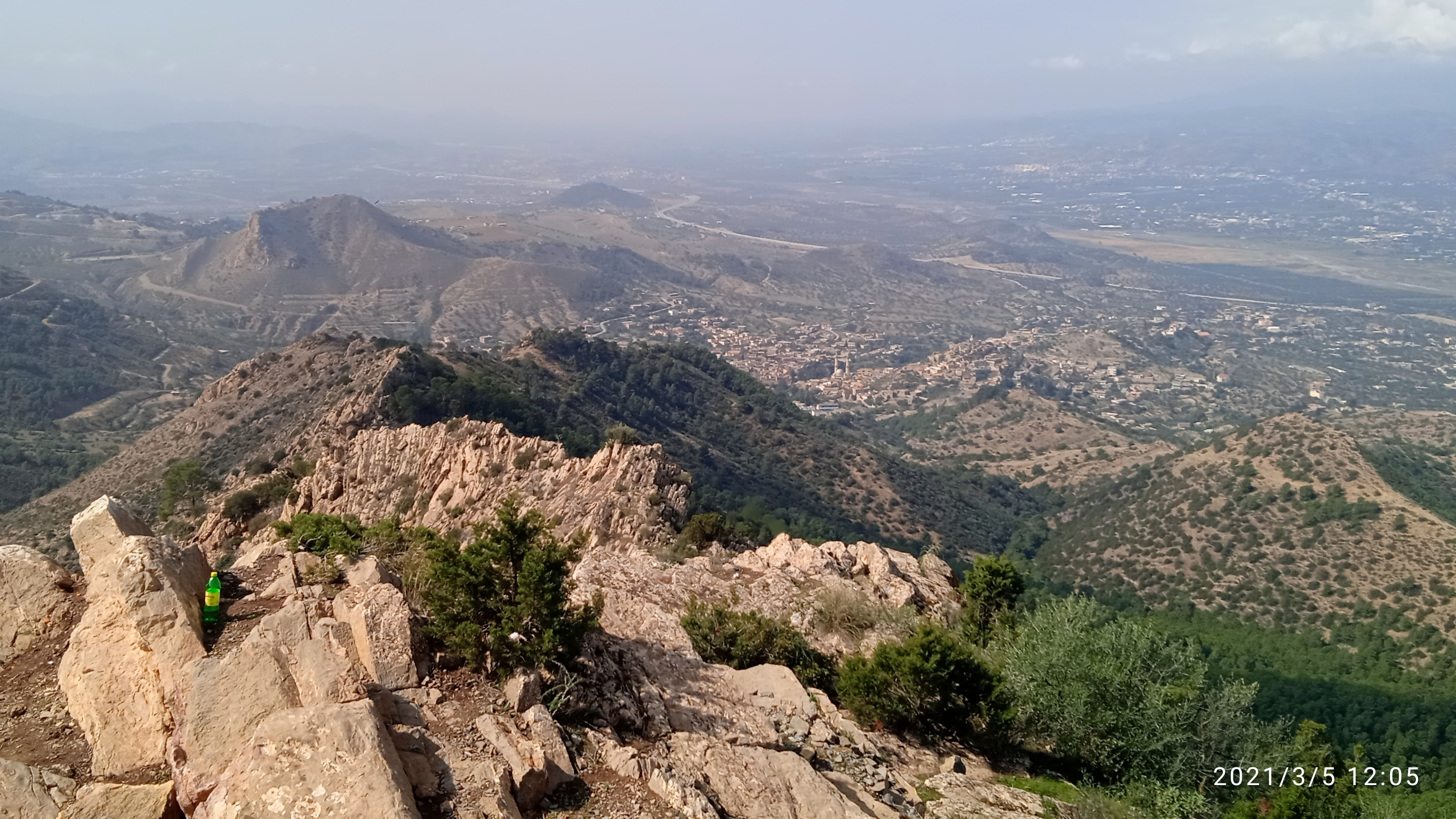
Azro N'rfiss le 5 Mars 2021
