= Ighram =

Ighram Iɣrem (Kabyle)
- Commune and town

- Location within Algeria
- Coordinates: 36°28′N 4°31′E
- Country: Algeria
- Province: Béjaïa

Area
  - Total: 50.11 km^{2} (19.35 sq mi)

Population (2003)
  - Total: 16,878
- Time zone: UTC+1 (West Africa Time)

Ighram (Kabyle: Iɣrem) is a town and commune of Kabylie in northern Algeria. The town is located on the Soummam, on its left bank. It is located south-west of the wilaya of Béjaïa, a distance of more than 70 km from the provincial capital and less than 5 km from Akbou. It covers an area of 50.11 square kilometers and the population of the town of Ighram is estimated at 16 878 inhabitants, 8 472 men and 8 406 women with a density of 332 inhabitants / km ² (statistics 31 December 2003).

Administratively, it is bordered by the wilaya of Tizi Ouzou to the north, Akbou and Tazmalt to the south, to the west by the town of Beni Mellikeche.

The commune is composed of several villages (Elma-Ouguenane, Amar Ouzeguene Ath, Ath Kerrou, Azoun, Ath Selam, Boukir, Iaamourene, Igguirven, Ighrem Ighil Nacer, Ikherbouchen, Irsen, Iaâzunène, Laazib Ulahdir, Elmecheta, Taslent, Tazagharth, Tifthisin, Tighilt Makhlouf).

The homes are centered on courtyards and agriculture employs much of the population. The war of liberation and emigration have emptied many of the villages of their population, resulting in the relative deterioration of buildings.

The climate in Ighram both in winters and summers mild and hot respectively. Annual rainfall averages vary between 6.33 mm and 70.45 mm with peak rainfall in the month of December. In winter, the town receives an average of 63.63 mm of water. Temperatures range from 8.68 °C and 30.80 °C.

Economically the town of Ighram is dependent on nearby Akbou.
