= Ifri-Ouzellaguen District =

Coordinates: 36.54203°N 4.61291°E

Ifri-Ouzellaguen District Tadayra n Ifri Wuzellagen ⵉⴼⵔⵉ ⵏ ⵡⴰⵡⵣⴻⵍⴰⴳⴻⵏ
- District
- Country: Algeria
- Province: Béjaïa Province
- Time zone: UTC+1 (CET)

Ifri-Ouzellaguen District (Kabyle: Tadayra n Ifri Wuzellagen) is a district of Béjaïa Province, Algeria.

== Municipalities ==
The district has 1 municipality:

- Ouzellaguen
