= Mecisna =

Coordinates: 36.5641°N 4.7126°E

Mecisna Imsisen (Kabyle)
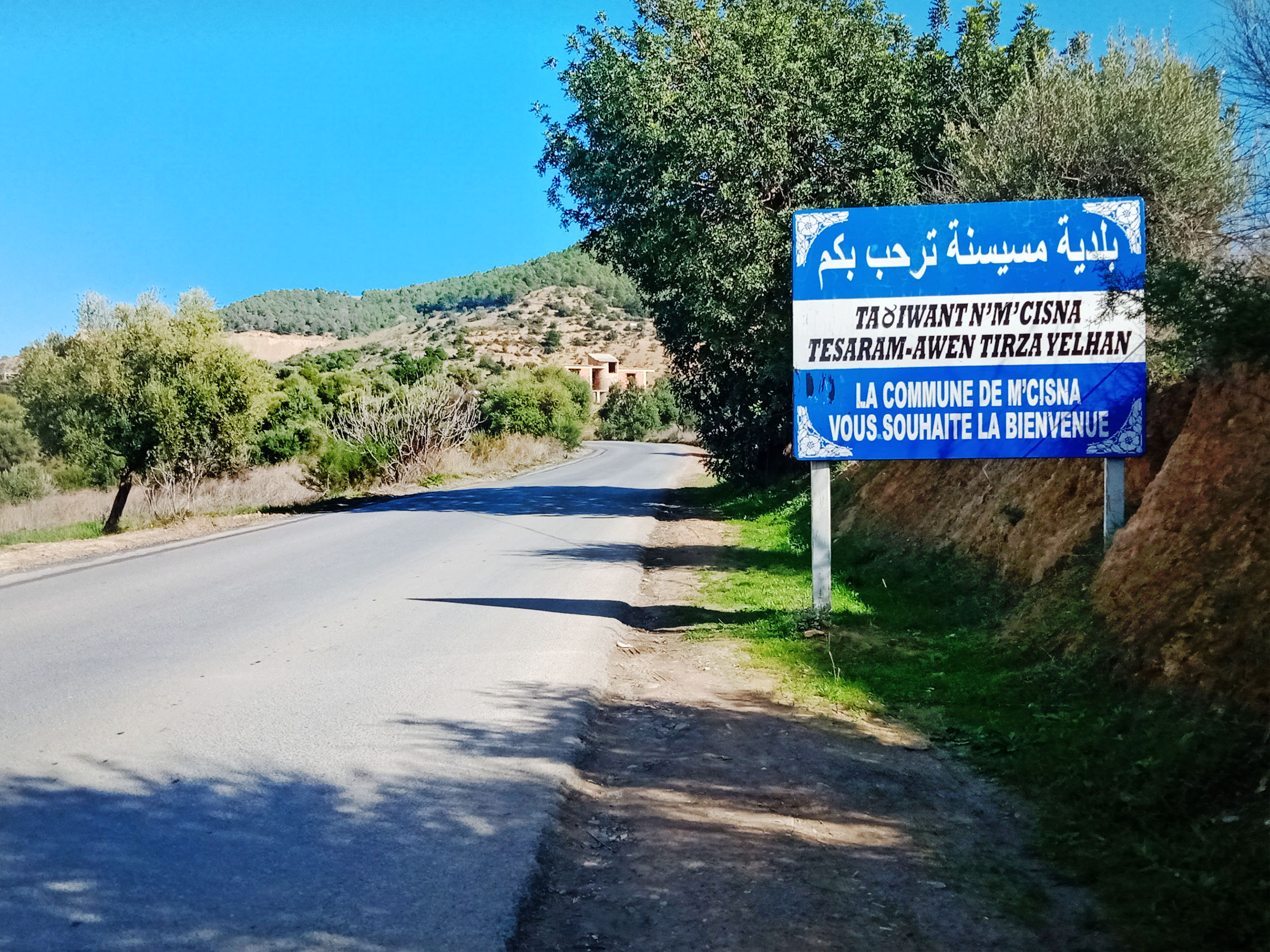
- Interactive map of Mecisna
- Country: Algeria
- Province: Béjaïa
- Time zone: UTC+1 (West Africa Time)

Mecisna (Kabyle: Imsisen) is a commune of northern Algeria in the Béjaïa Province, in Kabylia.
