= Béni Mansour–Bejaïa railway =

Railway line in Algeria

Service
- Type: Heavy rail
- System: SNTF

History
- Opened: 1888
- Last extension: 1889

Technical
- Line length: 88 km (55 mi)
- Number of tracks: Single track
- Track gauge: 1,435 mm (4 ft 8 1/2 in) standard gauge
- Electrification: None
- Operating speed: 75 km/h (47 mph)

The Béni Mansour–Béjaïa railway is an Algerian railway connecting the Soummam River valley to the Algiers–Skikda railway over 88 kilometers. The line was opened in full in 1899.

== History ==
During French Algeria, plans were made to connect Béjaia to the Algerian railway hub of Sétif in 1857. However, plans were revised to instead connect Béjaïa to the Algiers–Skikda main line in the village of Béni Mansour (municipality of Boudjellil) between Algiers and Sétif. The Compagnie de l'est algérien received the concession for building this railway on May 21, 1884. The line was first opened from Béjaïa to Tazmalt over a distance of 81 kilometers on December 10, 1888, and then connected to the Algiers–Skikda main line on March 24, 1889.

== Description ==
This single-track line generally flows the Soummam River valley in Bejaia Province and has stations in the communities of Béni Mansour (Boudjellil municipality), Tazmalt, Ouzellaguen municipality), Takriest-Seddouk (Seddouk municipality), Sidi Aïch, Ifenain Ilmathen, El Kseur, Oued Ghir, and the provincial capital of Béjaia.
