= Timezrit District =

Coordinates: 36°39′N 4°46′E

Timezrit District Tadayra n Timeẓrit
- District

- Location within Algeria
- Country: Algeria
- Province: Béjaïa Province

Area
  - Total: 262 sq mi (679 km^{2})

Population (2008)
  - Total: 25,853
- Time zone: UTC+1 (CET)

Timezrit District (Kabyle: Tadayra n Timeẓrit) is a district of Béjaïa Province, Algeria.

== Municipalities ==
The district has 1 municipality:

- Timezrit
