= Akfadou =

Akfadou Akfadu, ⴰⴽⴼⴰⴷⵓ (Kabyle)
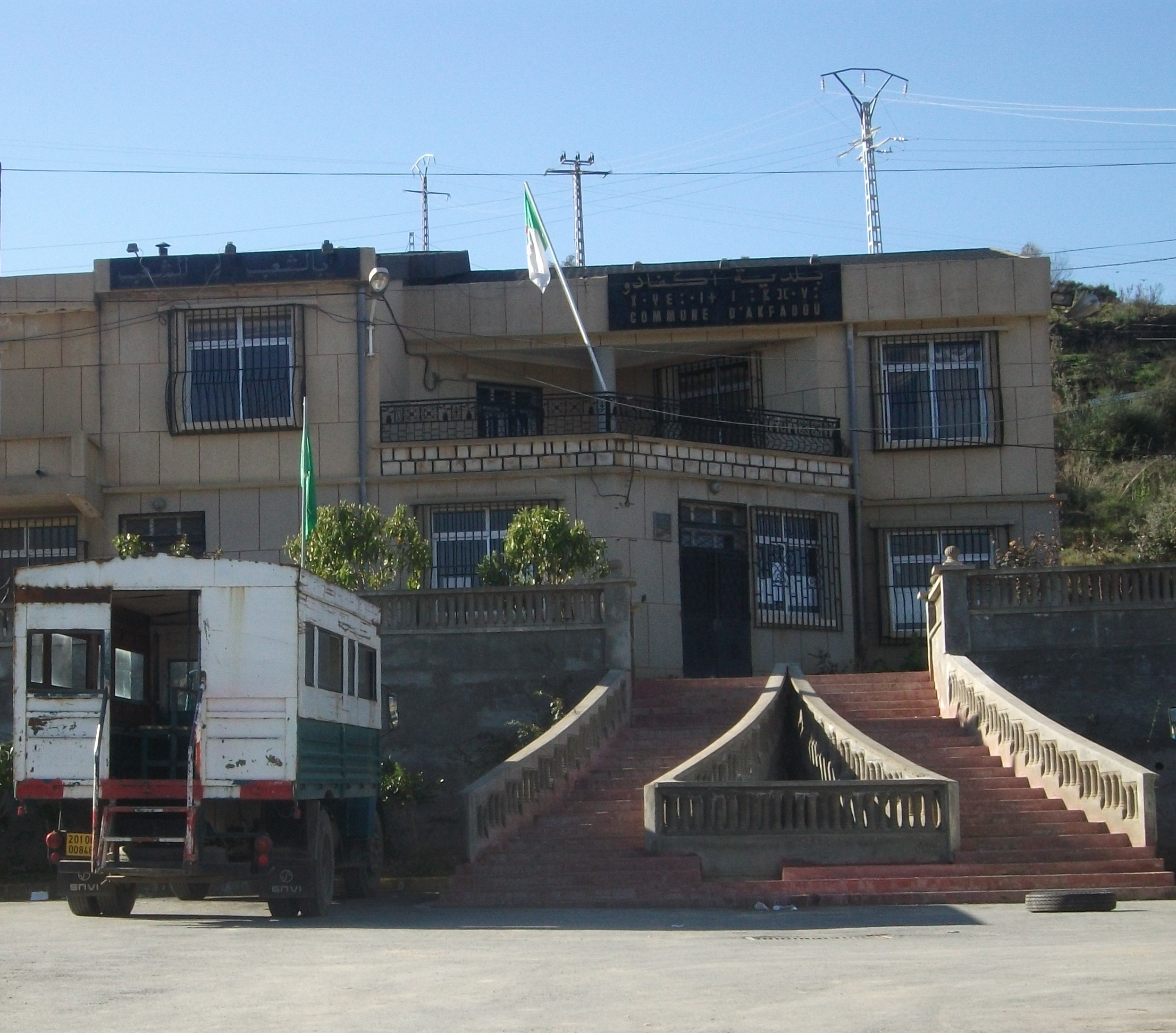
- Nickname: Athmensour

- Location within Algeria
- Coordinates: 36°38′N 4°36′E
- Country: Algeria
- Province: Bejaia

Area
  - Total: 42.01 km^{2} (16.22 sq mi)

Population (2008)
  - Total: 7,358
  - Density: 175.1/km^{2} (453.6/sq mi)
- Time zone: UTC+1 (West Africa Time)

Akfadou (Kabyle: Akfadu) is a commune in northern Algeria in the Béjaïa Province. This locale is noted for its local population of Barbary macaques, Macaca sylvanus.

== Etymology ==
The name Akfadou is a contraction of the words "akfuḍ̣̣" and "aḍ̣̣U" which respectively mean "multiple or excess" and "wind". This name recalls the harsh climate in this region especially in winter when the cold winds gust and heavy snows often isolate small villages. During the exploration of Kabylia by the French occupation in 1850, the word Akfadou was translated as the top wind (French: cime au vent).

== Economy ==
The Akfadou economy is based mainly on the retail and transport.

It is also characterized by agriculture based on polyculture and animal husbandry. The herd is made up of cattle, most of which are raised for dairy or meat production. Sheep and goats are also raised here.
