= Ifenain Ilmathen =

Coordinates: 36°40′18″N 4°47′26″E

Fenaia Il Maten Ifnayen (Kabyle)
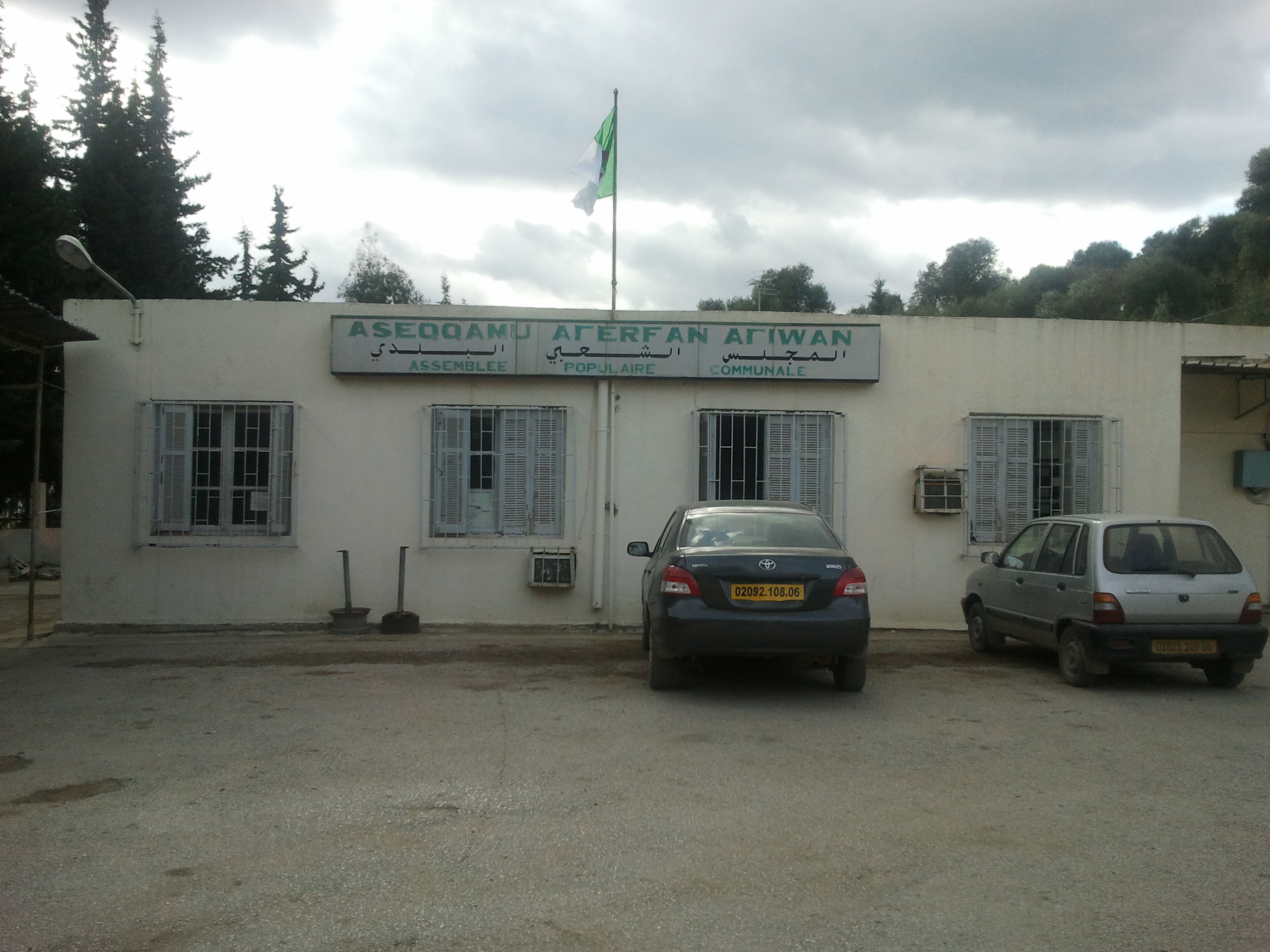
- Interactive map of Fenaia Il Maten
- Country: Algeria
- Province: Bejaia
- Time zone: UTC+1 (West Africa Time)

Fenaia Il Maten or Ifenain Ilmathen (Kabyle: Ifnayen), is a commune in northern Algeria in the Béjaïa Province. The Béni Mansour–Bejaïa railway traverses this community.
