= Aït Rizine =

Aït-Rizine At Rzin (Kabyle)
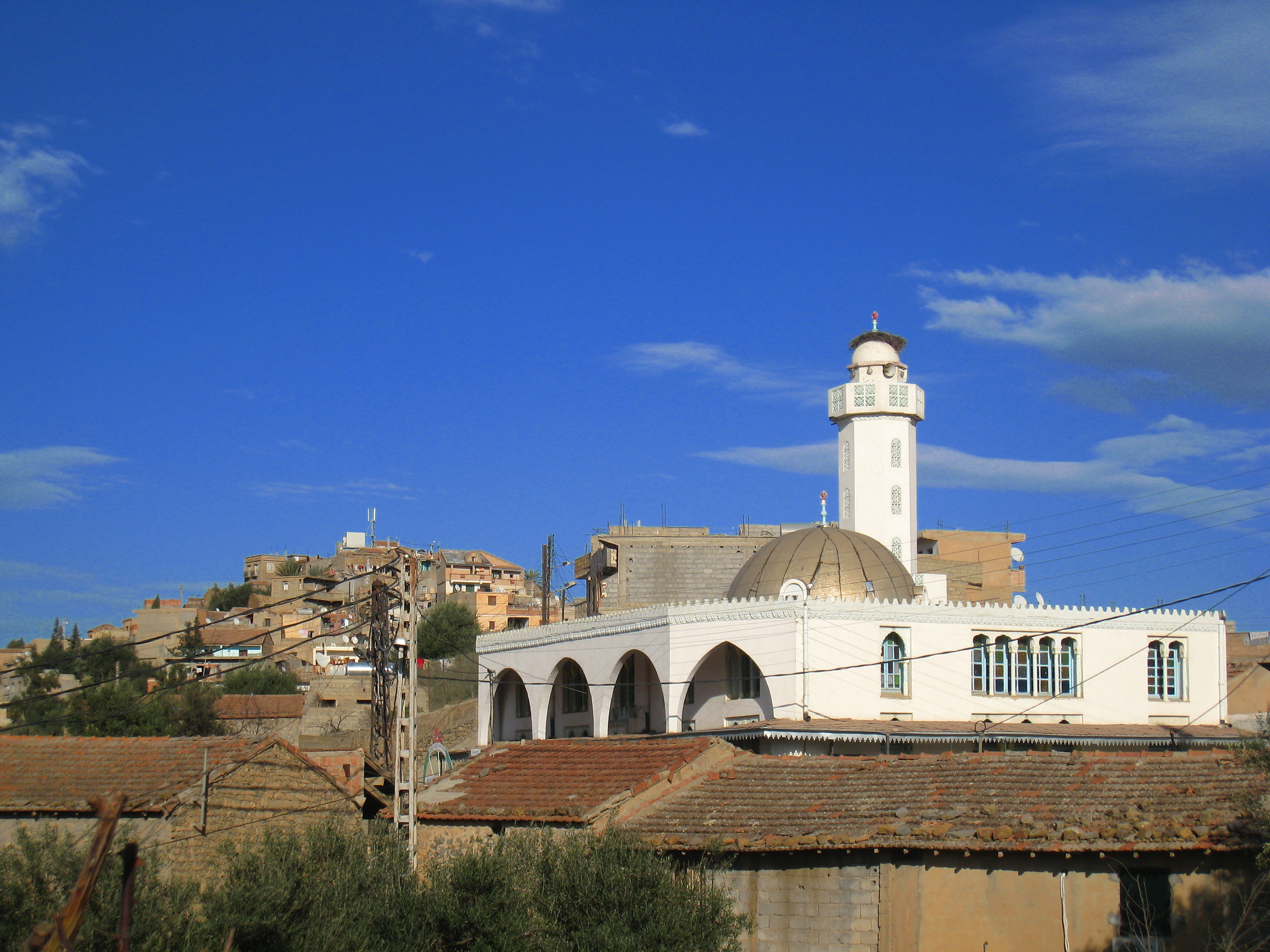

- Location within Algeria
- Coordinates: 36.37034683258125°N 4.486767873451462°E
- Country: Algeria
- Province: Bejaia
- Time zone: UTC+1 (West Africa Time)

Aït-Rizine or Aït R'zine (Kabyle: At Rzin) is a commune in northern Algeria in the Béjaïa Province.
