= Tibane =

Tibane Ḍiban (Kabyle)
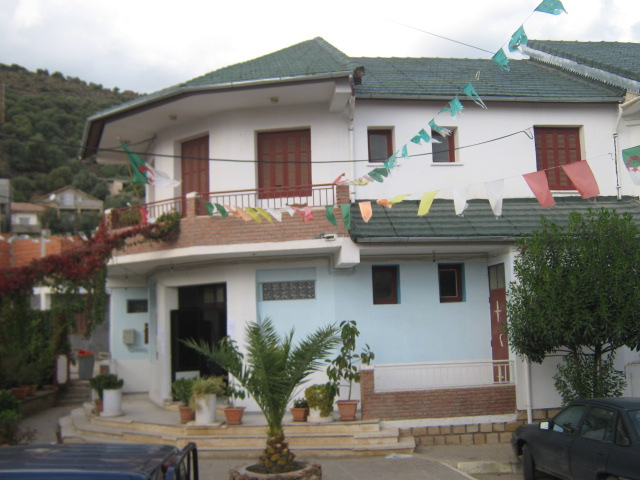
- Interactive map of Tibane
- Country: Algeria
- Province: Béjaïa
- Time zone: UTC+1 (West Africa Time)

Tibane (Kabyle: Ḍiban) is a commune in northern Algeria in the Béjaïa Province.

== Demographics ==
As of 2008 it had a registered population of 5048 inhabitants.
