= Adekar =

- Commune
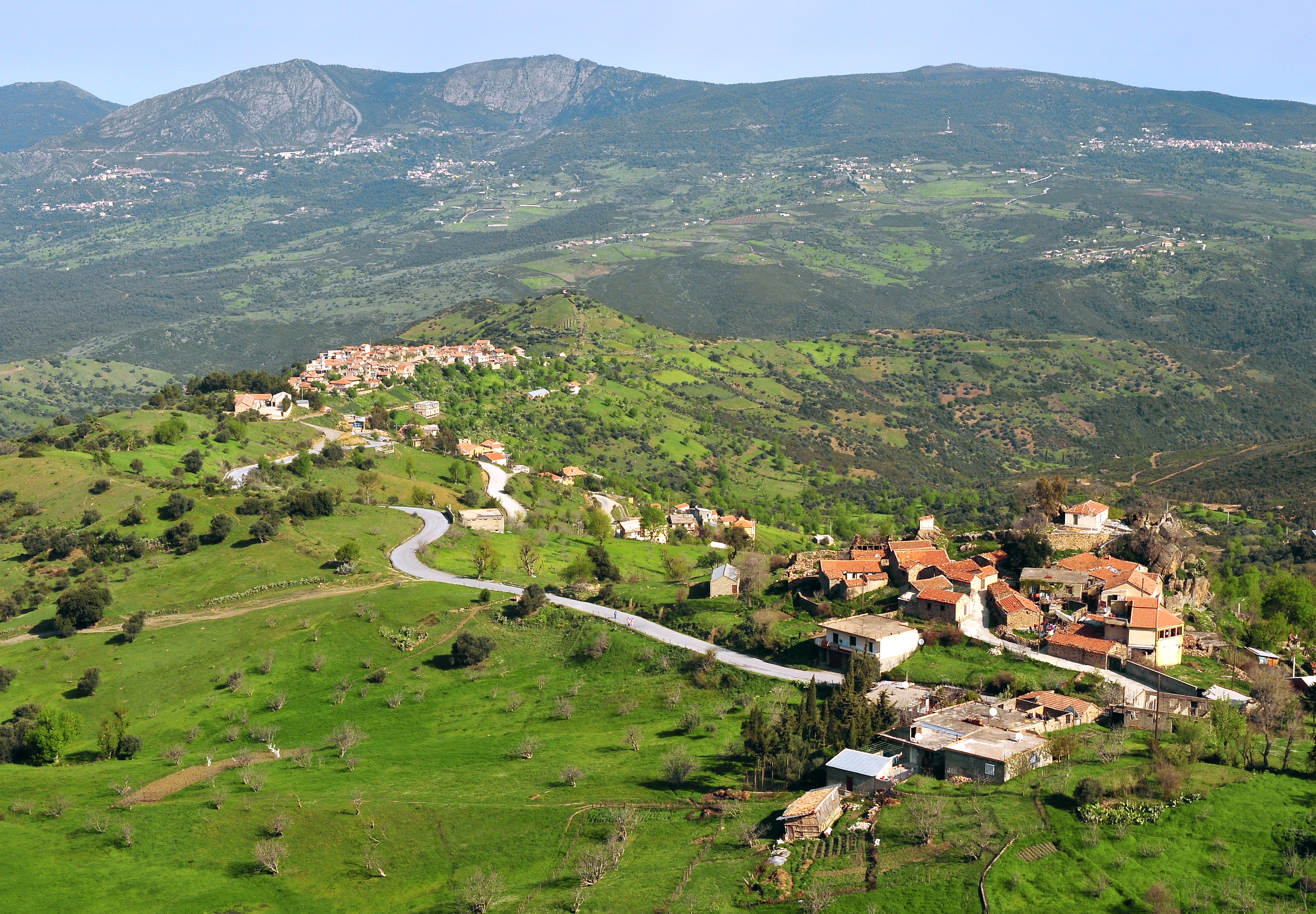

- Location within Algeria
- Coordinates: 36°41′N 4°40′E
- Country: Algeria
- Province: Béjaïa

Population (2000)
  - Total: 14,552
- Time zone: UTC+1 (West Africa Time)

Adekar is a commune in northern Algeria in the Béjaïa Province. In April 2008, it had a population of 13,067 inhabitants.

== Geography ==
It contains the settlements of Adekar, Ali-Thoum, Tizi Lqarne, Djebla, Kebouche, Tizi Ougueni, Ighil Laqrun, Timri Mahmoud, Mechnouh, Ikhetaben, Halafa, Thighzert, Thimri Mahmoud, Thazrut, Hanguedh, Ait Malek, Hriz, Kiria, Ait Yahia Youcef, Aoughled, Ait Maamar, Ait yidir, Aguemoun, Iksilen, Ighzer Abas, Thakamra. Grounia, Hathou, Tala Hemdoun and Jebroune.
