= Beni Ksila =

Commune in Algeria

Beni Ksila Iksilen (Kabyle)
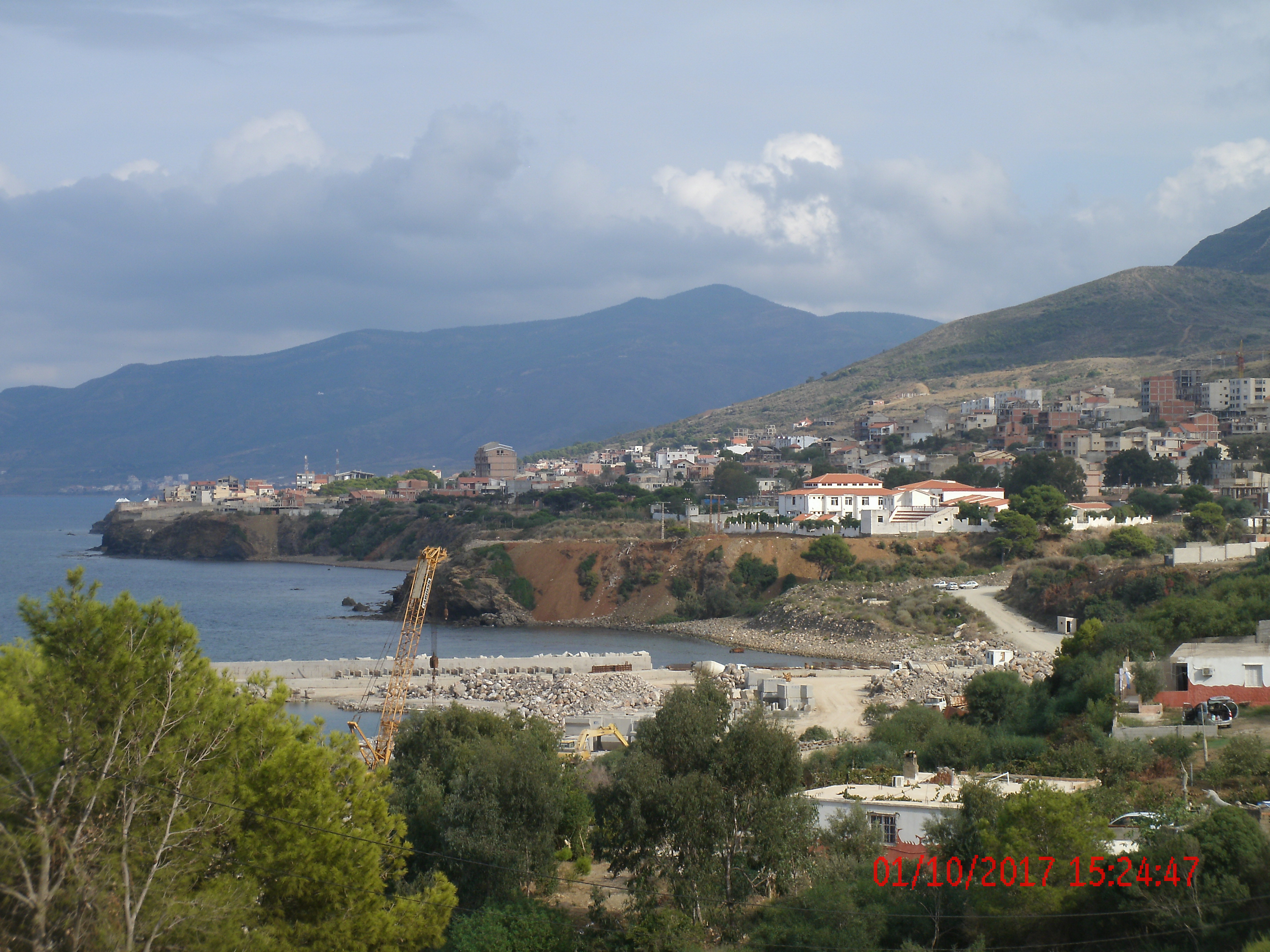

- Location within Algeria
- Country: Algeria
- Province: Bejaia
- Time zone: UTC+1 (West Africa Time)

Beni Ksila or Ait Ksila (Kabyle: Iksilen) is a commune in northern Algeria in the Béjaïa Province.
