= Tala Hamza =

Tala Hamza Tala Ḥemza (Kabyle)
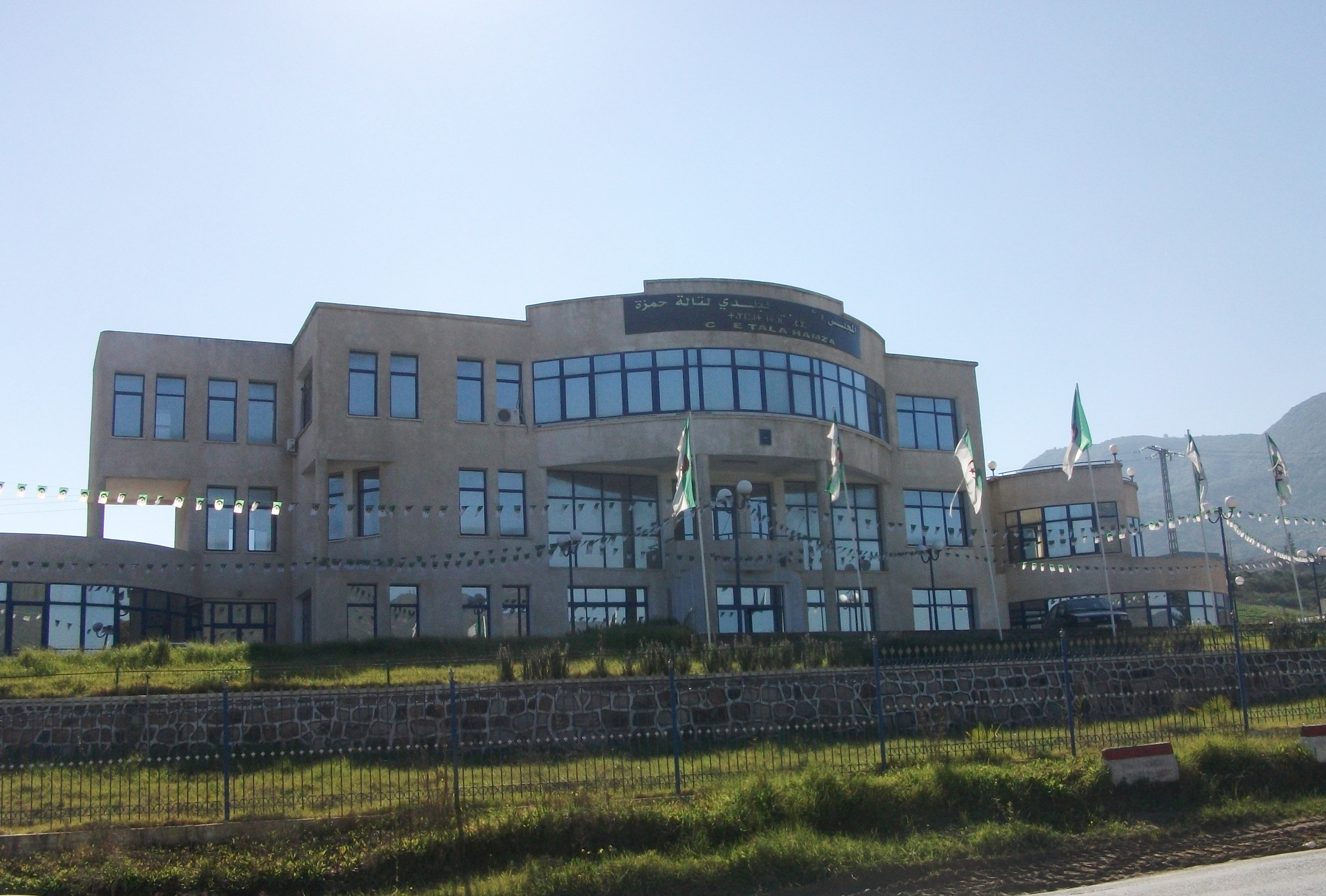
- Tala Hamza

- Location within Algeria
- Coordinates: 36°42′19″N 5°2′15″E
- Country: Algeria
- Province: Béjaïa

Population
  - Total: 11,675
- Time zone: UTC+1 (West Africa Time)

Tala Hamza (Kabyle: Tala Ḥemza; Arabic: تالة حمزة) is a town in northern Algeria in the Béjaïa Province.
