= Béjaïa Province =

Province of Algeria

Béjaïa Province Tawilayt n Bgayet
- Province
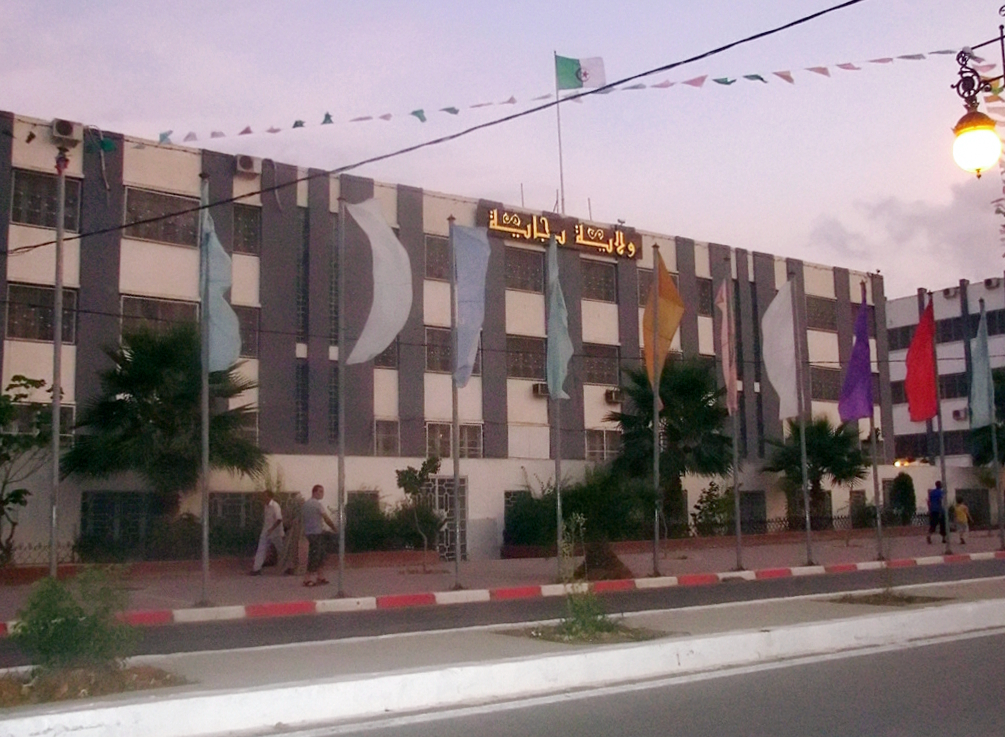

- Map of Algeria highlighting Béjaïa
- Coordinates: 36°45′N 5°04′E
- Country: Algeria
- Capital: Béjaïa

Government
  - PPA president: Mohamed Bettache (FLN)
  - Wāli: Ali Bedrici

Area
  - Total: 3,268 km^{2} (1,262 sq mi)

Population (2008)
  - Total: 915,835
  - Density: 280.2/km^{2} (725.8/sq mi)
- Time zone: UTC+01 (CET)
- Area code: +213 (0) 34
- ISO 3166 code: DZ-06
- Districts: 19
- Municipalities: 52
- Website: https://wilaya-bejaia.dz/

The Béjaïa Province (Kabyle: Tawilayt n Bgayet, Arabic: ولاية بجاية, Wilāyat Bijāyah) is a province of Algeria in the Kabylie region. Its population was 984,050 inhabitants in 2019, with a density of 305 km^{2}. The province's capital city is Béjaïa, the terminus of the Béni Mansour–Bejaïa railway.

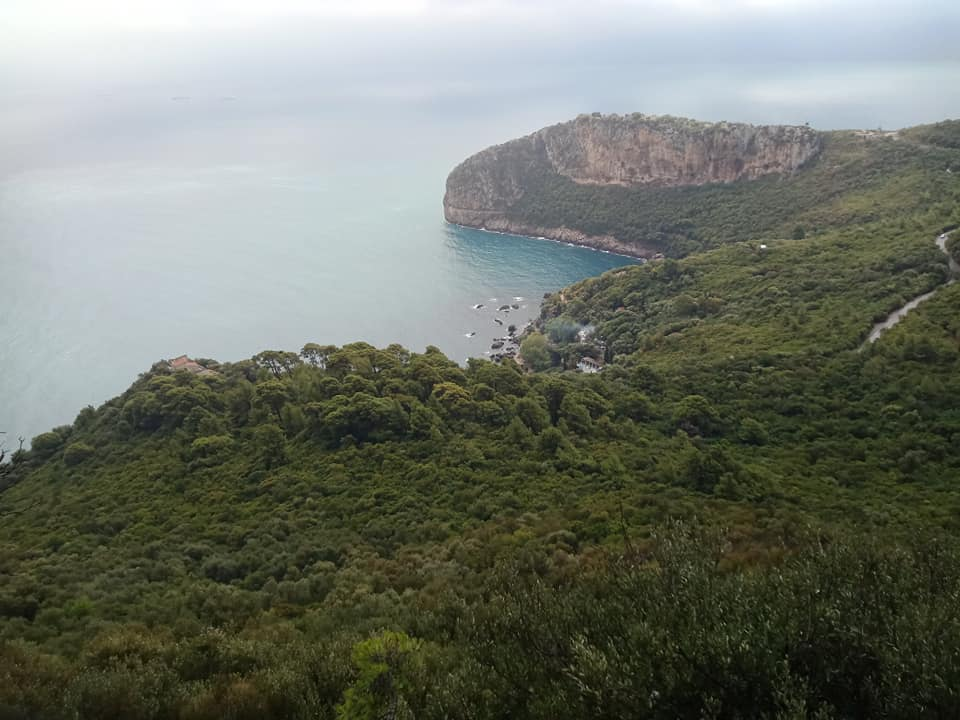
Coast of Bejaia Province

Gouraya National Park is located in Béjaïa Province. A population of an endangered primate species, the Barbary macaque, is found within the park; this primate has a severely restricted and disjunctive range.

== History ==
The province was created by the Sétif in 1974.

== Administrative divisions ==
The province is divided into 19 districts (daïras), which are further divided into 52 communes or municipalities.

=== Districts ===
1. Adekar
2. Akbou
3. Amizour
4. Aokas
5. Barbacha
6. Béjaïa
7. Béni Maouche
8. Chemini
9. Darguina
10. El Kseur
11. Ifri-Ouzellaguen
12. Ighil Ali
13. Kherrata
14. Seddouk
15. Sidi Aïch
16. Souk El Tenine
17. Tazmalt
18. Tichy
19. Timezrit

=== Communes ===
1. Adekar
2. Aït-Rizine
3. Aït Smaïl
4. Akbou
5. Akfadou
6. Amalou
7. Amizour
8. Aokas
9. Barbacha
10. Béjaïa
11. Beni Djellil
12. Beni Ksila
13. Beni Maouche
14. Beni Mellikeche
15. Boudjellil
16. Bouhamza
17. Boukhelifa
18. Chelata
19. Chemini
20. Darguina
21. Draâ El-Kaïd
22. El-Flaye
23. El Kseur
24. Feraoun
25. Ifenain Ilmathen
26. Ighil Ali
27. Ighram
28. Kendira
29. Kherrata
30. Melbou
31. Mecisna
32. Oued Ghir
33. Ouzellaguen
34. Seddouk
35. Semaoune
36. Sidi Aïch
37. Sidi-Ayad
38. Sidi-Saïd
39. Souk El-Thenine
40. Souk-Oufella
41. Tala Hamza
42. Tamokra
43. Tamridjet
44. Taourirt Ighil
45. Taskriout
46. Tazmalt
47. Tinabdher
48. Tibane
49. Tichy
50. Tifra
51. Timezrit
52. Tizi N'Berber
53. Toudja

Timezrit, also known as At Yemmel in the past, was the main town of the Ait Immel.
