= Chelata =

Chelata Icellaḍen (Kabyle)
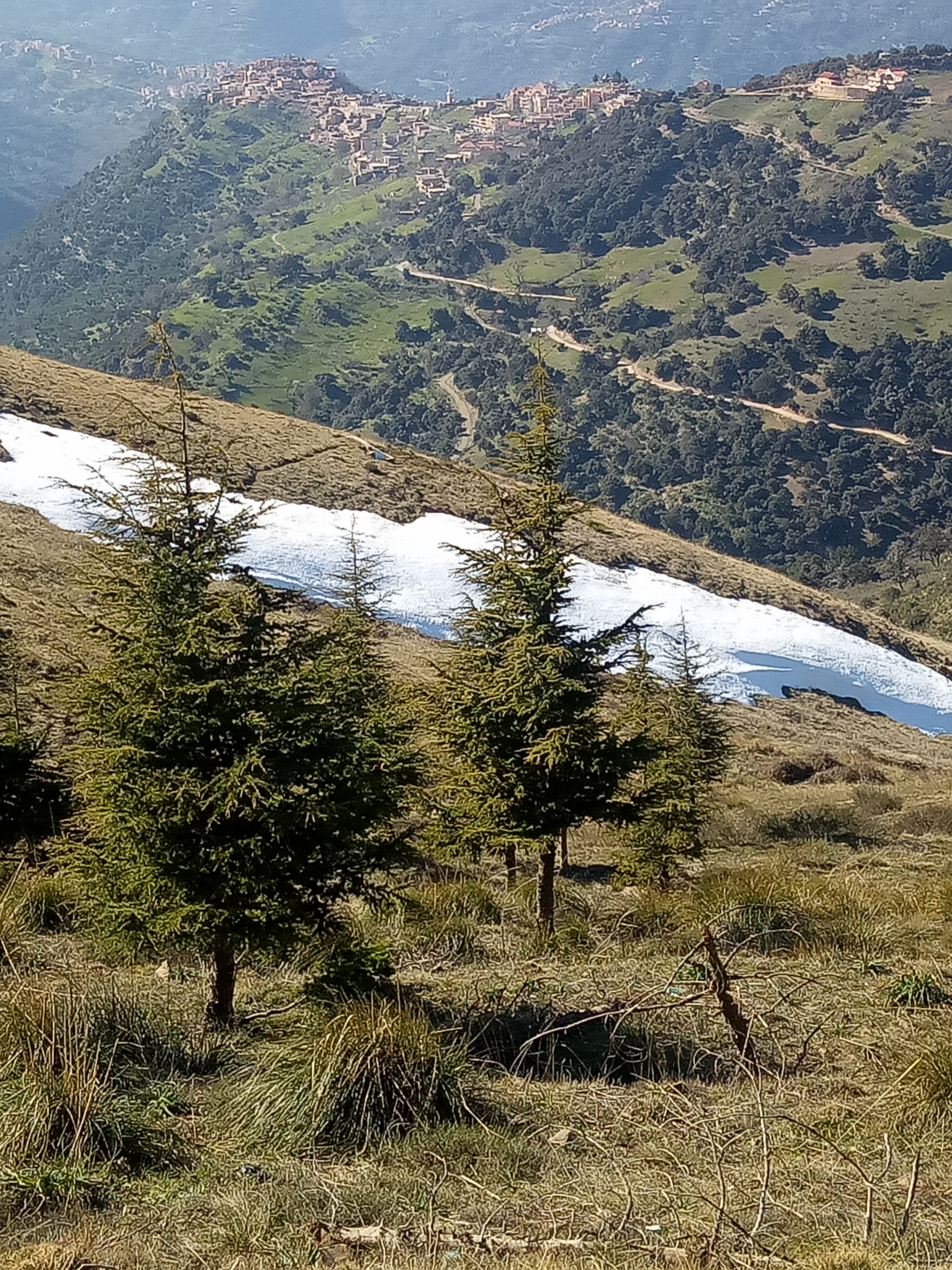

- Location within Algeria
- Coordinates: 36.51944°N 4.4975°E
- Country: Algeria
- Province: Béjaïa
- Time zone: UTC+1 (West Africa Time)

Chelata (Kabyle: Icellaḍen) is a commune in northern Algeria in the Béjaïa Province in the Kabylia region.
