= Aït Smaïl =

Aït Smaïl Ayt Smaɛel (Kabyle)
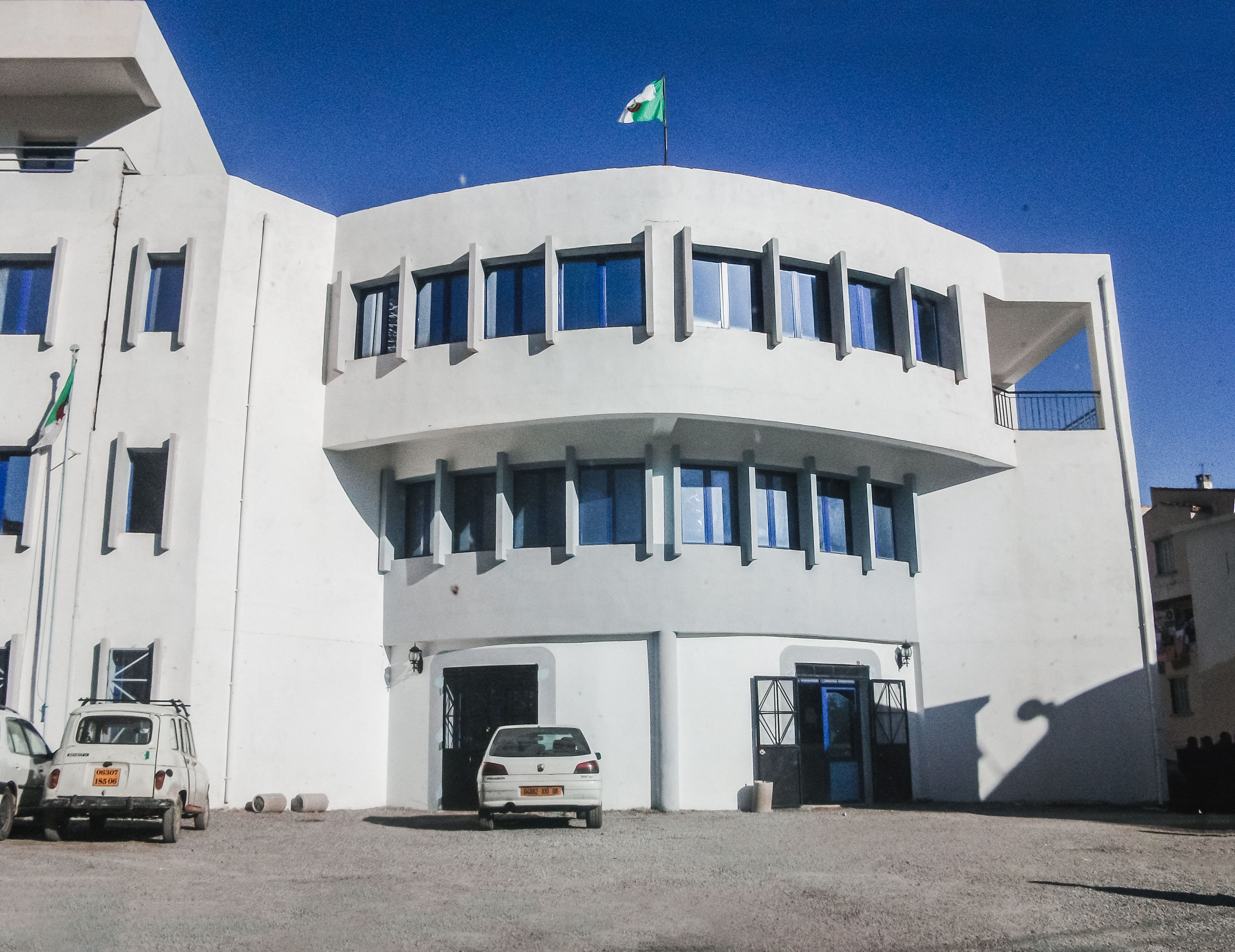

- Location within Algeria
- Coordinates: 36°44′N 4°51′E
- Country: Algeria
- Province: Bejaia
- Time zone: UTC+1 (West Africa Time)

Aït Smaïl (Kabyle: Ayt Smaɛel) is a commune in northern Algeria in the Béjaïa Province, which has a Mediterranean, hot summer climate.
