= Semaoune =

Coordinates: 36°37′N 4°48′E

Semaoune Semɛun (Kabyle)
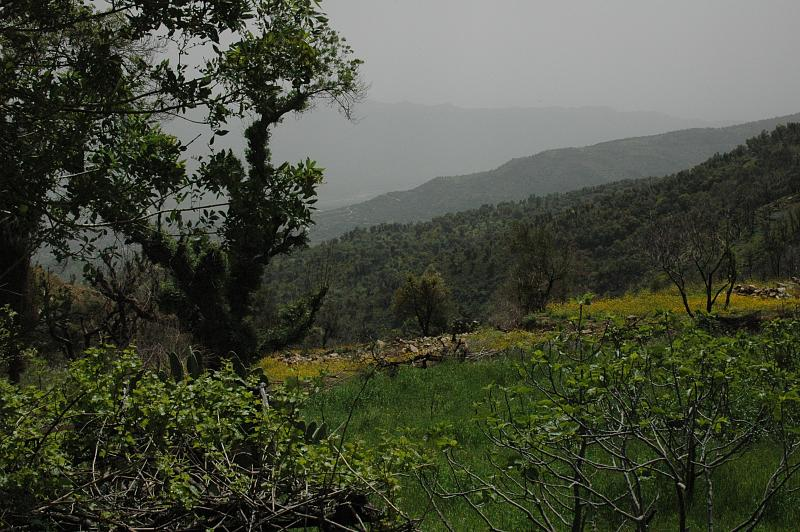

- Location within Algeria
- Country: Algeria
- Province: Béjaïa
- Time zone: UTC+1 (West Africa Time)

Semaoune (Kabyle: Semɛun) is a commune in northern Algeria in the Béjaïa Province. The settlement had a population of 13,616 in 2008.
