= Taourirt Ighil =

Coordinates: 36°42′N 4°42′E

Taourit Ighil Tawrirt n Yiɣil (Kabyle)

- Location within Algeria
- Country: Algeria
- Province: Béjaïa
- Time zone: UTC+1 (West Africa Time)

Taourit Ighil (Kabyle: Tawrirt n Yiɣil) is a commune of northern Algeria located in the Béjaïa Province, in Kabylia.
