= Oued Ghir =

Coordinates: 36°42′N 4°59′E

Oued Ghir Wad Ɣir (Kabyle)
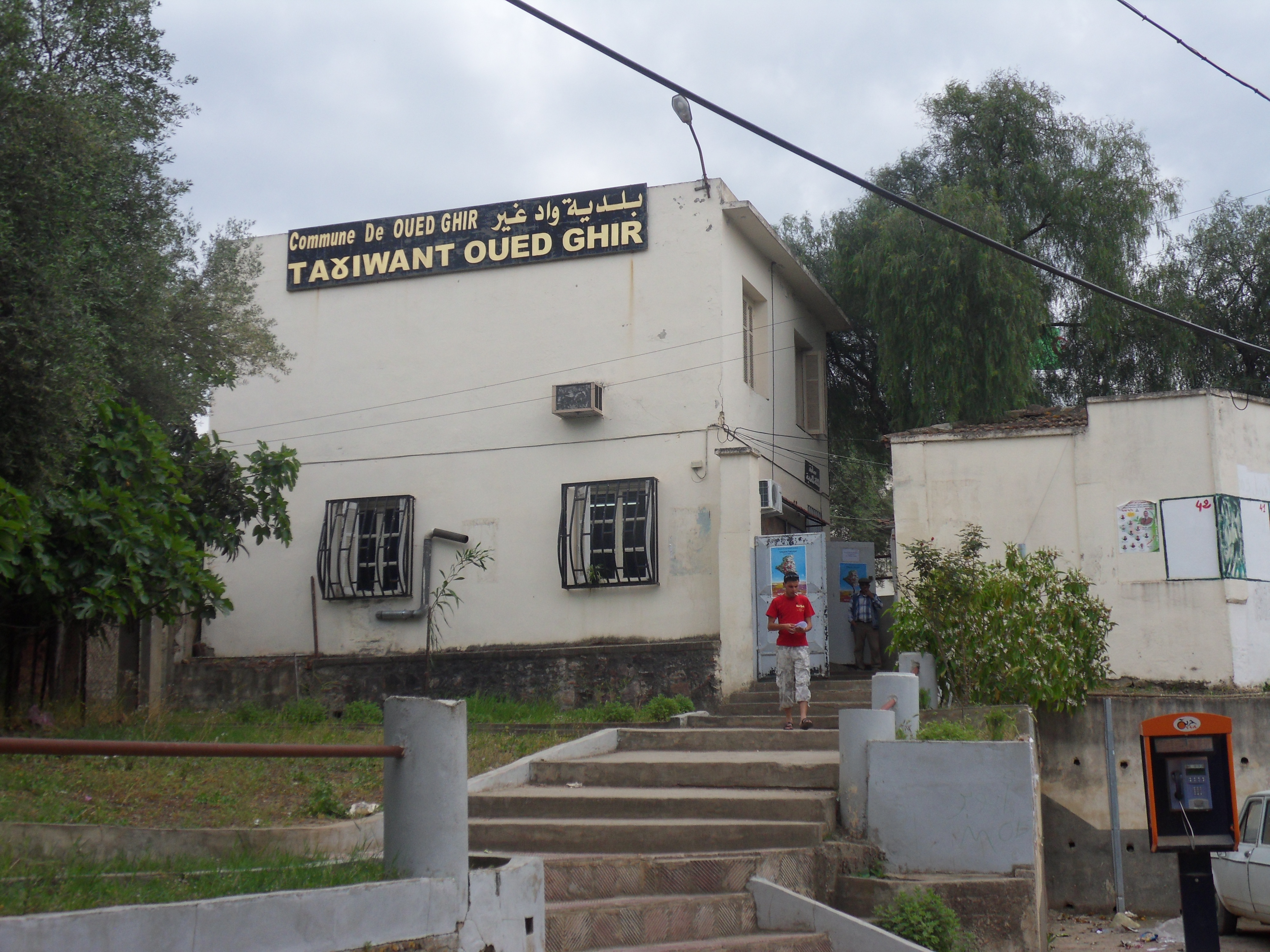

- Country: Algeria
- Province: Béjaïa
- Time zone: UTC+1 (West Africa Time)

Oued Ghir (Kabyle: Wad Ɣir) is a commune in northern Algeria in the Béjaïa Province.

The Béni Mansour–Bejaïa railway traverses this community.
