= Melbou =

Melbou Melbu, ⵎⴻⵍⴱⵓ (Kabyle)
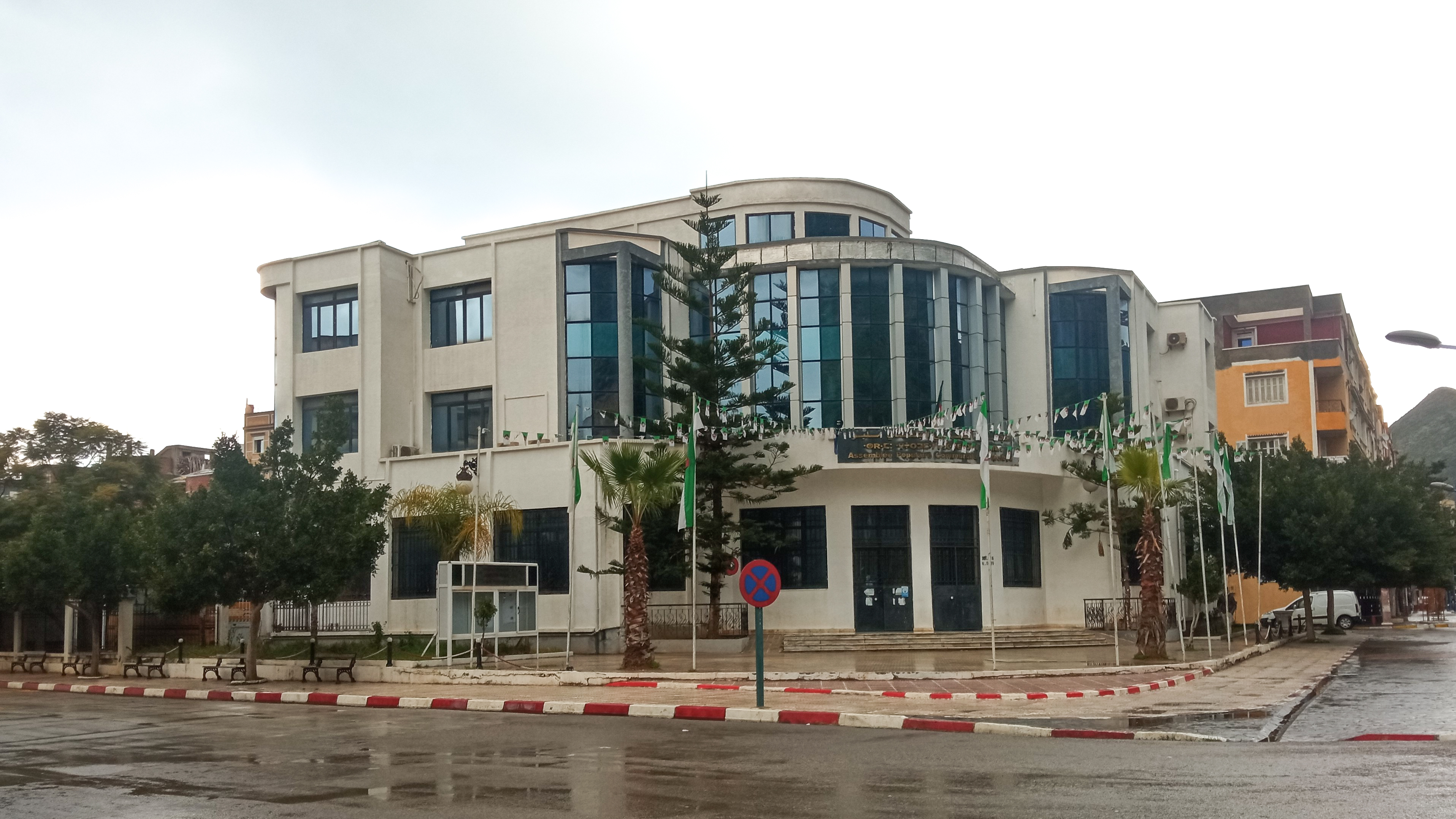

- Location within Algeria
- Coordinates: 36.639645°N 5.360759°E
- Country: Algeria
- Province: Béjaïa
- Time zone: UTC+1 (West Africa Time)

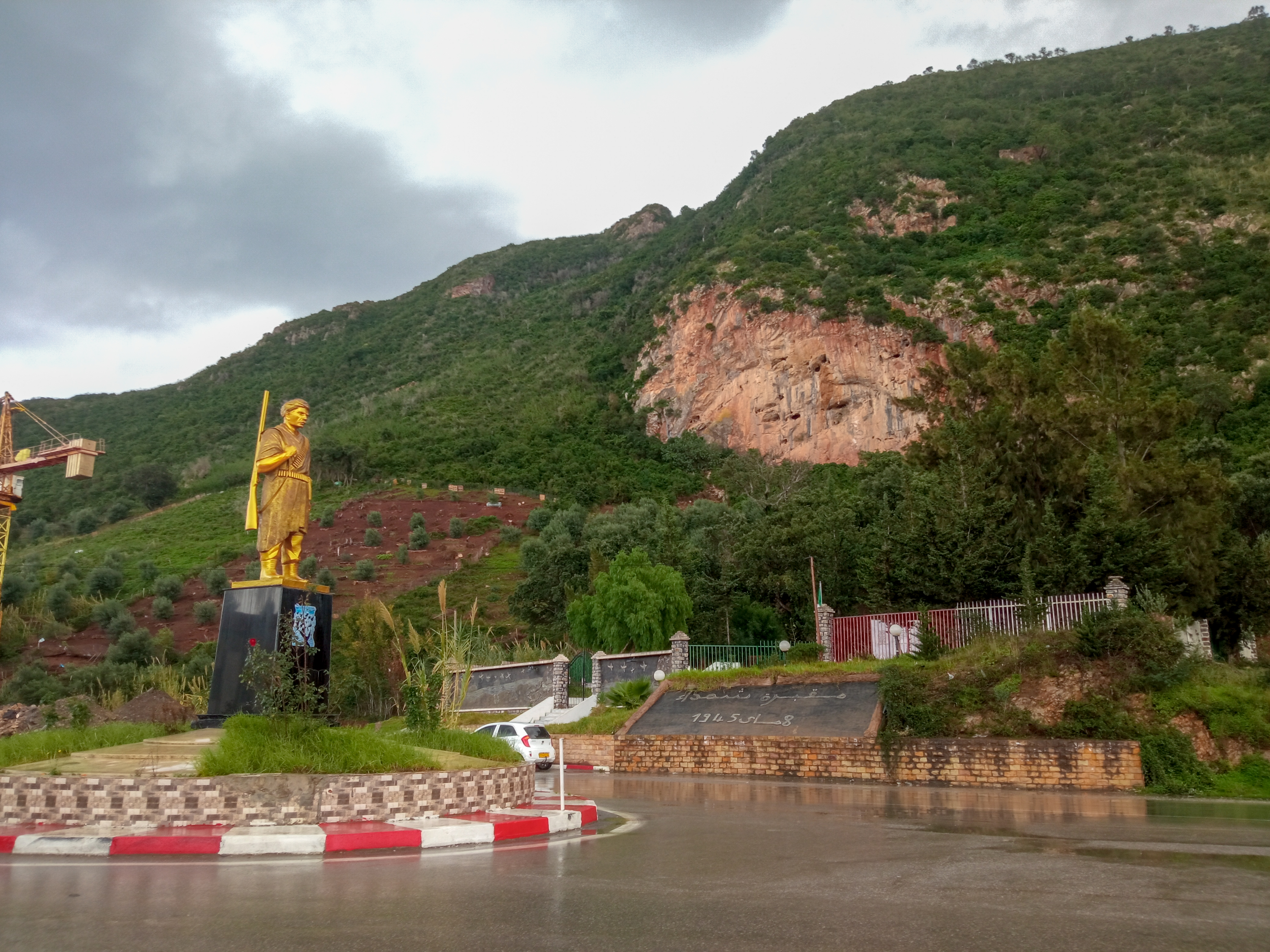
8 May 1945 (Melbou)

Melbou (Kabyle: Melbu, ⵎⴻⵍⴱⵓ; Arabic: ملبو) is a commune in northern Algeria in the Béjaïa Province.
