= Tamridjet =

Coordinates: 36°34′19″N 5°22′26″E

Tamridjet Tamrijt, ⵜⴰⵎⵔⵉⴵⵜ (Kabyle)
- Interactive map of Tamridjet
- Country: Algeria
- Province: Béjaïa
- Time zone: UTC+1 (West Africa Time)

Tamridjet (Kabyle: Tamrijt, ⵜⴰⵎⵔⵉⴵⵜ) is a town in northern Algeria. It is in the Souk El Tenine District of Béjaïa Province.
