= Draâ El-Kaïd =

Draâ El-Kaïd Draɛ Lqayed (Kabyle)
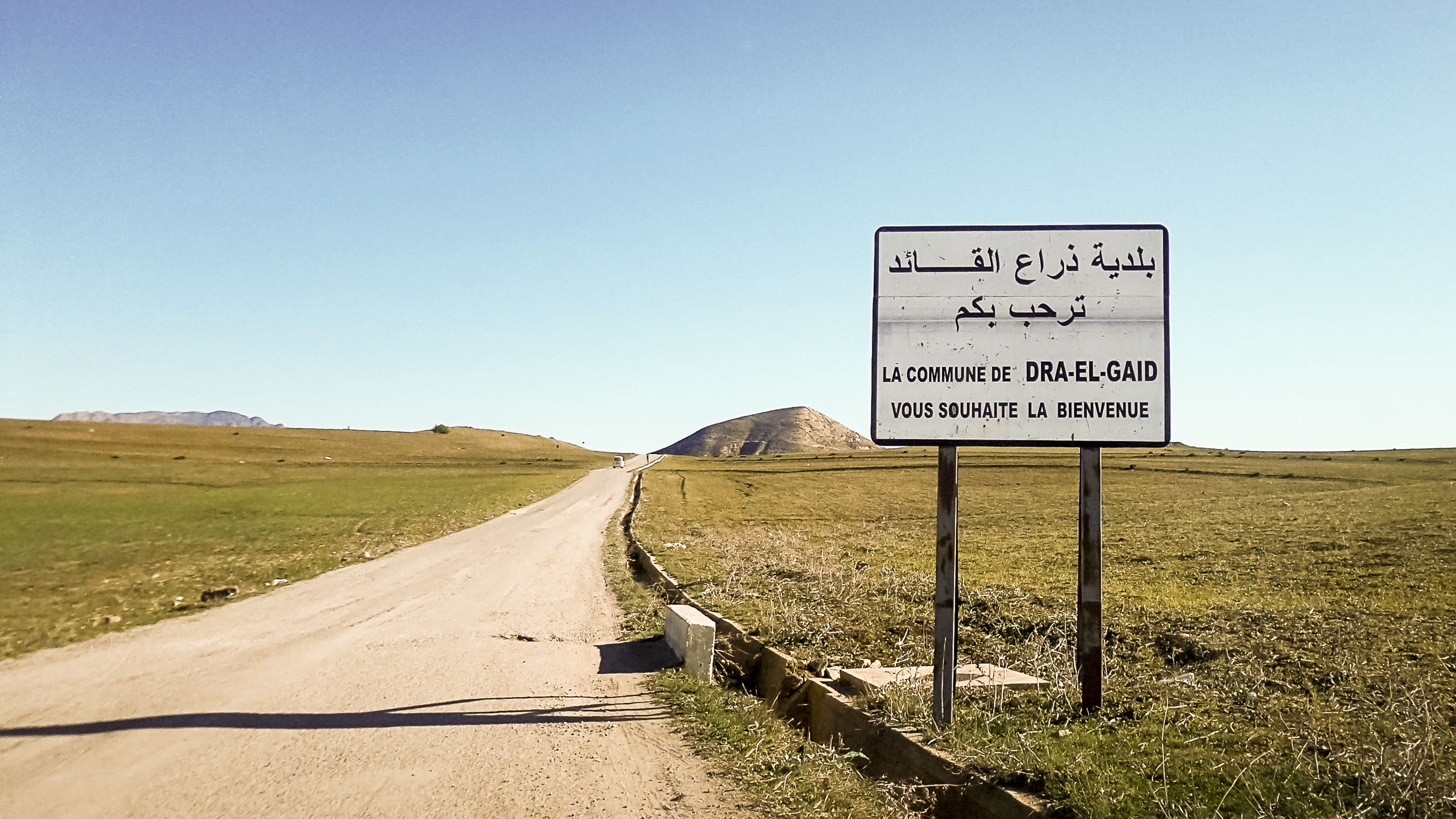

- Location within Algeria
- Country: Algeria
- Province: Bejaia
- Time zone: UTC+1 (West Africa Time)

Draâ El-Kaïd (Kabyle: Draɛ Lqayed) is a commune in northern Algeria in the Béjaïa Province.
