= Darguina =

Darguina Iderginen (Kabyle)
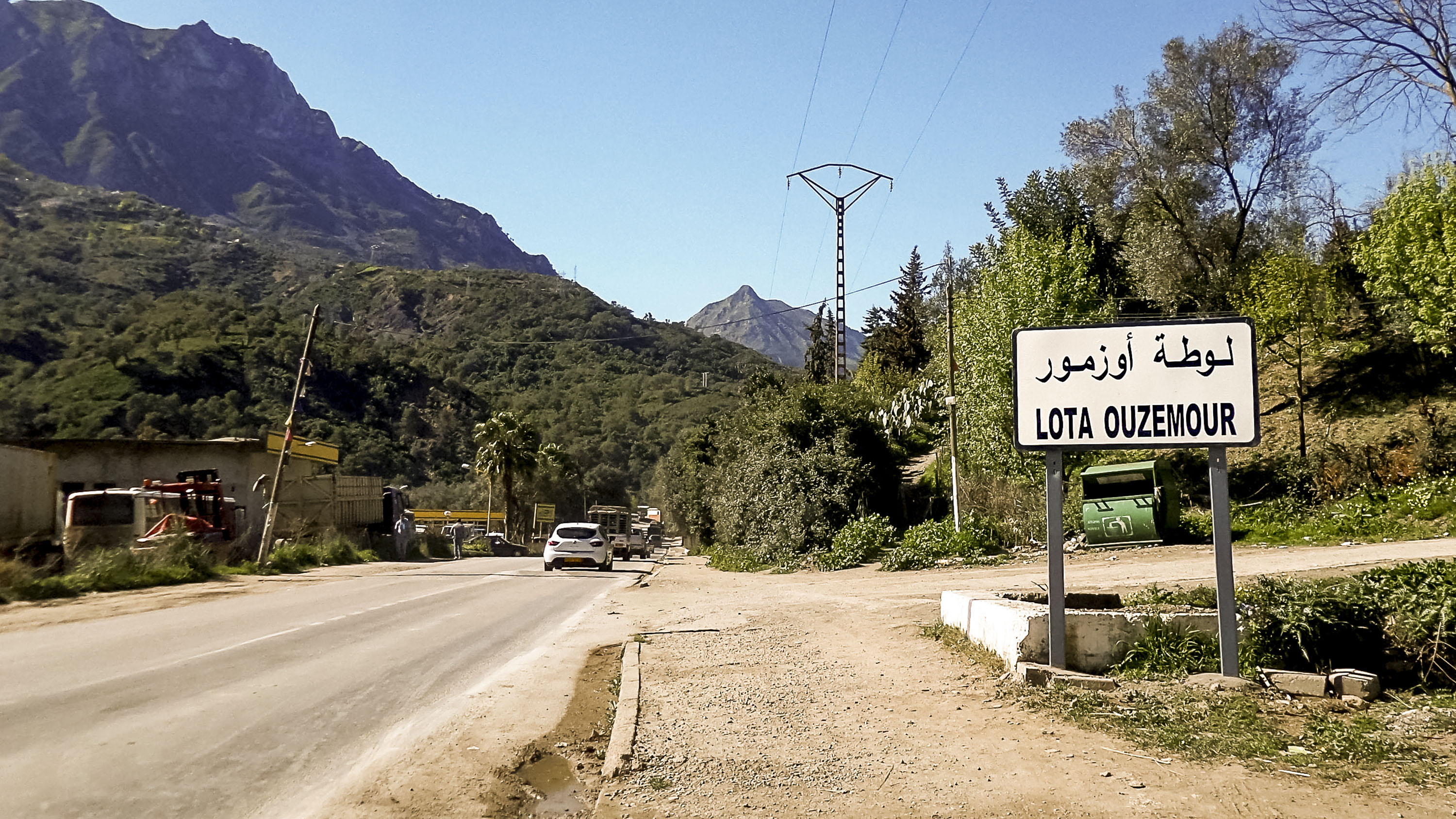

- Location within Algeria
- Country: Algeria
- Province: Bejaia
- Time zone: UTC+1 (West Africa Time)

Darguina (Kabyle: Iderginen) is a commune in northern Algeria in the Béjaïa Province.
