= Ouzellaguen =

Coordinates: 36°32′31″N 4°36′46″E

Ouzellaguen Uzellagen (Kabyle)
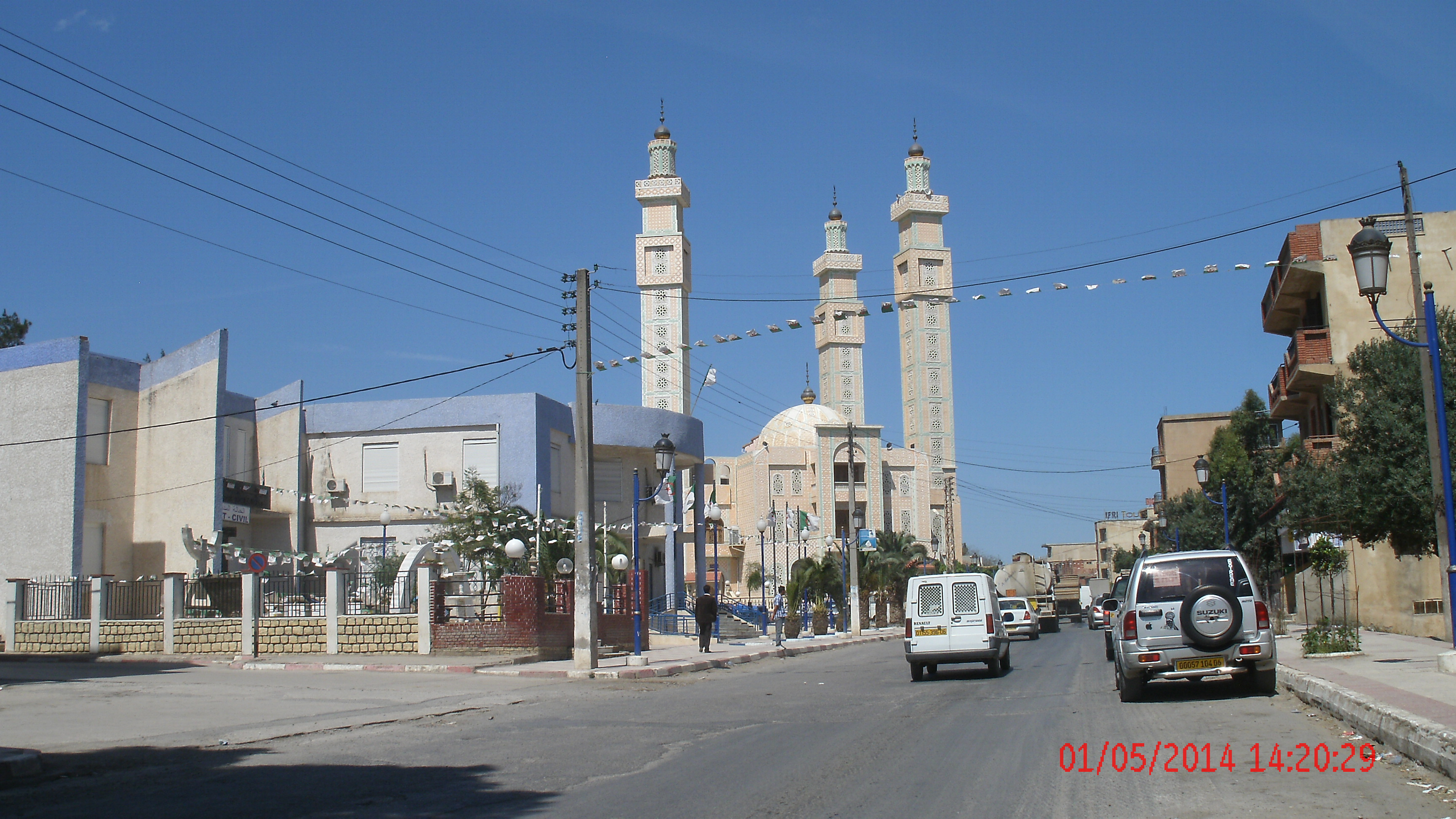
- Interactive map of Ouzellaguen
- Country: Algeria
- Province: Béjaïa
- Time zone: UTC+1 (West Africa Time)

Ouzellaguen (Kabyle: Uzellagen) is a commune in northern Algeria in the Béjaïa Province in the Kabylia region. The Béni Mansour–Bejaïa railway serves this community.
