= Beni Mellikeche =

Coordinates: 36°26′N 4°24′E

Beni Mellikeche At Mlikec (Kabyle) Aït Mellikeche

- Location within Algeria
- Country: Algeria
- Province: Bejaia
- Time zone: UTC+1 (West Africa Time)

Beni Mellikeche or Aït Mellikeche (Kabyle: At Mlikec) is a commune in northern Algeria in the Béjaïa Province.

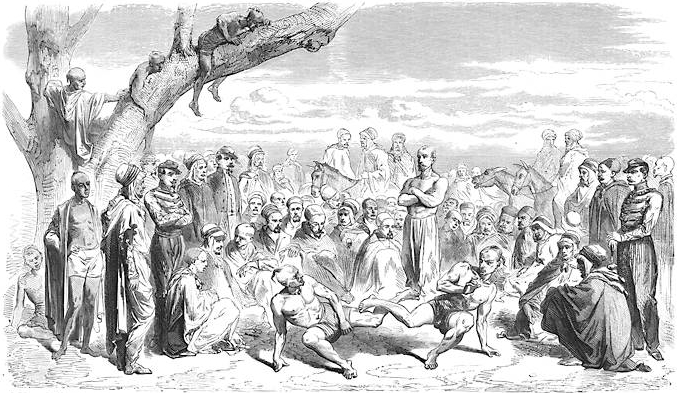
Tribe of Beni Mellikech in Kabylia, 1857, end of the Kabyle resistance to the French conquest of Algeria.
