= Souk El-Thenine =

Souk El Ténine Suq n Letnayen (Kabyle)
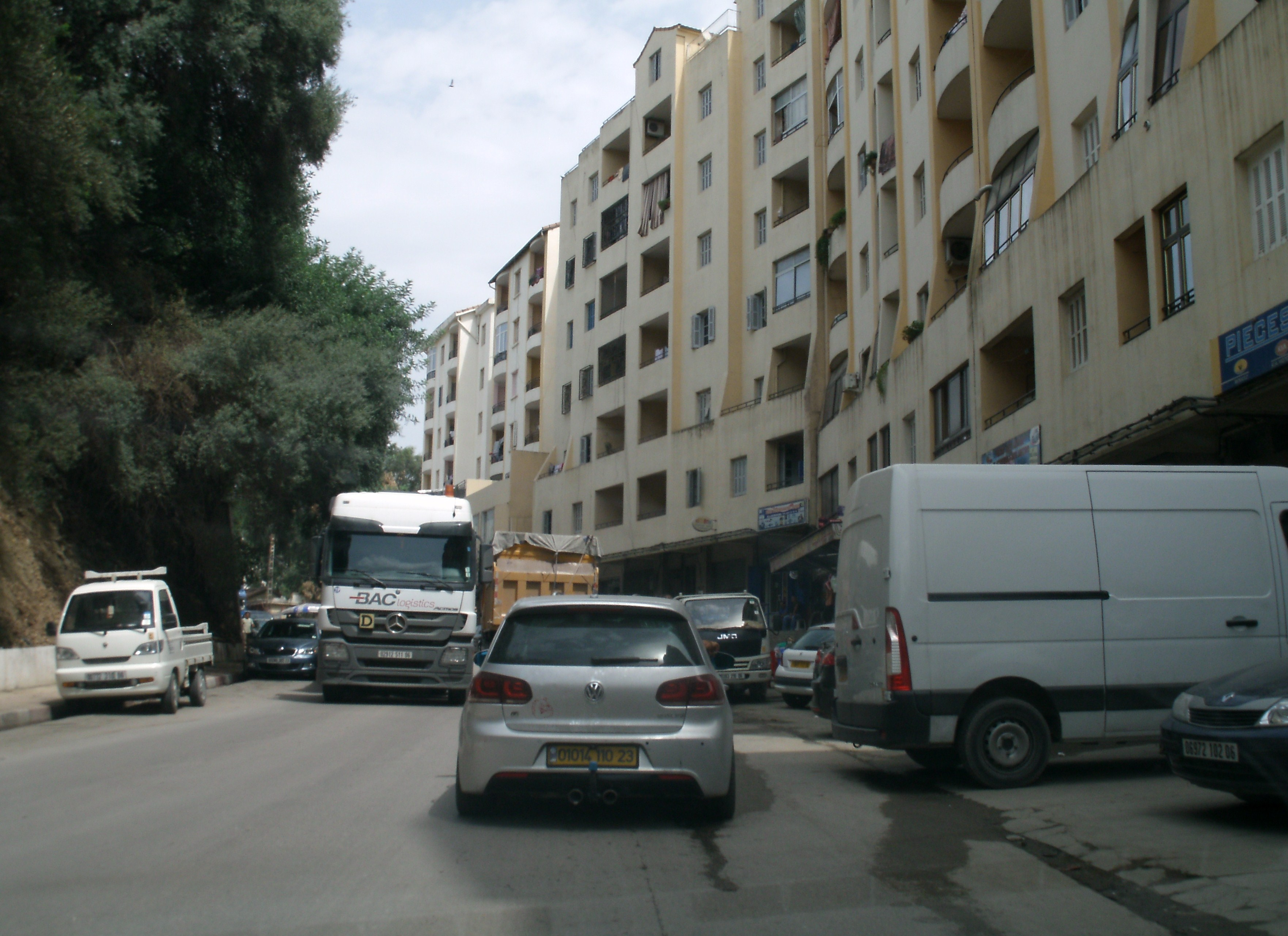

- Location within Algeria
- Country: Algeria
- Province: Béjaïa
- Time zone: UTC+1 (West Africa Time)

Souk El Ténine (Kabyle: Suq n Letnayen) is a commune of northern Algeria located in the Béjaïa Province, in Kabylia.
