= Taskriout =

Coordinates: 36°34′N 5°15′E

Taskriout Taskriwt (Kabyle)
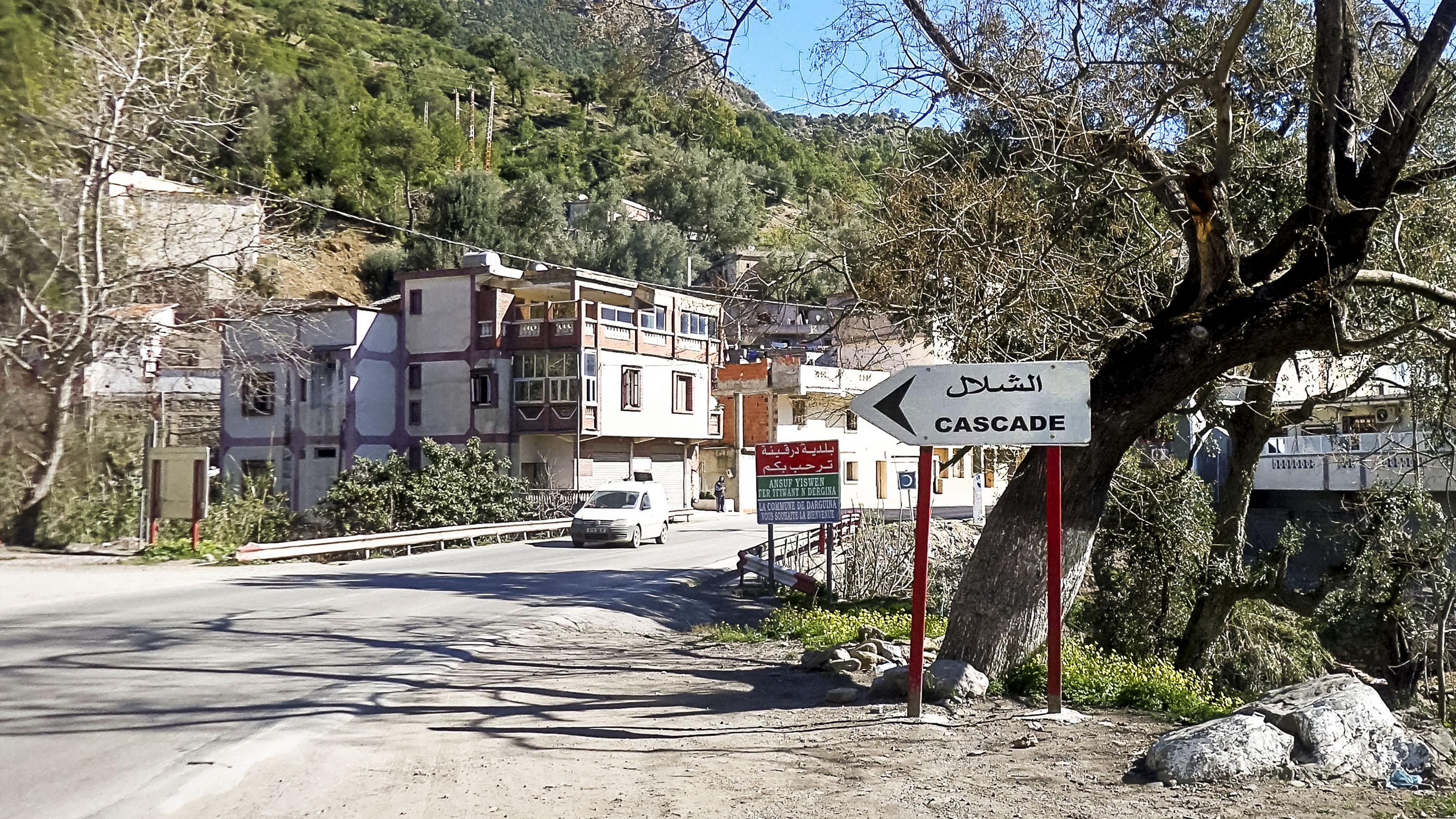
- Interactive map of Taskriout
- Country: Algeria
- Province: Béjaïa
- Time zone: UTC+1 (GMT+1)

Taskriout (Kabyle: Taskriwt) is a commune in northern Algeria in the Béjaïa Province.

== Geography ==
Taskriout is located in the southeast of the Bejaia Province, crossed by the National road N9, leading to Aït Smail, Kherrata, upwards Sétif. It consists of five villages; Aït Idriss, where Kefrida waterfall is situated, Aït Ali Oumhend, Aït Mbarek, Arrechah and Rif. Bordj Mira is the chief town. Taskriout appertain to the Darguina District.
