= Beni Djellil =

Beni Djellil Ath Jlil (Kabyle)
- Commune and town
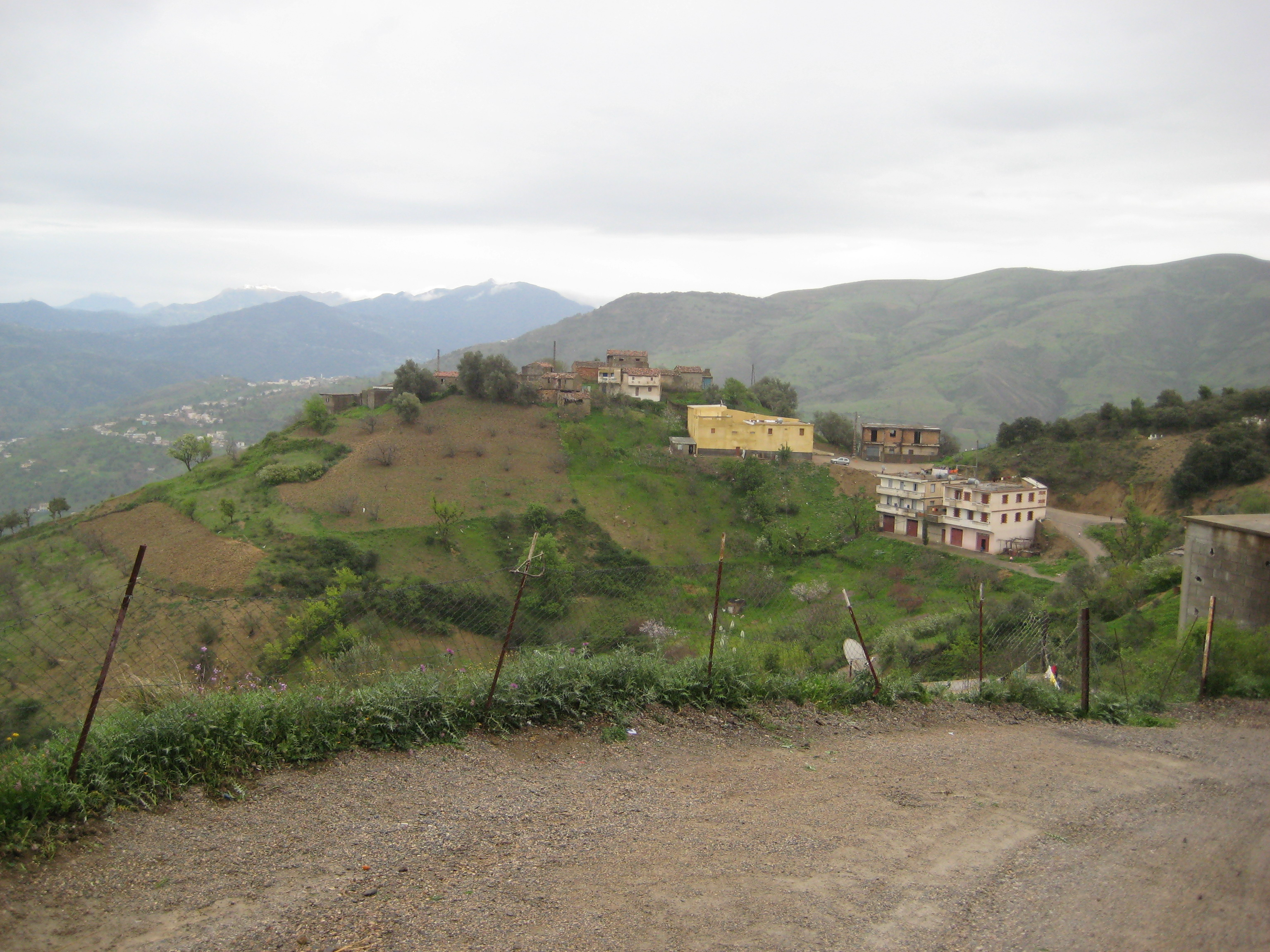

- Location within Algeria
- Coordinates: 36°33′50″N 4°47′41″E
- Country: Algeria
- Province: Bejaia

Population (2002)
  - Total: 8,983
- Time zone: UTC+1 (CET)

Beni Djellil or Aït Djellil (kabyle: Ath Jlil) is a commune in northern Algeria in the Béjaïa Province.
