= Tichy =

Tichy Ṭic̣c̣i (Kabyle)
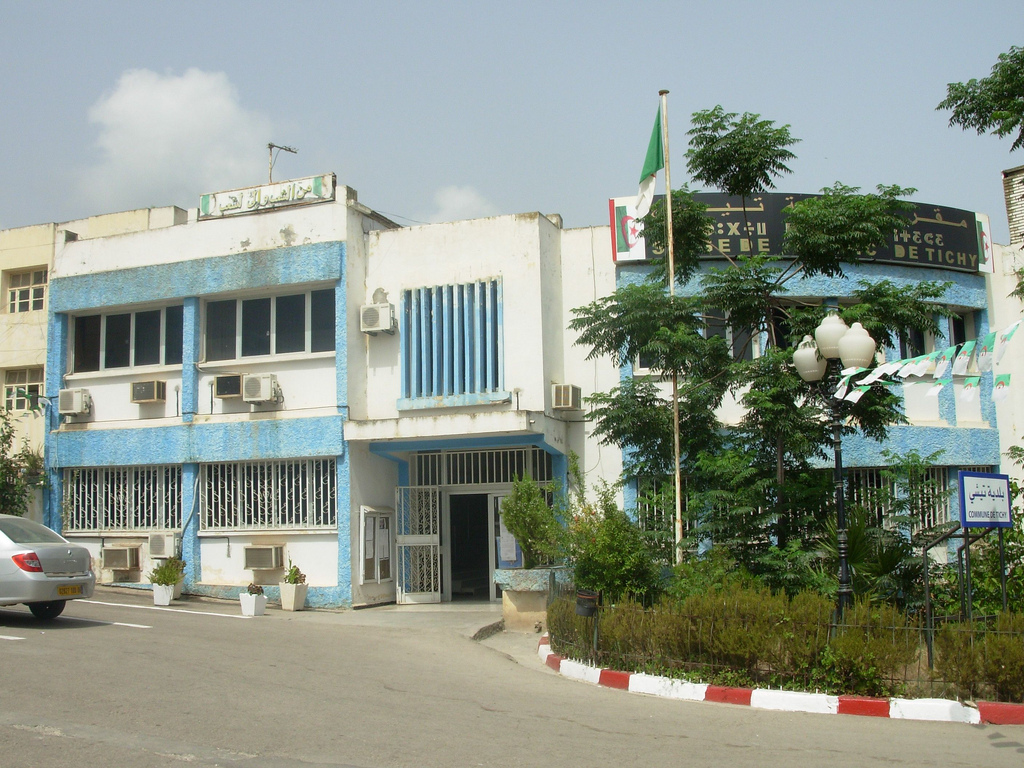
- Town Hall in Tichy

- Location within Algeria
- Coordinates: 36.667483°N 5.160085°E
- Country: Algeria
- Province: Béjaïa
- Time zone: UTC+1 (West Africa Time)

Tichy (Kabyle: Ṭic̣c̣i) is a commune in northern Algeria in the Béjaïa Province. It is a Kabyle community, and located about 15 km from Béjaïa. There is a tourist resort planned. It is known for its beaches.
