= Feraoun =

Feraoun Ferɛun (Kabyle)
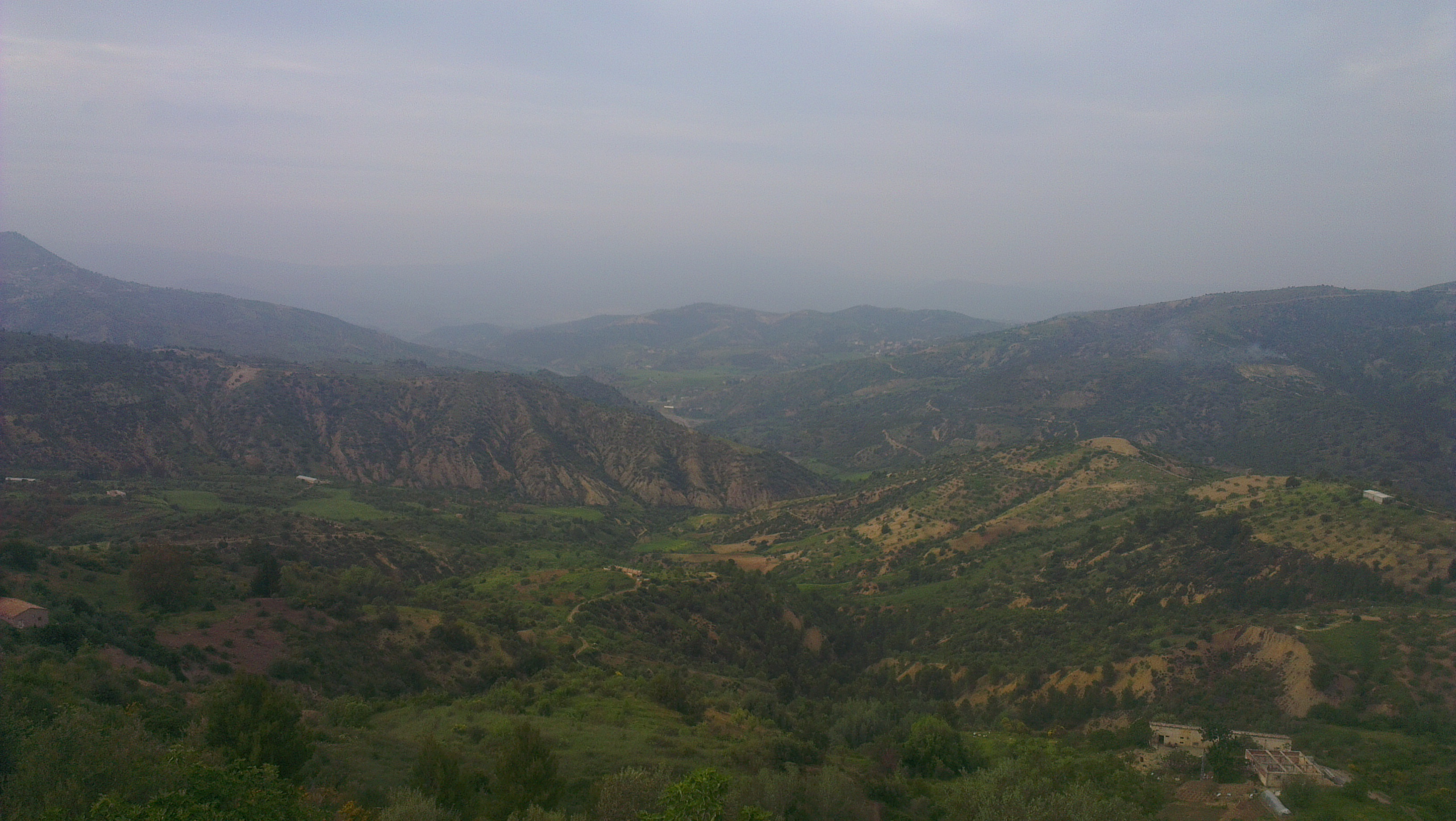

- Location of Ferraoun, Algeria within Béjaïa Province

- Location in Algeria
- Coordinates: 36°33′25″N 4°51′59″E
- Country: Algeria
- Province: Béjaïa
- Time zone: UTC+1 (West Africa Time)

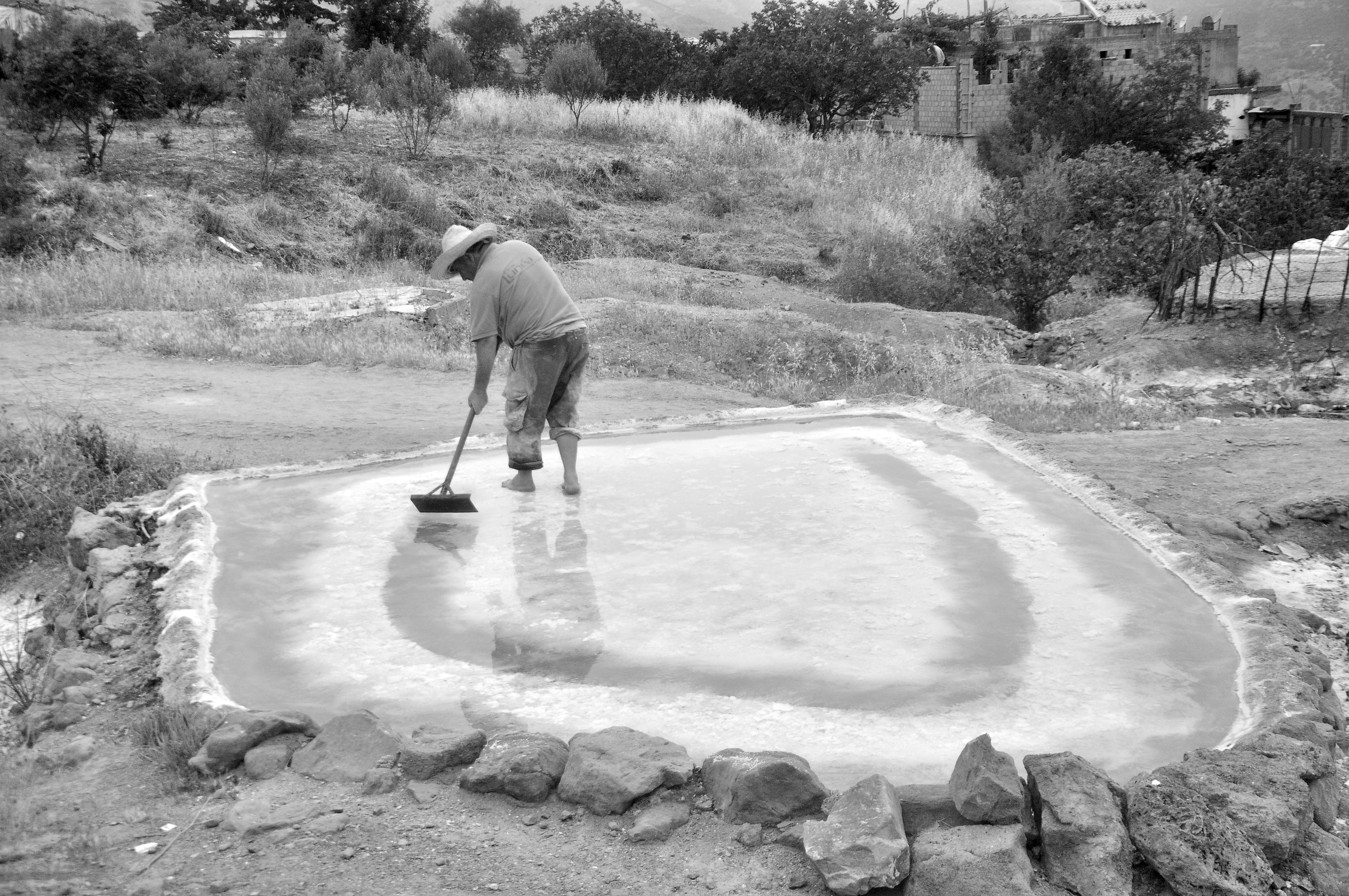
Salt worker in Ichekaven (Feraoun).

Feraoun (Kabyle: Ferɛun) is a commune in northern Algeria in the Béjaïa Province in the Kabylia region. It serves as the administrative center of the commune of Feraoun.
