= Tazmalt =

Tazmalt ⵜⴰⵣⵎⴰⵍⵜ
- town
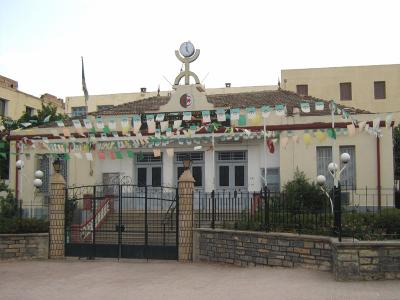

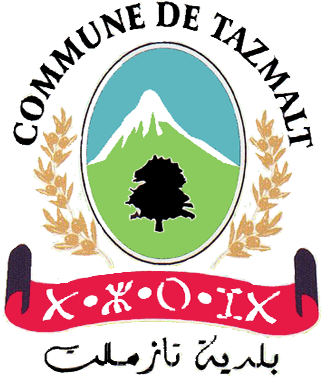
- Seal
- Nickname: Tazeradjt
- Algeria

- Location within Algeria
- Coordinates: 36°23′04″N 4°23′57″E
- Country: Algeria
- Province: Béjaïa

Area
  - Total: 33.64 km^{2} (12.99 sq mi)

Population (2008)
  - Total: 28,891
  - Density: 858.8/km^{2} (2,224/sq mi)
- Time zone: UTC+1 (West Africa Time)
- Postal codes: 06006

Tazmalt (Kabyle: ⵜⴰⵣⵎⴰⵍⵜ; Arabic: تازمالت) is a town in northern Algeria. It's about 85 km south west of Bejaia, 50 km at east of Bouira, 55 km south east of Tizi Ouzou, and 165 km south east of the capital Algiers. Tazmalt has a population of 25,000. The Béni Mansour–Bejaïa railway serves this community with SNTF train service.
