= Ait Waghlis =

Kabyle tribe

Ait Waghlis At Weɣlis
- Kabyle tribe
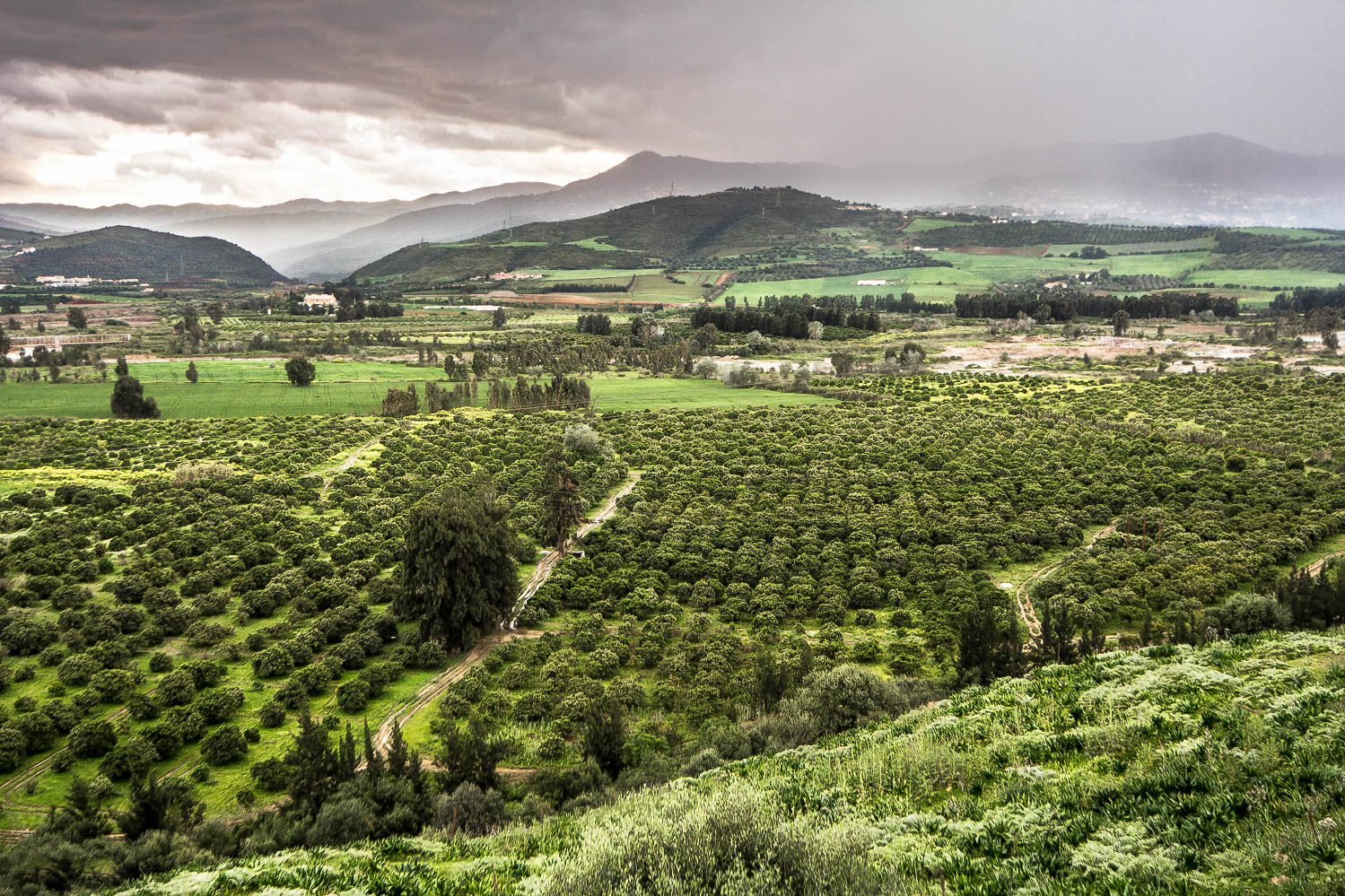
- Landscape in the surroundings of Sidi-Aich.
- Ethnicity: Kabyles
- Location: Soummam valley, Kabylia
- Parent tribe: Tindenses?
- Branches: Imzalen; Assameur
- Language: Kabyle language (taweɣlist var.)
- Religion: Islam

Ait Waghlis (Kabyle: At Weɣlis) is a non-confederated Kabyle tribe based in the Soummam valley, on the west side of the Soummam river and the east side of mount Akfadou, in Algeria. It is the biggest tribe of the Soummam valley in term of population.

== Etymology ==
The name 'Waghlis' (Kabyle: Weɣlis) comes from the Kabyle name for the panthera, which is the Berber root γls. Three hypothesis exist for the origin of the name:

According to one of the hypothesis, the name comes from the spots of the panthera, which were found on the clothing worn by the tribe members. According to another, it comes from the bravery of the same animal, which is said to be an attribute of the tribe members. A third hypothesis makes it derivate from the name of an eponymous founder named Aghiles.

Later, the name of the tribe gave patronyms such as Al-Waghlisi, notably worn by Abd al-Rahman al-Waghlisi and Oughlis, worn by Yasmine Oughlis.

During the French colonisation, various spellings were used to write the name of the tribe, most of them using an arabization form of the prefix Ait rendered as Beni. These variants include "Beni-Ourlis", "Beni-Oughlis", "Beni Oughlice", "Beni Ouarghlis", "Beni Ouglis", "Beni Ouaglis", "Beni Oualis", "Beni Oughlice" and "Aith Ourlis".

== Origin ==
During Antiquity, the territory of the tribe was inhabited by the Tindenses, a Libyan people. However, it is unknown whether the tribe descend from them.

Two origin legends also exist regarding the tribe. However, these accounts lack a historical basis and are not supported by historical sources.

According to the French colonial administration, the tribe was formed when a marabout, El Hadj Hassem, migrated from present-day Morocco to the region in the 12th century, after the Arab migration. His descendants later divided into three groups: the first one settled in the Sebaou river basin, the second integrated among the Ait Raten and the third was a family known as the "Zerarka", which became the Ait Waghlis

A local legend claims that the Ait Waghlis descend from a Greek sailor named Ulysses or Achilles, who is said to have settled in the region and given his name to the tribe.

== History ==
During the 11th and 12th centuries, the Soummam valley was under the rule of the Hammadid dynasty, and a road, the abrid n'soltan, linking the former capital, Kalâa of Ait Hammad, to the new capital of the kingdom, Bejaïa, was built. The road crossed the tribe's territory along the Soummam river and corresponds today to the N26 road.

The Ait Waghlis were known to be a tribe of Islamic science because of the amount of scholars who originate from the region. The tribe historically had four zawiyas , founded in the 14th and 15th centuries and located in Izzeruken, Sidi Hadj Hassiene, Sidi Moussa (Tinebdar) and Sidi Yahya, around sixty mosques and heighteen quranic schools.

From the 16th to the 19th century, the tribe was intermittently part of the kingdoms of Koukou and Ait Abbas. and was never submitted by the Turks.

In the 16th or 17th century, a conflict broke out between the Ait Waghlis and Ait Djennad tribes after merchants from the tribe were robbed by them. To calm the conflict, Youcef Ou Kaci, a poet from the Ait Djennad, wrote a poem about the Ait Waghlis, with the following verses:

Kabyle

Asmi terbeḥ ddunit
ar wanida k-ihwa ddu
Di Letnayen n At Jennad
dinna ay-d ibda laadu
Aweɣlis si zik d aḥṛuṛ
mačči d yiwen ad as yeḥku

Belleh ar-k azenɣ a ttiṛ
abrid ik Akeffadu
Aameṛ Waali deg-Gwewrir
d Ateṛkwi di Baṛeddu
Ulamma nexdem tuḥsift
abrid-a ilezm aɣ laafu.

Translation:
English

In the happy old days
One could go wherever one pleased
But at the market of the Ait Djennad,
The troubles began
The Ait Waghlis always have been noble men
To whom shall I say it, who does not already know

By God, let a bird be my messenger
Fly toward the Akfadou
Then to Aourir, to the home of Amar Ouali
A Turk of the Bardo Palace
Though we may have committed a fault
This time, let us be forgiven.

These verses were recited by Youcef Ou Kaci in the village square and, when the man who hosted him for the night revealed his identity, tension rose but the host protected him under his burnous.

In 1846, the tribe had 2,500 infantrymen, a considerable number compared to their neighbors, the Ouzellaguen and Illoulen Oussammeur who had 150 and 800 respectively. It also possessed 785 riffles, 435 of which belonged to the Imzalen fraction and 350 to the Assameur fraction.

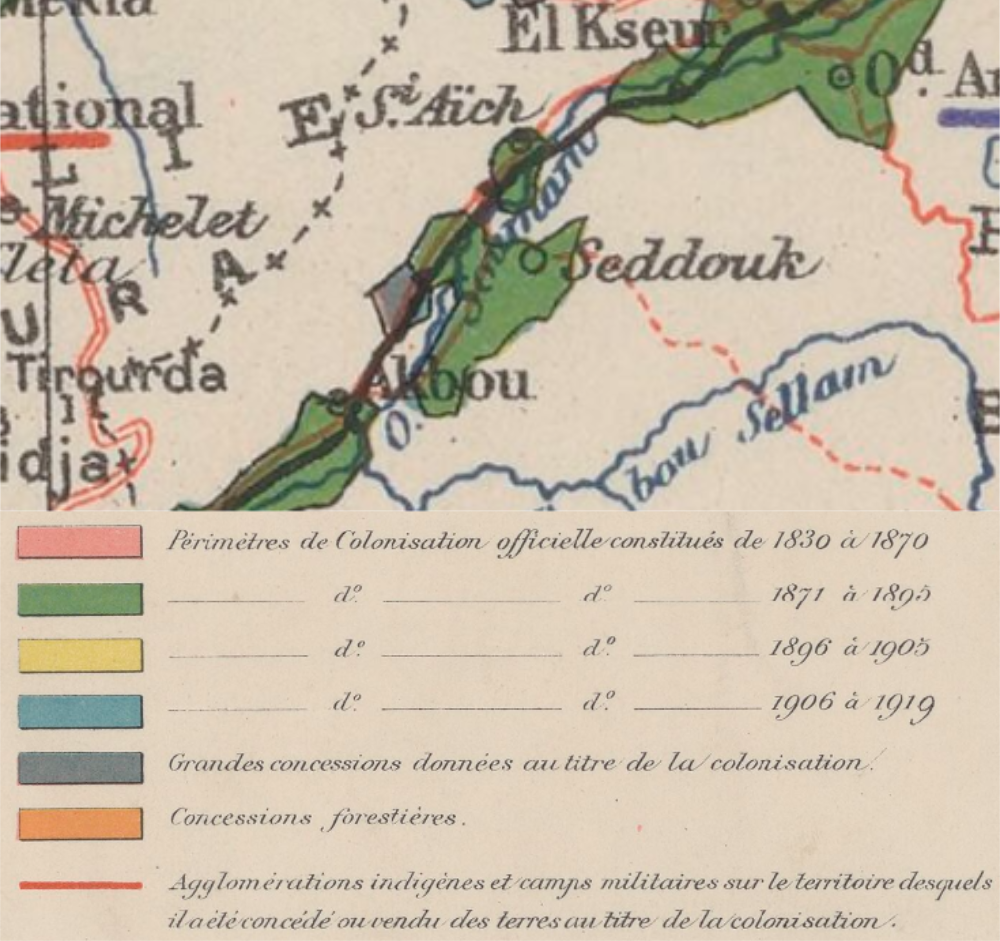
Colonization of the tribe.

The tribe submitted to the colonial troops of general Jean Thibaudin on July 2, 1871, after having resisted the troops of Maréchal Bugeaud in 1841 and took part in the Boubaghla Revolt in 1952 and the Mokrani Revolt in 1871.

The mixed town (commune mixte) of Sidi-Aich is founded on April 13, 1872 and established on August 25, 1880 by the governor-general.

In 1907, the tribe was one of the most educated of Algeria with 9 schools and 22 classrooms for 17,000 inhabitants.

In 1909 or 1910, the Jeunes Oughlissiens (Young Oughlissians) association was founded and proposed the installation of street lamps in villages.

On May 12, 2012, a museum of the Ait Waghlis in inaugurated by the GEHIMAB association.

== Geography ==
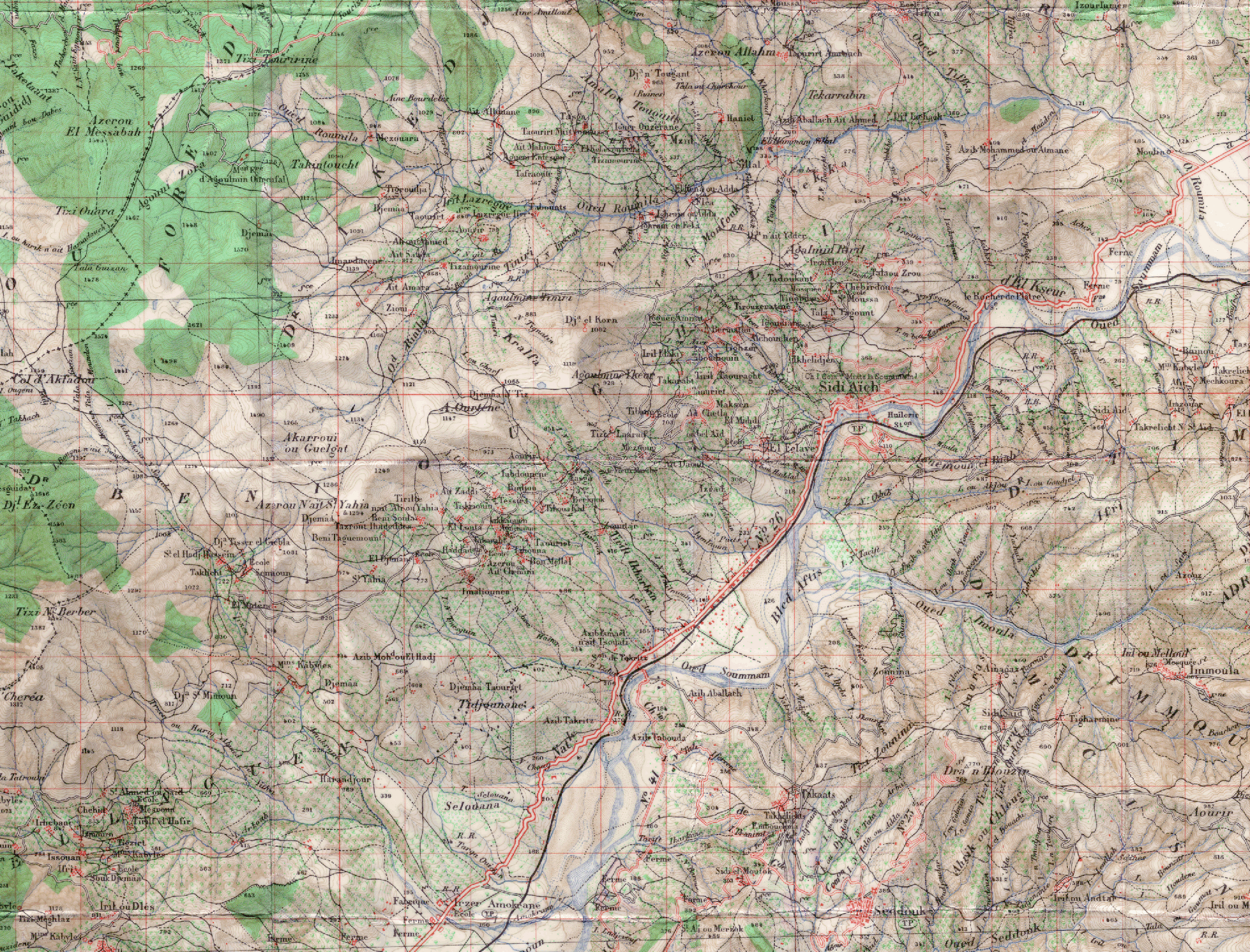
Map of the region of Sidi Aïch.

Communes making up the tribe.

The tribe is established in the Soummam valley, on the souther slope of Mount Akfadou, part of the Djurdjura range. Its territory forms a triangle bounded to the north by the Remila river, which marks the border with the Ait Mansour and Tifra tribes; to the east by the Soummam river and the Babors (bordering the Fenaia, Ait Immel, Ait Sidi Ayad and Imsisen tribes); and to the west by the Akfadou pass (border with the Ouzellaguen and Ait Idjer tribes). It also shares a border with the Ait Aidel tribe.

=== Socio-political organization ===
It is divided into two fractions : the Imzalen in the north (communes of Sidi-Aich, Tibane, Leflaye and Tinabdher) and the Assameur in the south (communes of Chemini and Souk Oufella)

- The Assameur (Usamar):
  - Communes of Chemini, Semaoune and Souk Oufella
  - Villages of Agueni, Ait Chemini, Ait Ouragh, Ait Soula, Ait Zadi, Aourir, Ayaten, Bajou, Berkouk, Bouchachiou, Boumellal, Djenane, Iabdounene, Ihaddaden, Ilmaten, Imaliouen, Laazib Aballache, Laazib Ait Touati, Laazib Mellah, Larbaa, Louta, Sidi Hadj Hassiene, Sidi Yahia, Taghrast, Takrietz, Taourirt, Tasga, Tazroutz, Tidjounane, Tighilt, Tihouna, Tiliouacadi, Takhlijt, Tissira and Zountar
- The Imzalen:
  - Communes of Leflaye, Sidi-Aich, Tibane and Tinabdher
  - Villages of Aichouchene, Ait Chetla, Ait Daoud, Ait Oubelaid, Akasise, Birmatou, Chebirdou, El Madi, Ighil Idek, Ighzer n'Chebib, Igoudien, Iguer Amar, Irouflene, Izghad, Lazib n'Ait Atmane, Lazib n'Ait Touati, Maakal, Maksene, Mezgoug, Remila, Tadoukant, Takerabt, Takorabt, Tala Ouzrou, Tala Tagout, Taourirt, Tizi Laraif, Tighilt Taouraght, Tighouzratine, Tighzert and Tigzirt

=== Toponymy ===
The toponyms of the tribe's villages are in majority of Kabyle origin and refer to natural entities such as hills (iɣil (m.) , tiɣilt (f.)), mountain passes (tizi), water sources (tala) but also to animals and plants. Other ones refer to humans, using the particle Ait (At), which means "son/descendant of", followed by a name (e.g. Cetla, Dawed, Cemmini, Ubelɛid) but also to the habitat, designating key components of the Kabyle home (Tasga, Tadukant, Igudien), markets (Suq Ufella) and more.

== Population ==
During the 20th century, the territory of the Ait Waghlis eexperienced significant migration flows to the Mitidja region. Around 1930, it is estimated that 15,000 Ait Waghlis people migrated to the Mitidja during the harvest season which corresponds to 1 adult out of 3.

In the 1950s, migrants from the tribe made up 63% of the male working-age population or 2 out of 3 working-age adults (15.7% of the total population).

The Algerian War accelerated the rural exodus due to the destruction of villages. Until the 1960s, 10,000 to 12,000 people left the Ait Waghlis territory to settle in Algiers or Bejaïa, while other moved to Sidi-Aïch.

Population of the tribe from 1851 to 2017

| Year | Population | Year | Population | Year | Population |
|---|---|---|---|---|---|
| 1851 | 5,500 | 1909 | 18,000 | 1998 | 53,791 |
| 1870 | 9,433 | 1930 | 19,000 | 2008 | 55,413 |
| 1873 | 7,500 | 1950 | 26,271 | 2017 | 58,908 |
| 1879 | 9,104 | 1977 | 30,565 | | |
| 1907 | 17,000 | 1987 | 42,273 | | |

== Culture ==
=== Language ===
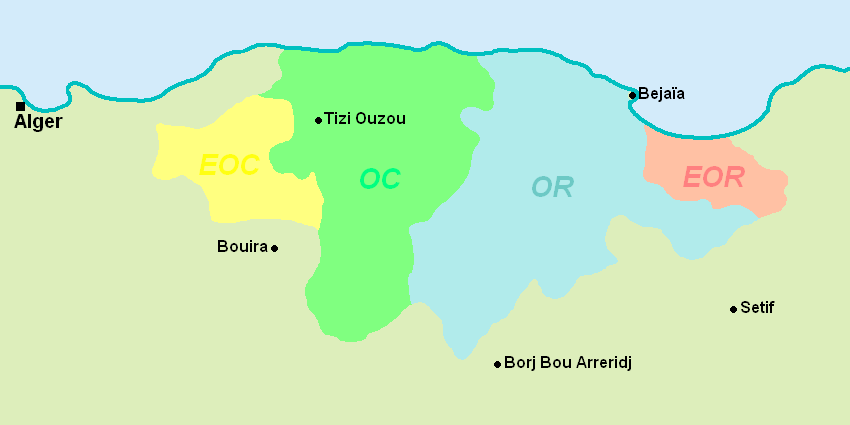
Dialects of the Kabyle language.

The Ait Waghlis speak a variety of the central-eastern dialect of the Kabyle language known as Taweɣlist. They are characterized by the use the Voiceless bilabial plosive [p].

This variety shows internal variation linked to the historical division of the tribe. The Assameur, closer to the Igawawen, have a variety characterized by the use of voiceless plosives (e.g. tappurt, heggi, axxam k yemɣaren, axxam-aki), whereas the Imzalen use forms closer to those typical of the Soummam valley (tawwurt, heyyi, axxam yemɣaren, axxam-ayi).

=== Customs and traditions ===
The Ait Waghlis were known in the region for their ability to heal bone fractures, a skill traditionally attributed to them by the local custom. Today, this practices continues within a family of the village of Ath Soula (axxam n’tbib). The tribe are also renowned masters in the craftwork of dwarf palm (Kabyle: ddum, igezdem).

They are also one of the five tribes in North Africa that make the mz'alla, a type of oversized straw hat worn during summer.

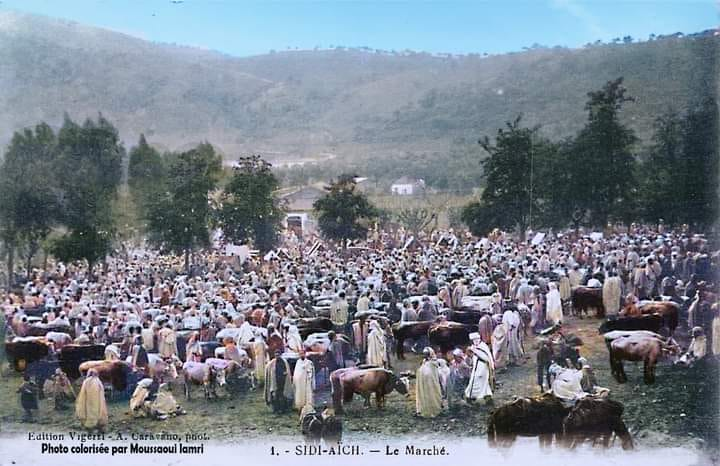
The market of Sidi Aich, 1933.

The town of Sidi-Aich had the most important market of Eastern Kabylia in the late 19th century. It was held on Wednesday and received over 5,000 people each week and supplied over 50,000 inhabitants of the neighboring regions. Many goods were imported and exported:

- Exported goods:
  - Baskets, mats, azembils (dwarf palm baskets), wool blankets, wooden spoons and dishes, kabyle knives and desks, carders, plowshares, plows, jugs and pots (fig. 3), fresh and dried goat skins, sheep skins, salt, olives, olive oil, fresh and dried figs, carobs, oranges, lemons, pomegranates, medlars, walnuts, green onions, broad beans, djelbouns, peas, chickpeas, green and red peppers, leather, raw wool, poultry, eggs, tallow, meat, honey, gallnuts, black soap, sheep, goats, oxen and cows.
- Imported goods:
  - Gandouras, burnous, chechias, shoes, cotton fabrics, silks, beads, coral, kabyle jewelry, dates, sugar, spices, alum, cristals, lamps, nails, padlocks, locks, tobacco, donkeys, mules and many others.

These include traditional local production and that introduced by French settlers.

The Ait Waghlis were rich in beehives and olive trees and harvested a lot of cereals, linen and fruits. They also made linen clothes, woolen fabrics, soap, chests (fig.4) and were one of the rare Kabyle tribes, alongside the Iflissen Umellil and Ait Fraoussen, to produce bladed weapons and firearms.

In 1859, the tribe had a total of 53 oil and flour mills and 2 metal workers.

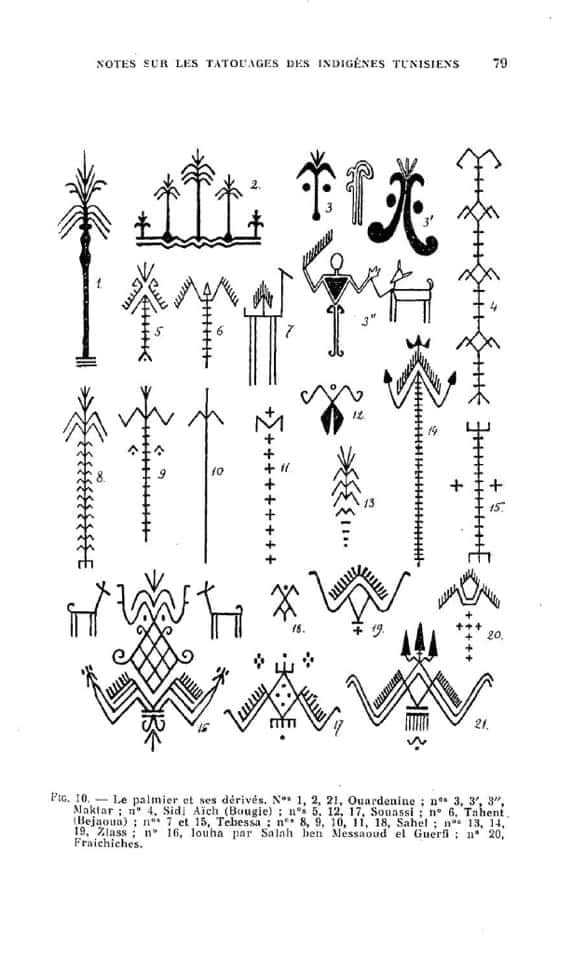
Fig. 1: 4. Neck tattoo from Sidi-Aich

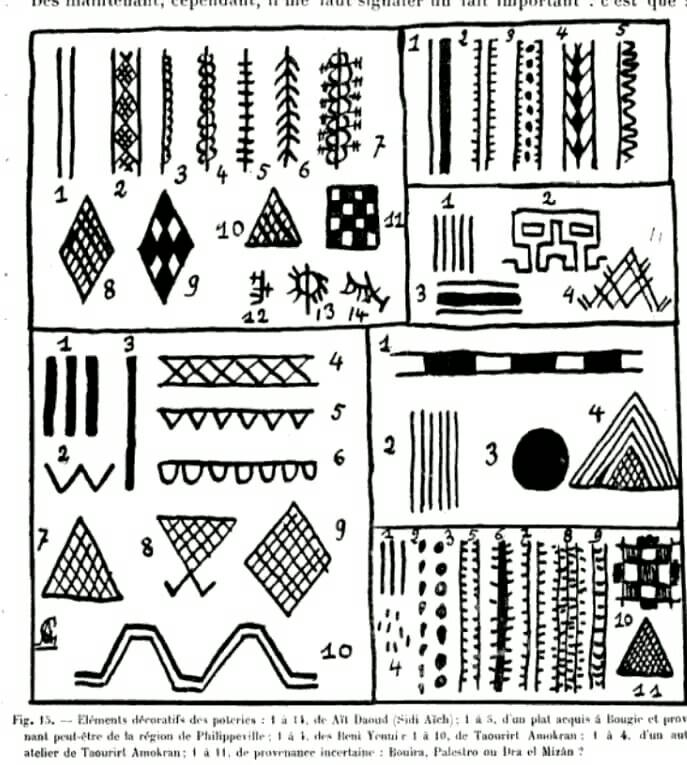
Fig. 2: 1 to 14. Potery patterns, Ait Daoud

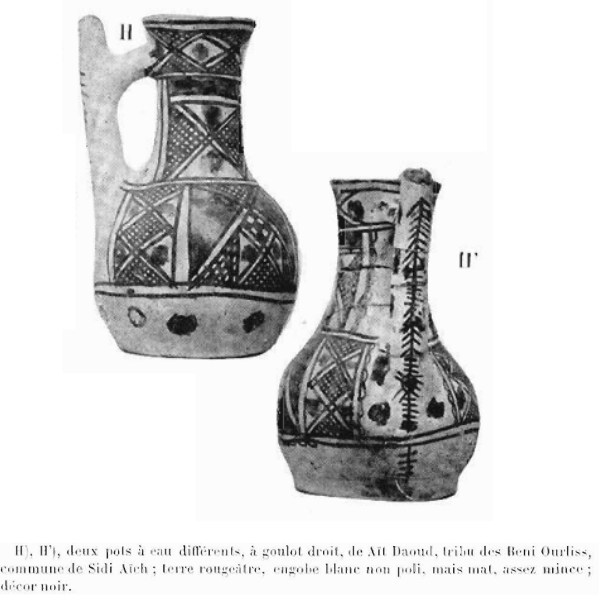
Fig. 3: Potery

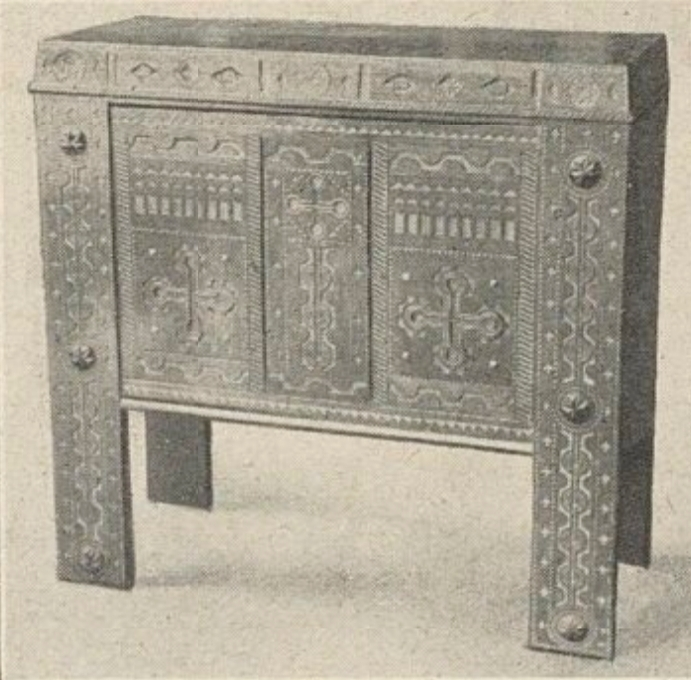
Fig. 4: Kabyle chest

== In literature ==
Among the poems written by Youcef Ou Kaci, "L'amour heureux" (Tayri) mentions the tribe:

Kabyle

A tiziri
Țnadiɣ-ț tețnad'iyi
A tiziri
Bɣiɣ-t ula d nekkini
A Sut Yaεla
Ziɣ lemḥibba terna kra
A Sut Weɣlis
Ma ɣliɣ
nedheɣ s yisem-is
Izime r aras
Γli-yas deg rebbi ḥku-yas
Tusbiɣt ṇ-ṭiṭ
Ayen illan deg-gul teẓṛiṭ-ṭ
Nnan taεyiḍ
Ger tebbucin telleɣwiḍ
A taḥmimuct
Ma ixaq fk-as taqemmuct
A mm imezran
Ṭṭes kan mazal itran

Translation:
English

Moonlight
I was looking for her, she was looking for me too
Moonlight
I want it too
Girl of the At Yaala
True, love has something to do with it
Girl of the At Waghlis
When I fall, it is her name I call
Brown lamb
Fall into her lap and tell her
Girl with painted eyes
You know what is in my heart
You were tired, I was told
You weakened against her breast
Fard-faced girl
If he is sad, give him your lips
Long-haired girl
Just sleep, there are still stars in the sky

== Notable members ==
- Amour Abdenour, singer, songwriter and composer
- Ali Brakchi, track and field athlete specialized in long jump
- Rachid Ferhani, singer
- Djaffar Gacem, film director, producer and screenwriter
- Salim Hanifi, professional footballer
- Tahir al-Jazairi, Muslim scholar and educational reformer.
- Mohand Amokrane Maouche, founder and first president of the Algerian Football Federation
- Ahmed Oudjani, professional football player
- Chérif Oudjani, professional football player
- Mohand Cherif Sahli, ambassador of Algeria to China, Czechoslovakia, North Korea and Vietnam, historian and writer
- Mohamed Saïl, Algerian anarchist and anti-colonial activist born in Taourirt.
- Rachid Taha, singer and activist (through father)
- Hamid Tibouchi, painter and poet
- Abd al-Rahman al-Waghlisi, Muslim scholar, author, mufti and imam.

== See also ==
- Kabyles

== Sources ==
- Boulouque, Sylvain (1994). "Saïl Mohamed: Ou la vie et la Révolte d'un anarchiste Algérien". Appels aux travailleurs algériens. Volonté Anarchiste (in French). Vol. 43. Groupe Fresnes-Antony. pp. 1–4. OCLC 466607851.
- Boulouque, Sylvain (2 March 2021). "Mohamed Saïl (1894-1953)". Partage Noir (in French).
