= Sidi Aïch District =

Coordinates: 36.612944°N 4.688298°E

Sidi Aïch District Tadayra n Sidi Ɛic
- District
- Country: Algeria
- Province: Béjaïa Province

Area
  - Total: 3,154 sq mi (8,169 km^{2})
- Time zone: UTC+1 (CET)

Sidi Aïch District (Kabyle: Tadayra n Sidi Ɛic) is a district of Béjaïa Province, Algeria.

== Municipalities ==
The district is further divided into 5 municipalities:

- Sidi Aïch
- El-Flaye
- Tinabdher
- Tifra
- Sidi-Ayad
