= Pont de Tasfart =

Pont de Tasfart جسر تاسفارت
- Coordinates: 36°26′22″N 4°33′07″E
- Crosses: Oued Soummam
- Locale: west side: Akbou Commune, east side: Bouhamza Commune
- Preceded by: unnamed bridge

Characteristics
- Total length: 287m
- Width: 7.70m

History
- Constructed by: Gesi-TP, SAPTA
- Construction start: 2015
- Construction end: 2024
- Opened: 6th November 2024

Location
- Interactive map of Pont de Tasfart

Pont de Tasfart Arabic: جسر تاسفارت is a bridge in Tasfart, Bouhamza Commune/Akbou Commune, Seddouk District/Akbou District, Béjaïa Province, Algeria.

Construction started in 2015 and finished in November 2024. The bridge links the Soummam Valley villages to the RN26 near Akbou, saving a 17km detour. When construction started there was a contractual deadline of 18 months, however the project ended up being over 8 years behind schedule due to the failure of the company, Gesi-TP. The builder was Gesi-TP and SAPTA. The bridge opened on Wednesday, 6th November 2024 by the Wali of Béjaïa, Mr. Kamel-Eddine Karbouche.
