= Tansaout =

Tansaout تانساوت
- Village
- Village in Algeria
- Coordinates: 36°26′1″N 4°43′13″E
- Country: Algeria
- Province: Béjaïa Province
- District: Seddouk District
- Commune: Bouhamza

Area
  - Total: 0.54 km^{2} (0.21 sq mi)
- Elevation: 417 m (1,368 ft)

Population (2009)
  - Total: 700
- Time zone: UTC+1 (CET)
- Postal code: 06034

Tansaout Arabic: تانساوت is a village in Bouhamza Commune, Seddouk District, Béjaïa Province, Algeria. It is located South of Tachouaft and Bouhamza.

The village is home to the River Olive Oil factory, the Stade de Tansaout, Cimetière de Tansaout and the Pont de Tansaout.

== Name ==
The villages name is Kabyle and derived from the verb "yinsa". Tansaout translates as "the passage". This is likely due to its location between Béjaïa, Sétif and Bordj Bou Arréridj.

== Location ==
The village is on the hillside, with the village going down to the sides of the Tichy-Haf Reservoir. At the bottom of the valley there is market gardening, with fig and olive trees.

== Economy ==
The village is known for its weekly market, Souk El Khemis, held on Thursdays. There was a Mountain Farmers' Festival in the village on 29 August 2015. The festival was organised by the Assirem Gouraya association of Béjaïa to give a voice to farmers. Tansaout has considerable potential for agriculture, in particular, sheep breeding. The village is known for its chillis, peppers, and tomatoes, which are sold in markets in Seddouk and Beni Maouche.

== Incidents ==
In Late November 1957, the village was evacuated after an ambush at Ighzar n Tissemt in early November. Fighter jets shot at civilians in the village.

There was an earthquake in November 2000 that destroyed many houses in the village. Public authorities granted aid to the displaced families. In December 2007, the lower part of the village flooded with water of the Tichy-Haf Reservoir.
