= Tachouaft =

Tachouaft تاشوافث
- Village
- Village in Algeria
- Coordinates: 36°28′2″N 4°43′10″E
- Country: Algeria
- Province: Béjaïa Province
- District: Seddouk District
- Commune: Bouhamza

Area
  - Total: 0.46 km^{2} (0.18 sq mi)
- Elevation: 632 m (2,073 ft)
- Time zone: UTC+1 (CET)
- Postal code: 06034

Tachouaft Arabic: تاشوافث is a village in Bouhamza Commune, Seddouk District, Béjaïa Province, Algeria. It is located North of Tansaout and South of Tizert and Taourirt.

The villages name is Kabyle and translates as "the shaded place".

The village has a mosque, a football pitch and a cemetery.

In late November 1957, the village was evacuated after an ambush at Ighzar n Tissemt in early November. Fighter jets shot at civilians in Tachouaft.

During the Algerian War the village was bombed on 16 December 1958 by B-26 aircraft, practically destroying every building.

A shell from the war was recently discovered during road clearing in a forest near the village.

== Victims of the 1958 bombing ==
Arezki or Si Ahmed family (Balit): Balit Arezki, 46; Benmeziane Adidi, his wife, 32; and children, Boualem, 7 and Tayakout, 11; one survivor, Ahmed. Imekhloufene Tallit, 33, daughter of Mohand Tahar el Betsadoune El Ghaia, wife of Benatsou Mohand Oulhadi, and her daughter Aicha, 12, Balit Zahra, 5; Benmeziane Abdeslam and his wife Beomeziane Sakina, Adjenad Arezki (Mokrane), 12; Tassift H'mimi (Ahmed), 56; Benatsou Mohand Tayeb (Mohand Tahar) Benmeziane Chehla, 27; Benmeziane Hadjila, 7; Benmeziane Bouzid, 5; Ladiadna Saad, 72; Chenna Betitra, 3, daughter of Lahlou.
