= Birmatou =

Birmatou Bermatu
- Village
- Interactive map of Birmatou
- Coordinates: 36.623120°N 4.667788°E
- Country: Algeria
- Region: Kabylia
- Province: Béjaïa
- District: Sidi Aïch
- Communes: Tinabdher
- Elevation: 450 m (1,480 ft)
- Postal code: 06037

Birmatou (Kabyle: Bermatu) is a village of the commune of Tinabdher, in Kabylia.

== Etymology ==
The name comes from the Berber root mt (matu) which means "to die". According to the legend, the name was given to the village after clan wars after which dead members of the village were thrown inside of a well. Another source confirms the origin of the name. According to this source, the name means "they all are dead", in reference to a battle.

In different sources, various spellings were used to write the name of the village. These include "Bermatou" and "Berremâtou".

== History ==
Historically, the village was a part of the Ait Waghlis tribe.
