= Taxliǧt Icaɛbanen =

Taxliǧt Icaɛbanen تاخليجت إيععبانن
- Village
- Village in Algeria
- Coordinates: 36°25′7″N 4°35′25″E
- Country: Algeria
- Province: Bejaia Province
- District: Seddouk District
- Commune: Bouhamza

Area
  - Total: 0.06 km^{2} (0.023 sq mi)
- Elevation: 332 m (1,089 ft)
- Time zone: UTC+1 (CET)
- Postal code: 06031

Taxliǧt Icaɛbanen Arabic: تاخليجت إيععبانن is a village in Bouhamza Commune, Seddouk District, Northern Algeria in the Béjaïa Province. The village is located East of Tizi Wezrou and Sidi Yahia, and West of At Brahem.

The name is Kabyle and translates as "The Icaɛbanen clan's hill".

== Notable buildings ==
There is a mosque on the outskirts of the village.
