= Takhlidjt Ichachoaen =

Takhlidjt Ichachoaen ثاخليجت ايشاشوان Icacuɛen Chaoucha Cawca
- Village
- Village in Algeria
- Coordinates: 36°26′56″N 4°35′25″E
- Country: Algeria
- Province: Béjaïa Province
- District: Seddouk District
- Commune: Bouhamza

Area
  - Total: 0.06 km^{2} (0.023 sq mi)
- Elevation: 570 m (1,870 ft)
- Time zone: UTC+1 (CET)
- Postal code: 06031

Takhlidjt Ichachoaen Arabic: ثاخليجت ايشاشوان Kabyle: Icacuɛen (Chaoucha Kabyle: Cawca Arabic: شاوْشَة) is a small village in Bouhamza Commune, Seddouk District, Béjaïa Province, Algeria. It is located Southwest of Bouhitem, Northwest of Toudert and Northwest of Tasfart.

There is a cemetery in the village called Cimetière Sidi El Wadhah. There is a football stadium in the village called Stade de Bouhitem.

The villages official name is Kabyle and translates as "the bushy thicket", while the short name (Chaoucha) is a shortened form of 'Ichachoaen'.
