= Tighilt =

Tighilt تيغيلت
- Village
- Village in Algeria
- Coordinates: 36°26′34″N 4°38′54″E
- Province: Bejaia Province
- District: Seddouk District
- Commune: Bouhamza

Area
  - Total: 0.08 km^{2} (0.031 sq mi)
- Time zone: UTC+1 (CET)
- Postal code: 06031

Tighilt Arabic: تيغيلت is a small village within Mahfouda village, Bouhamza, Béjaïa, Algeria. It is located just South of Tighilt n'Trahi.

The village's name is Kabyle and translates as 'The small hill'

In Tighilt there is a mosque - Tighit Mosque (مسجد تيغيت), and on the W35 at 36.4425892, 4.6495279 is the village shop, Chez Si Lahlou Oumerzoug (Tahanut n Si Lahlou), which opened in 1984 and sold vegetables, kitchen items and dairy products. The shop was a community hub and during the 1980s, the villagers met at the shop to play board games such as Taxxatemt and Acarreg n Lehlawat. The shop later sold phone accessories.

In Tighilt is the Cimetière n les Bezzou, which is opposite a mosque and the Cimetière n Tighilt.
