= Abd al-Rahman al-Waghlisi =

Famous Islamic jurist, mufti and author

Abderrahmane El Waghlissi
- Ɛebderreḥman Lweɣlisi

Personal life
- Born: c. 1303 in Tinabdher
- Died: 1384 CE (785/6 AH) Béjaïa
- Main interest(s): Hadith, Fiqh
- Notable idea: Maliki madhhab
- Notable work: al-Waghlisiyya

Religious life
- Religion: Islam
- Jurisprudence: Maliki

ʿAbd al-Raḥmān al-Waghlīsī (Kabyle: Ɛebderreḥman Lweɣlisi, Arabic: عبد الرحمن الوغليسي) (died 1384), also spelled Abderrahmane El Waghlissi or Abd-ar-Rahman El Oughlissi, was an Algerian Muslim scholar, author, mufti and imam.

== Biography ==
Sources on the life of al-Waghlīsī remain scarce. We do not know his exact date of birth, but we do know he was born in the village of Tala-Tagouth, near Tinabdher, into the tribe of Ait Waghlis, in the current daïra of Sidi Aïch. He is best known for writing a treatise on jurisprudence: al-Muqaddima al-Fiqhiyya, famous throughout the Maghreb, Andalusia and Egypt under the name al-Waghlisiyya. This text remained among the region's premier books of teaching Maliki fiqh and Sufism for centuries and has been commented on by many famous scholars (Abdelkrim az-Zwawi, Ahmad Zarruq al-Barnusi, Abu Abdellah as-Senussi).

He is buried in the village of Tala n'Tagouth, in the present wilaya of Béjaïa, where a mausoleum was erected to him as well as a small mosque that bears his name. A symposium was dedicated to him in Béjaïa in October 2004.
