= Tagma, Béjaïa =

Tagma تاقمة
- Village
- Village in Algeria
- Coordinates: 36°25′2″N 4°36′37″E
- Country: Algeria
- Province: Bejaia Province
- District: Seddouk District
- Commune: Bouhamza

Area
  - Total: 0.17 km^{2} (0.066 sq mi)
- Elevation: 240 m (790 ft)
- Time zone: UTC+1 (CET)
- Postal code: 06031

Tagma Arabic: تاقمة is a village in Bouhamza Commune, Seddouk District, Northern Algeria in the Béjaïa Province. The village is located East of At Brahem and West of Mahfouda.

The villages name comes from ancient Kabyle and loosely translates to "alliance". The meaning of the village means something like "The allied settlement".
