= Mohand Cherif Sahli =

Ambassador of Algeria, historian and writer

- Muḥend Cṛif Sahli

Algerian Ambassador to Czechoslovakia
- In office March 13, 1972 – June 30, 1978
- President: Revolutionary Council; Houari Boumédiène
- Preceded by: Office established
- Succeeded by: Noureddine Delleci

Algerian Ambassador to North Korea
- In office 1971–1978
- President: Revolutionary Council; Houari Boumédiène

Algerian Ambassador to Vietnam
- In office 1967–1971
- President: Revolutionary Council
- Preceded by: Office established
- Succeeded by: Abderrazak Bouhara

Algerian Ambassador to China
- In office February 3, 1966 – July 4, 1971
- President: Revolutionary Council
- Preceded by: M'hamed Yala
- Succeeded by: Taleb Bendiab Chaïb

Algerian Ambassador to Scandinavia
- In office 1957–1962
- President: Ferhat Abbas

Personal details
- Born: October 6, 1906 (age 120) Tasga, Souk-Oufella
- Died: July 4, 1989 (aged 82) Algiers
- Resting place: Martyrs' Plot, El Alia Cemetery
- Citizenship: French (until 1962); Algerian (from 1962)
- Party: ENA; PPA; FLN
- Education: Paris-Sorbonne University
- Profession: Ambassador, historian, writer

Mohand Cherif Sahli (Kabyle: Muḥend Cṛif Sahli; October 6, 1906 – July 4, 1989) was an historian, militant for the Algerian cause and Algerian ambassador to Scandinavia, China, Vietnam, North Korea and Czechoslovakia.

== Biography ==
Mohand Cherif Sahli was born in the village of Tasga, in the commune of Souk-Oufella, Kabylia, and belonged to the Ait Waghlis tribe.

He began his education at the school of Sidi-Aich before continuing his studies at Lycée Bugeaud in Algiers. After completing secondary education, Mohand Cherif Sahli enrolled at the Paris-Sorbonne University where he obtained a licence and an agrégation in philosophy and then wrote a booklet, Théorie de la raison et de l'expérience dans la philosophie d'Emile Boutroux.

Following his studies, he worked as teacher in Paris from 1930 to 1939. He was dismissed in September 1939 due to his nationalist writings and devoted himself to the Algerian nationalist cause. The same year, he began working a journalist, contributing to El Ouma, El Ifriqia, El Hayat and Résistance algérienne. He also became a sympathizer of the Étoile Nord-Africaine and became a member of its steering committee then one of the Algerian People's Party section leaders in France starting in 1937.

In 1935, he is elected as the president of the AEMAF (Association des étudiants musulmans algériens en France) until 1936.

In April 1939, he founded Ifrikia, first Algerian nationalist journal in French.

During the summer of 1940, he became a teacher at the Toudja school and later returned to higher education following a lawsuit against the French state. There, he met Zahir Ihaddadden. Five years later, in 1945, he met Mostefa Lacheraf of which he became a friend.

In 1949, he published his first book, Le message de Yougourtha, as well as L'Algérie accuse le calvaire du peuple algérien, a book seized by the colonial authorities. Six years later, in 1955, he joined the FLN's Federal Press and Propaganda Comitee in France and wrote in La résistance, El Moudjahid and L'Algérie d'abord. From 1957 to 1962, he served as a permanent representative of the FLN and later as ambassador of the Provisional Government of the Algerian Republic (GPRA) to Scandinavian countries.

In June 1960, his involvement with the "Movements for Colonial Freedom" contributed to the recognition by the United Nations General Assembly that the Algerian War could only be ended through the Algerian people's right to self-determination.

After the independence of Algeria, he was nominated as the Director of Research and Documentation within the Ministry of Foreign Affairs with the rank of "minister plenipotentiary".

In 1962, he became director of the National Archives of Algeria before being appointed ambassador to China (1966–1971), Vietnam (1967–1971), North Korea (1971–1978) with a seat in Beijing where he met Mao Zedong, Zhou Enlai, Norodom Sihanouk and Ho Chi Minh. In 1971, he was named ambassador to Czechoslovakia (1972–1978).

In 1967, Kateb Yacine dedicated the poem "je ne voit plus le jour" to him.

On the 1st of November 1974, he gave a reception to celebrate the 12th anniversary of the Algerian revolution, attended by Vice Premier Chen Yi, during which he delivered a speech.

He never married and lived with the son of one of his cousins from his retirement in 1978, to his death on July 4, 1989. He was buried in the Martyrs' Plot, El Alia Cemetery.

== Tribute ==
In 2014, a symposium is organized by the association GEHIMAB for the 25th anniversary of his death.

== Works ==
- Abdelkader, chevalier de la foi. Éditeur Amicale des Algériens en Europe (A.A.E). 1953.
- Décoloniser l'histoire : introduction à l'histoire de Maghreb. François Maspero. 1965.
- L'Algérie accuse, le calvaire du peuple algérien. En-Nahdha. 1949. Algiers.
- Le complot contre les peuples africains. En-Nahdha. 1950. Algiers.
- L'Emir Abdelkader : Mythes français et réalités algériennes. ENAP. 1988. Algiers.
- Le message de Yougourtha. Éditions Paris : "l'Algérien en Europe". 1947.
