= Tizi Wezrou =

Tizi Wezrou تيزي وزرو
- Village
- Village in Algeria
- Coordinates: 36°25′17″N 4°34′36″E
- Country: Algeria
- Province: Béjaïa Province
- District: Seddouk District
- Commune: Bouhamza

Area
  - Total: 0.04 km^{2} (0.015 sq mi)
- Time zone: UTC+1 (CET)
- Postal code: 06031

Tizi Wezrou (Arabic: تيزي وزرو, Kabyle: Tizi Wezru) is a village in Bouhamza Commune, Béjaïa Province, Algeria. The village is located northwest of At Brahem and Sidi Yahia, and south of Tasfart, Taouint u Meḥaoud and Boumessaoud.

The village is home to the Ibaliden Olive Oil Factory and a cemetery.

== Etymology ==
The village's name is Kabyle and translates to 'Rocky Pass'.
