= Pont de Tansaout =

Pont de Tansaout جسر تانسـاوت Tiγremt n Tansaout
- Coordinates: 36°25′41″N 4°43′41″E
- Crosses: Oued Bousselam
- Locale: west side: Bouhamza Commune, east side: El Maïn Commune, Beni Ourtilane Commmune

Characteristics
- Total length: 317.80
- Width: 11.40

History
- Construction start: 2005
- Construction end: 2015
- Opened: 2015

Location
- Interactive map of Pont de Tansaout

The Pont de Tansaout (Arabic: جسر تانسـاوت, Kabyle: Tiγremt n Tansaout) is a bridge over the Oued Bousselam in Tansaout village, Bouhamza, El Maïn and Beni Ourtilane Commmunes, Algeria.

Construction started c. 2005, but no significant progress occurred until c. 2013, when until that point only 20% was built. The bridge was completed in 2015. Before the bridge, there was a ford there, which was vey busy on Thursdays when the weekly market was on in Tansaout. The road between the wadi and the village was renovated in 2014 as part of CW35 modernisation, which involved widening and paving the road. The previous road had not been paved for a long time, and was saturated with crevasses.
