= Tasfart =

Tasfart تاسفارت
- Village
- Village in Algeria
- Coordinates: 36°26′18″N 4°33′24″E
- Country: Algeria
- Province: Béjaïa Province
- District: Seddouk District
- Commune: Bouhamza

Area
  - Total: 0.35 km^{2} (0.14 sq mi)
- Elevation: 201 m (659 ft)
- Time zone: UTC+1 (CET)
- Postal code: 06031

Tasfart Arabic: تاسفارت is a village in Bouhamza Commune, Seddouk District, Béjaïa Province, Algeria. It is located Northwest of Boumessaoud and Southwest of Takhlidjt Ichachoaen and Bouhitem.

The village is home to the Gueldaman caves. There is also a cemetery and a quarry, and the Pont de Tasfert.

The village's name is Kabyle and translates as "the small clearing"
