= Tizert =

Tizert تيزرت Tizekht
- Village
- Village in Algeria
- Coordinates: 36°29′28″N 4°44′8″E
- Country: Algeria
- Province: Béjaïa Province
- District: Béni Maouche District
- Commune: Beni Maouche

Area
  - Total: 0.21 km^{2} (0.081 sq mi)
- Elevation: 850 m (2,790 ft)
- Time zone: UTC+1 (CET)
- Postal code: 06031

Tizert Arabic: تيزرت or Tizekht is a village in Beni Maouche Commune, Béni Maouche District, Northern Algeria in the Béjaïa Province.

The village is located North of Tachouaft and Taourirt, and Southeast of Beni Dja'ad.

The etymology of the villages name is "the place of the olive tree"

There is a marble war memorial in the village to the shuhadā (martyrs) who died in the Algerian War. There is also a mosque.

Some local villagers have vandalised and desecrated graves in the cemetery.

== History ==
The village dates back to the Byzantine period. The village Tizekht Mosque dates back to the 9th Century.

During the Ottoman period the village was burned seven times because the residents didn't pay taxes.

The village was bombed three times by the French Army in the Algerian War.

There were three battles in the village, including the Battle of Ifri on April 24, 1957, the Battle of Achtoug in May 1957, and the Battle of Bouzdhguene. The village, along with Aguemoune also sheltered refugees.
