= Taouint u Meḥaoud =

Taouint u Meḥaoud تاوينت و محاود Taâwint Oumhaoued
- Hamlet
- Village in Algeria
- Coordinates: 36°25′54″N 4°34′52″E
- Country: Algeria
- Province: Béjaïa Province
- District: Seddouk District
- Commune: Bouhamza

Area
  - Total: 0.03 km^{2} (0.012 sq mi)
- Elevation: 492 m (1,614 ft)
- Time zone: UTC+1 (CET)
- Postal code: 06031

Taouint u Meḥaoud is a hamlet in Bouhamza Commune, Seddouk District, Béjaïa Province, Algeria. It is located North of Tizi Wezrou and Southwest of Tala Abdellah.

The hamlets name is Kabyle and translates as 'the enclosure of Meḥaoud'.
