= Sidi Yahia, Béjaïa =

Sidi Yahia سيدي يحيى
- Village
- Village and resort in Algeria
- Coordinates: 36°24′39″N 4°35′16″E
- Country: Algeria
- Province: Bejaia Province
- District: Seddouk District
- Commune: Bouhamza

Area
  - Total: 0.02 km^{2} (0.0077 sq mi)
- Time zone: UTC+1 (CET)
- Postal code: 06031

Sidi Yahia Arabic: سيدي يحيى Kabyle: Sidi Yahya is a spa resort and village in Bouhamza Commune, Béjaïa, Algeria. It is located on the banks of the Bousselam River, Southeast of Tizi Wezrou, West of At Brahem and Southwest of Taxliǧt Icaɛbanen. The resort was founded in the 15th Century by Sufi scholar, Sidi Yahia El Aidli, who the villages name comes from.

The village has a thermal spa and is a popular destination for tourists from Sétif, Algiers, Béjaïa, Bordj Bou Arréridj and Tizi Ouzou. The village is in a rocky valley and only has a few olive trees growing there, with the houses built of local stone, clay, and red tiles. Most buildings and facilities date back to the 1900s. The Hammam is located in a building on the Southern end of the village. Inside is boiling water storage and tiled benches.

Above the cliffs in the valley, on a rock, according to legend, is a hoofprint of Sidi Yahia's horse. There is a cave above the spring, this is where women offer prayers and alms. This cave is where Sidi Yahia El Aidli lived in the 15th Century. He was said to have washed himself in the springs, and they bubbled when Yahia touched the icy water, this is now where the hot springs now are. Many women come to the hot springs in the resort for Pilgrimage, where they make offerings and pray. The water temperature is around 40 degrees, and a flow rate of 2L/S

There is a café nearby the hot springs, called Récèption, where they sell cold drinks, coffee, lemonade, biscuits and hot tea. There are also rooms available, at 500 DA each, and free baths. The resort's busiest period is in Late May to the beginning of June, especially on weekends. There is also a mosque called Sidi Yahia el Aïdli.

The manager of the resort is Gaher Belkacem, a descendant of Sidi Yahia, who was appointed by the owners, the Zawiya of Sidi Yahia, a koranic school.
