= Sidi Brahem Oubarkane Mosque =

Mosque in Bouhamza, Seddouk, Béjaïa, Algeria

- Mosquée Sidi Brahem Oubarkane

Religion
- Affiliation: Islam

Location
- Location: Bouhamza, Seddouk, Béjaïa, Algeria
- Interactive map of Sidi Brahem Oubarkane Mosque
- Coordinates: 36°26′47″N 4°41′20″E

Architecture
- Style: mosque
- Completed: 10th Century

The Sidi Brahem Oubarkane Mosque is a mosque in Bouhamza, Seddouk District, Béjaïa Province, Algeria.

The mosque was constructed in the 10th Century, and is one the oldest surviving mosques in the Soummam valley.

== See also ==
- List of mosques in Algeria
