= Toudert =

Toudert تودرت Tudert
- Village
- Village in Algeria
- Coordinates: 36°27′07″N 4°35′52″E
- Country: Algeria
- Province: Béjaïa Province
- District: Seddouk District
- Commune: Bouhamza

Area
  - Total: 0.5 km^{2} (0.19 sq mi)
- Elevation: 538 m (1,765 ft)
- Time zone: UTC+1 (CET)
- Postal code: 06031

Toudert Arabic: تودرت Kabyle: Tudert is a village in Bouhamza Commune, Seddouk District, Béjaïa Province, Algeria. It is located South of Bouhitem and West of Mahfouda.

The villages name is Kabyle and translates as "the elevated place".

The village contains two cemeteries – Cimetière des Toudert and Cimetière des Martyrs and two mosques – Mosquée Toudert and Mosquée Tala Abdellah.

Several smaller villages make up the village of Touddart; they were built by the villagers on their ancestral lands. They are;

Tazribt Ichaâbanène, Taouint u Meḥaoud, Tighbit, and Tala Abdellah.

== History ==
The village is one of the oldest villages of the Ait Aidel tribe. It is shown on a 1908 map as 'Toudart'.

It was formerly called Aourir u Aidel meaning "the hill of Aidel".

== Agriculture ==
Olives are the main form of agriculture in Toudert, with the fields being home to olive trees, fig trees and prickly pear trees. There is also fruit tree cultivation, such as grapevines, apricots, orange trees and medlar trees.
