= At Brahem =

At Brahem آيت براهم Sahel Ath Brahem
- Village
- Village in Algeria
- Coordinates: 36°24′58″N 4°36′6″E
- Country: Algeria
- Province: Bejaia Province
- District: Seddouk District
- Commune: Bouhamza

Area
  - Total: 0.04 km^{2} (0.015 sq mi)
- Elevation: 240 m (790 ft)
- Time zone: UTC+1 (CET)
- Postal code: 06031

At Brahem Arabic: آيت براهم Kabyle: At Braḥem (Sahel Ath Brahem) is a village in Bouhamza Commune, Béjaïa Province, Algeria. The village is located East of Taxliǧt Icaɛbanen and Sidi Yahia, West of Tagma and southwest of Toudert.

The village's name is Kabyle, and means 'The people of Brahim'.

There is a cemetery in the village.
