= Tindenses =

- Ancient Libyan tribe
- Map of the ancient tribes of Kabylia
- Ethnicity: Ancient Libyans (Berbers)
- Location: Soummam valley
- Confederation: Quinquegentiani
- Demonym: Tindenses
- Language: Old Libyan
- Religion: Libyan religion

The Tindenses or Tyndenses were an ancient Libyan tribe inhabiting the Soummam valley (Nasabath flumen) in Kabylia. They were a part, along four other tribes, of the Quinquegentiani confederation.

== Toponymy ==
The origin of the name Tindenses is unknown.

== Geography ==
Their territory corresponds to the territory of the Ait Waghlis, the Fenaia and the Ait Amer. It is bordered in the west, by the Akfadou pass and, in the south, by the Soummam river. Their neighbors were the Massinissenses and the Feratenses.

The ancient town of Tubusuctu was located inside of their territory.
