= Boumessaoud =

Boumessaoud بومسعود
- Village
- Village in Algeria
- Coordinates: 36°25′28″N 4°34′10″E
- Country: Algeria
- Province: Béjaïa Province
- District: Seddouk District
- Commune: Bouhamza

Area
  - Total: 0.05 km^{2} (0.019 sq mi)
- Elevation: 270 m (890 ft)
- Time zone: UTC+1 (CET)
- Postal code: 06031

Boumessaoud (Arabic: بومسعود), is a small village in Bouhamza Commune, Béjaïa Province, Algeria. It is located Northwest of Tizi Wezrou and Southeast of Tasfart.

The villages name is a Kabyle-Arabic hybrid translating as "the village of Messaoud".
