= Ibouzithen =

Ibouzithen إيبوزيثن
- Village
- Village in Algeria
- Coordinates: 36°26′17.6″N 4°39′18.3″E
- Province: Bejaia Province
- District: Seddouk District
- Commune: Bouhamza

Area
  - Total: 0.18 km^{2} (0.069 sq mi)
- Elevation: 515 m (1,690 ft)
- Time zone: UTC+1 (CET)
- Postal code: 06034

Ibouzithen Arabic: إيبوزيثن Kabyle: Ibuziḍen is a village within Mahfouda Village, in the commune of Bouhamza, in the district of Seddouk, Béjaïa Province, Algeria.

The village's name is Kabyle and translates as "The people of Ziḍ"

In Ibouzithen there is a mosque - Oussaka Mosque (مسجد أوساكا). There is also a cemetery in the village off the W35. There is a tala on Abrid n LʿInsser, just Northwest of the Oussaka Mosque.
