= Ifirakh =

Ifirakh إفراخ
- Village
- Village in Algeria
- Coordinates: 36°26′24″N 4°40′38″E
- Country: Algeria
- Province: Béjaïa Province
- District: Seddouk District
- Commune: Bouhamza

Area
  - Total: 0.12 km^{2} (0.046 sq mi)
- Elevation: 640 m (2,100 ft)
- Time zone: UTC+1 (CET)
- Postal code: 06034

Ifirakh Arabic: إفراخ is a village within Bouhamza, Seddouk District, Béjaïa Province, Algeria.

The villages name is Kabyle and translates as "the pass" or "the gap".
