= Sahel River =

Watercourse in Algeria

Coordinates: 36°25′42″N 4°32′42″E

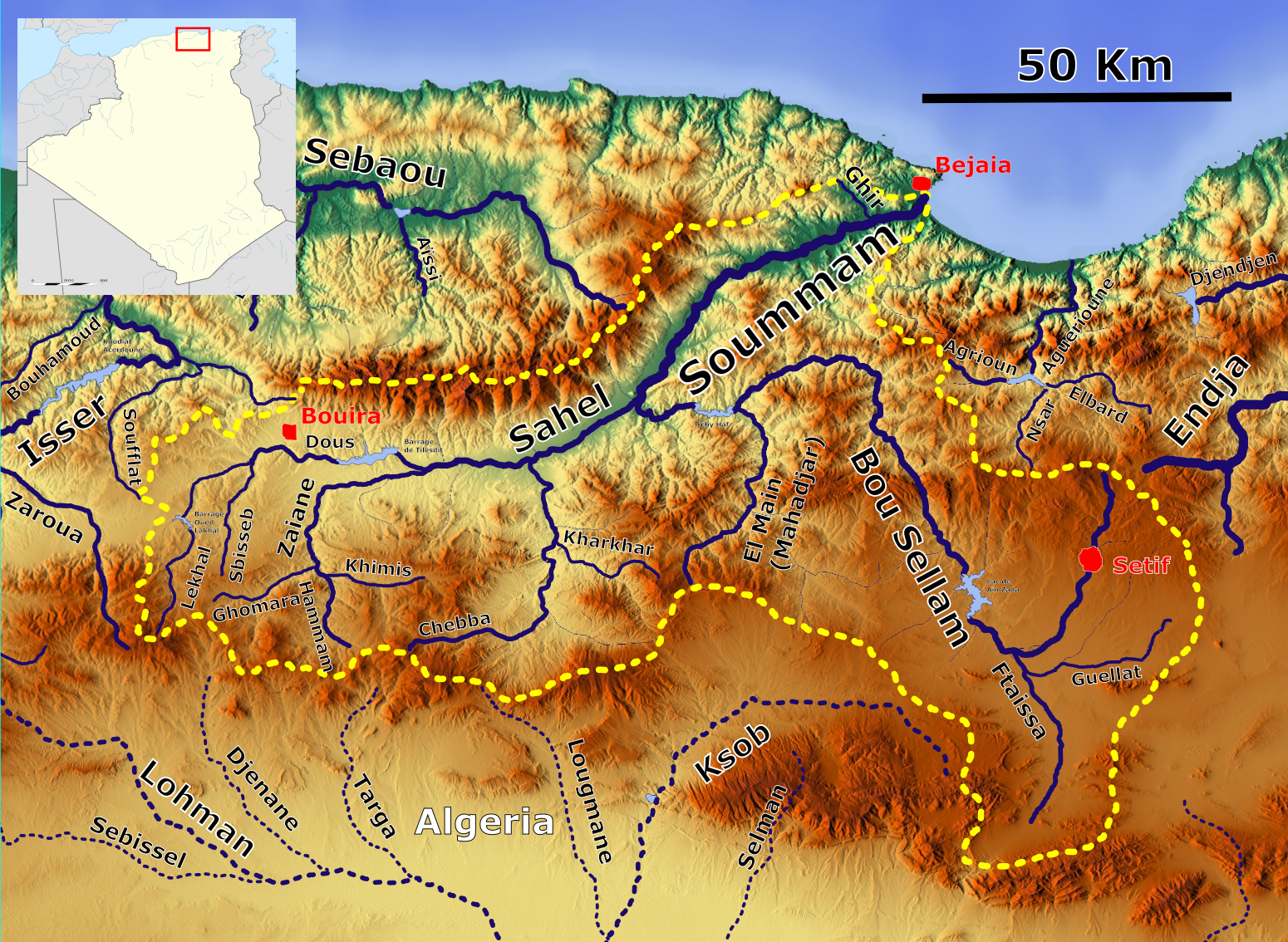
The Soummam basin with Oued Sahel (in the center)

The Sahel River is a river in northern Algeria, which confluence with the Bou Sellam River and forms the Soummam River at Akbou. The basin of the Sahel River (wilaya of Bouira)is about 3,750 km^{2}.
