= Ain Zada Dam =

Dam in Khelil, Algeria

- Location within Algeria
- Official name: Barrage Ain Zada
- Country: Algeria
- Location: Khelil
- Coordinates: 36°10′28″N 05°08′58″E
- Status: Operational
- Construction began: 1982
- Opening date: 1986

Dam and spillways
- Type of dam: Embankment
- Impounds: Bouselam River
- Height: 50 m (164 ft)
- Length: 700 m (2,297 ft)
- Width (crest): 8 m (26 ft)
- Width (base): 260 m (853 ft)
- Dam volume: 2,607,000 m^{3} (3,409,827 cu yd)
- Spillway capacity: 4,370 m^{3}/s (154,325 cu ft/s)

Reservoir
- Total capacity: 125,000,000 m^{3} (101,339 acre⋅ft)
- Surface area: 12 km^{2} (5 sq mi)

The Ain Zada Dam is an embankment dam located 10 km (6 mi) east of Khelil on the Bou-Sellam River in Bordj Bou Arréridj Province, Algeria. Constructed between 1982 and 1986, the primary purpose of the dam is supplying drinking and irrigation water to Sétif, located 24 km (15 mi) to the west.
