= Beni Maouche =

Beni Maouche At Wemeɛuc (Kabyle) Aït Maouche
- Commune
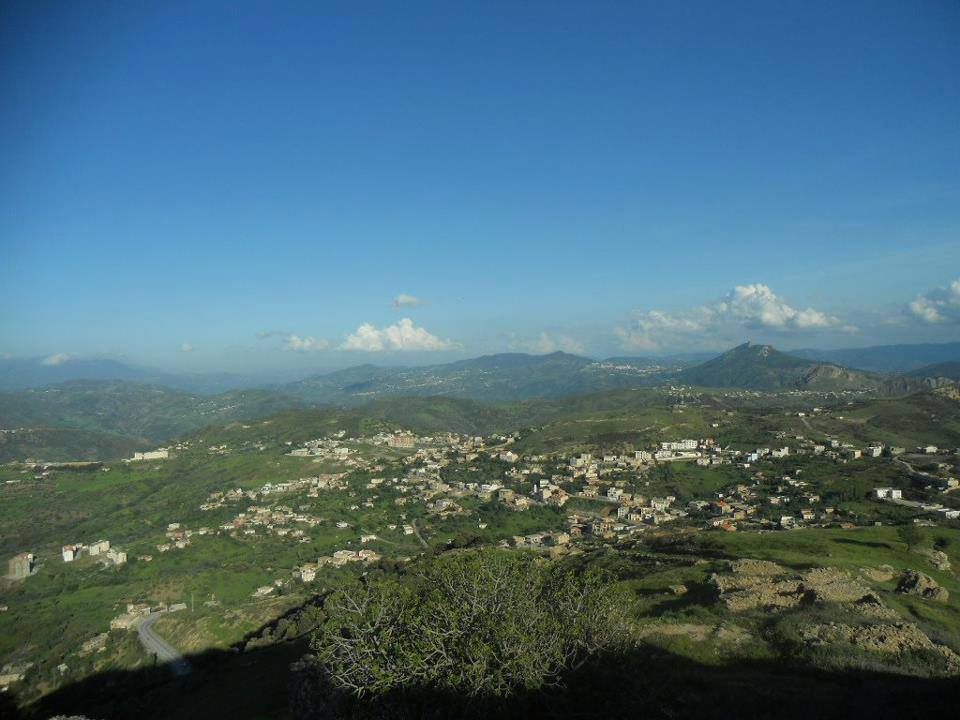

- Location within Algeria
- Coordinates: 36.28°N 4.38°E
- Country: Algeria
- Province: Bejaia

Area
  - Total: 94.86 km^{2} (36.63 sq mi)
- Elevation: 1,000 m (3,300 ft)

Population (2008)
  - Total: 13,412
  - Density: 141/km^{2} (370/sq mi)
- Time zone: UTC+1 (West Africa Time)
- Postal code: 06024

Beni Maouche or Aït Maouche (Kabyle: At Wemeɛuc) is a commune in northern Algeria in the Béjaïa Province. Its population as of 2008 general population and housing census was 13,412. Agricultural products from the commune include olive oil and Beni Maouche dried figs.

The commune borders Mecisna, Beni Djellil, Feraoun, Beni Mouhli, Beni Chebana, Beni Ourtilane, El Main, Amalou, Bouhamza, and Seddouk.

== History ==
The village was located in the lands of the Ath-Aidel clan before the French colonial era.

The French first renamed the village to El Caf Beni Kheyar, before renaming the village to its current official name in homage to the village Caïd (chief) of the Maouche lineage.

The commune was under military administration. When the French shifted to civil administration in the 19th Century they incorporated Beni Maouche into Guergour mixed commune.

During the Algerian War more than 1,014 shaheeds from the commune were killed in combat. The commune was considered by the French as a stronghold of ALN and FLN resistance.

Many well known fighters came from the commune including

- Commander Si Hmimi Oufadhel

- Si Arezki l'aures

- Boukider Slimane

- Bourdouz Abderrahamane

- Ounas Arab

- Chellah Mohand El Mouloud

- Hilem Saad

There was a 4.5 magnitude earthquake in the commune on November 10th, 2000. The epicentre was in Béni Ourtilane District.

== Toponymy ==
During the French occupation, the "Bureaux arabes" forcibly renamed Kabyle toponyms to Arabic ones.

== Geography ==
The commune is made up of several villages including Tizert and Taourirt.

== Economy ==
The town of Letnayen has a market on Mondays which is considered one of the most important in the region.

The region is known for the Beni Maouche dried fig. The exporter Tamzali exported these figs until the Late 1960s to 14 European countries. There is an area of nearly 1,000 ha in the commune specifically for cultivation of gigs. The annual harvest is estimated at 9000 quintals

The commune is dubbed as "first, in milk production" due to high abundance of milk.

The commune is renowned for its car mechanics, where there are "no less than 100 regular repairers".

== Climate ==
The territory of the commune is generally very steep with tall mountains with ridges where villages are located. The highest point is Ouchtoug - 1376 metres above sea level.

The Southern boundary of the commune follows the Bou Sellam River, in which several streams flow into off the hillside.

The communes climate is semi arid due to irregular rain.

== Culture ==
The first Kabyle film La Colline Oubliée (1997) was filmed in the commune. The film stars Djamila Amzal, Mohammed Abbes and Kamal Abderrahmane.

== Notable residents ==
- Commander Si Hmimi Oufadhel, of Aguemoune. Head of the security of the Soummam Congress in 1956.
- Arezki Laures, of Tala N'Tinzar. Member of Mostefa Ben Boulaïd's group in the Aurès.
- Boukider Slimane, of Tiwel, fighter.
- Bourdouz Abderrahmane, of Tagounith-Ighil, politician. Named after in the cadet school in Béjaïa.
- Battache Ali, of Aguemoune, historian and writer.
- Akli Kebaili, of Tiwel, writer and Berber activist
- Lamari Idris, of Aguemoune, Berber activist, and one of the detainees of the Berber Spring on April 20, 1980.
- Cherif Hamia, of Ait-Adjissa, boxing champion, who won the Golden Gloves on June 16, 1953 in Chicago.
