= Tighilt n'Trahi =

Tighilt n'Trahi تِيغِيلْت التابعة لِتْرَاحِي
- Village
- Village in Algeria
- Coordinates: 36°26′45.9″N 4°38′46.0″E
- Province: Bejaia Province
- District: Seddouk District
- Commune: Bouhamza

Area
  - Total: 0.07 km^{2} (0.027 sq mi)
- Elevation: 605 m (1,985 ft)
- Time zone: UTC+1 (CET)
- Postal code: 06031

Tighilt n'Trahi Arabic: تِيغِيلْت التابعة لِتْرَاحِي is a village within Mahfouda Village, Bouhamza Commune, Seddouk District, Béjaïa Province, Algeria. It is located Southeast of Ighil N Tala.

The village's name is Kabyle and translates as "The small hill of the Trahi family".

There is a water tower in the village, off the W35.
