= Sidi-Ayad =

Sidi-Ayad Sidi Ɛeyyad (Kabyle)
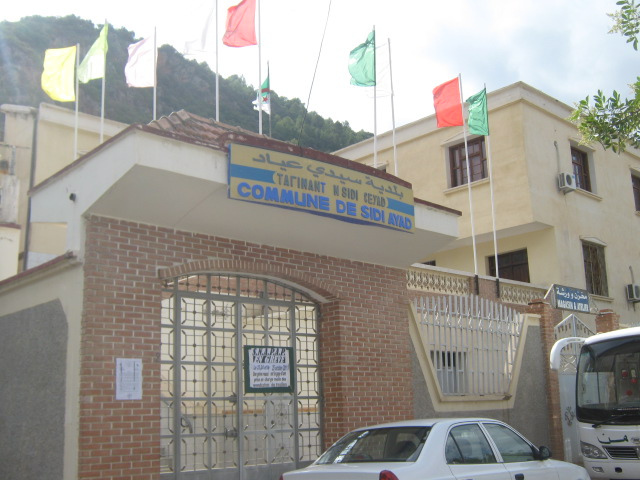

- Location within Algeria
- Coordinates: 36.68333°N 4.05°E
- Country: Algeria
- Province: Béjaïa
- Time zone: UTC+1 (West Africa Time)

Sidi-Ayad (Kabyle: Sidi Ɛeyyad) is a commune in northern Algeria in the Béjaïa Province in the Kabylia region.

== Geography ==
3 kilometers from the Soummam River in Béjaïa Province. It is made up of four villages (Hamam, Thakhlichth, Azrou and Maala) and is known for its resistance, with the rest of the region, in the War of Independence. It is a poor town due to lack of government investment and much of the population's income comes from immigrants in Europe and other cities. Local agriculture involves mainly olive trees.
