= Chemini =

Chemini Cemmini (Kabyle)
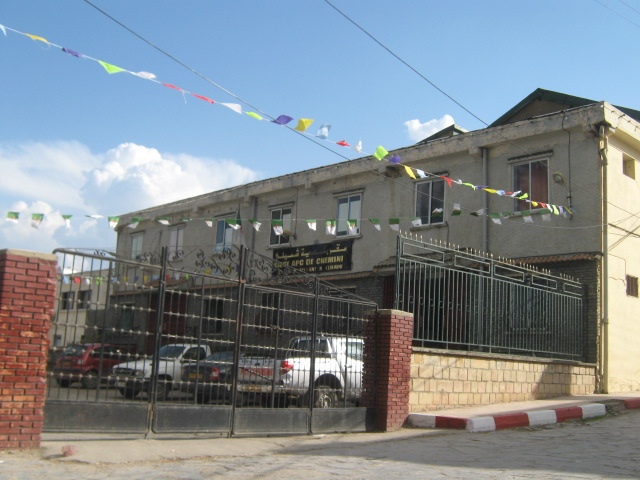
- Chemini municipality headquarters

- Location within Algeria
- Coordinates: 36°36′N 4°37′E
- Country: Algeria
- Province: Bejaia

Government
  - President of Assembly: Madjid Ouddak

Area
  - Total: 39.04 km^{2} (15.07 sq mi)
- Elevation: 852 m (2,795 ft)
- Highest elevation: 1,600 m (5,200 ft)
- Lowest elevation: 700 m (2,300 ft)

Population (2008)
  - Total: 15,274
  - Density: 391/km^{2} (1,010/sq mi)
- Time zone: UTC+1 (West Africa Time)
- Postal code: 06770

Chemini (Kabyle: Cemmini; Arabic: شميني) is a commune in northern Algeria in the Béjaïa Province, about 60 km southwest of the provincial capital. As of 2008, the town has a population of 15,274.

== Geography ==
Chemini is located on the bank of Soummam River, in the western part of the Béjaïa Province. It borders Akfadou to the north, Seddouk to the east, Ouzellaguen to the south and Bouzeguene to the west.

== Administrative divisions ==
In 1984, the commune of Chemini was formed from the following localities:

- Agueni
- Aït Chemini
- Aït Ouragh
- Aït Soula
- Aït Zadi
- Bouchachiou
- Boumelal
- Chemini
- Djenane
- Il Maten
- Larbaa
- Imaliouène
- Loudha
- Semaoune
- Sidi Hadj Hassaine
- Sidi Yahia
- Taghrast
- Taguemount
- Takrietz
- Takhlicht
- Takourabt
- Tazroutz
- Tidjounane
- Tighilt
- Tissira

== History ==
The commune of Chemini corresponds to the former commune of Djenane during the French occupation. The commune of Djenane was in turn under the Department of Sétif, former sub-prefecture of the Department of Constantine until 1957. After Algerian independence, Chemini became a commune of the Sétif Province before getting integrated into Béjaïa Province when it was created in 1974.

== Famous people ==
- Mabrouk Belhocine, a writer, historian and activist for Algerian independence, as well as a former senior official of the Provisional Government of the Algerian Republic
- Mohand Amokrane Maouche, the first president of the Algerian Football Federation
- Boudjemâa Agraw, real name Boudjemaâ Ouddane, a Kabyle singer
- Iris, real name Mohand-Lyazid Chibout, a Kabyle author, poet, editor and journalist
- Mohand Akli Haddadou, a Kabyle linguist and author
