= Tichy-Haf Dam =

Dam in Béjaïa, Algeria

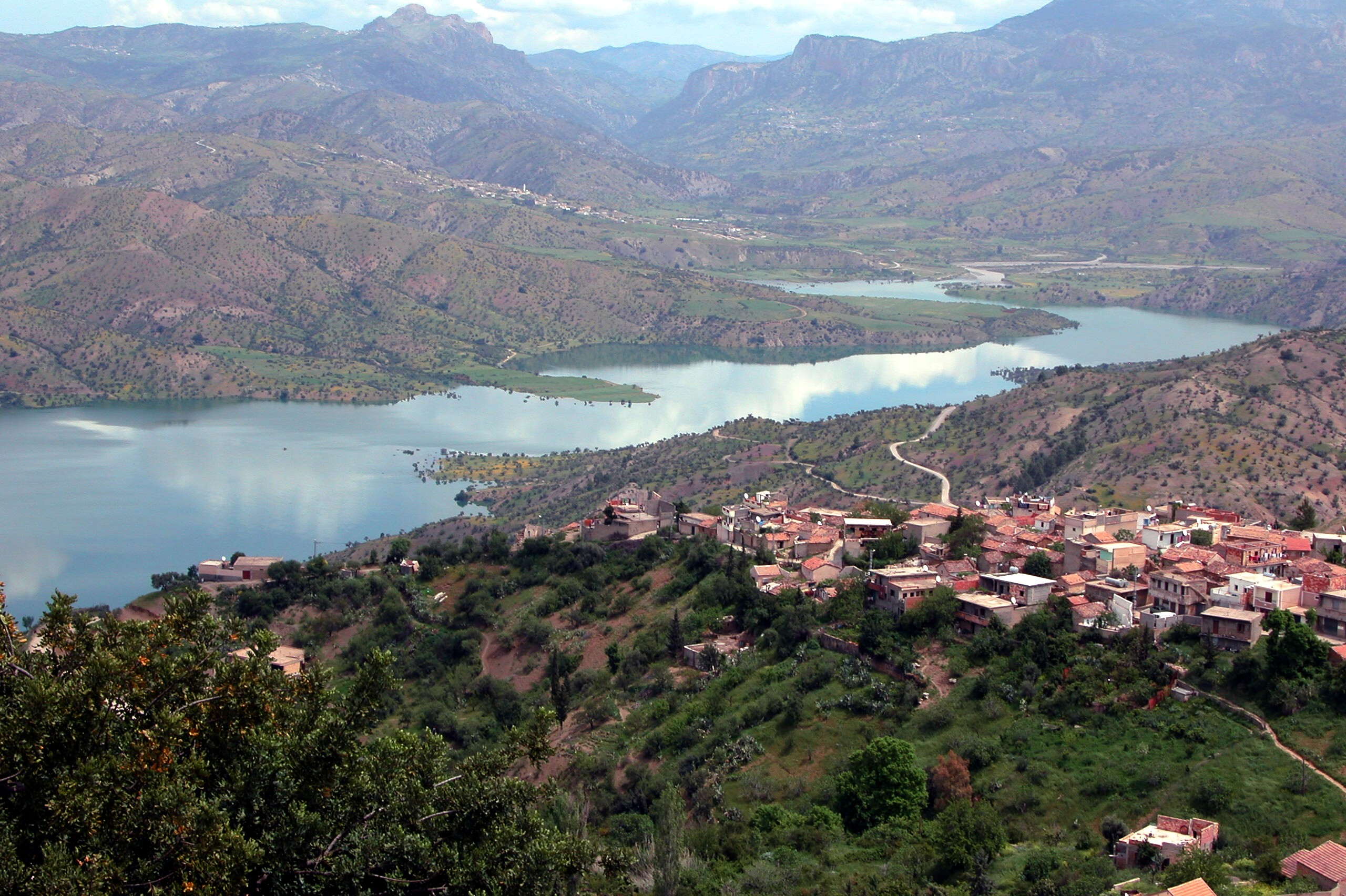

- Dam in Algeria
- Country: Algeria
- Location: Béjaïa
- Coordinates: 36°25′45.05″N 4°39′8.46″E
- Purpose: Irrigation
- Construction began: 1999
- Opening date: 2009
- Owner: Agence Nationale des Barrages et Transferts

Dam and spillways
- Type of dam: Arch-gravity dam
- Height (foundation): 90 m

Reservoir
- Creates: Tichy-Haf Reservoir
- Total capacity: 80 million cubic metres
- Surface area: 5km2
- Maximum length: 2km

The Tichy-Haf dam is an Arch–gravity dam on the Oued Bousellam in Mahfouda, Bouhamza Commune, Béjaïa, Algeria.

== Background ==
Construction of the dam started in the Late 1990s by Yugoslav company Hydrotchnika, and later completed by Algerian company Cosider Group. The dam was finished by 2008, and opened on 26th February 2009. The dam produces 47 million cubic metres per year of drinking water for the Akbou-Béjaïa corridor, and 43 million cubic metres per year for irrigation. Near to the dam is the Tichy-Haf Treatment Plant, which has a capacity of 120,000 cubic metres per day, a 70km long pipeline and storage tanks with a capacity of 42,000 m^{3} (1,500,000 cu ft).

The construction of the dam and reservoir was on former farmland, which the local residents protested the construction in the 2000s and in 2011. In 2023 the dam was only at 6% capacity, this led to boreholes being dug in the valley and the reservoir being partially dried.

Local residents frequently use the dam and reservoir for swimming, diving, boating, and there are olive trees lining the river bank.Fishing also occurs on the reservoir, for Common carp and Common bream. However, it is dangerous to swim or dive too close to the dam.
