= Mohand Amokrane Maouche =

Algerian football executive

- Muḥend Ameqqran Wemɛuc
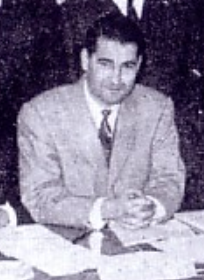

President of Algerian Olympic Committee
- In office 1963–1965
- Preceded by: Position established
- Succeeded by: Hadj Omar Dahmoun

President of Algerian Football Federation
- In office 1962–1969
- Preceded by: Position established
- Succeeded by: Mustapha Benouniche

Vice President of the Confederation of African Football
- In office 1969–1971

Personal details
- Born: 11 August 1925 Sidi Aïch, French Algeria
- Died: 2 January 1971 (aged 45) Tripoli, Libya
- Cause of death: Plane crash
- Education: University of Algiers 1
- Occupation: Sports executive, physician

Mohand Amokrane Maouche (Kabyle: Muḥend Ameqqran Wemɛuc; born 11 August 1925 in Sidi Aïch, Algeria – died 2 January 1971 in a plane crash near Tripoli, Libya) was an Algerian football executive.

A physician by training, Maouche developed a strong interest in football from an early age. He was the founder and first president of the Algerian Football Federation (FAF), which he led from 1962 to 1969. He was also the first president of the Algerian Olympic Committee (COA), serving from 1963 to 1965.

== Biography ==
Mohand Maouche was born on 11 August 1925 in Tissira, in the commune of Sidi-Aïch, into a modest family. He was an athlete and footballer, while also pursuing studies culminating in a doctorate in medicine. He became university champion of the 100 metres in Constantine. After moving to Algiers, he began a football career with Red Star Algérois between 1946 and 1953, scoring 12 goals in the Division d'Honneur during the 1950–51 season. He stopped playing for the club following a request from politicians of the Algerian nationalist movement asking Muslim athletes not to play within teams composed of European players. He then played briefly for MC Alger before retiring definitively.

== Administrative career ==
=== Algerian Football Federation ===
In 1962, Mohand Maouche founded the Algerian Football Federation (FAF) and was elected its first president. He launched the country's first national championship, known as the "Critérium", while also reorganizing the main regional leagues. Maouche further established the Algerian Cup as a nationwide knockout competition.

=== Algerian Olympic Committee ===
In 1963, Mohand Maouche initiated the creation of the Algerian Olympic Committee (COA) and was elected its first president on 23 October of that year. In January 1964, along with Mustapha Larfaoui, he submitted Algeria's application for membership to the International Olympic Committee, which officially recognized the COA on 27 January 1964 in Innsbruck.

=== Confederation of African Football ===
In December 1965, in Tunis, Mohand Maouche called for a revision of the statutes of the Confederation of African Football (CAF), which he considered too favorable to Egypt. After being elected to the executive committee and becoming Vice-President of CAF, he promoted a development-oriented policy. On 5 February 1970, at the CAF General Assembly in Khartoum, he and Mawade Wade introduced a motion to create a special commission to revise the statutes and regulations of CAF. The motion was approved by 20 of the 34 member associations. Although a member of the commission, Maouche did not live to see its conclusions, which were adopted on 21 February 1972 in Yaoundé.

== Death ==
Mohand Maouche died on 2 January 1971 in a plane crash, about 7 km from Tripoli International Airport in Libya, during a flight from Algiers to Cairo. He was on board with seven other passengers, all of whom died along with the eight crew members.
