= Tala Abdellah =

Tala Abdellah عين عبد الله Tala Aɛbdellah
- Village
- Village in Algeria
- Coordinates: 36°26′17.6″N 4°35′59.0″E
- Country: Algeria
- Province: Béjaïa Province
- District: Seddouk District
- Commune: Bouhamza

Area
  - Total: 0.16 km^{2} (0.062 sq mi)
- Elevation: 423 m (1,388 ft)
- Time zone: UTC+1 (CET)
- Postal code: 06031

Tala Abdellah Arabic: عين عبد الله Kabyle: Tala Aɛbdellah is a village within Toudert village, Bouhamza Commune, Seddouk District, Béjaïa Province, Algeria.

The villages name is Kabyle and translates as "Abdellah's Spring".

There is a mosque in the village called Mosquée Tala Abdellah.
