= Rachid Ferhani =

Algerian singer (1945–2025)

- Born: 5 January 1945; El Flaye, Algeria
- Died: 13 August 2025 (aged 80)
- Occupation: Singer
- Years active: 1963–2025

Rachid Ferhani (5 January 1945 – 13 August 2025) was an Algerian Kabyle singer.

== Life and career ==
Ferhani was born in El-Flaye on 5 January 1945. He began singing at the age of 18, and his song Assa Tamaghra, recorded in 1971, became a common feature at wedding parties and gatherings in Kabylie.

Ferhani died on 13 August 2025, at the age of 80.
