= Mahfouda =

Mahfouda محفوضة
- Village
- Village in Algeria
- Coordinates: 36°26′25″N 4°38′59″E
- Province: Bejaia Province
- District: Seddouk District
- Commune: Bouhamza

Area
  - Total: 1.02 km^{2} (0.39 sq mi)
- Elevation: 591.27 m (1,939.9 ft)

Population
  - Total: 4,500
- Time zone: UTC+1 (CET)
- Postal code: 06031

Mahfouda Arabic: محفوضة Kabyle: Imeḥfuḍen is a village within the commune of Bouhamza in the wilayah of Béjaïa in Algeria.

The village is located North of the Oued Bousellam, South of Ighil N Tala, and West of Bouhamza. In the Southern end of the village is the Tichy-Haf Dam and reservoir, which were built 1999–2009, and is a 90 metre high arch dam with a capacity of 80 million cubic metres. It was commissioned to supply the 25 communes in the Akbou-Béjaïa corridor. There were demonstrations from the villagers who wanted compensation for their land which was used to build the reservoir.

The village includes the hamlets/villages of Ibouzithen, Tighilt and Tighilt n'Trahi.

The village has two mosques - Al-Nur Mosque (مسجد النور) and Nouvelle Mosque (المسجد الجديد).

In Tighilt there is a mosque - Tighit Mosque (مسجد تيغيت), and on the W35 at 36.4425892, 4.6495279 is the village shop, Chez Si Lahlou Oumerzoug (Tahanut n Si Lahlou), which opened in 1984 and sold vegetables, kitchen items and dairy products. The shop was a community hub and during the 1980s, the villagers met at the shop to play board games such as Taxxatemt and Acarreg n Lehlawat. The shop later sold phone accessories.

In Tighilt is the Cimetière n les Bezzou, which is opposite a mosque and the Cimetière n Tighilt.

In Ibouzithen there is a mosque - Oussaka Mosque (مسجد أوساكا). There is also a cemetery in the village off the W35. There is a tala on Abrid n LʿInsser, just Northwest of the Oussaka Mosque.

== History ==
The Kabyle name "Imeḥfuḍen / ⵉⵎⴻⵃⴼⵓⴹⴻⵏ" probably comes from Berber meaning "protected" or "guarded", with the modern Arabic name being a later adaption.

The village is shown on a 1927 map of Algeria as "Mahafouda"

There are many ancient remains from the Numidian period in the commune, with Stelae dating back to the 4th Century BC. Many villages in the area were burned by Emperor Maximian in 282 AD, which led to the resistance of in 371 AD. The villages remained largely untouched during the Medieval period. During the French occupation, the population supported Ahmed Bey's revolt in 1832, and the 1833 liberation of Béjaïa.

In Mahfouda village, on April 14, 1959, was the Chafa Tamellalt Massacre by the French colonial army on resistance fighters in a cave. Witness to the massacre, Rachid Challal describes the massacre as "The occupying army, keeping shepherd dogs on a leash, besieged Tighremt early in the morning and brought out all its inhabitants to gather them at the village cemetery. To flush out Mouloud Ahaddad N'Tmokra, Belkacem Irbah N'Vicher and all those who were hiding, the French soldiers destroyed everything in their path. All the Ichvouyla of olive oil and all the Ikoufen of wheat, products of all our harvests, were broken. To annihilate those who had taken refuge there, the enemy had initially bombarded the cave with a mortar placed on the other side of the Boussellam wadi before dynamiting the hole. The assault being very risky, knowing that the cave is located in a cliff that is difficult to access, the colonial army had no other solution than to inject asphyxiating gases into the cave using a helicopter sent as reinforcements"

== Economy ==
The economy of the village is largely agricultural, with the village growing olives, but also livestock farming. There is also minor tourism to the Tichy-Haf dam and reservoir.
