= Bouhitem =

Village in Algeria

Bouhitem بوحيتم Buḥiṭem
- Village
- Village in Algeria
- Coordinates: 36°27′07″N 4°35′52″E
- Country: Algeria
- Province: Béjaïa Province
- District: Seddouk District
- Commune: Bouhamza

Area
  - Total: 0.23 km^{2} (0.089 sq mi)
- Elevation: 604 m (1,982 ft)
- Time zone: UTC+1 (CET)
- Postal code: 06031

Bouhitem Arabic: بوحيتم Kabyle: Buḥiṭem is a village in Bouhamza Commune, Seddouk District, Béjaïa Province, Algeria. It is located just northeast of Takhlidjt Ichachoaen, Northwest of Toudert and southwest of Ighil n Tala.

The village is an Arabic-Kabyle hybrid, and is likely a surname. 'Bou-' meaning 'father of'.

In 2020 25 metre high Sonelgaz galvanized pylons were installed in the village by the Operational Directorate of Béjaïa.
