= Aghiles =

Aghiles or Aghilas a Berber name mainly widespread in the Kabylie region and in the Tamanrasset region of Algeria.It literally means "Lion" in the Amazigh language.

Notable people named Aghlies include:

- Aghilès Benchaâbane, Algerian footballer
- Aghiles Slimani, Algerian swimmer
