= Hamid Tibouchi =

Algerian painter and poet

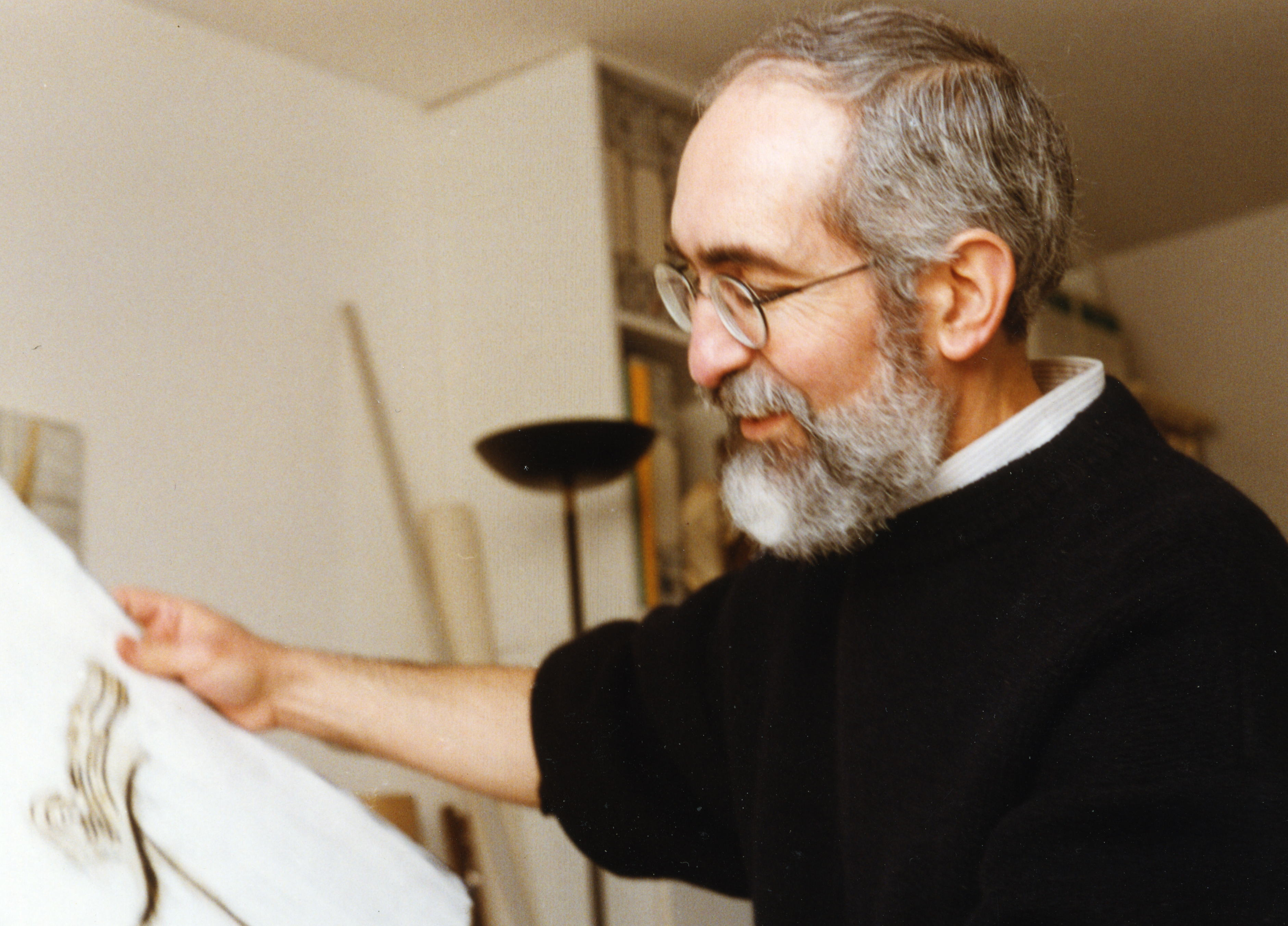
- 1997
- Born: 1951 (age 74–75); Tibane
- Occupations: Writer, painter and poet

Hamid Tibouchi (Arabic: حميد تيبوشي) is an Algerian painter and poet, born in 1951 Tibane, near Bejaia in the Kabylie region. He began painting at the age of ten and began writing in 1966. He studied at the High School in Kouba and became a friend of Taher Djaout, and taught English for a while near Algiers.

== Biography ==
He became involved in writing poetry, and published his first texts in 1971 in Algeria, France and Tunisia.

He then published several pamphlets and collections that made him one of the pioneers of French poetry as described by Jean Sénac. His poems have been translated into Spanish and Italian and many of his poems are taught in Algerian textbooks. Taher Djaout described him as "one of the most demanding and adventurous poets of his generation" in 1984. Hamid practiced poetry and painting at the same time, and believes that poetry and painting are one thing.

Since 1980 Tibouchi has exhibited his work in Algeria and Tunisia, and resided in Paris in 1981. He graduated from the Faculty of Visual Arts of the University of Paris VIII. He then held about 20 personal exhibitions in Paris, Spain and New York. He also participated in a large number of group events in France, Europe and the Arab world, With the main manifestations of contemporary Algerian art. He participated in the Salon des Réalités Nouvelles in 1984, in the engraving department, and from 1988 to 1997 in the painting department.

== Museums and artworks ==
- Jordan National Gallery of Fine Arts
- The British Museum, London
- The National Museum of Fine Arts of Algiers

== Artworks ==
Works by Hamid Tibouchi

- "The Open Sea", (Arabic: albahr almaftuh) Paris, personal editions, 1973.
- "Soleil d’herbe", (Arabic: suly dihirbi) Paris, Chambelland editions, 1974.
- "Lost Love", (Arabic: alhub mafqud) Sour El-Ghozlane (Algeria),1977.
- "La mer", (Arabic: la myr) in collaboration with Louis-Marie Catta, Adonis and Hassan Massoudy, Paris, 1991.
- Pansies, snow and mimosas, (Arabic: zuhur albansii walthalj walmimuza) Paris, La Tarente, 1994.
- "Giclures", Paris, La Tarente, 1995.
- "Herbes rousses",(Arabic: hrbis rusis) artist's book, Paris, 1999.
- "A single tree", (Arabic: shajara wahida) Paris, La Tarente, 2001.
- "Chemistry", (Arabic: kimya') cover by Slimane Ould Mohand, Niort, Le Figuier de Barbarie, 2002.
- "Ribs", imprints and washes, (Arabic: al'adlae walmatbueat walghasil) La Rochelle, 2003.
- "Ribes", (Arabic: ribs) Trois-Rivieres (Quebec).
- "By fertile paths", (Arabic: bialmasarat alkhisiba) Le Moulin du Roc, Niort, 2008.
