= Amour Abdenour =

Amour Abdenour Ɛemmur Ɛebdennur
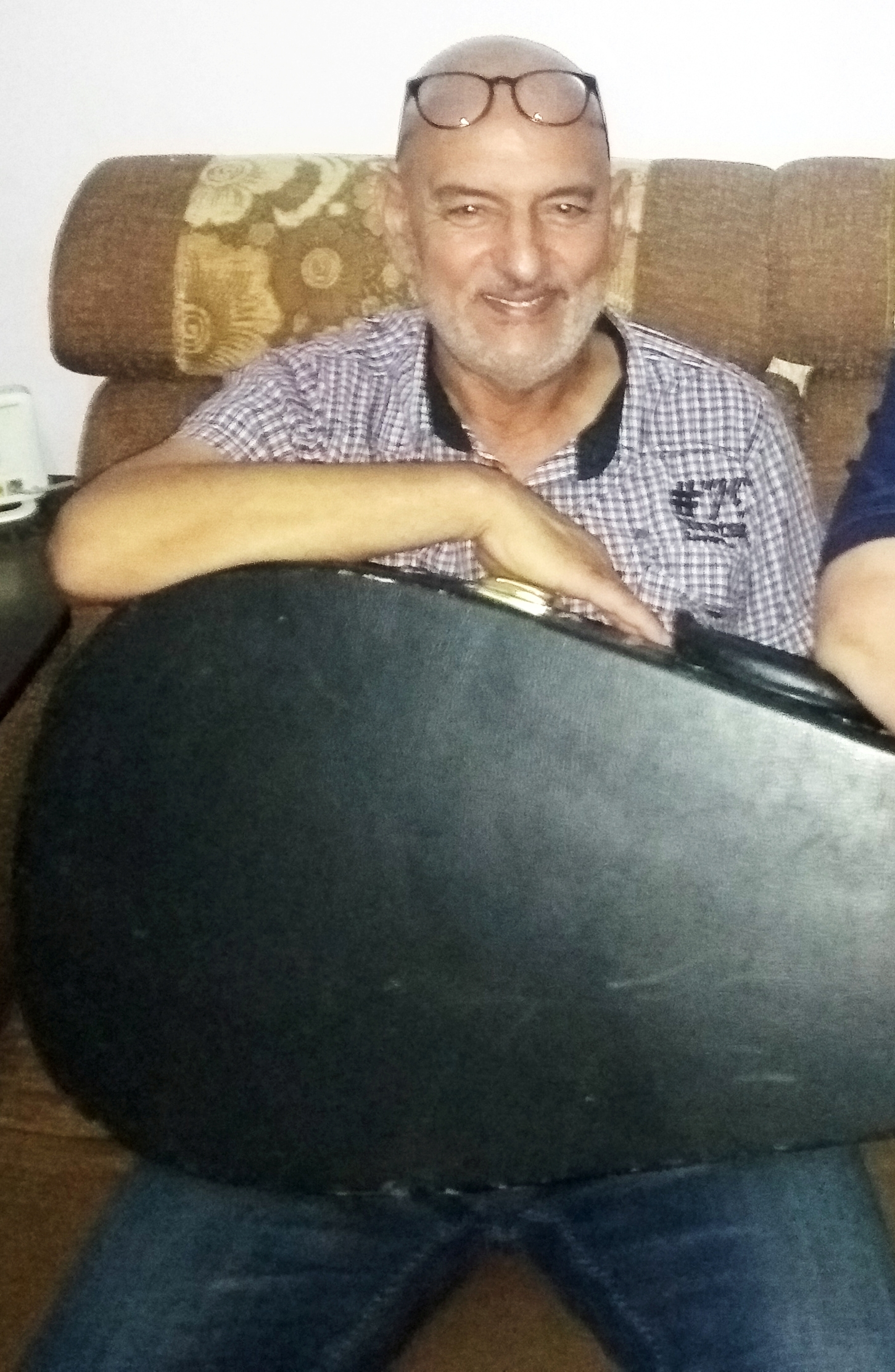
- Amour at a concert in Tala Athmane

Background information
- Born: February 17, 1952 (age 74); Béjaïa, Algeria
- Genres: Kabyle, Folk
- Instruments: Vocal, guitar, flute, goblet drum (darbouka)
- Years active: 1969 – present

Amour Abdenour (Kabyle: Ɛemmur Ɛebdennur, ⵄⴻⵎⵎⵓⵕ ⵄⴻⴱⴷⴻⵏⵏⵓⵕ, Arabic: عمور عبد النور), born February 17, 1952, in Leflaye, near Béjaïa, Algeria, is an Algerian Kabyle singer, songwriter and composer.

== Life and career ==
As a young boy, Abdenour was interested in music; he listened to songs on the radio and learned to play the flute, goblet drum (darbouka) and finally the guitar at age of 11.

In 1964, while living with his grandparents, he joined the JFLN, a local cultural association which gave him the opportunity to enrich his talent by attending and participating in local events. In 1968, He moved to Algiers. A year later he wrote and composed his first song, named Yeǧǧa-tt ("Left Alone"), which first aired on the radio in 1970. Busy with his studies and military duty, that he had waited until the end of the 70s to release his first song, starting a long, ongoing career.

== Discography ==
(For detailed discography with the track list of each of the following albums, refer to the French Wikipedia article)

- 1985 : Tifirellas
- 1987 : Mmi-s n tmurt-iw ("The son of my country")
- 1988 : Ruḥ ur d-ttuɣal ("Go Away, Don't Come Back")
- 1989 : Tamdint ("City")
- 1991 : Aεetteb ("Work Hard")
- 1991 : D lεid ("Celebration")
- 1991 : A leflani ("Someone")
- 1992 : Tirza ("Visit")
- 1993 : Σnu-tt ("Deal With Her")
- 1994 : Argu ay ul-iw ("Keep on Dreaming")
- 1995 : A lbaz err-itt-id ("Eagle, Bring her Back")
- 1996 : Ili-k d lkayes
- 1996 : Lebḥer ("Ocean")
- 1997 : Wiss zzman ("If Times")
- 1998 : Amek akka ("Why is That ?")
- 1999 : Nna Crifa ("Aunt Cherifa")
- 2000 : Yelli-s n tmurt ("Country Girl")
- 2001 : Tikwal ("Sometimes")
- 2002 : Ugin azaglu
- 2003 : Ah ya dini ("I'll Be Damned")
- 2004 : Attan attan ("There She Is")
- 2005 : Ma nniɣ-am ("If I Told You")
- 2006 : Uɣal-ed ("Come Back")
- 2007 : Tḥermeḍ ("You Forbid")
- 2008 : Ḥader iman-ik ("Be Careful")
- 2009 : Ay imesdurar ("People of The Mountain")
- 2010 : Iger n ttar ("Revenge")
- 2016 : Err-itt-id ("Get Her Back")
- 2017 : Taɣuri ("Reading")

(xx : denotes unknown year of release)

== External links and sources ==
- [Fr] Amour Abdenour, Zenith 100% kabyle en coulisse
- [Fr] Artist's page on a Kabyle music site
- [Fr] Amour Abdenour revient sur scène
- [Fr] Le chanteur Amour Abdenour invité du plateau "Parole aux artistes"
