= Taourirt, Béjaïa =

Taourirt ثاوريرث Tawrirt
- Village
- Village in Algeria
- Coordinates: 36°28′43″N 4°44′20″E
- Country: Algeria
- Province: Béjaïa Province
- District: Béni Maouche District
- Commune: Beni Maouche

Area
  - Total: 0.14 km^{2} (0.054 sq mi)
- Elevation: 730 m (2,400 ft)
- Time zone: UTC+1 (CET)
- Postal code: 06024

Taourirt Arabic: ثاوريرث. Kabyle: Tawrirt is a village in Beni Maouche, Béni Maouche District, Northern Algeria in the Béjaïa Province.

The historic village is located South of Tizert, and Southwest of Aït Ouamar and Aguemoune.

The village's name is Berber languages and means "hill" or "small mountain".

The village is known for its resistance to colonial rule, and its views of the mountains.

The village was devastated by an 3.5 magnitude earthquake on November 10th 2000.

There is a mosque in the village.

La Colline Oubliee was filmed in the village and in Beni Maouche.

== Notable people ==
- Mohamed Saïl (1894-1953), born in the village
