= Béni Maouche District =

Coordinates: 36.478051°N 4.638441°E

Béni Maouche District Tadayra n It Umɛuc Aït Maouche District
- District
- Country: Algeria
- Province: Béjaïa Province
- Time zone: UTC+1 (CET)

Béni Maouche District or Aït Maouche District (Kabyle: Tadayra n It Umɛuc) is a district of Béjaïa Province, Algeria.

== Municipalities ==
The district has 1 municipality:

- Beni Maouche
