= Bouhamza =

Coordinates: 36°29′23″N 4°36′24″E

Bouhamza Buḥemza (Kabyle)
- Municipality
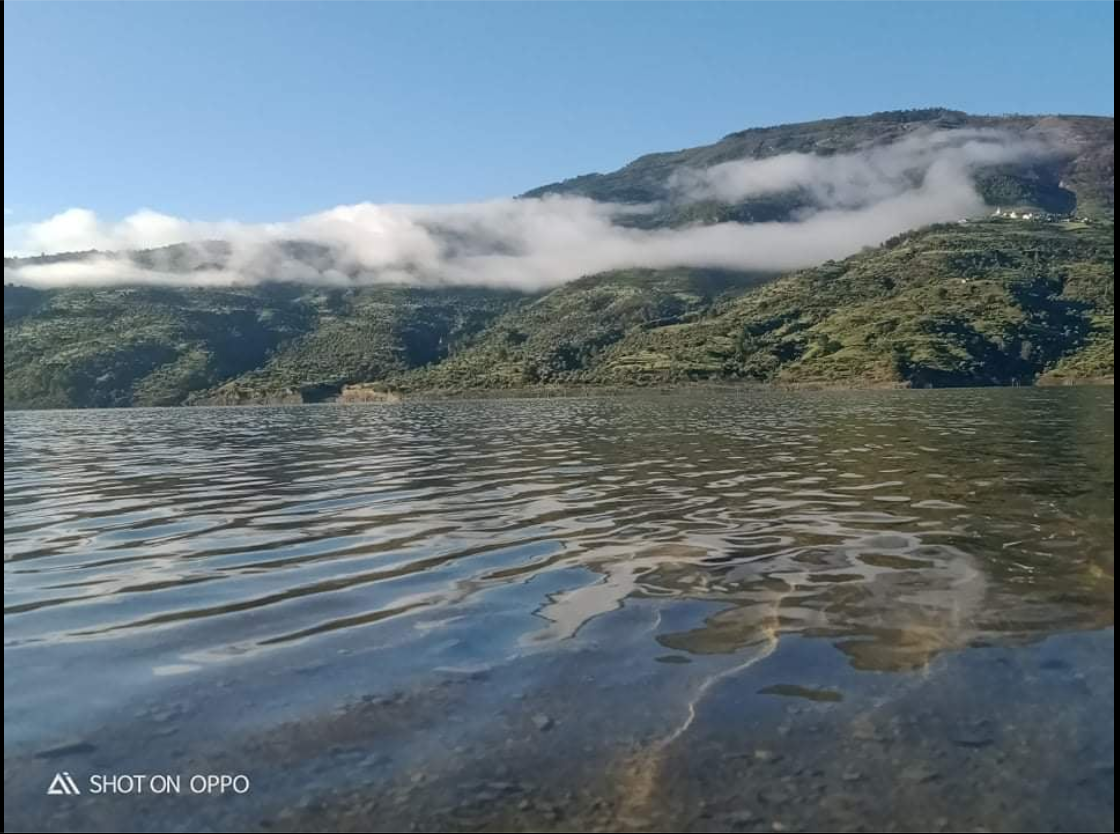
- Interactive map of Bouhamza
- Country: Algeria
- Province: Bejaia

Government
  - Mayor: Hamlat Yacine

Area
  - Total: 778 ha (1,920 acres)
- Elevation: 160 m (520 ft)

Population (2008)
  - Total: 9,123
  - Density: 1,170/km^{2} (3,040/sq mi)
- Time zone: UTC+1 (West Africa Time)

Bouhamza (Kabyle: Buḥemza; Arabic: بوحمزة) is a commune and village in Seddouk District, Northern Algeria in the Béjaïa Province on the banks of the Bou Sellam River.

== History ==
The former name was Ighil Aberkane, which translates as "the black mountain". The name 'Bouhamza' first appeared at the end of the 16th Century during the rebellion against the Spanish, led by a Turk called Hamza. The current name is Arabic and translates to "The place of Hamza"

In the Northwestern area of the commune, in the village of Tasfart are the prehistoric Gueldaman caves.

There are many ancient remains from the Numidian period in the commune, with Stelae dating back to the 4th Century BC. Many villages in the area were burned by Emperor Maximian in 282 AD, which led to the resistance of in 371 AD. The villages remained largely untouched during the Medieval period. During the French occupation, the population supported Ahmed Bey's revolt in 1832, and the 1833 liberation of Béjaïa.

In Late November 1957, many villages in Bouhamza commune were evacuated after an ambush at Ighzar n Tissemt in early November. Fighter jets shot at civilians of Tansaout and Tachaouaft nearby Mahfouda.

During the Algerian War the village was bombed on 16th December 1958 by B-26 aircraft dropping five-quintal bombs and napalm. Soldier, Albert Naour described it as "The village destroyed by the bombs became an open air cemetery". A helicopter took off from Gueldaman to transport soldiers to occupy the village. Corpses were thrown into the air by the force of the explosions, which sent up enormous columns of smoke that pierced the sky. Three raids reduced the village to ruins. Following the air attacks, French soldiers stormed the village and ransacked houses. Some residents reported a death figure of 80, however some witnesses claim it was a lot higher, with the Moudjahid testimony claiming there were 150 victims. Some claim 85 people were killed in 5 minutes.

There were protests in the village on 11th December 1962

On March 25, 1968, a group of youths, who were playing with a shell casing in Taourirt village, died after the shell exploded. The victims were Benmedjedoub Mouloud (1950-1968), and brothers Benmedjane Hamid and Mohand Ameziane, known as Bezza and Ahcene, and two more injured, irbah Mohand Arab and Irbah Athmane.

A shell from the war was recently discovered during road clearing in a forest near Tachouaft.

In Mahfouda village is the Tichy-Haf Dam and reservoir, which were built 1999-2009, and is a 90 metre high arch dam with a capacity of 80 million cubic metres. It was commissioned to supply the 25 communes in the Akbou-Béjaïa corridor. There were demonstrations from the villagers who wanted compensation for their land which was used to build the reservoir.

Victims of the 1958 bombing

Bouhamza village

- Balit family: Salem, 53 and his wife Djedjiga Tamzalt; Abderrahmane, 22; Mohand Seghir, 12; Mohand Abdelouhab, 5; Adada, 3; Keltoum, 45; Rokia, 48, the wife of Imekhloufen Md Cherif, and her daughter Djida, the mother of Hocine Oubalit; Ait Habib Quiza, who died in Sétif Hospital; Chenna Megdouda, 23, wife of Balit Abdelkader.

- Baha (Oubaha) Mouloud family: Balit Tounisia, pregnant, and her children: Idir, 7; Madjid, 4; and Taous. One survivor, Mahmoud.

- Bendjouadi family: Mohand Quaamar Oudjouadi, 28; mother Bensikhaled Zoubida, 21, pregnant; and their baby Razika (Taklit), 1.

- Belhoul family: Mohand Quai, 53; Keltoum, 1; Ourdia, née Madjakdoud, 52; Ibelhoulen Salah, 4; Ibdelhoulen M'Hand.

- Oubouchou family: Amriche Tounsia, wife of Mohand Tahar; their children Hamid and Ouiza

- Bensadoune family: Mokhtar and his wife Betitra, mother of Yahia.

- Benbahmad family: Youcef, Zahra, Maklouf

- Imekhloufene family: Djida, 6, daughter of Mohand Cherif and Balit Rekia; Taalit, and her daughter Aicha; Ouhmeni Mohand Amokrane (Ou Si Belkacem), 55, Zerrou (Ouzerouh) Mohand Akli, 51; Chebah Tata, 37; Ait Amrane Rebiha, 12; Kennouche Mokand Akli, 55; Boukhezar Mohand Quali, 8; Amzal Djedjiga, Tata Outyahia, the wife of Laamri (Akli Zermani), Dahgane Aicha; Amriche Taous; Amzal Salem, 52; Ait Amrane Rebiha; Bencheikh Cherifa, wife of Kennouche Mohand Quamar, pregnant.

- Baha Ali (1919-1958). Buried at Bouhamza Cemetery. The village school is named after him. Ali was involved in local resistance of French rule from 1945 until 1955 when he joined the army, and was later promoted to a senior officer. In 1956 he was transferred to the Tablat region.

Tachouaft village

- Arezki or Si Ahmed family (Balit): Balit Arezki, 46; Benmeziane Adidi, his wife, 32; and children, Boualem, 7 and Tayakout, 11; one survivor, Ahmed. Imekhloufene Tallit, 33, daughter of Mohand Tahar el Betsadoune El Ghaia, wife of Benatsou Mohand Oulhadi, and her daughter Aicha, 12, Balit Zahra, 5; Benmeziane Abdeslam and his wife Beomeziane Sakina, Adjenad Arezki (Mokrane), 12; Tassift H'mimi (Ahmed), 56; Benatsou Mohand Tayeb (Mohand Tahar) Benmeziane Chehla, 27; Benmeziane Hadjila, 7; Benmeziane Bouzid, 5; Ladiadna Saad, 72; Chenna Betitra, 3, daughter of Lahlou.

In Mahfouda village, on April 14, 1959 was the Chafa Tamellalt Massacre by the French colonial army on resistance fighters in a cave. Witness to the massacre, Rachid Challal describes the massacre as "The occupying army, keeping shepherd dogs on a leash, besieged Tighremt early in the morning and brought out all its inhabitants to gather them at the village cemetery. To flush out Mouloud Ahaddad N'Tmokra, Belkacem Irbah N'Vicher and all those who were hiding, the French soldiers destroyed everything in their path. All the Ichvouyla of olive oil and all the Ikoufen of wheat, products of all our harvests, were broken. To annihilate those who had taken refuge there, the enemy had initially bombarded the cave with a mortar placed on the other side of the Boussellam wadi before dynamiting the hole. The assault being very risky, knowing that the cave is located in a cliff that is difficult to access, the colonial army had no other solution than to inject asphyxiating gases into the cave using a helicopter sent as reinforcements"

The village roads were paved in August 2023.

There are 8 mosques in Bouhamza village: Mosquée Sidi Brahem Oubarkane (مسجد سيدي إبراهيم أوبركان), built in the 10th Century; Mosquée Sidi Brahim (مسجد سيدي إبراهيم بوحامزة); Mosquée Taourirt (مسجد تاوريرت), said to have been built in 1900; Mosquée des Martyrs (مسجد الشهداء) on the W35; Mosquée El Khendek (مسجد الخندق) on the W35; Mosquée Minaret (مسجد المئذنة), and Mosquée de Iqmunen (مسجد إقمونن). There is a village cemetery called Cimetière des Martyrs. There is a library in the North end of the village called Bibliothèque Communale de Bouhamza (المكتبة البلدية بوحامزة). There is also a post office on the W35 in the town centre. There is a bus station next to the village hall, adjacent to the village cemetery, and opposite the hospital. In the Southeast of the town is the Stade de Bouhamza and the secondary school (built, 2024).

== Geography ==
The Bouhamza commune is made up of multiple villages; Bouhamza, Tachouaft, Tansaout, Ifirakh, Mahfouda (Imahfoudhen), Ibouzithen, Toudert, Bouhitem, Takhlidjt Ichachoaen (Chachoua), Tasfart, Tizi Wezrou, Talghoumt, Tala Abdellah, Takhlicht Icha Chouane, Taouint u Meḥaoud, At Brahem, Lekhendek, Tighilet, Ichaachouaen, Assahel, Boumessaoud, Ifigha, Idjedaren, Tighilt, Tighilt n'Trahi, Taxliǧt Icaɛbanen, Tagma, Thala-Oumehaoued, and Sidi Yahia.

== Economy ==
The economy of Bouhamza is largely agricultural, as the commune produces olive and fig trees, olive oil, organic figs, and prickly pears, however tourism also exists, mainly to the Gueldaman caves and Sidi Yahia springs.

== Politics ==
List of Mayors:

- Mohamed Kheyar (2007-2012)
- Abdelhamid Bensikhaled (2012-2017)
- Salem Bensikhaled (2017-2021)
- Hamlat Yacine (2021-)
