= Souk-Oufella =

Coordinates: 36°36′22″N 4°38′20″E

Souk-Oufella Ssuq Ufella (Kabyle)

- Location within Algeria
- Country: Algeria
- Province: Béjaïa
- Time zone: UTC+1 (West Africa Time)

Souk-Oufella (Kabyle: Ssuq Ufella) is a commune of northern Algeria located in the Béjaïa Province, in Kabylia.
