= El-Flaye =

Coordinates: 36°36′08″N 4°39′49″E

El-Flaye Leflay (Kabyle)

- Location within Algeria
- Country: Algeria
- Province: Bejaia
- Time zone: UTC+1 (West Africa Time)

El-Flaye (Kabyle: Leflay) is a commune in northern Algeria in the Béjaïa Province. It is located in the Wilaya of Béjaïa and is administratively attached to the daïra of Sidi-Aich.

== Geography ==
El-Flaye is 50 km south-east of Béjaïa.

neighboring municipalities of El-Flaye are:

Tibane, Tinabdher, Sidi-Aich

Souk Oufella, Sidi Ayad

Seddouk, M'cisna.

=== Transport ===
The municipality of El-Flaye has five municipal buses reserved for school transport.Several buses run the El-Flaye - Sidi-Aich route.And three other buses transport the students to the villages of Ait Daoud, Izghad and El Madi.

Public transport users take independent private minibuses.

=== localities and neighborhoods ===
In addition to its capital El-Flaye, the municipality of El-Flaye is made up of the following localities:

El-Flaye, Ait Daoud, Izghad, El Madi et Maakal.

== Administration and politics ==
Period		Name	Party
1989	1993	Mekhlouf Alam	FLN
1993	1997	Lounis Hadidi	RCD
1997	2002	Lounis Hadidi	RCD
2002	2005	Morad Slawty	
2005	2007	Hafid Cherfi	FFS
2007	2012	Hafid Cherfi	FFS
2012	2017	Idir Aggad	RCD

== Economy ==
There are many shops dans la commune, and theirs number is increasing.

== Everyday life ==
- Seat of El-Flaye People's Municipal Assembly;
- Poste office;
- Youth center;
- Girls primary school( now mixed);
- Boys primary school (now mixed);
- Primary school Izghad;
- Primary school Ikherban:
- Primary school Ait Daoud;
- Secondary school Imadali Laarbi;
- Policlinic Vouhouri;
- Traitment room Tiserfine;
- Former Algerian Muslim scoots Association;
- Ecological Association "Le Printemps éternel';
- Help for people with special needs Association "Les anges oubliés"

== Personlities ==
- Amour Abdenour, born in El-Flaye on February 17, 1952, He is Kabyle Singer.
- Marcel Mouloudji, he is a singer, songwriter, painter and actor.
- Karim Tahar, he is a singer and boxer nicknamed The Kabyle Toni Rossi .
