= Sidi Aïch =

Coordinates: 36°36′47″N 4°41′18″E

Sidi Aïch Sidi Ɛic (Kabyle)
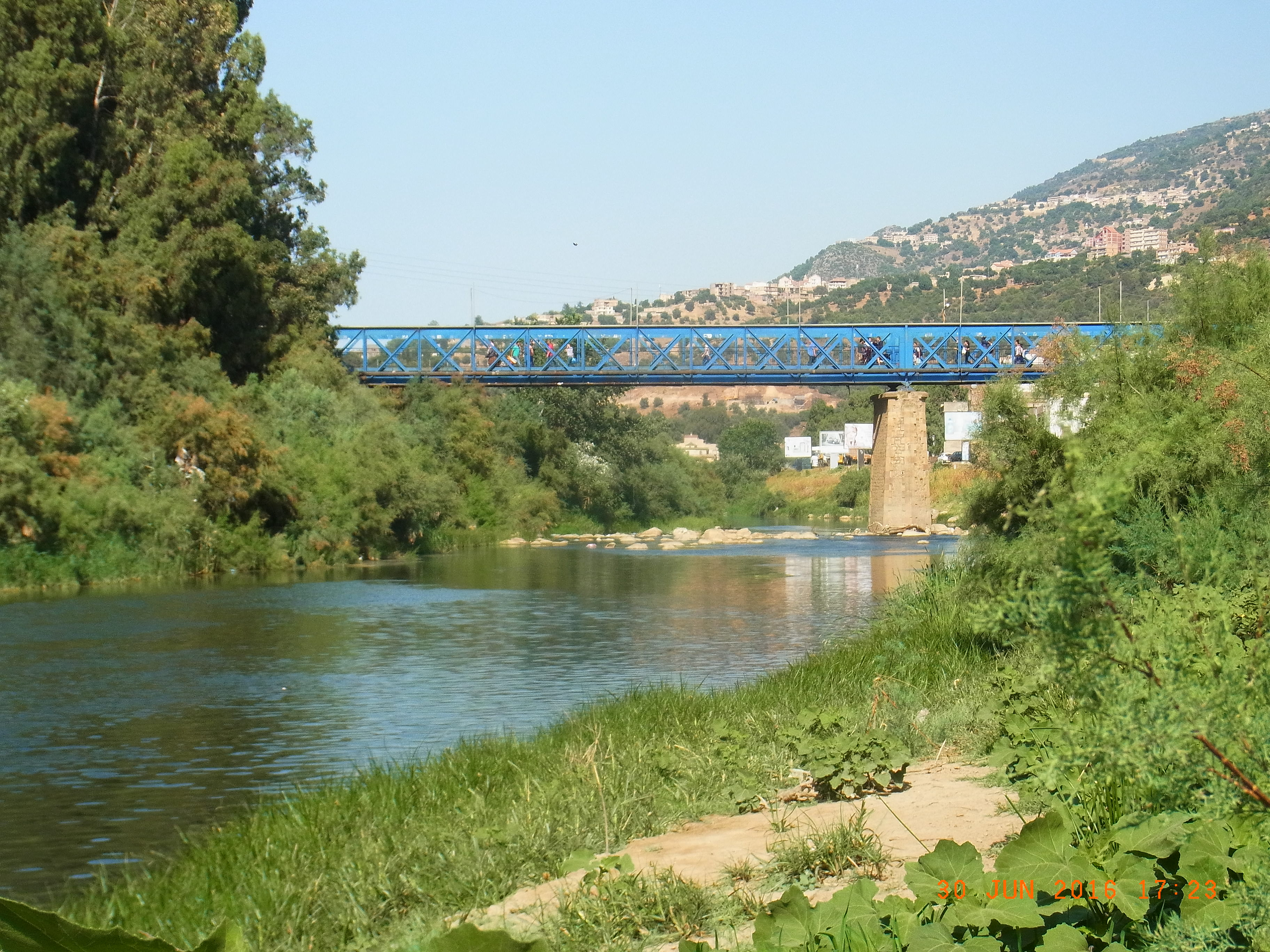
- Interactive map of Sidi Aïch
- Country: Algeria
- Province: Béjaïa
- Time zone: UTC+1 (West Africa Time)

Sidi Aïch (Kabyle: Sidi Ɛic) is a town in northern Algeria in the Soummam River valley. The Béni Mansour–Bejaïa railway traverses this community.
