= Tinabdher =

Coordinates: 36°37′31″N 4°40′52″E

Tinabdher Tinebder (Kabyle)
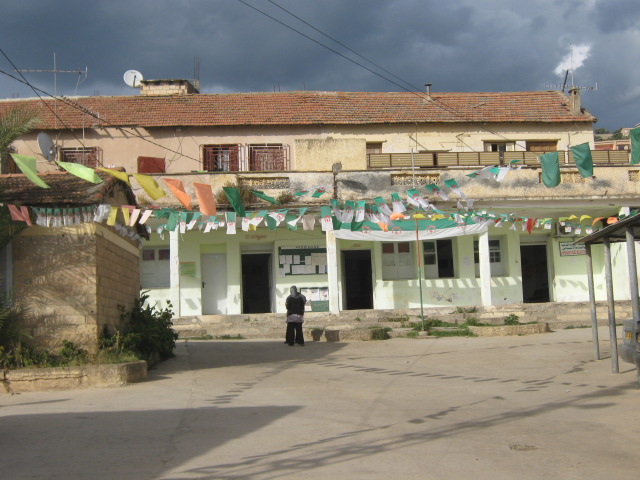

- Location within Algeria
- Country: Algeria
- Province: Béjaïa
- Time zone: UTC+1 (West Africa Time)

Tinabdher (Kabyle: Tinebder) is a commune of northern Algeria located in the Béjaïa Province, in Kabylia.
