= Bou Sellam River =

Watercourse in Algeria

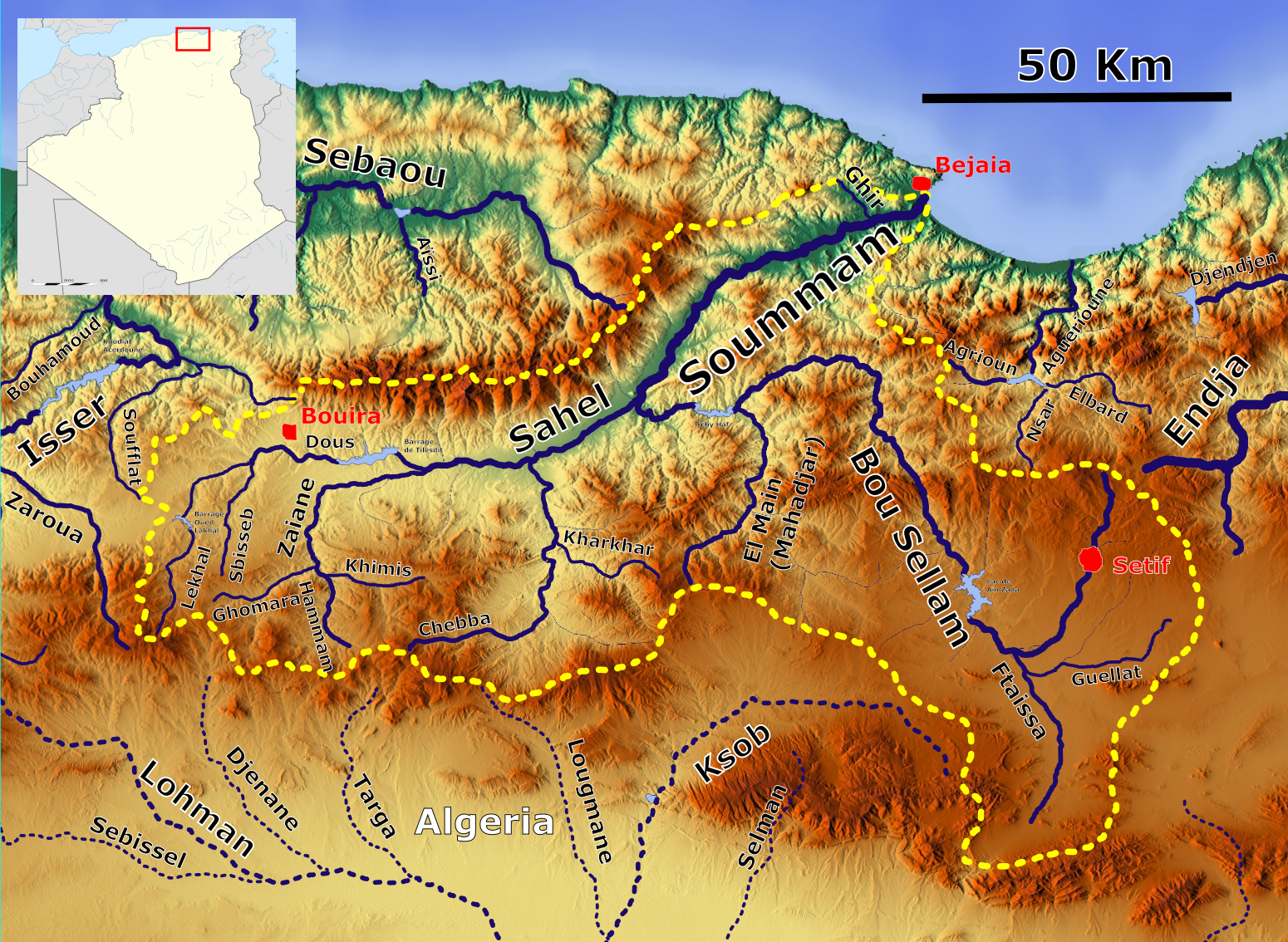
The Soummam River basin with the Bou Sellam (right)

The Bou Sellam River is a river of the Maghreb region in Algeria, in Bordj Bou Arréridj Province. The river flows through the Bou Sellam Valley, and is obstructed by the Ain Zada Dam.

== Description ==
The basin of Bou Sellam is closed to the north, from the confluence of the river with the Oued Sahel, by Mount Gueldamane. Wadi Bou Sellam descends from the southern slopes of Mount Megris; It is formed of five streams, Wadi Mahouan, Wadi Mohammed el Hannach, oued Ouricia, Wadi Goussimet and Wadi Fermatou, which meet north of Setif. The river then takes the name Oued Bou Sellam; It runs first south-south-west, passes three kilometers west of Setif, and crosses the chain in which it takes its source between djebel Tafat and Guergour.

The Oued Bou Sellam receives the wadi Malah, taking its source to Aïn Arnat in the dam Aïn Zada. After crossing the Aïn Zada dam, it crosses the Khelil commune by the east and receives two new tributaries, Wadi Khelil, which flows from the left bank in Besbassa halfway between El Kherba and the Aïn Zada dam and the wadi Taissa shortly before on the right bank.

Throughout this part of the course, the Bou Sellam watered the rich plain of Ameur, Ouled Mosli and Gherazla. From the Guergour gorges, on the contrary, it flows in a very rugged country, arrives at the foot of the Guifsar, it turns abruptly to the west and flows into the wadi Sahel opposite the peak of Akbou.

== Environment ==
The Oued Bou Sellam River contains 36% of the fish species of Algerian inland waters (15 species).
