= Soummam River =

Soummam
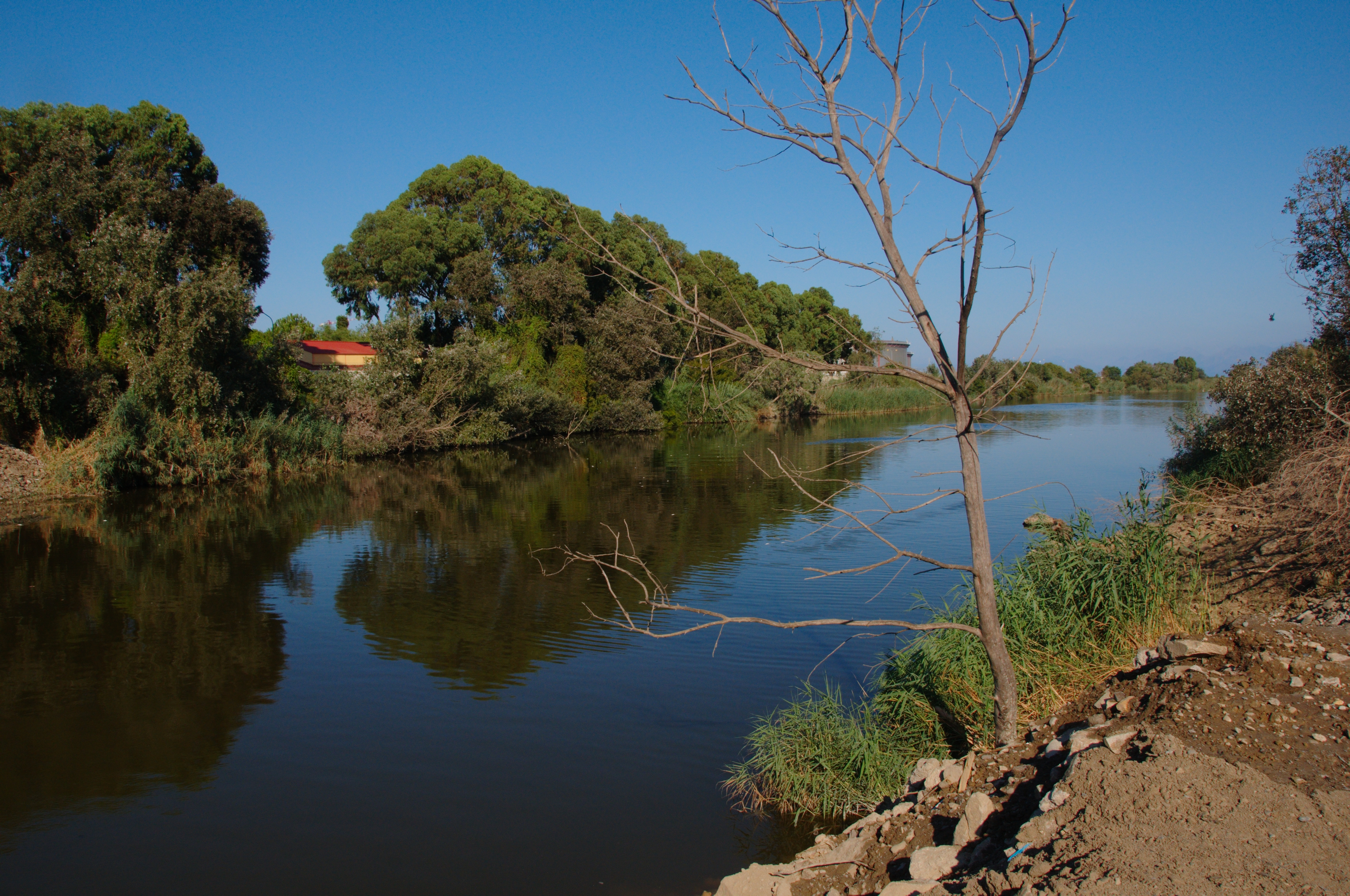

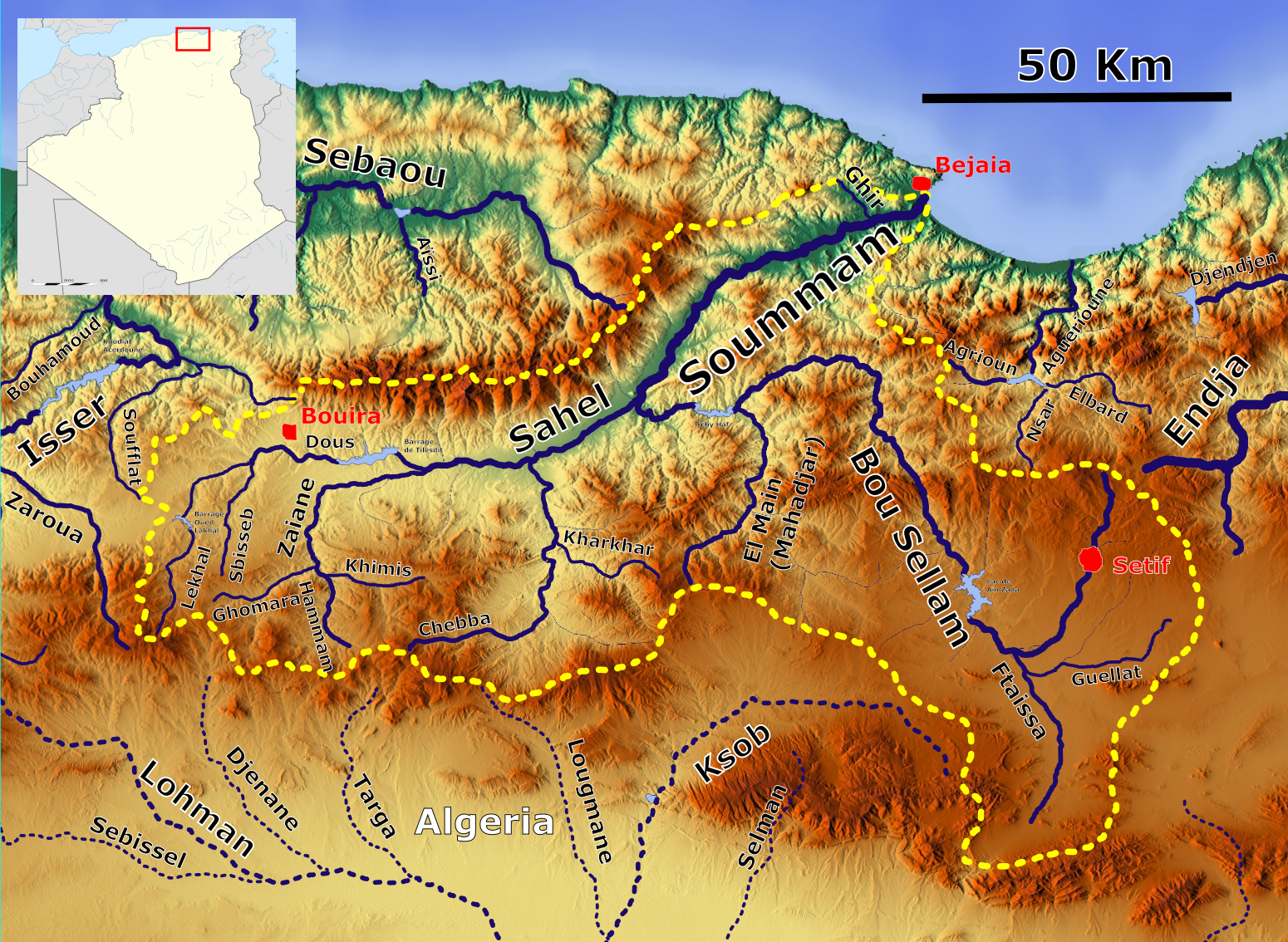

Location
- Country: Algeria
- Province: Béjaïa
- City: Akbou

Physical characteristics
- Source
  - location: Akbou, Algeria
- Mouth: Mediterranean
  - location: Béjaïa
  - coordinates: 36°43′46″N 5°04′35″E
- Length: 65 km (40 mi)

Basin features
- Protection status

Ramsar Wetland
- Official name: Vallée de l'oued Soummam
- Designated: 18 December 2009
- Reference no.: 1898

The Soummam River is a river in northern Algeria, born from the confluence of the Sahel River and the Bou Sellam River near Akbou and flowing into the Mediterranean at Béjaïa.

== Description ==
The waters that reach the sea in this place have for their origins the Mounts of Ain Oulmane, south of Sétif, Mount Dirah, south of Bouïra, and the extreme west of Djurdjura. It is in fact that the physical geography of the region places the southernmost sources of the Soummam at the limits of the semi-arid zone characterized by rigors linked to the continental climate, whereas the closest sources are located in the territories Humid to temperate climate. The Soummam constitutes a dense and well-supplied hydrographic network, particularly in its part situated in the Tellian Atlas: Djurdjura, Babors and Bibans. Its watershed covers an area of 9,200 km^{2} spread over four wilayas: Bouïra, Bordj Bou Arréridj, Sétif and Béjaïa. With the Cheliff, the Tafna and the Rhummel, the Soummam is one of the largest rivers of Algeria.

Oued Soummam drains a catchment area of 9,200 km^{2} divided as follows:

- Basin of Oued Sahel River from Sour El-Ghozlane (wilaya of Bouïra) to Akbou: 3,750 km^{2};
- Basin of Oued Bou Sellam River from north of Sétif to Akbou: 4,500 km^{2};
- Basin of the Soummam, is strictly speaking, only from Akbou to the sea: 950 km^{2}.

== River valley ==
The Soummam valley is named after the river which crosses it. It is located in Kabylia, a region of northern Algeria, occupying a wide corridor in the wilaya of Béjaïa. The Béni Mansour–Bejaïa railway is a regional railway that closely follows this river valley and connects to the national rail network in the municipality of Boudjellil.

Between the Akfadou-Gouraya set in the north, the Biban chain (the historic territory of the Ait Abbas) in the south-east and the Sahel-Djurdjura valley (Tazmalt commune) in the south-west. The Soummam valley, which extends from Akbou to Béjaia, appears as a narrow winding corridor 65 km long (inside the wilaya of Béjaïa) over a maximum width of 4 km at El Kseur.

The slopes particularly to the south, are relatively mild slopes and therefore very developed. This area is broken down into small pedological units: the flysch prevails in Akbou, the sandstone is predominant in El Kseur.

The municipalities of Amizour, El Kseur, Ouzellaguen and Timezrit have vast areas suitable for rich crops such as market gardening and fruit growing.

== Hydrology ==
The Soummam valley is drained by a dense hydrographic network, composed of numerous permanent and intermittent rivers, of which the Oued Soummam represents the main collector. According to the hydrological data collected between 1961 and 1976, the average flow of the Soummam is 25 m^{3} / s. During the 1970 flood period, the maximum recorded flow was 115.9 m^{3} / s and the low flow (during the months of July and August) dropped to 0.6 m^{3} / s. Indeed, these flows show great irregularities inter-annual, and therefore seasonal.

At its mouth, the Soummam has a contribution of 700,106 m^{3} / year of water which it diversifies in the Mediterranean Sea (Visiterv, 1987). The main input comes from the tributaries of the left bank, with an average total of 68.106 m^{3} / year, and the tributaries of the right bank discharge an average of 25 × 106 m^{3} / year. The tributaries of the left bank are located on slopes that are more watered in rain and snow, enabling them to channel a greater surface flow than the slopes drained by the tributaries of the right bank.

== Name ==
The word Soummam is a distortion of the word kabyle "assemmam", which means "acid". Pliny the Elder had cited the Soummam as being called "Nasava" by Ptolemy.
