= Seddouk District =

Coordinates: 36°30′44″N 4°42′32″E

Seddouk District Tadayra n Ṣedduq
- District
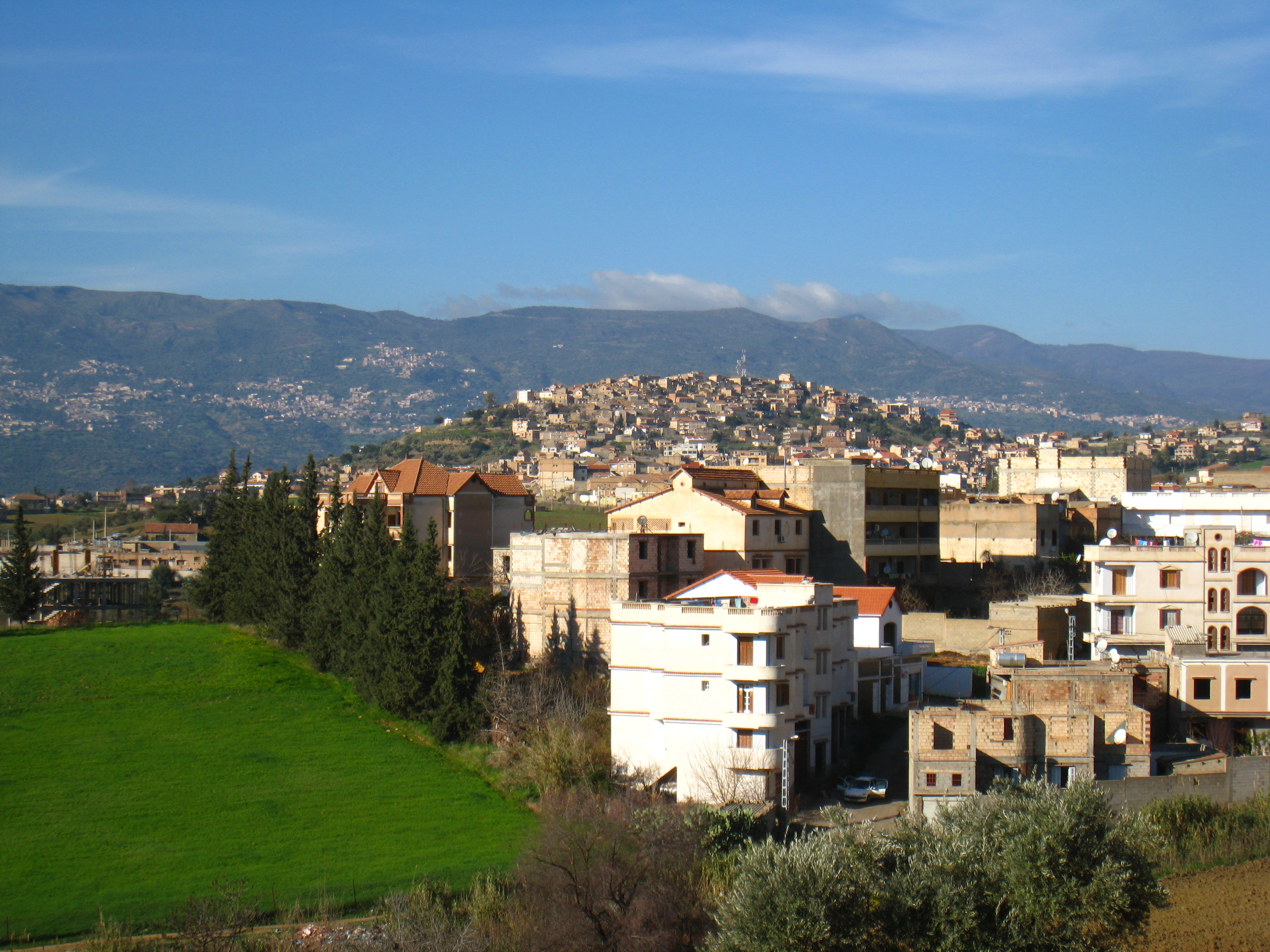

- Country: Algeria
- Province: Béjaïa Province

Area
  - Total: 8,825 sq mi (22,857 km^{2})
- Time zone: UTC+1 (CET)

Seddouk District (Kabyle: Tadayra n Ṣedduq) is a district of Béjaïa Province, Algeria.

== Municipalities ==
The district is further divided into 4 municipalities:

- Seddouk
- Amalou
- Mecisna
- Bouhamza
