= Pic des Singes =

Peak in northern Algeria

Coordinates: 36.769383°N 5.095639°E

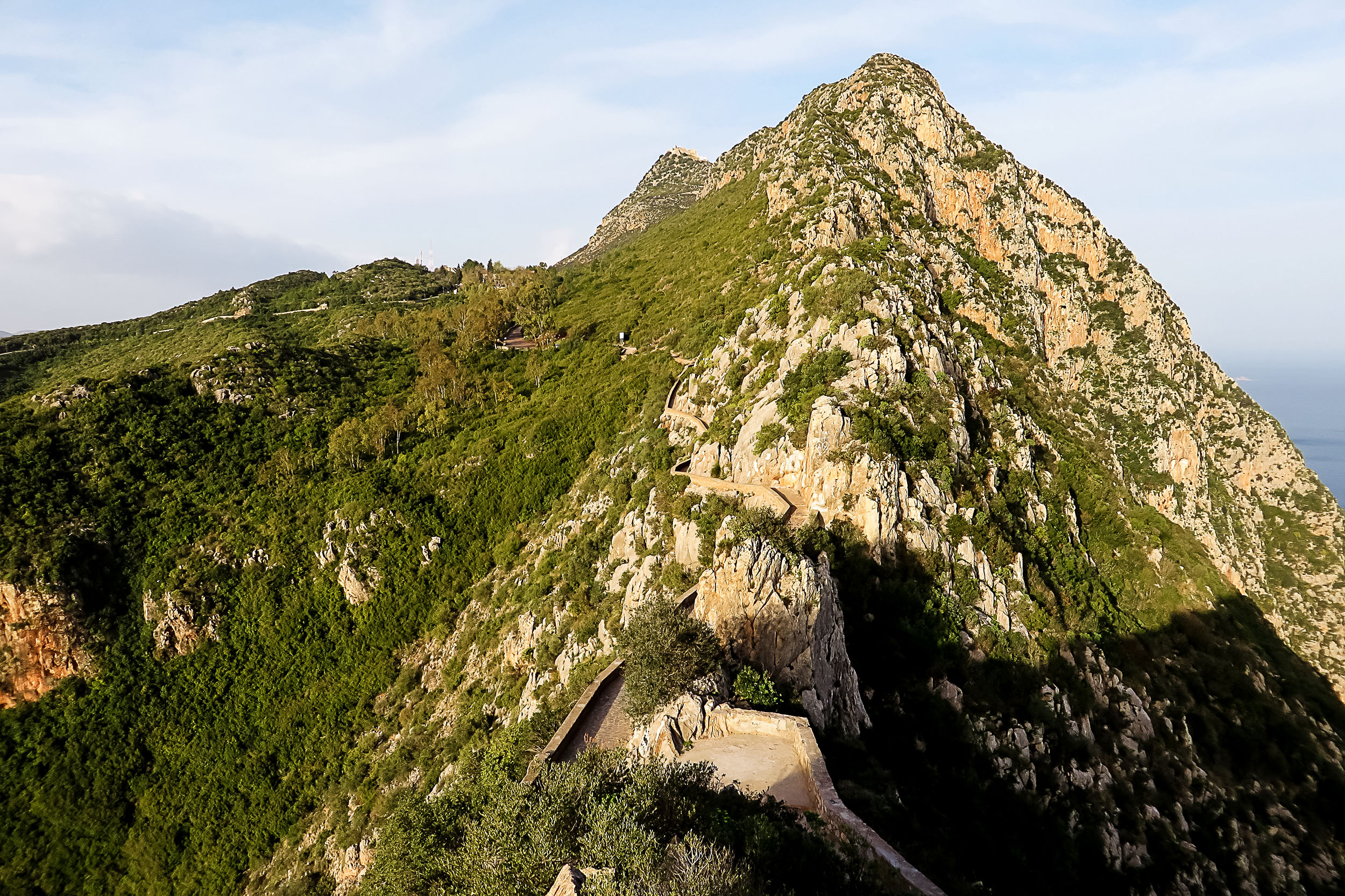
Monkeys Peak

Pic des Singes (or Monkeys Peak) is a peak in northern Algeria, northwest of the town of Béjaïa. It is located in the Cap Carbon area of the Tell Atlas range, on the Mediterranean coast.

== Ecology ==
This mountain is a habitat for the endangered primate Barbary macaque. Macaca sylvanus. This primate species is the only surviving species in Africa of its genus. Barbary macaques prehistorically had a much wider distribution than at present.
