= Zaki Hannache =

Algerian human rights activist (born 1987)

Zakaria "Zaki" Hannache (Arabic: زكي حنّاش; born 1987) is an Algerian human rights activist who rose to prominence in 2019 due to his documentation of human rights abuses by the Algerian government against members of the Hirak movement. In 2022, after being charged with multiple offences including undermining state security, Hannache sought asylum in Tunisia, before settling in Canada in 2023, where he continues his activism in exile.

== Personal life ==
Hannache was born in Béjaïa, Béjaïa Province, Algeria, into an Amazigh family. Prior to the Hirak movement, he was an industrial technician working for the state-owned electricity and natural gas company Sonelgaz and living in Algiers. Hannache described himself as this time as being "apolitical" and focused on getting married and moving abroad.

== Activism ==
On 16 February 2019, a peaceful march was organised in Algiers to protest the then-President of Algeria, Abdelaziz Bouteflika's recent announcement of his plan to run for a fifth presidential term. Subsequent protests across the country led to Bouteflika announcing his immediate resignation on 2 April 2019; the protests continued to occur, primarily on Fridays, with protestors calling for a complete overhaul of Algeria's political system.

Hannache had not taken part in the initial marches, but subsequently joined an ad hoc monitoring group that collected, verified, and documented information pertaining to the arrests of people taking part in the Hirak protests. Utilising Facebook and online messaging, Hannache also publicly advocated for the rights and releases of detained activists, and became a trusted source for their families and lawyers, often disseminating information to international groups and organisations including the United Nations.

== Arrest and trial ==
On 15 February 2022, Hannache gave an interview with Jeune Afrique in which he disputed Bouteflika's successor, Abdelmadjid Tebboune's claim that there were no prisoners of conscience in Algeria, presenting his own research that had identified 340 such prisoners in the country as of 9 February. Three days later, on 18 February, Hannache was arrested by plainclothes police officers at his home in Cherarba, Algiers. Hannache was placed into police custody, while warrants were obtained to search his home and seize his phone.

Between 18 February and 24 February, Hannache was interviewed by the police without having legal representation. On 24 February, Hannache appeared before an investigative judge at the Sidi M'Hamed Court in Algiers, where he was charged with "disseminating false information", "praising terrorism", "receiving funds from an institution inside or outside of the country", and "undermining state security"; Hannache was placed into pre-trial detention. Evidence used against Hannache included his reporting on hunger strikes by imprisoned activists, which the government stated was false; an online interview an exiled YouTuber, Amir DZ, who had been described as a terrorist by the government; and prize money he had received as part of a human rights award he was given in 2021.

Hannache's arrest occurred at the same time as the arrest of another prominent activist, Faleh Hammoudi from the Tlemcen office of the Algerian League for the Defence of Human Rights, who had been arrested two days after Hannache, and who similarly had been taken into custody and had his home searched and phone seized. Within 24 hours of Hannache's arrest, a petition signed by 15 organisations and 130 Algerian personalities was released, calling for Hannache's immediate release. Mustapha Bouchachi, the former president of the Algerian League for the Defence of Human Rights, described Hannache as "an essential vehicle for documenting human rights violations".

On 31 March, Hannache was provisionally released from custody on bail. In March 2023, Hannache was convicted in absentia and was sentenced to three years imprisonment. The court subsequently issued an international arrest warrant for his immediate arrest.

== Exile ==
In August 2022, Hannache left Algeria for Tunisia on medical grounds, that had been granted. During his time in Tunisia, Hannache continued to report on human rights abuses in Algeria, including the arrests of journalists and activists and the closures of human rights organisations, while living in hiding in Tunis, moving an estimated 11 times to avoid detection from Algerian authorities. Hannache expressed his concern about his safety in Tunisia, citing the case of Slimane Bouhafs, a fellow Algerian activist with refugee status in Tunisia who had disappeared in 2021, before surfacing in 2022 in custody in Algeria following a case of refoulement by Tunisian authorities. Hannache reported that on at least two occasions, Algerian police officers had been searching for him in Tunis.

On 9 November, he received summons for a court hearing at the Sidi M'Hamed Court on 13 November; the following day, Hannache applied for asylum, with the UN Refugee Agency formally recognising him as a refugee. A joint statement by 55 human rights organisations, including the Algerian League for the Defence of Human Rights, Amnesty International, Front Line Defenders, and the Tunisian Human Rights League, called on the Tunisian government to protect Hannache's right to safety, stating that his forced return to Algeria would set a "dangerous precedent" for human rights. At the same time, the UN Special Rapporteur on Human Rights Defenders expressed their "serious concerns" for Hannache's charges, stating they appeared to be linked to his human rights activism.

On 19 December 2023, Hannache moved to Canada, which had agreed to resettle him.

== Recognition ==
In December 2021, Hannache was awarded the Ali Boudoukha Prize for his work documenting human rights abuses against Hirak activists.
