= Ilougane =

Village in Algeria

Coordinates: 36°15′32.5″N 4°35′4.7″E

Ilougane is a small village located in the outskirts of Béjaïa and its neighbouring Bordj Bou Arréridj in Algeria. The village is currently deserted as its most inhabitants left for better living conditions in neighbouring cities in late 1970s, mostly to Bordj Bou Arreridj. The remainder were forced to flee after clashes in the area in 1997 during the Algerian Civil War.
