= Béjaïa =

Béjaïa: Vgayet, ⴱⴳⴰⵢⴻⵜ (Kabyle); بجاية (Arabic)
- City and commune
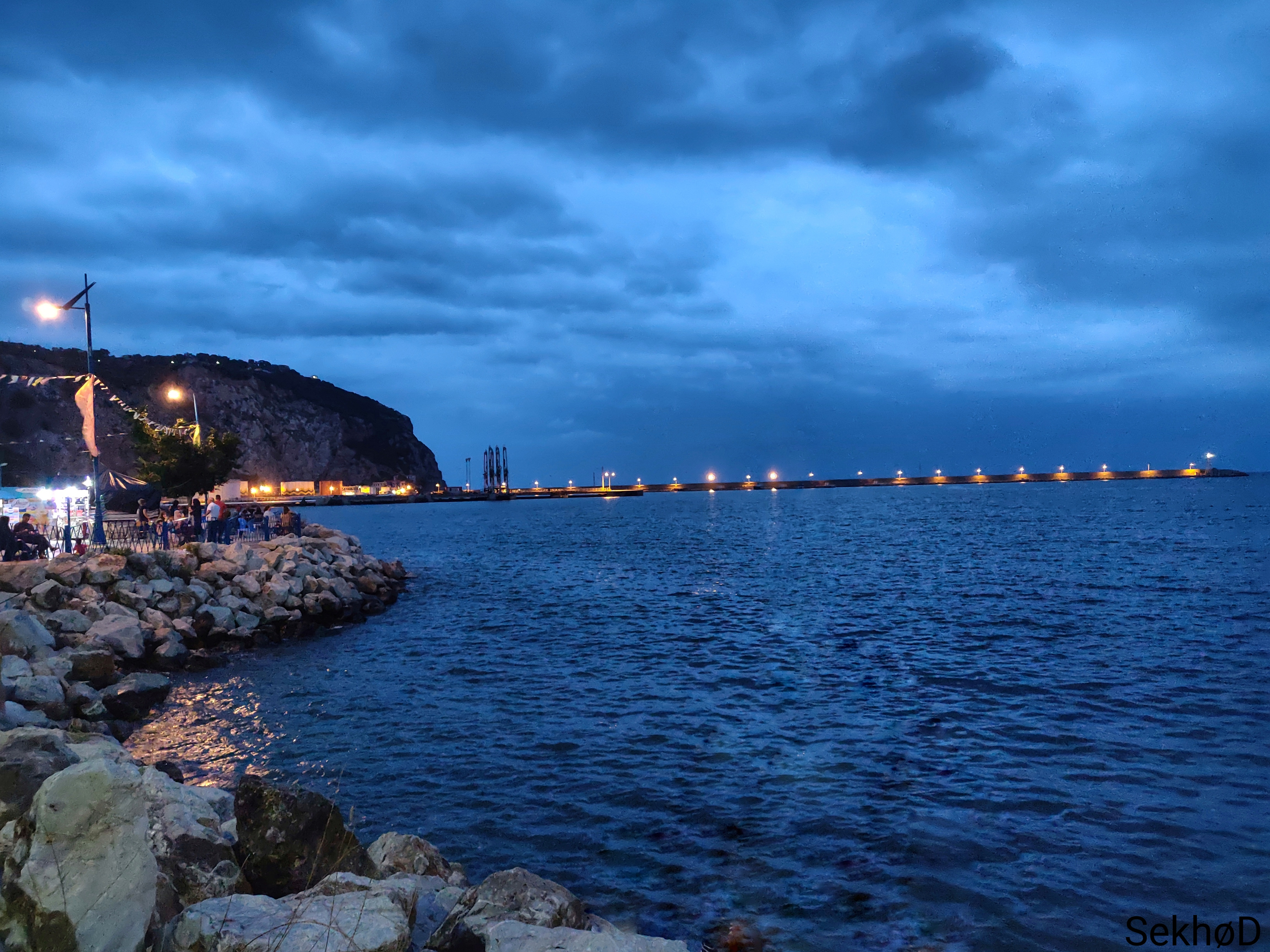
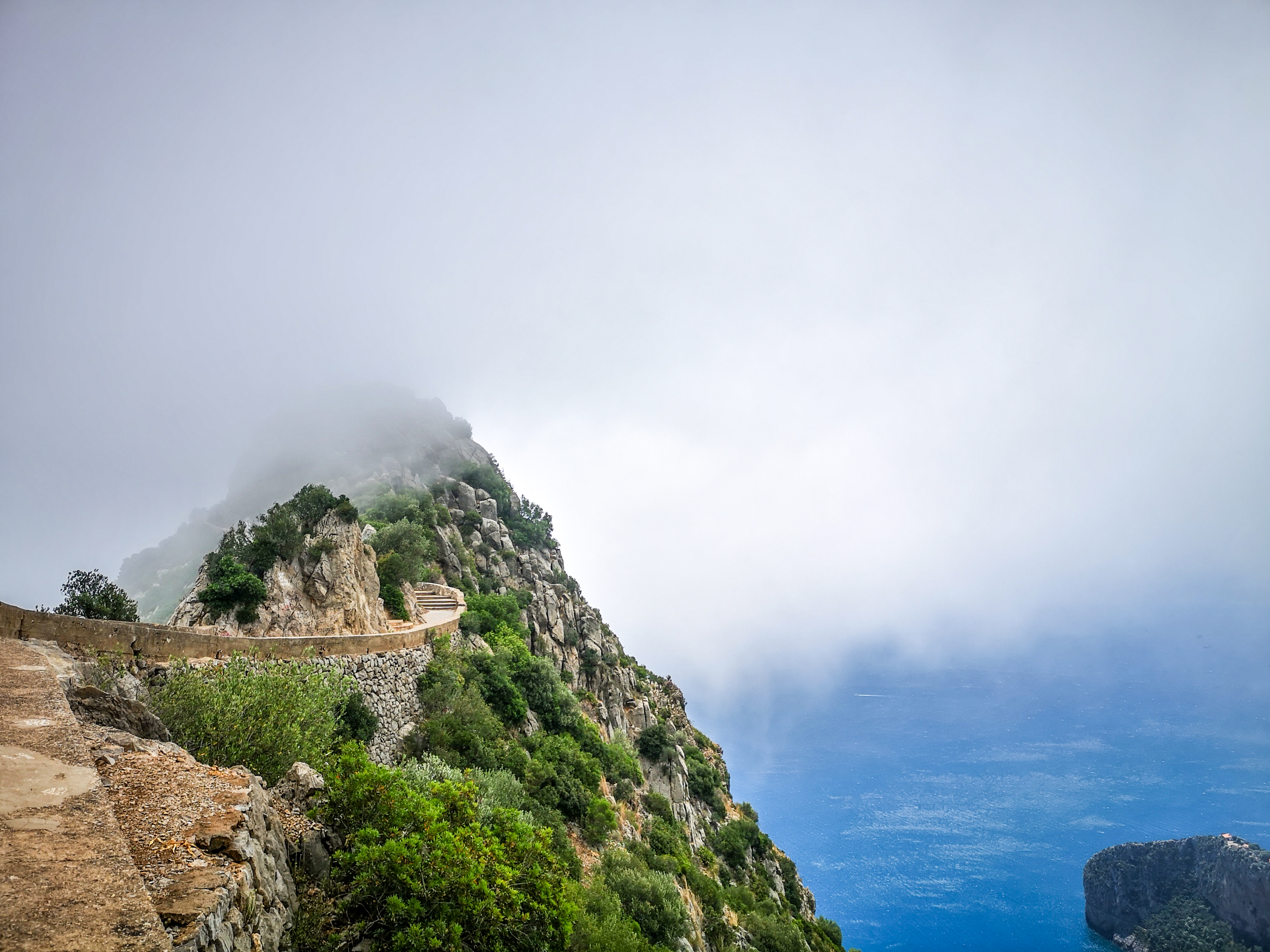
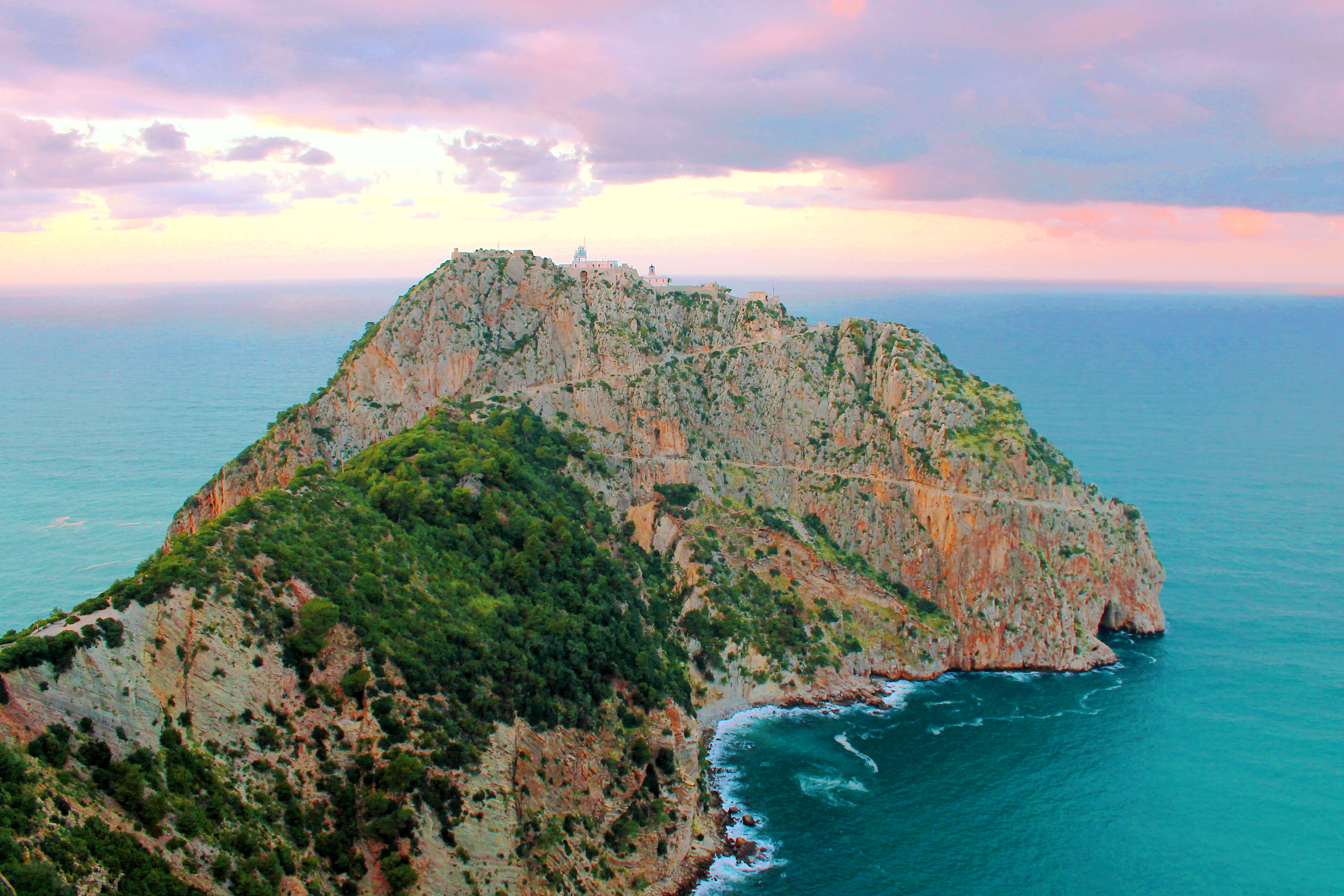
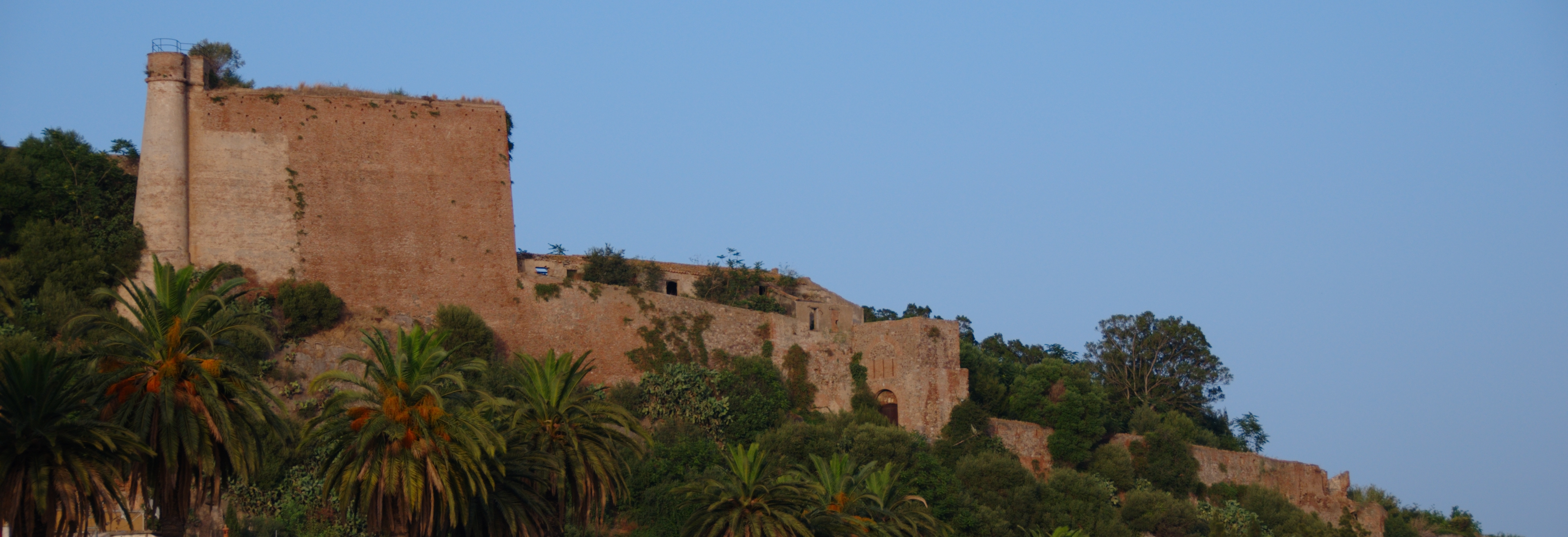
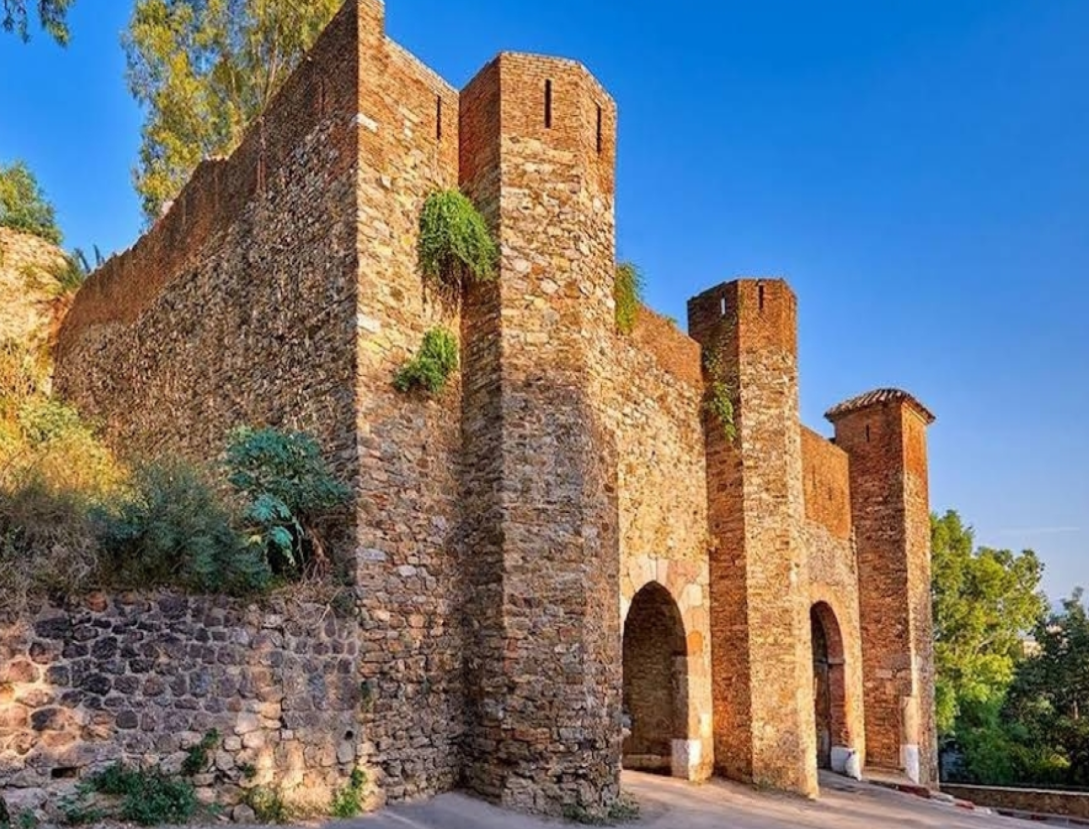
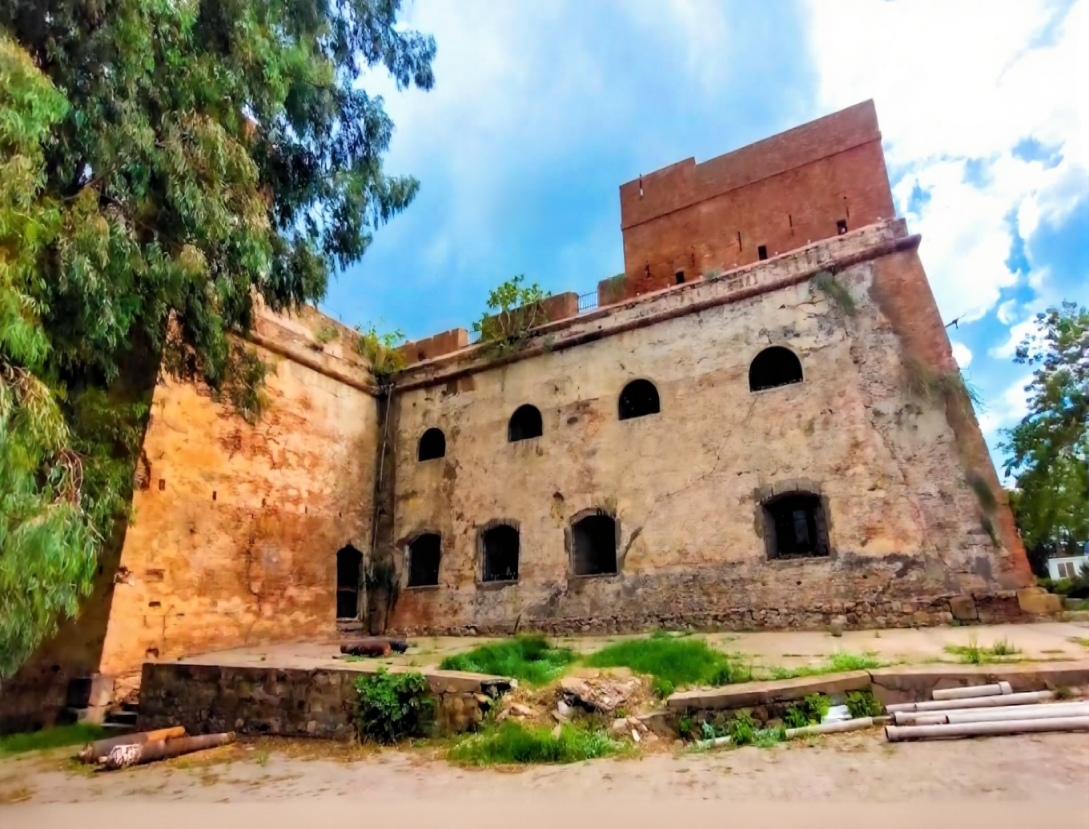
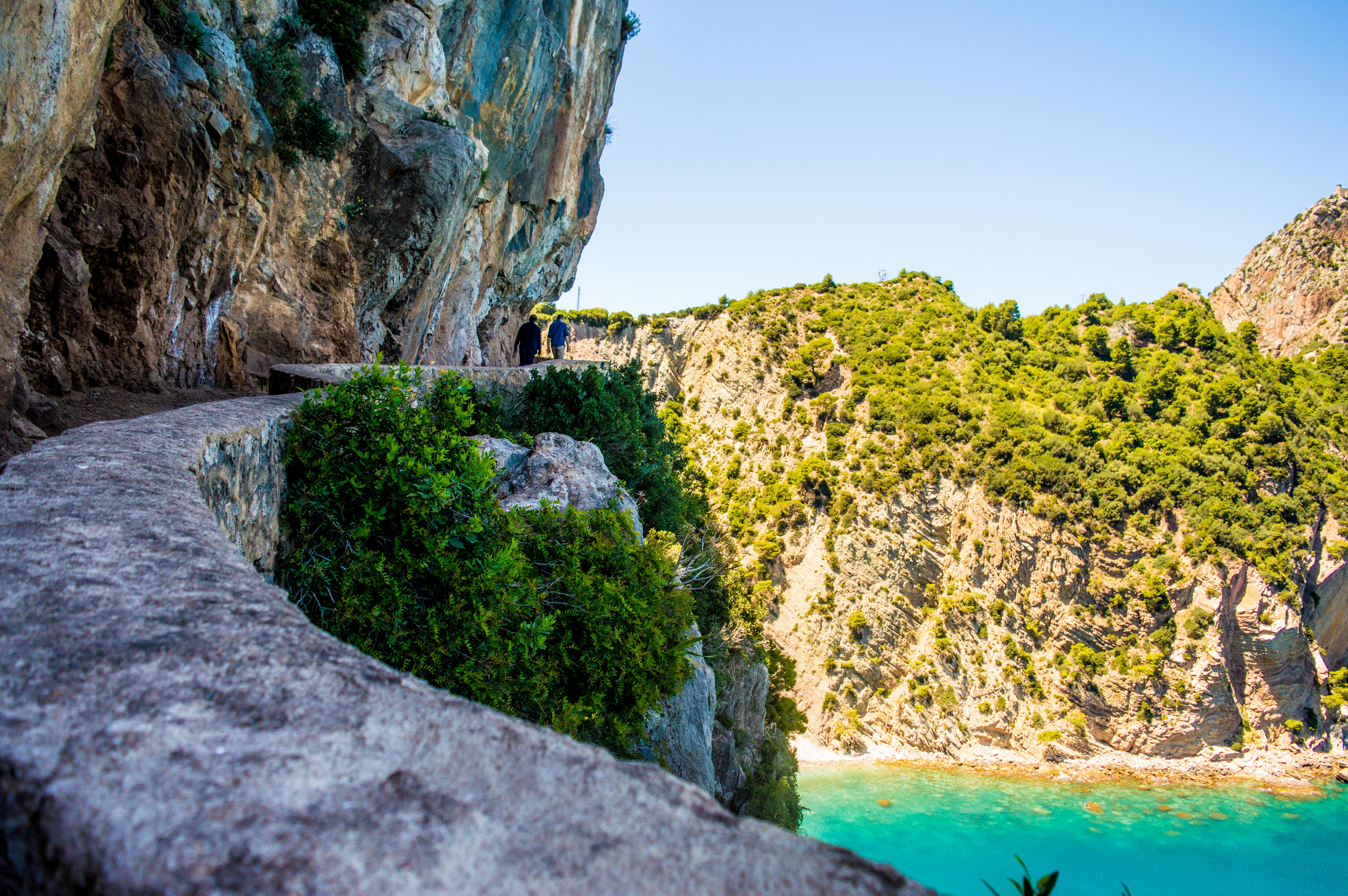
- Brise de Mer Pic des Singes Cap Carbon Casbah of Béjaïa Bab El Fouka Bordj Moussa Gouraya National Park

- Flag

- Location of Béjaïa within Béjaïa Province

- Location in Algeria
- Coordinates: 36°45′04″N 05°03′51″E
- Country: Algeria
- Province: Béjaïa Province
- District: Béjaïa District

Area
  - Total: 120.22 km^{2} (46.42 sq mi)

Population (2008 census)
  - Total: 177,988
  - Density: 1,480.5/km^{2} (3,834.5/sq mi)
- Time zone: UTC+1 (CET)
- Postal code: 06000
- Climate: Csa

Béjaïa (/bɪˈdʒaɪə/) is a Mediterranean port city and commune on the Gulf of Béjaïa in Algeria; it is the capital of Béjaïa Province.

== Geography ==
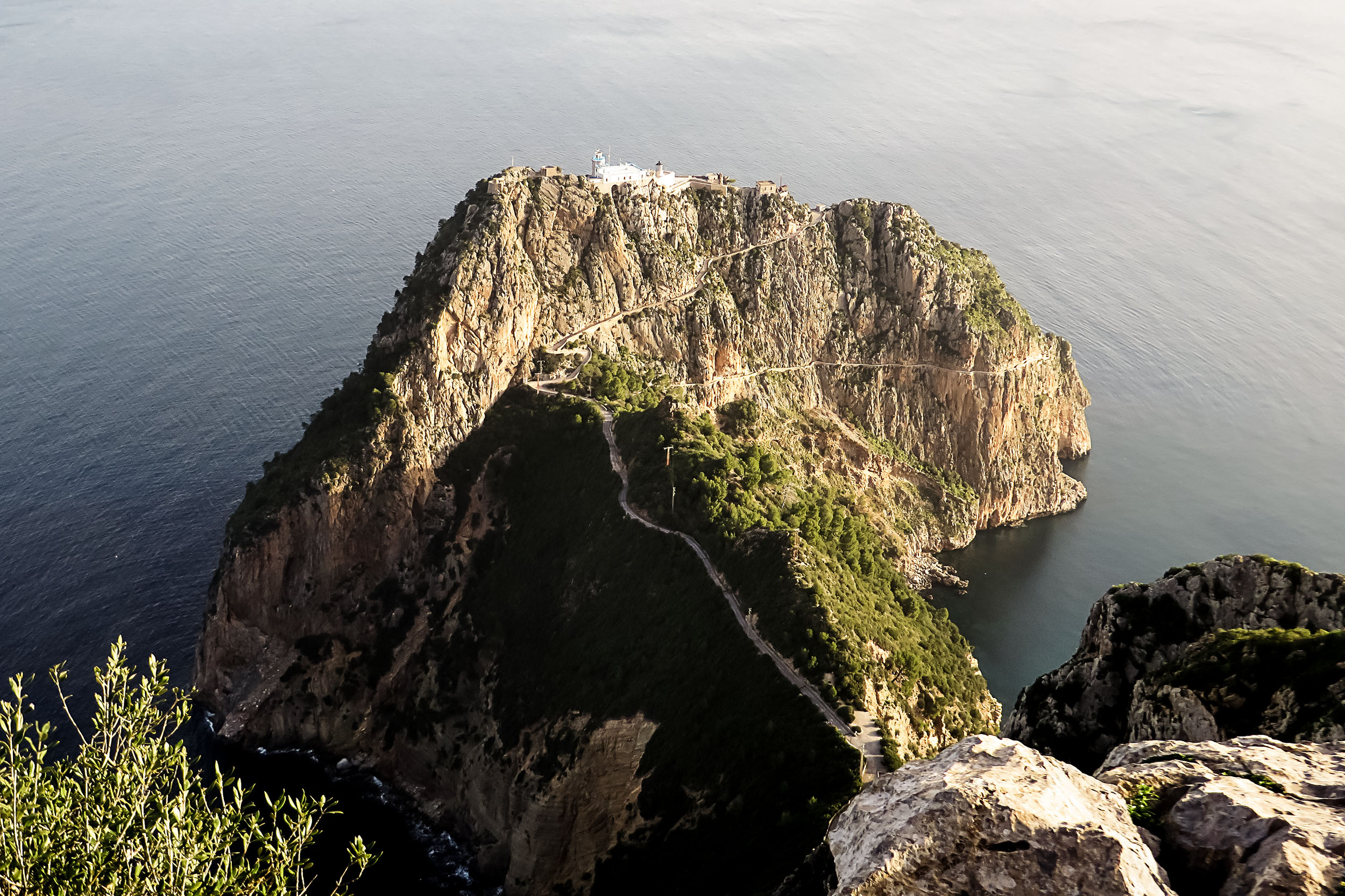
Monkey Peak (Pic des Singes)

=== Location ===
Béjaïa owes its existence to its port, which also makes it prosperous. It is located in a sickle-shaped bay protected from the swell of offshore winds (northwest facing) by the advance of Cape Carbon (to the west of the city). The city is backed by Mount Gouraya located in a northwest position. This port site, in one of the most beautiful bays of the Maghreb and Mediterranean coast, is dominated in the background by the Babors mountain range. Another advantage is that the city is the outlet of the Soummam valley, a geographical corridor facing southwest. However, since the time when the city was a capital, there has been a divorce between the city and the region (Kabylia) linked to the difficulty of securing a hinterland. On a macro-regional scale, the city has its back to the region: its position at the end of the Soummam places it at the interface between Grande and Petite Kabylie. But these two groups are closed in on themselves and seek inland capitals (Tizi Ouzou, Akbou, Kherrata, etc.) by turning away from the coast. The city has, in a way, weak local roots; the rural proximity of the city is limited to four or five communes. On a micro-regional scale, Béjaïa is the outlet of a central Algeria, going from Algiers to Skikda, the spillway of the Highlands and a supply port for two million people. But the connection is complex: to the south-east, trade with Sétif is only possible through the steep gorges of Kherrata; another route takes the Soummam, then to the east the Iron Gates and the climb towards Bordj Bou Arreridj, it is this route that is taken by the national road and the railway. These topographical constraints mean that, despite its strong dynamism, the city sees part of the trade escape it in its eastern and western areas of influence.

The town is overlooked by the mountain Yemma Gouraya. Other nearby scenic spots include the Aiguades beach and the Pic des Singes (Peak of the Monkeys); the latter site is a habitat for the endangered Barbary macaque, which prehistorically had a much broader distribution than at present. All three of these geographic features are located in the Gouraya National Park.

The urban area covers an area of 12,022 hectares. Béjaïa is located 220 km east of the capital Algiers, 93 km east of Tizi Ouzou, 81.5 km northeast of Bordj Bou Arreridj, 70 km northwest of Sétif and 61 km west of Jijel. (Note: Distances orthodromiques, dites aussi à vol d'oiseau) The geographic coordinates of the commune at the central point of its capital are 36° 45′ 00″ North and 5° 04′ 00″ East, respectively.

=== Toponymy ===
Béjaïa is transliteration from an Arabic toponym derived from the Berber toponym (Kabyle variant) Bgayet, notably by transliteration (see Transcription and transliteration) of the sound ǧ in dj (ج). This Berber name — which would have originally been Tabgayet, but whose initial t marking the feminine gender would have fallen into disuse — would come from the words tabegga, tabeɣayt, meaning "wild brambles and blackberries". In Tifinagh script, the name of the city is ⴱⴳⴰⵢⴻⵜ (Bgayet). ·

The name Béjaïa would thus originally have the same Berber root as other names of cities in the Maghreb, such as Dougga (Thouga) and Béja (Vaga) in Tunisia or Ksar Baghaï (Bagaï) in the Aurès.

In medieval Romance languages, Bugaya (from Arabic Bugāya; in Spanish Bujía and in Italian Bugía is the name given to the city, which supplied a large quantity of beeswax for the manufacture of candles. Bougie became the French form of this transcription of the Arabic name. Gradually it came to refer to the wax that was imported in the Middle Ages for the manufacture of candles in Europe; they are from then on commonly designated in French by the word "bougie". This in turn is carried over to the word Bugia, meaning a long-handled candlestick used by Catholic bishops and high-ranking priests.

=== Climate and hydrography ===
The city is part of the Soummam's drainage basin. Béjaïa and the lower Soummam Valley enjoy a Mediterranean climate. It is generally humid with a slight seasonal temperature change. Average temperatures are generally mild and vary from 11.1 °C in winter to 24.5 °C in summer.

In addition to the Soummam River, which sufficiently meets agricultural needs in the surroundings of the city, Béjaïa is located in the maritime Kabylie and benefits from a fairly favorable rainfall compared to the rest of the country. The rainfall in the region can range from 800 mm to 1,200 mm, but some local sources tend to be depleted due to increased demand. The city also draws its water resources from the mountainous hinterland and from various springs, such as that of Toudja, which was connected in ancient times by an aqueduct to the ancient city (Saldae).

Climate data for Béjaïa
Month	Jan	Feb	Mar	Apr	May	Jun	Jul	Aug	Sep	Oct	Nov	Dec	Year
Record high °C (°F)	27.7 (81.9)	32.0 (89.6)	37.2 (99.0)	35.4 (95.7)	42.7 (108.9)	42.8 (109.0)	44.8 (112.6)	47.6 (117.7)	42.5 (108.5)	40.0 (104.0)	37.4 (99.3)	33.0 (91.4)	47.6 (117.7)
Mean daily maximum °C (°F)	16.4 (61.5)	16.8 (62.2)	17.7 (63.9)	19.3 (66.7)	22.0 (71.6)	25.3 (77.5)	28.7 (83.7)	29.3 (84.7)	27.8 (82.0)	24.3 (75.7)	20.3 (68.5)	16.9 (62.4)	22.1 (71.7)
Daily mean °C (°F)	12.1 (53.8)	12.3 (54.1)	13.1 (55.6)	14.7 (58.5)	17.6 (63.7)	21.0 (69.8)	24.0 (75.2)	24.8 (76.6)	23.2 (73.8)	19.7 (67.5)	15.8 (60.4)	12.7 (54.9)	17.6 (63.7)
Mean daily minimum °C (°F)	7.7 (45.9)	7.6 (45.7)	8.5 (47.3)	10.1 (50.2)	13.1 (55.6)	16.6 (61.9)	19.3 (66.7)	20.2 (68.4)	18.5 (65.3)	15.0 (59.0)	11.2 (52.2)	8.4 (47.1)	13.0 (55.4)
Record low °C (°F)	−1.4 (29.5)	−4.0 (24.8)	−0.1 (31.8)	2.0 (35.6)	5.8 (42.4)	7.8 (46.0)	13.0 (55.4)	11.0 (51.8)	11.0 (51.8)	8.0 (46.4)	1.6 (34.9)	−2.4 (27.7)	−4.0 (24.8)
Average precipitation mm (inches)	115.9 (4.56)	94.0 (3.70)	80.6 (3.17)	64.4 (2.54)	41.3 (1.63)	13.6 (0.54)	6.1 (0.24)	12.1 (0.48)	55.9 (2.20)	70.0 (2.76)	99.3 (3.91)	117.8 (4.64)	771 (30.37)
Average precipitation days (≥ 1 mm)	9.8	9.3	7.9	7	5.2	2.2	0.8	2.1	5.4	6.6	8.5	9.2	74
Average relative humidity (%)	78.5	77.6	77.9	77.9	79.9	76.9	75.0	74.6	76.4	76.3	75.3	76.0	76.9
Mean monthly sunshine hours	164.7	168.4	206.4	227.5	269.7	308.3	331.5	304.6	233.6	213.7	167.5	—	—
Source 1: NOAA (precipitation-sun 1991-2020), (mean temperatures 1968-1990)
Source 2: climatebase.ru (extremes, humidity)

=== Roadside and rail communications ===
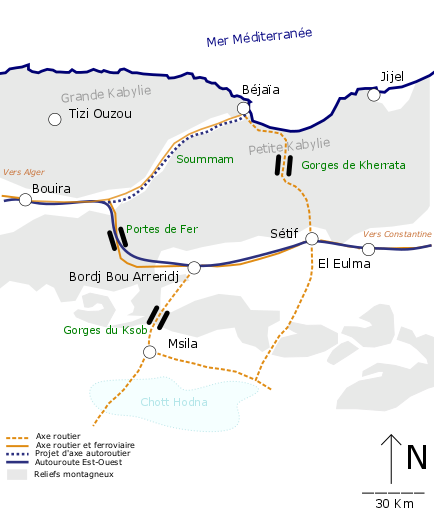
The relief of Béjaïa and its road and rail communication routes.

The city of Béjaïa is linked to Algiers, Tizi Ouzou, Bouira, Sétif, Jijel and several Kabyle localities by an important road network. It has a bus station. Bus lines connect it to the cities of the Algerian south, including Hassi Messaoud, Ouargla, Ghardaïa, Laghouat, Djelfa and Bou Saâda.

The commune of Béjaïa is served by several national roads. Some of them run through valleys and gorges that constitute natural passage areas: (Note: For major natural crossing points, see Cote 1991, pp. 4–5.) national road 9 (Sétif road), which passes along the coast then the Kherrata gorges to Sétif, and national road 24 (Béjaïa road), which crosses the Soummam valley, Bouira, then Algiers to the west, or Bordj Bou Arreridj to the east. Others run through steeper terrain: national road 12 (Tizi Ouzou road), passing through the Yakouren forest and its mountains then Azazga, Tizi-Ouzou to Boumerdès, and national road 75 (Batna road), passing through Barbacha and the mountains of Petite Kabylie to reach Sétif and join the Highlands to Batna. A highway construction project is underway to ease congestion on the Béjaïa road, the main axis between the capital and the east of the country, and to connect the city and its port, one of the most important in Algeria, to the Algerian East–west highway.

Béjaïa has a railway station, the terminus of the Beni Mansour-Bejaia line, created in 1889 and on which a railcar runs linking the stations in the region: Beni Mansour, Tazmalt, Allaghan, Akbou, Lazib Ben Cherif, Ighzer Amokrane, Takriets, Sidi Aich, Ilmaten and El Kseur, The interconnection, at Beni Mansour, with the Algiers–Skikda railway, allows access to the entire Algerian railway network by direct links to the Algerian capital, to the west, and to Sétif, to the south-east. A regional train specifically linking Béjaïa to its outskirts is also in service; it was designed to open up the east of the region. The line would benefit from about fifteen daily round trips and should serve the stations of the Beni Mansour-Bejaia line. Bejaia has an international airport located 5 km south of the city. It was first called "Bejaia - Soummam Airport" between 1982 and 1999, named after the Soummam River which flows into the Mediterranean near Bejaia. It was inaugurated in 1982 for domestic flights and in 1993 for international flights. It was renamed "Bejaia - Soummam - Abane Ramdane Airport" in 1999, in homage to the Algerian politician who played a key role in the history of the Algerian War of Independence.

== History ==
Timeline of Béjaïa
Historical affiliations

Numidia (202 BC-25 BC )
Mauretania (27 BC–44 AD)
Roman Empire (44–395)
Western Roman Empire (395–430s)
Vandal Kingdom (430s–534)
Byzantine Empire (534–674)
Umayyad Caliphate (674–685)
Byzantine Empire (685–698)
Umayyad Caliphate (698–700)
Jarawa (700–702)
Umayyad Caliphate (702–741)
Berbers (741–771)
Abbasid Caliphate (771–790s)
Aghlabids (790s–909)
Fatimid Caliphate (909–977)
Zirid dynasty (977–1014)
Hammadid dynasty (1014–1152)
Almohad Caliphate (1152–1232)
Hafsid dynasty (1232–1285)
Emirate of Béjaïa (1285–1510)
Hispanic Monarchy (1510–1555)
Ottoman Empire, regency of Algiers (1555–1833)
France, french Algeria (1833-1962)
Algeria (1962–present)

=== Prehistory ===
The presence of man is attested in various urban and peri-urban sites. The Ali Bacha cave station would represent the oldest settlement site around 40,000 to 20,000 BC. On the Aiguades site, the equipment and furniture found evoke a period around 10,000 BC and therefore Neolithic. The region is also rich in archaeological deposits such as the Afalou caves where some of the oldest burials of modern men, known as Mechta-Afalou men, have been found, which testifies to a culture focused on compassion with the burial of individuals in cave-sanctuary-necropolises and the use of clay pottery dated from 18,000 to 11,000 BC. These deposits are typical of the so-called Iberomaurusian archaeological culture.

=== Antiquity and Byzantine era ===
The city contains remains from the Bronze Age. The oldest known remains are a "hanout" which is a form of Libyc tomb. Long attributed to the Punic culture, it is in fact much older, its dating is interdetermined.

The advantageous site, sheltered from the winds by Cape Carbon, was surely occupied very early. The first trace of historical mention appears in the 5th century BC in the Periplus of Pseudo-Scylax. The region was part of the kingdom of Numidia. In addition, the Punic influence is present: the Carthaginians traveled the North African coasts to trade and establish trading posts called emporioe.

Jugurtha's defeat by the Romans changed the latter's alliance into a suzerainty; Augustus divided the territory into provinces constituting Caesarean Mauretania, and, according to Pliny the Elder, Saldae (the ancient name of the city) was a Roman colony founded with the first annexations in 33 BC. Eight years later, he returned the province of the city to the Numidian king Juba II in compensation for his hereditary states. The city acquired a predominantly Latin culture and was Christianized. The Romans set up various hydraulic networks that would be reused centuries later in the Hammadid era. The Toudja aqueduct dates from the reign of Antoninus Pius. But the city did not know the importance of the development of Hippo (Annaba), which flourished more under the Romans.

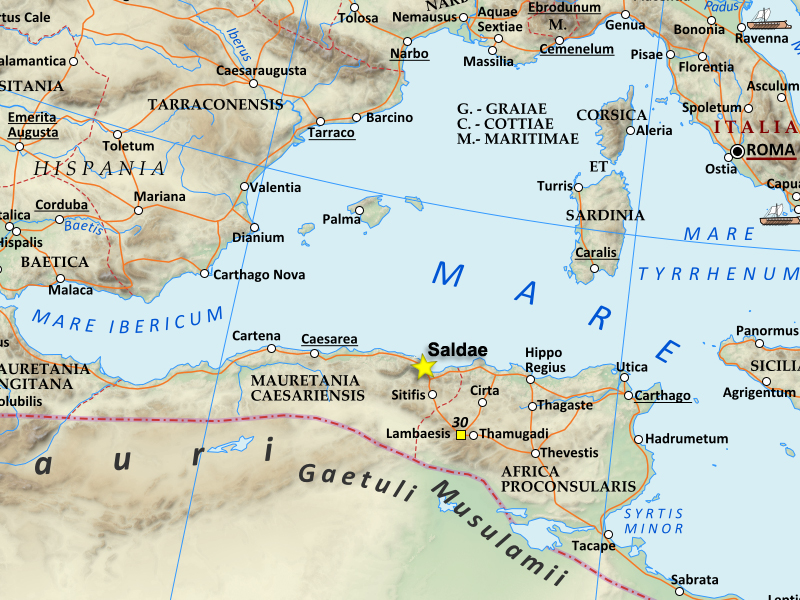
The Western Roman empire in the second century AD during the reign of Hadrian. Saldae can be seen on the south coast of the Mediterranean.

Augustus also founded Tubusuptus, the current ruins of Tiklat, a few kilometres away on the banks of the Nasava (Soummam). From the 1st century, the revolt of Tacfarinas involved all the Numidian populations of the region; he invested the Soummam valley, took Tiklat and reached Saldae. He was finally pushed back by the proconsul Publius Cornelius Dolabella. In the 4th century, in the mountains near Saldae, Firmus gathered the "Quinquegentians" (current Kabyle tribes of Djurdjura) and led them against the Romans. Count Theodosius arrived with troops from Europe to put down the revolt; he had difficulty overcoming the insurgents.

The Vandals in turn entered North Africa from Spain in 429. Led by Genseric, they carried iron to all the coastal towns. They made Saldae the capital of their new state until the capture of Carthage in 439. The struggles between the supporters of Arianism and those of Catholicism weakened the entire region; the Byzantines then found there a pretext and an opportunity to intervene. The city then fell under Byzantine domination in the Vandalic War in 533. The heavy Byzantine oppression also soon gave rise to the population's desire for revolt until the Arab conquest of North Africa.

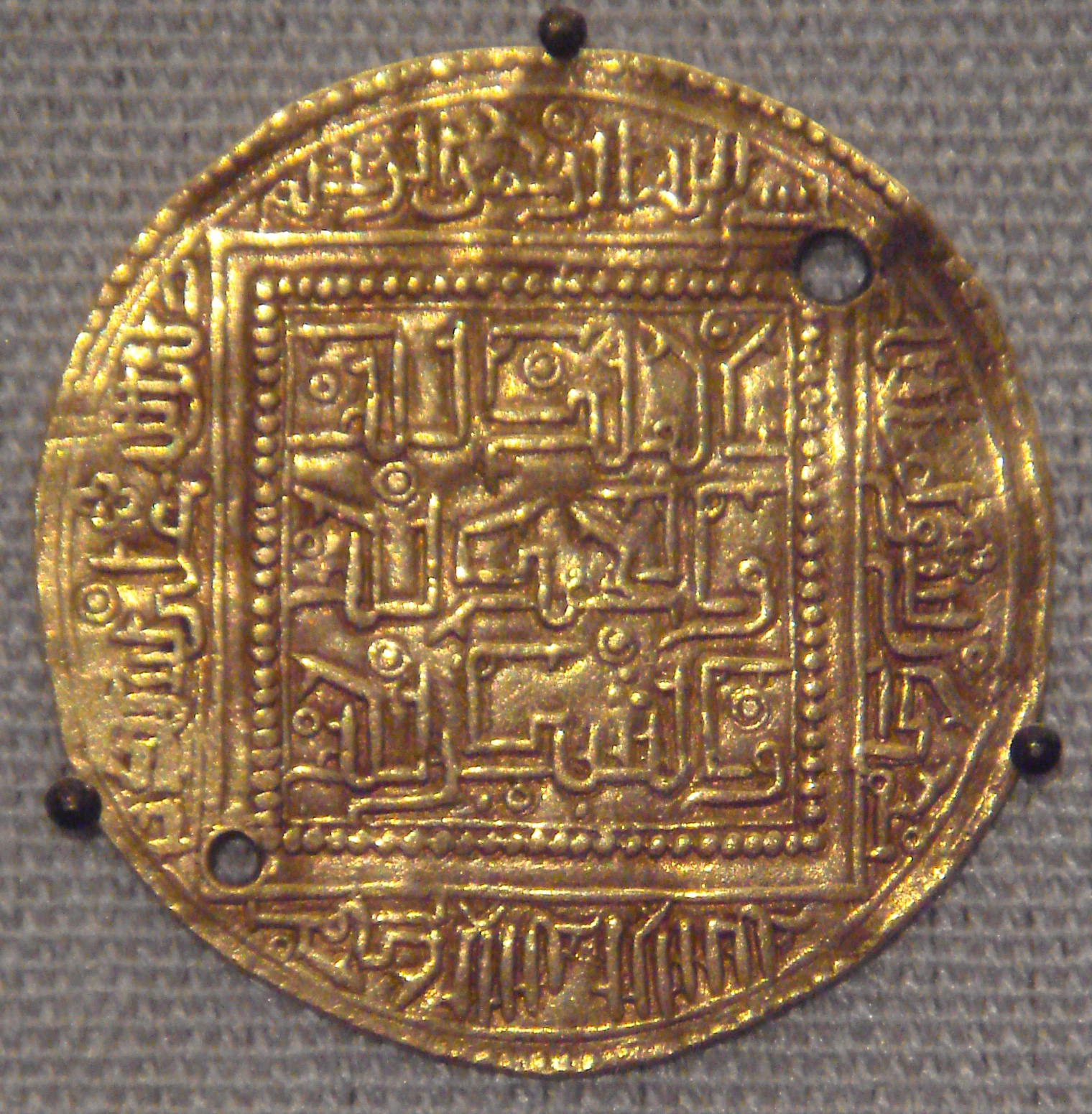
Coin of the Hafsids, with ornamental Kufic script, from Béjaïa, 1249–1276

=== Muslim and feudal rulers ===
==== The Arab Conquest ====
Seen by the Umayyad Arab conquerors who came from Kairouan, the mountains around Béjaïa were nicknamed el 'adua ("the enemy") to designate the stubborn resistance they were the seat of. Information on this period is scattered, or contradictory; it seems that the city was conquered relatively late, around the year 708. An unlikely hypothesis would have it that the name Béjaïa comes from this period from the Arabic word بقاية (Baqâyâ, "the remains, the survivors") because it would have served as a fallback for the Christian and Jewish populations of Constantine and Sétif. According to Ibn Khaldun, the name Béjaïa would rather come from that of the tribe that inhabited the city: the "Bedjaïa".

The three centuries that followed the conquest are obscure due to the lack of accounts. The city was part of the Aghlabid territory, then that of the Fatimids, under whose rule it experienced a certain effervescence. It seems that when the Hammadid sovereign Nasir founded his capital al-Nasirya there, in 1067, the monuments of ancient Saldae were in ruins. Several hypotheses supported by local traditions explain this state: the city would have experienced 7 earthquakes or a similar number of enemy attacks. It seems established that in the 10th century, the city was in the hands of the Sanhaja Berbers, from whom came the Zirid and Hammadid dynasties which reigned over the Central Maghreb. It is then a town essentially populated by Andalusis, in accordance with the description given by the Andalusi geographer al-Bakri, before the policy of the Hammadids gave a decisive boost to the city.

==== Berber dynasties: the glory of a medieval capital ====
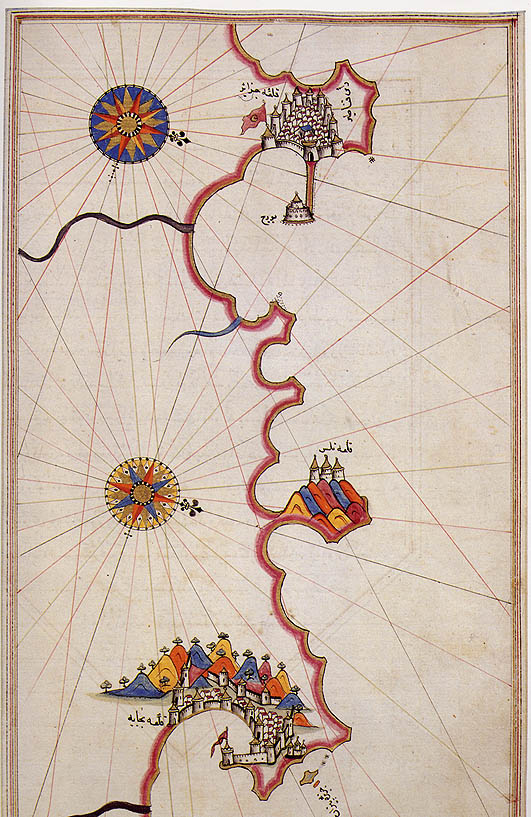
Historic map of Algiers and Béjaïa by Piri Reis

In the 10th century, the city was only a small fishing port. In 1067, the Berber sovereign of the Hammadid dynasty, Nasir ibn Alnas (1062–1088), ruling over the Central Maghreb, developed the city and made it his capital. Indeed, his first capital, the Qal'a of Banu Hammad, in the Highlands, was under threat from raids by the Hilalian Arab nomads who, hailing from the Middle East, had launched a second wave of Arab invasions into the Maghreb. He gave the city the name al-Nasiriya, which it would struggle to keep in the face of its toponym Béjaïa, which was already well established in usage. As Ibn Khaldun reports, this is due to the fact that the toponym Bejaïa is linked to the name of the Berber tribe populating this place.

Before acquiring its status as capital, the city experienced remarkable dynamism, particularly on the cultural level; it was in fact the port at the crossroads of the Qal'a of Banu Hammad, and al-Andalus. Scholars and traders passed through it and it was the outlet of the triq sultan, the royal road from the High Plateaus to the Mediterranean and even an outlet for trans-Saharan trade. The Kalbid emirs of Sicily were inspired by the palaces of Bejaïa to establish those of Palermo. The city, more than a recognized or appreciated place, was a place of obligatory passage; It is a real crossroads on the road from al-Andalus to the East (especially for pilgrims going to Mecca) but also from Europe to Africa. It is a place of meetings and exchanges of knowledge between local communities, from Europe and the East.

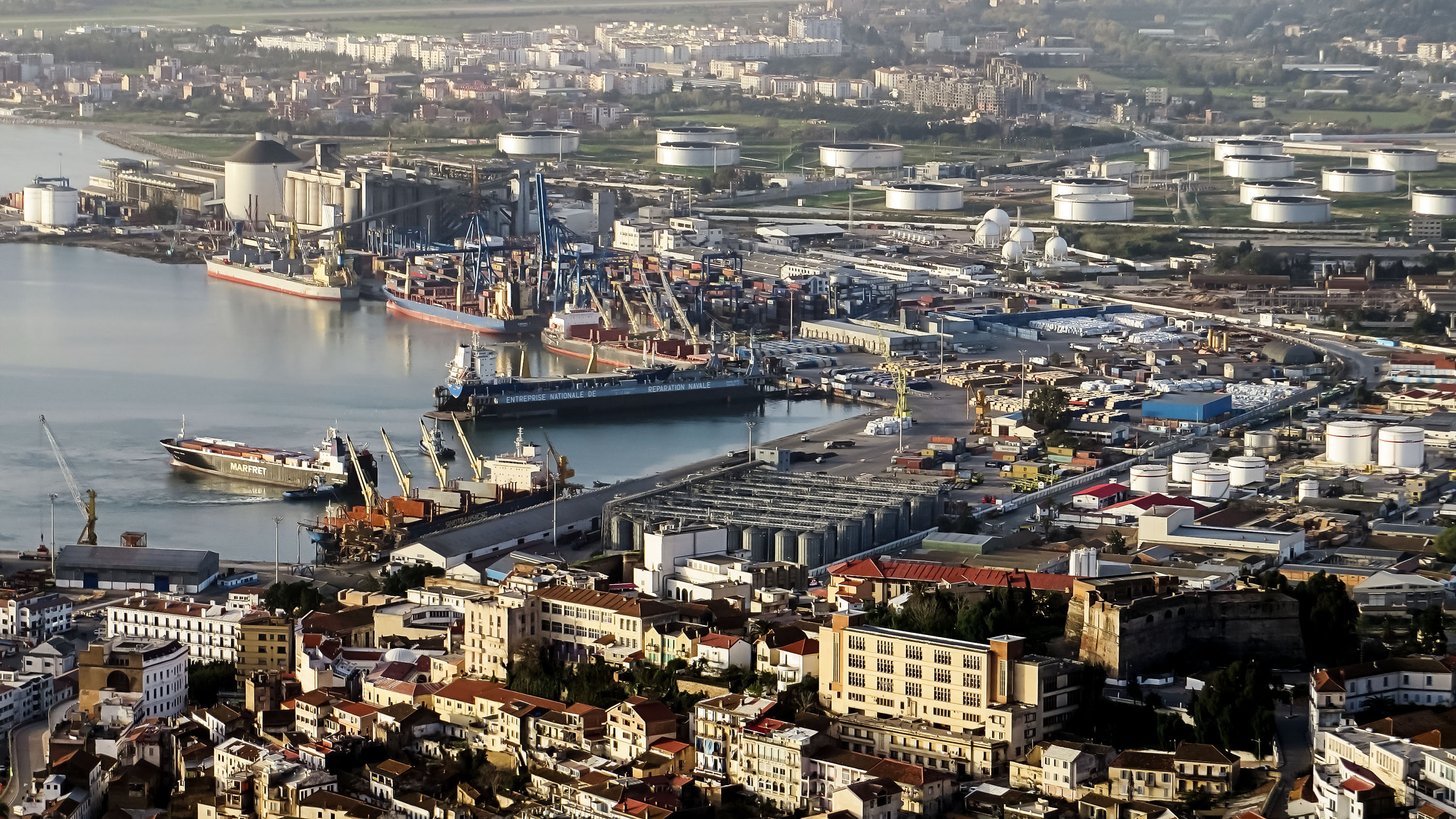
Port of Béjaia

The establishment of the Hammadid sovereigns will make it the capital of the Central Maghreb and the Algerian madinat at tarikh (the city of history). An original political fact on the scale of the ancient Maghreb, it is a coastal capital. It becomes one of the main cultural and scientific centers of the western Mediterranean and an important commercial center for Europe. If the precise state of the Bougiotte merchant fleet is unknown, it occupies a significant place in the Mediterranean without however being preponderant compared to the European merchant fleets. It is frequented by Latin merchants, Pisans and Genoese, Andalusis and later Catalans. These traders from the south of Europe gave it various names in Romance languages: Bugia, Buzia, Bugea, Buzana. It was at this time that the city's wax, exported to Europe for the making of candles, gave the word "bougie" to French and the word "basane" to designate skins; lexical borrowing of the transcribed names of the city (respectively Bougie and Buzana). The city exported beeswax and skins in quantity, tannic barks for working leather (the iscorzia di Bugiea was famous in the 14th century), alum, cereals, raisins, wool and cotton from Biskra and M'sila, metals and pottery. The city also imported various goods such as metals, fabric, dyes and medicinal herbs. It was also a naval base for the Hammadids, and the starting point for naval expeditions to the "country of Rum" (from which Sicily was three days' sailing). The Hammadid fleet played an important role in the western Mediterranean; it slowed down European advances, particularly those of the Normans of Sicily in the 12th century. The Hammadids attracted scholars from all backgrounds and practiced an open policy, particularly towards Europe. Jews and Christians benefited from favorable conditions; the Emir Nasir maintained regular correspondence with Pope Gregory VII and asked him to appoint a bishop for his city. The arrival of scholars made Béjaïa a leading city in the field of science; its influence extended beyond the Mediterranean and reached Europe. An Andalusian culture mixed with traditional oriental inspiration, secular sciences developed as did sacred sciences. Unlike the Qal'a in the hinterland, it is considered a cultural and "modern" city for its time; A "Berber city living in the oriental style", many illustrious scholars came from it or settled there throughout its medieval period: Al Madani (10th century), Ibn Hammad, Yahia Zwawi, Leonardo Fibonacci (12th century), Ramon Llull and Ibn Khaldun (13th century).

Scholars came to complete their training in the city as they did in Cairo, Tunis or Tlemcen. Hundreds of students, some of European origin, crowded into the schools and mosques where theologians, jurists, philosophers and scholars taught. The main places of medieval knowledge were the Great Mosque, Madinat al-`Ilm (the City of Sciences), the Khizana Sultaniya and the Sidi Touati Institute. The jurist Al Ghobrini (1246-1314), qadi of the city, described the scholars of Béjaïa as "princes of science", among whom were Abu Madyan, Abd al-Haq al-Isbili, al-Qurashi and Abu Tamim Ben Gebara. These scholars met in audiences where they consulted on various subjects.

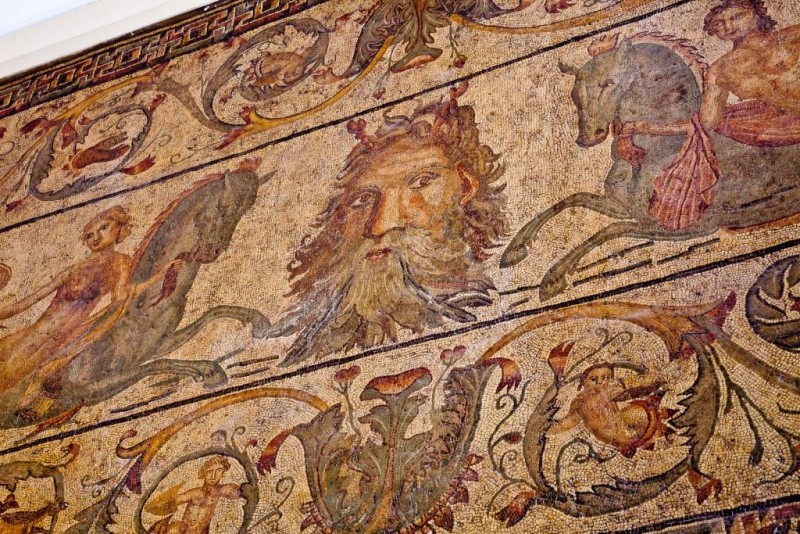
Roman mosaic depicting the Greek god Ocean on display at Bejaia City Hall.

There is a rivalry and intellectual exchanges between Tlemcen, the Zeneta and Béjaïa, the Sanhaja. This tolerance of the city is nuanced by one of the versions of the story of the death of Ramon Llull. Indeed, according to one version, he was stoned by the Bougiotes who had accused him of wanting to convert them to Christianity when other versions affirm that he was simply shipwrecked on his return to Mallorca from Tunis.

In 1202, Leonardo Fibonacci, an Italian mathematician, brought back the "Arabic numerals" and the algebraic notation. According to the versions, the inspiration for the Fibonacci sequence would be due to the observation of beekeepers and the reproduction of bees in the region or to a local mathematical problem concerning the reproduction of rabbits that he describes in his work Liber abaci.

At that time the city had developed so much that, according to Leo Africanus, it was populated by several tens of thousands of people from all over the Maghreb, the Levant, Europe and Asia. The indigenous population of the city was mainly composed of Berbers from the Kabyle hinterland and the large community of Andalusian refugees. The population estimate at that time is put at 100,000 inhabitants by Al Idrissi. Mohammad Ibn Tumart met Abd al-Mu'min, the one who would become the caliph of his movement and of a new state (the Almohads), near Béjaïa around 1118.

Mohammad Ibn Tumart preached a return to the sources of Islam from Mellala, a town located 10 km from Béjaïa. Years before, the Almohad guide was said to have been driven out by the people of Bejaia, whom he had strongly criticized for their morals. The political movement he founded was the basis of the Almohad Empire, which seized Bejaia in 1152 and deposed the Hammadids. The city retained its strategic importance under the Almohads; it became a provincial capital. The caliph Abd el Mumin appointed a member of his own family as governor of the city, a testament to its strategic importance. The city's port housed the caliph's fleet and that of the Hammadids, which he had seized. In 1183, for a brief period, the Banu Ghaniya (remnants of the Almoravid dynasty) seized Bejaia before the Almohads regained control of it.

After the breakup of the Almohad Empire, Béjaïa returned to the orbit of the Hafsid Berbers of Tunis who became independent in June 1228. But in reality, due to the fragmentation and succession disputes, the emir or sultan of Béjaïa became independent from that of Tunis at the head of a real dissident kingdom over various periods, the last of which before the Spanish conquest extended over the entire 15th century, at which time it was called the "kingdom de Bougie ". Trade remained active with the Christian states and the city was one of the main reception points for Andalusian refugees fleeing the Reconquista.

=== The centuries of decadence of Bejaia ===
Like the tragic fate suffered at the turn of the 15th century by many caravanserais and several medieval cities of the Sahara and the Maghreb coast, sometimes radically, those characterized by an economy significantly linked to trans-Saharan-Mediterranean trade as well as by a lack of substitutes inherently or de facto (such as Mahdia in Tunisia, Honaïne in Algeria, radically Sijilmasa in Morocco, etc.), Bejaia thus begins its decline in this context of a combination of circumstances of reconfiguration of world trade in favor of new maritime routes dominated at first by the Portuguese and the Dutch to the detriment of the previous caravan routes and what was related to them.

=== A coveted city ===
The Spanish, in the wake of the Reconquista, carried out raids on the ports of North Africa. The city was taken by the Spaniard Pedro Navarro in 1510 from Sultan Abdelaziz. The Spanish put an end to the "kingdom of Bougie" in the central Maghreb. They made the city one of their trading posts which was maintained thanks to relations with Pisa and Genoa. But their harshness caused the flight of the local population, and conflicts with the surrounding Berbers. The city could no longer serve as a relay for trade with the hinterland and Abu Bakr, Abdelaziz's brother and sultan, tried to retake the city in 1512 from his new capital, Constantine (using the Zianid siege system of the 14th century).

The Spanish were content to control a perimeter forming a sort of triangle between Bordj Abdelkader, the Casbah and Bordj Moussa. The city outside these limits was not defendable by the weak Spanish garrison and was ruined. The spirit of the Inquisition influenced local Spanish politics, the Jews were driven out of the city and the urban elites, including the scholars, fled. The scholarly tradition then moved massively to the zaouïas of the Kabyle hinterland, the manuscripts were also moved and dispersed. The population of the city was in free fall, and even the Spanish garrison was increasingly reduced; it numbered 500 men in 1555.

The former possessions of Béjaïa were fragmented, which hindered the reconquest of the city. In Kabylie, El Abbès, the son of the Sultan of Béjaïa, founded his principality around the Kalâa of Ait Abbès, taking part of the city's elites; on the west bank of the Soummam he was in competition with Belkadi, descendant of the Bougiote jurist Al Ghobrini who founded the Sultanate of Kuku. In Constantine it was Abou Bakr, brother of the former sultan, who proclaimed himself sultan over all of eastern Algeria. These various protagonists, rivals among themselves, each hoped to reconquer the city and unify its former dependencies.

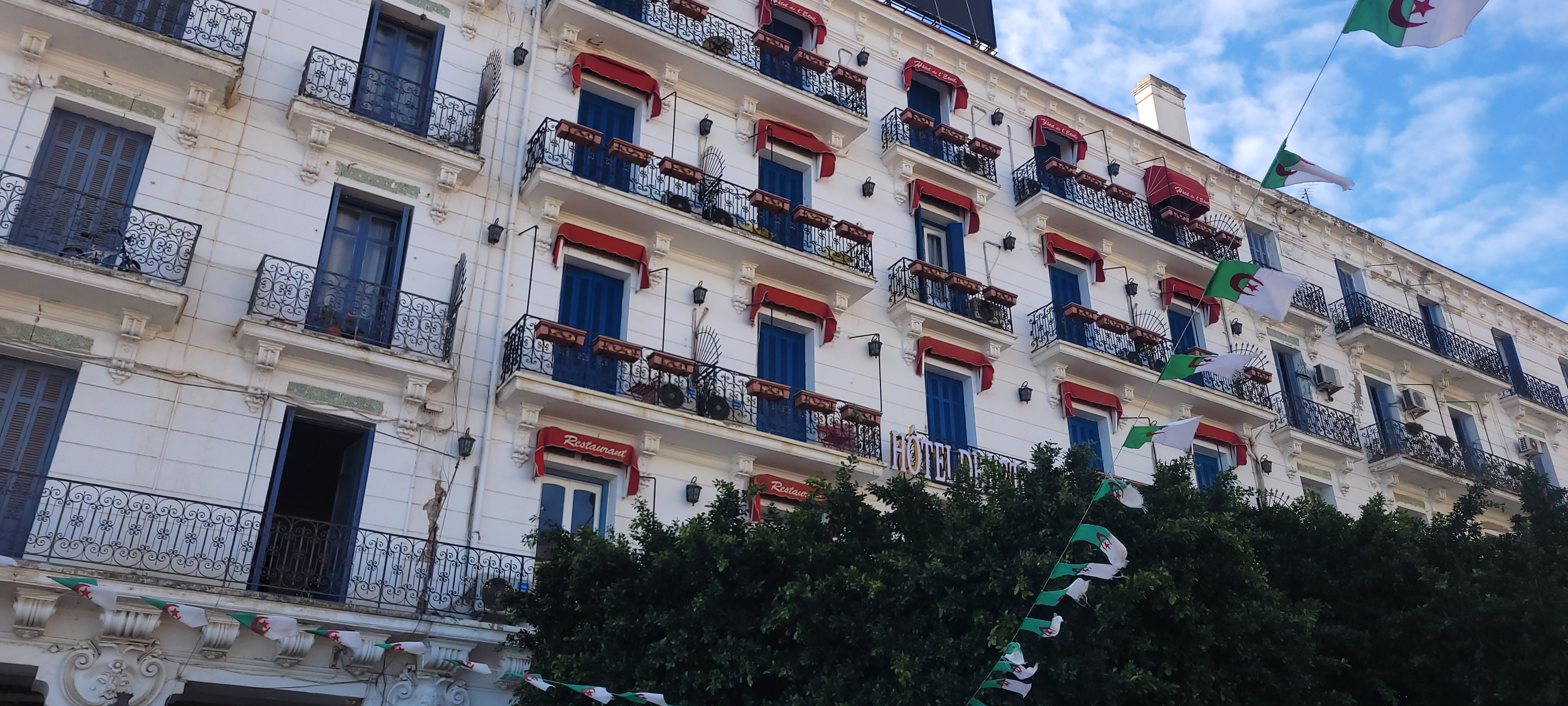
Hotel de l’Etoile, on Place du 1er Novembre (Place Gueydon)

It was at this time, when the old states were in decline, that the Barbarossa brothers, Greek corsairs converted to Islam, appeared and settled in the neighboring city of Jijel. They joined the various attempts to retake the city from the Spanish thanks to their expertise in navigation. They eventually founded their own state around Algiers, based partly on corsair activity, and rapidly extended their influence over northern Algeria by gradually entering the Ottoman orbit and presenting themselves in the eyes of the population as direct competitors of the Spanish. Béjaïa quickly became a strategic objective; the Barbarossa gradually ousted the Hafsids from Constantine and Annaba. Charles V used the city as a fallback after the disastrous 1541 expedition against Algiers.

=== A marginalized city ===
The Barbarossa would never achieve their goal of retaking Béjaïa during their lifetime. It was one of their successors, the beylerbey Salah Raïs, who finally entered the city after the Battle of Béjaïa (1555) with the help of the Kabyles of Koukou. The city was integrated into the Regency of Algiers and depended on the Beylik of Constantine until 1830. The territorial division into three beyliks placed the city in a marginal position. The political dream of the Barbarossa to establish their capital in Béjaïa was abandoned; the regency was already established in Algiers, which was a fortified port and in which many developments had been carried out. The only major institution maintained during this period was that of the dar senâa, the shipyards or arsenals of the city which supplied ships to the regency.

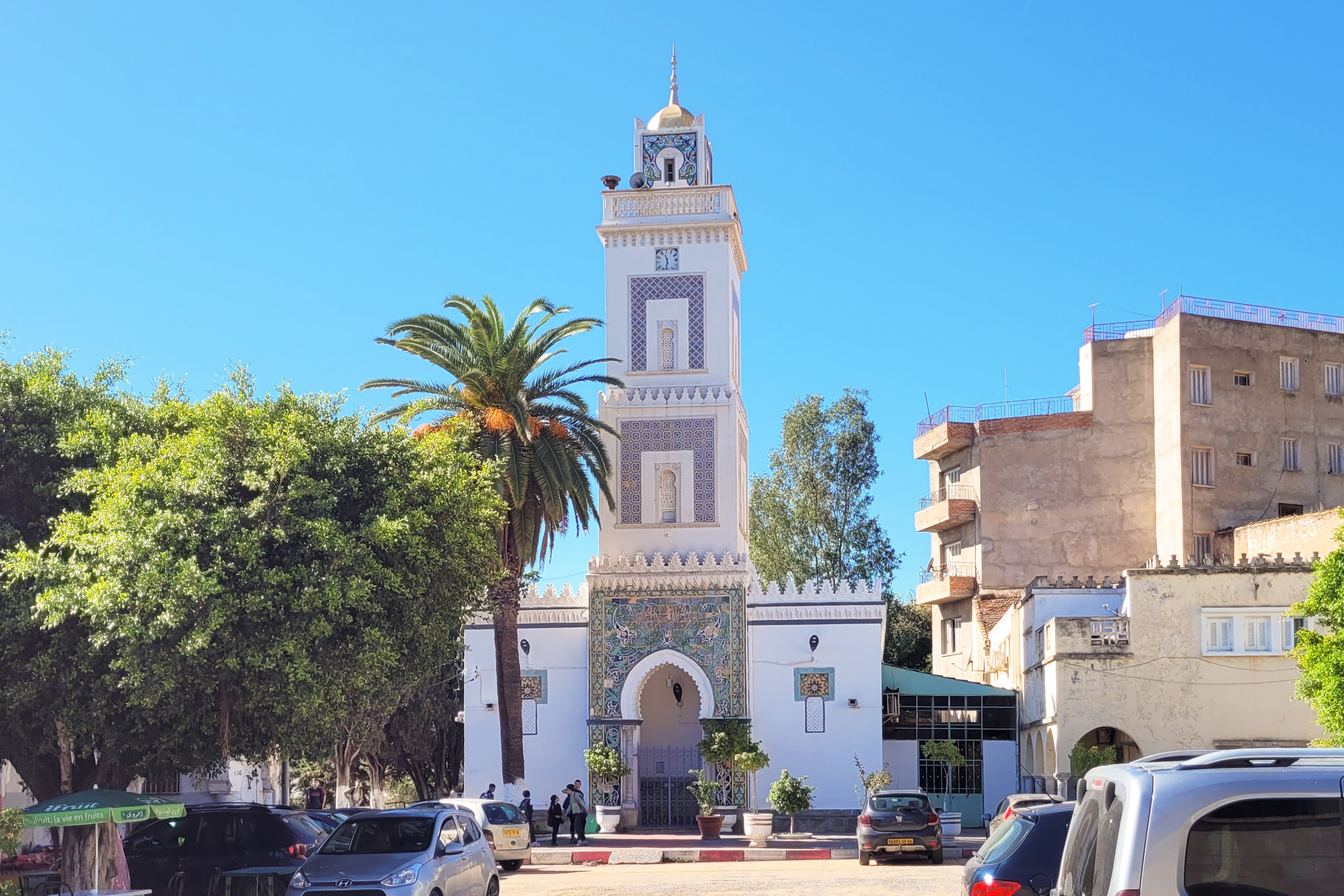
Sidi Soufi mosque

The city, with a Turkish caïd, was seen above all as a city that could potentially compete with Algiers and is surrounded by hostile mountains. The rise of its corsair fleets was closely monitored for fear of competition with that of Algiers; the Algiers fleet came to its coves, where it was naturally sheltered, during the winter. The city therefore saw its decline accelerate after the departure of the Spanish. The inhabitants maintained a small merchant fleet of about twenty feluccas which traded with Algiers, Oran, Bouna and Tunis to export the region's produce during favorable weather. In winter, this fleet was stationed on the beach of Dar senâa under the Casbah and not refloated until spring. The goods exported included oil, wax, dried figs, and leather; fabrics and cereals are imported. These ships could transport wood for the karasta: the exploitation of wood for the shipbuilding of Algiers. Corsair activity continued during this period, particularly with that of Jijel. In 1671, the city was targeted by the English led by Edward Spragge who bombarded it to stop the corsair attacks on their ships. During this entire period, the city was not maintained, and the descriptions of various travelers reflect the deterioration of the buildings and the lack of repair. Sidi M'hamed Amokrane, a marabout, son of the Sultan of Aït Abbas, Sidi Naceur Amokrane (or Mokrani), settled near Béjaïa around 1630, before going to Jijel. He moved his zaouïa from the village of Ama'dan to the city where the Turks charged him with running the karasta. At the time of Al Warthilani (1713 – 1779), the city was in the hands of three important figures: the cadi, the caid and the descendant of the marabout Mokrani.

The caids asked the marabouts to pass under the laânaya (protection) of the troops of Béjaïa until Algiers. Indeed, the city located in the heart of Kabylie, independent of the executive power of Algiers, was often besieged during insurrectional conflicts between the various confederations of the region. During the great revolt of 1806, led by the sheriff Ben el Harche, the city was besieged without success. In 1823, the tribes of Bibans and Soummam seized the caid of the city. In 1825, the agha Yahia, commander of the troops from Algiers, invaded the city and launched operations of repression against the tribes of Soummam.

=== The fall of the regency and the colonial period ===
In 1830, the French launched the conquest of Algeria. At first, the expedition was directed against Algiers. But very soon, the invaders sought to occupy the entire country, in particular Kabylie against which several expeditions were directed. Béjaïa, which had come under the control of the Mezzaïa tribe after the fall of the dey of Algiers, was involved in several incidents with French and British ships. In 1831, two expeditions aimed at imposing as its caïd a man named Mourad, then a certain Bou Setta, were thwarted. A new expedition resulted in the capture of the city in 1833, after fierce resistance from its inhabitants. However, the French failed to conquer the surrounding area.

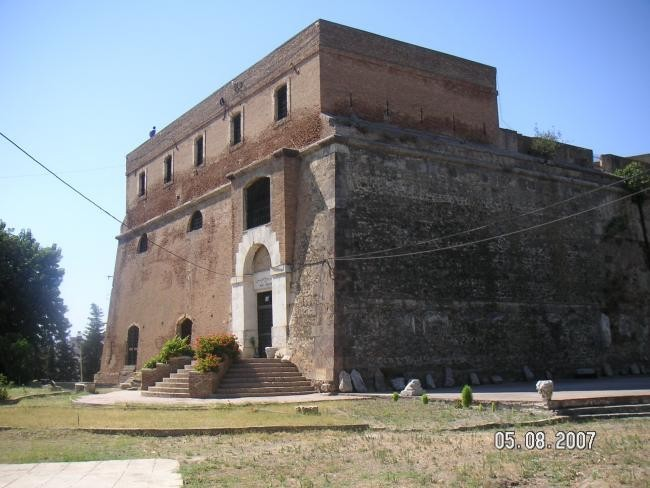
Bordj Moussa

The city and its region put up fierce resistance to the French colonial presence; moreover, like the Spanish in the 16th century, the French were content with a limited occupation until 1846. Various defensive works were built around the square, particularly on the heights.

The city took part in several uprisings and insurrections, such as that of the sheriff Boubaghla, and especially the great revolt of Sheikh El Mokrani and Sheikh Aheddad in 1871. At the time of the French conquest, the city was no more than a very modest town of around 2,000 inhabitants. The city was made a fully-fledged commune by decree of 17 June 1854. The French partially filled in the bay and developed the city's port and outer harbor. Urban planning work (development of the seafront and major roads) left its mark on its urban fabric. It gradually regains its role as an outlet for Kabylia, and as an export port for local agricultural products. Algerian inhabitants still maintain their coastal shipping activity. In 1906, the Cape Carbon lighthouse was built, it is the highest in the world due to its natural location (altitude 220 meters) and it has a range of 33 miles.

During World War II, Operation Torch landed forces in North Africa, including a battalion of the British Army's Queen's Own Royal West Kent Regiment at Béjaïa on 11 November 1942. That same day, at 4:40 PM, a German Luftwaffe air raid struck Béjaïa with thirty Ju 88 bombers and torpedo planes. The transports Awatea and Cathay were sunk and the monitor HMS Roberts was damaged. The following day, the anti-aircraft ship SS Tynwald was torpedoed and sank, while the transport Karanja was bombed and destroyed.

On May 8, 1945, the repression led by the French colonial forces in Kherrata, where the navy was used for a naval bombardment of the coasts of the Béjaïa region, caused thousands of victims.

During the Algerian War of Independence, the organization of the FLN and the ALN created for the first time a Kabyle administrative territory, the wilaya III; Béjaïa is part of this group. The Soummam congress, which is the political meeting of the FLN which sets the political-military line of the Algerian national movement in the war, takes place in Ouzellaguen, in the Bougiote hinterland.

=== The modern agglomeration ===
On the eve of the Algerian War in 1954, it had 30,000 inhabitants, including 6,200 Europeans. One of the last decisions of the colonial administration was to build an oil pipeline from Hassi Messaoud, with the city as a terminal depot and oil port. In 1959, Béjaïa was the most important oil port in Algeria, which was a source of income. In 1962, it was integrated into the wilaya of Sétif, before becoming the seat of its own wilaya in 1974. The city experienced a demographic boom, and an urbanization of the Lekhmis plain, following the influx of rural people, particularly from Kabylie.

Béjaïa, like other cities in Soummam, was one of the centers of Berber identity claims during the Berber Spring of 1980; and in 2001, during the Black Spring. If it struggles to establish itself as the economic capital of Little Kabylia, it is undeniably the cultural capital of Kabylia, in competition with Tizi-Ouzou. The opening of the political field has allowed the emergence of groups, associations, artistic and cultural events of all types. The University Center, by its presence, supports the movement; a Tamazight language institute is planned to be installed in Béjaïa.

This rapid expansion of the city is also a challenge in terms of urban planning; the city is indeed struggling to ensure a hinterland due to the relief. On the other hand, heritage and culture are also an issue because they are threatened in the long term. The exceptional site also raises the environmental question and that of pollution linked to domestic and industrial activities. In the early 1990s, the increase in population combined with the lack of planning and the inadequacy of public policies degraded the living environment of the city, despite certain assets for its future.

== Urban planning ==
=== Downtown ===
The downtown of Béjaïa comprises the colonial quarter and the old town, the medina, itself largely reshaped by urban planning during the Spanish Empire and later by French Algeria. The old town is nestled against the Gouraya massif; it was marked by the Spanish presence, during which it lost numerous medieval buildings (such as the Hammadid Palace of the Star), and then by French developments. This area, however, is not lacking in ancient (particularly archaeological) or medieval buildings and remains; the Acherchour, Karamane, and Bab El Louz districts still boast Moorish houses. But due to a lack of maintenance, public awareness, and preservation, the introduction of inauthentic materials (concrete, brick, etc.) threatens this heritage. The city's defensive structures are still present in various locations within the old town (Bab el Bounoud, the Hammadid wall near the port, the Casbah, etc.). The colonial part of the city is particularly notable for the seafront district, which encroaches upon part of the old town and the port. Inspired by Haussmannian architecture, it also includes the famous Place du 1er Novembre, still known as Place Geydon.

=== Outlying neighborhoods ===
In the wake of independence, urban development continued along the lines of colonial planning, maintaining the same axes. The expansion of Béjaïa to the west and south was marked by the construction of new housing developments in Ighil Ouazoug and state-built housing estates in Sidi Ahmed, as well as the Plaine district and the Krim Belkacem and Aurès boulevards. Alongside the construction of state housing estates, private construction encroached haphazardly onto the plain. Urban development in the Ihadaden area is the most recent. Within the municipality, on the city's outskirts, lie natural areas—such as Gouraya Park—and agricultural zones—such as the Soummam plain and valley—which contribute to the unique character of the city's setting.

In addition to the city of Béjaïa, the administrative municipality of Béjaïa (which encompasses a wider area than the city itself, including a significant portion of Gouraya Park) comprises the following localities : Dar Naceur, P.K. 17, Boukhiama, Ihaddaden, Targa Ouzemour, Ighil Ouazzoug, Bir Slam, Iriyahen Est, Aérodrome, Boulimat, Oued Saket, and Amtik Tafat. These localities are situated at varying distances from the city.

=== Management of historical heritage ===
Due to its ancient history, Béjaïa possesses a rich heritage. This heritage extends well beyond the city itself: the ruins of Tiklat and the Tikdja aqueduct, the Zayyanid citadel at El Kseur, and the scholarly heritage relocated during times of crisis—such as the Spanish invasion of 1510—are all elements of the hinterland's heritage directly linked to the city's history.

A project to study the rehabilitation and heritage designation of the Béjaïa medina, led by UNESCO and involving local stakeholders, has been underway since 2003. Furthermore, the Algerian state has already listed several of the city's sites as national heritage: the remains of the Bab Fouka (Fouka Gate) fortifications, Bordj Moussa, the Casbah of Béjaïa, Bab el-Bahr (Sea Gate), the Roman cistern, and the Roman cippus (a funerary stone embedded in a city fountain).

Although the city lacks global recognition for its historical status, it possesses a unique heritage shaped by centuries of accumulated history. The integration of ancient human settlements into an exceptional natural setting lends great complexity to the city's urban fabric. This diverse yet underutilized heritage could drive job creation and revenue generation by highlighting the city's cultural and tourism potential. However, assessments reveal significant deterioration, despite the heritage's value and its potential role in the city's sustainable development. This situation stems from a management approach handled exclusively by official bodies with poorly defined areas of responsibility.

City properties designated as national heritage sites

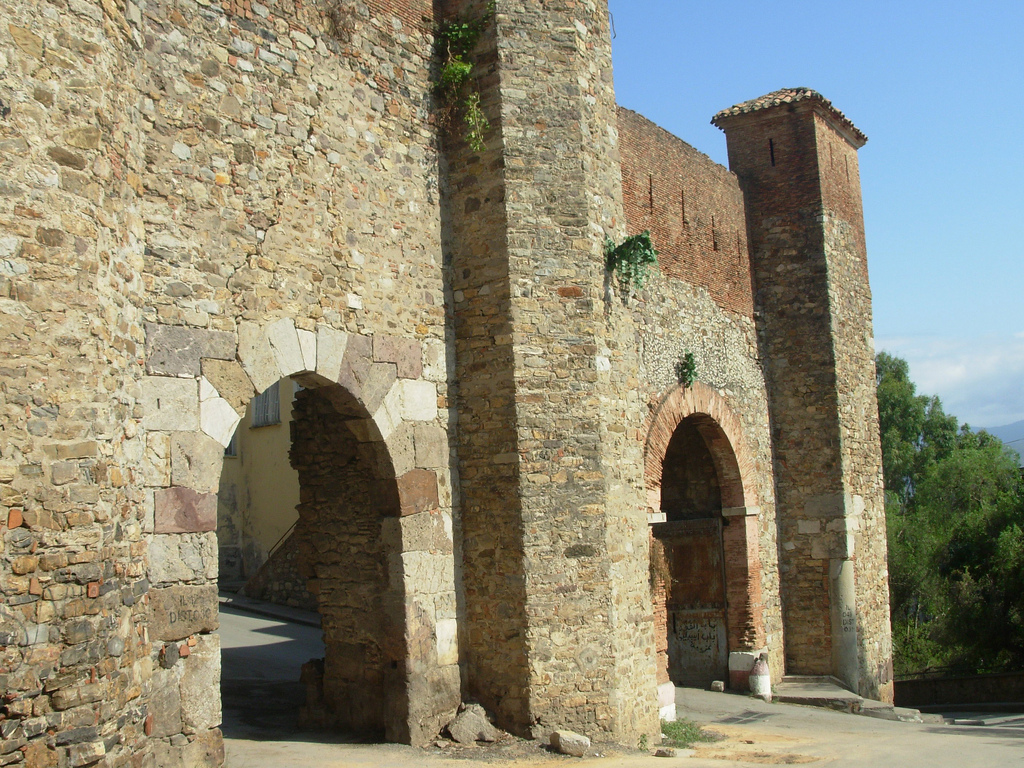
Remains of the fortified enclosure of the gate of banners

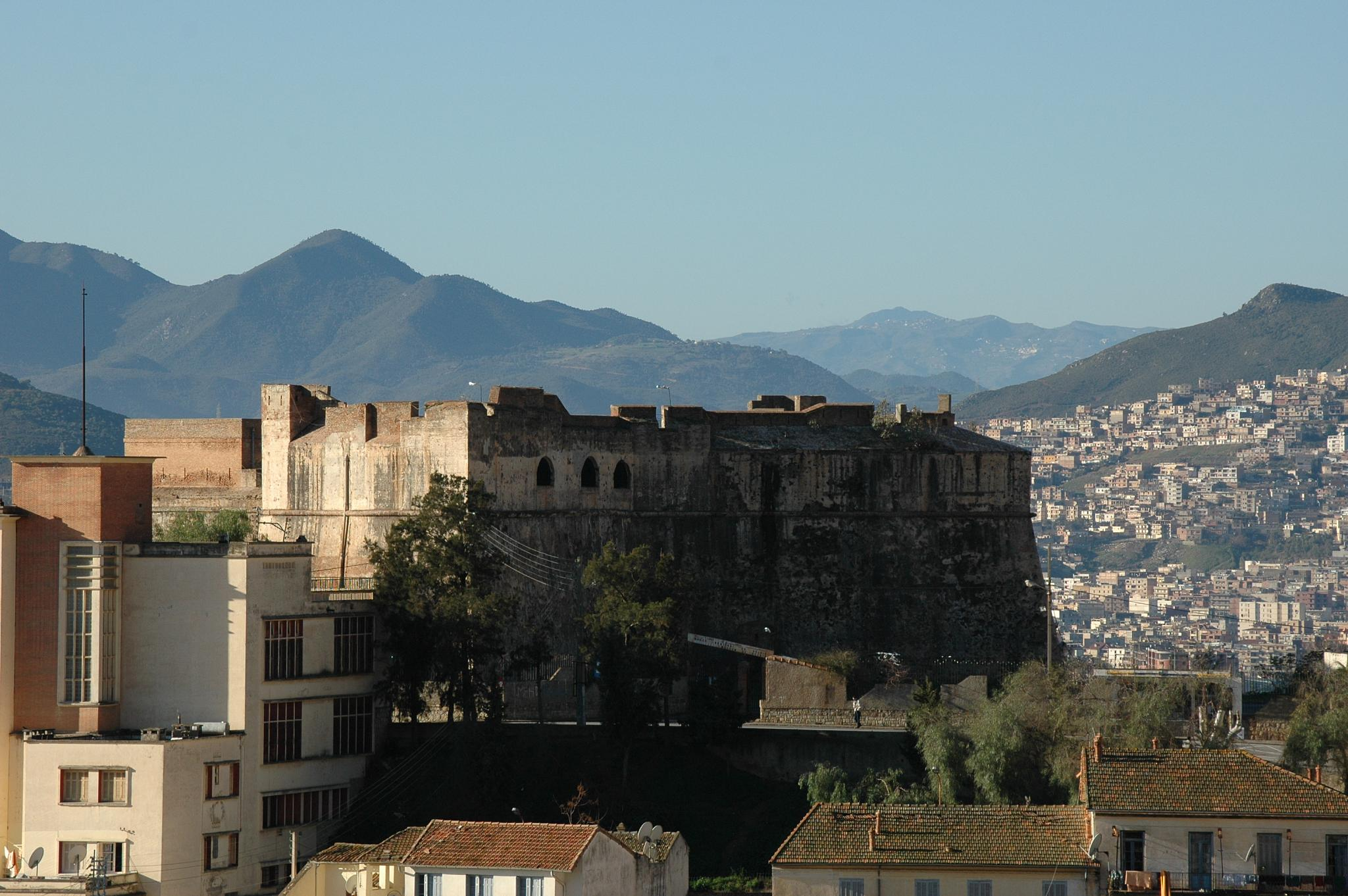
Bordj Moussa

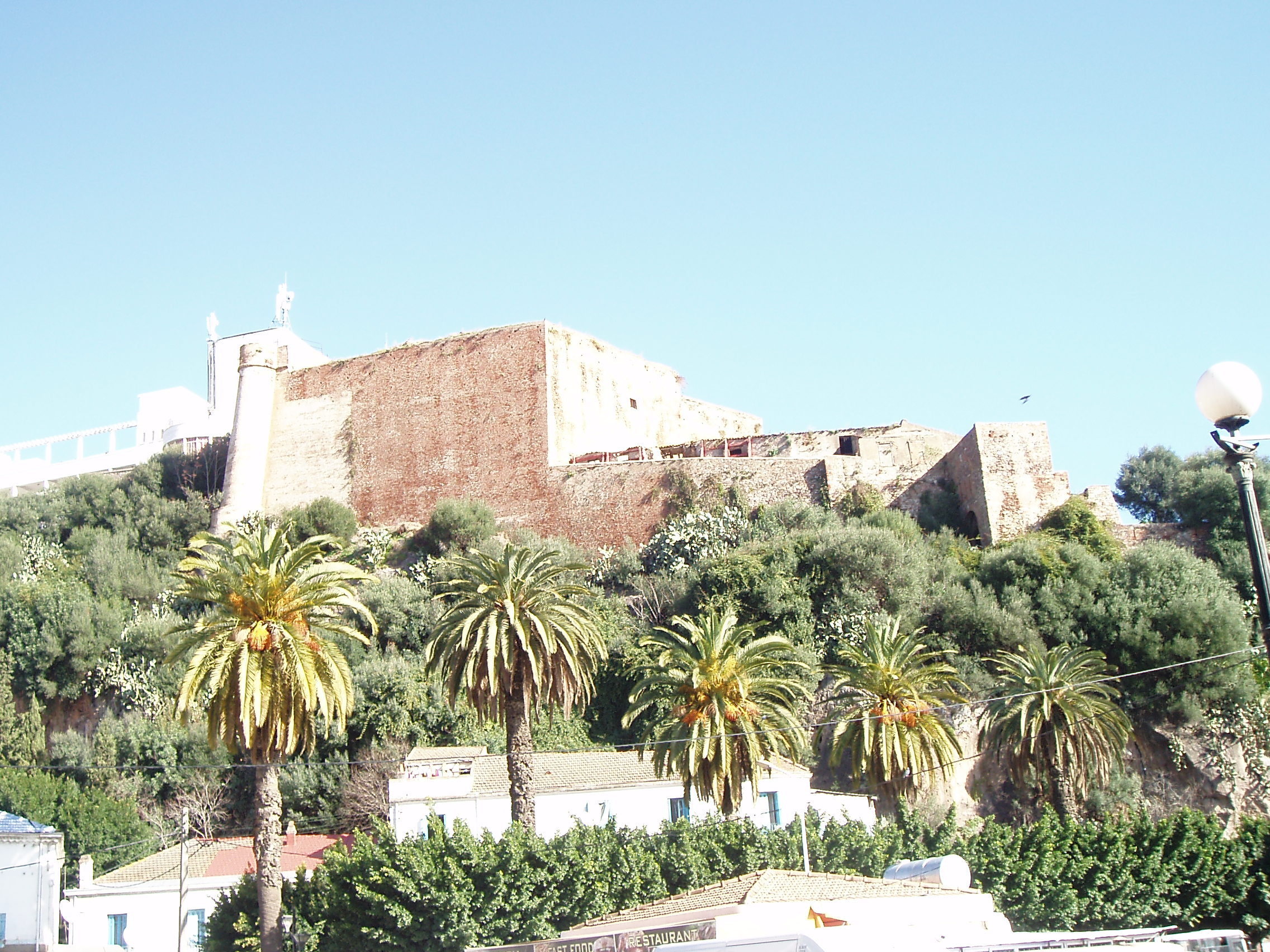
Casbah of Béjaïa (citadel) overlooking the port of Béjaïa, dating from the Hammadid Berber period

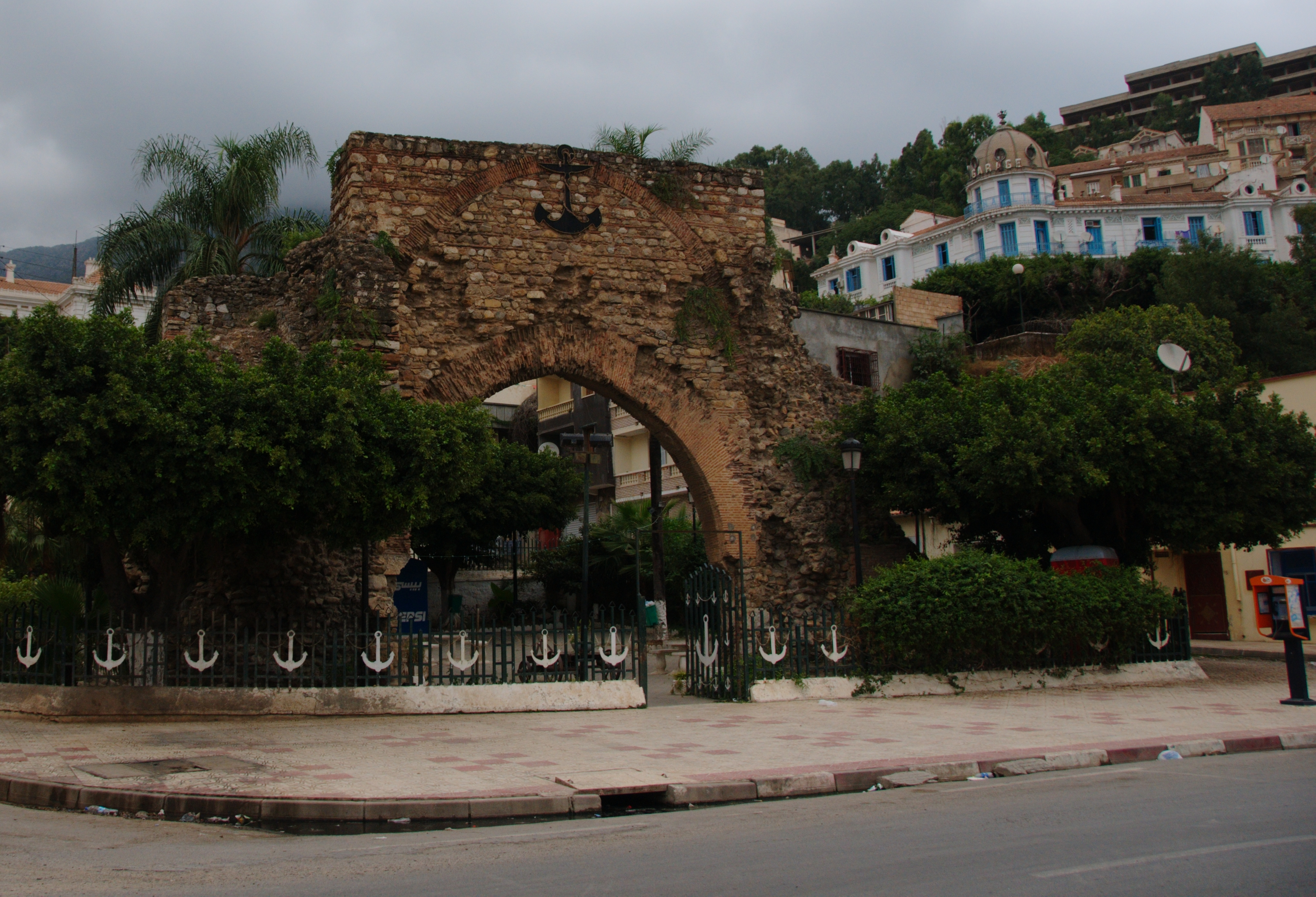
Saracen Gate (also known as the Sea Gate)

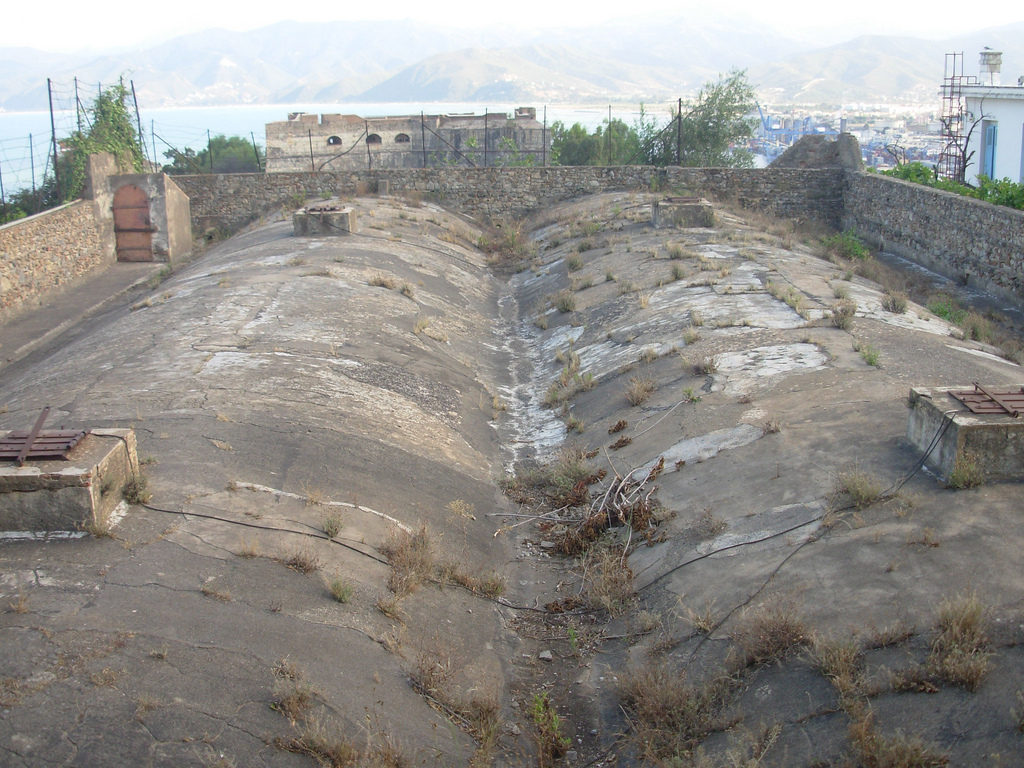
Roman cistern

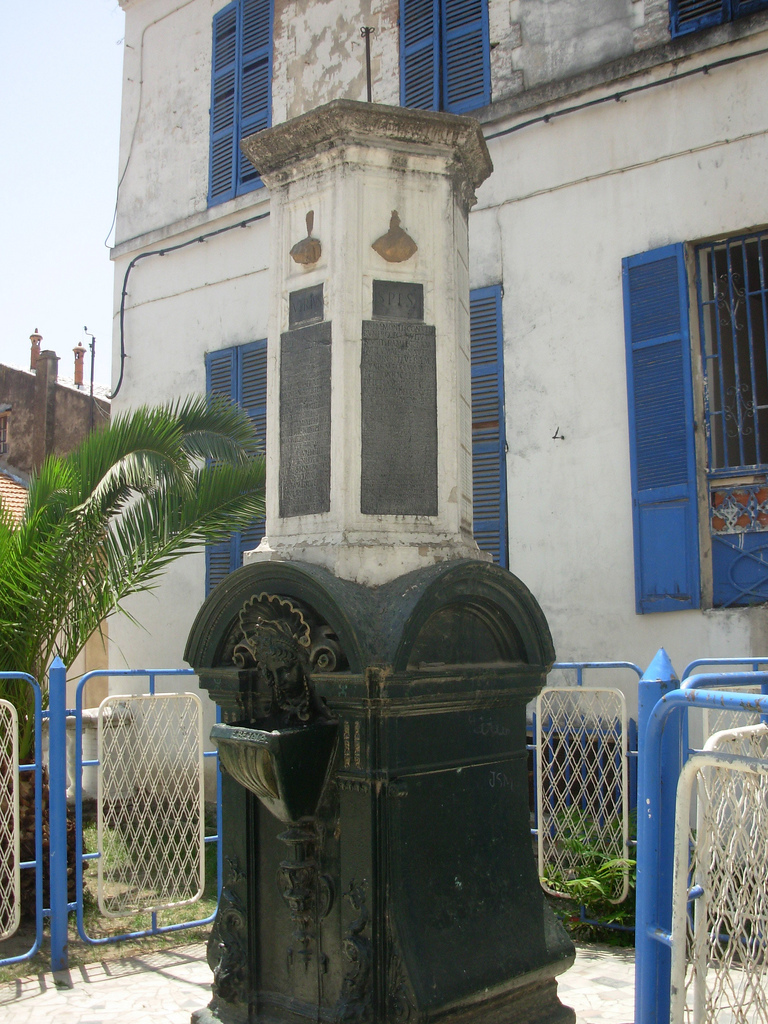
Roman cippus

== Demographics ==
Carbon Cape Lighthouse
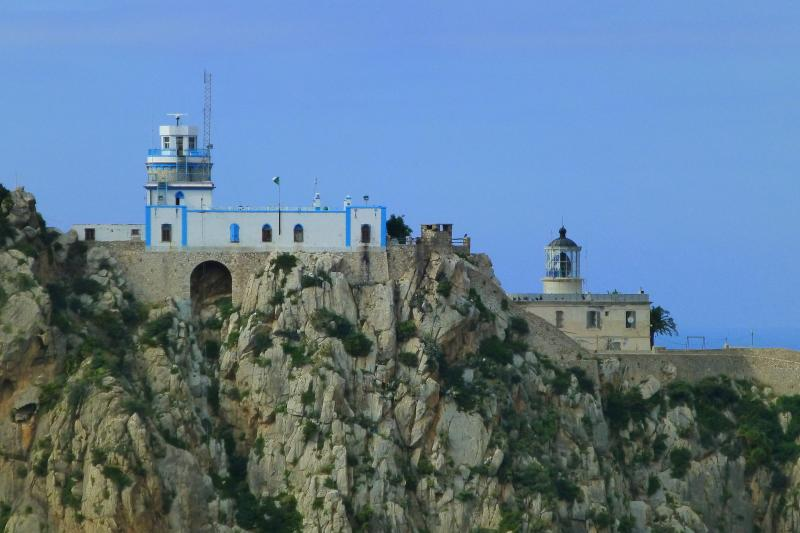
- Cap Carbon Lighthouse in 2013
- Location: Carbon Cape, Béjaïa, Algeria
- Coordinates: 36°46′31″N 5°06′11″E

Tower
- Constructed: 1906
- Construction: stone (tower)
- Height: 14.6 m (48 ft)
- Shape: cylindrical tower with balcony and lantern rising from the keeper's house
- Markings: White (tower), black (roof)
- Operator: National Maritime Signaling Office

Light
- Focal height: 224.1 m (735 ft)
- Range: 28 nmi (52 km; 32 mi)
- Characteristic: Fl(3) W 20s

The population of the city was 177,988 as of the 2008 census.

Historical populations
Year	Population	Year	Population	Year	Population	Year	Population
1901	14,600	1926	15,900	1954	43,900	1977	74,000
1906	17,500	1931	25,300	1960	63,000	1987	114,500
1911	10,000	1936	30,700	1966	49,900	1998	144,400
1921	19,400	1948	28,500	1974	104,000	2008	177,988

== Economy ==
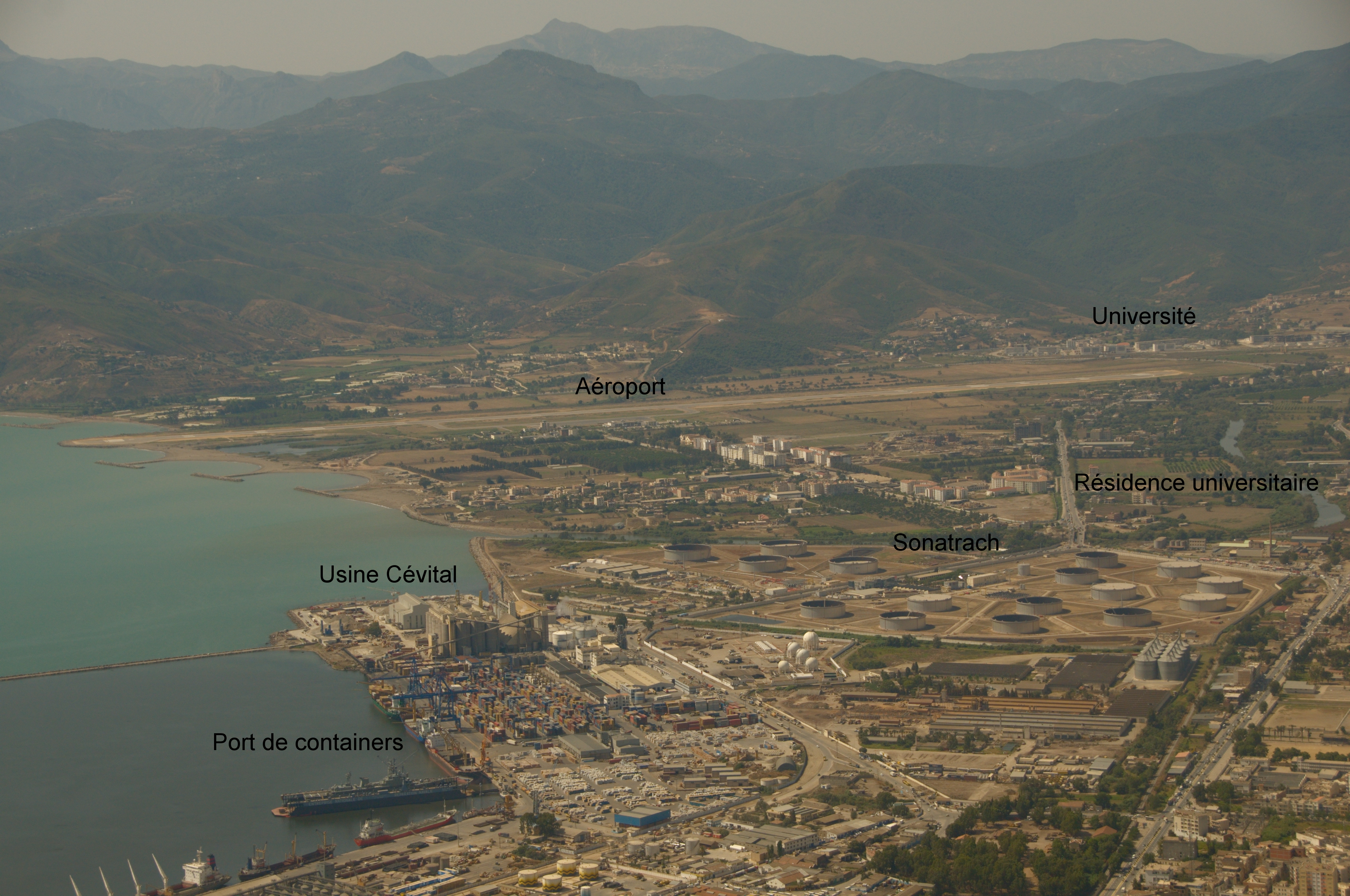
Maritime front of Béjaïa: a view of its industrial facilities and the airport.

The northern terminus of the Hassi Messaoud oil pipeline from the Sahara, Béjaïa is an oil exporting port. Other exports include iron ore, phosphates, and wine. The city also has a cork industry.

Cevital, the largest private conglomerate in Algeria, is headquartered in the city.

== Sports ==
The city is home to football clubs JSM Béjaïa and MO Béjaïa.

== Twin towns – sister cities ==
Béjaïa has an official friendly relationship with:

- (United Kingdom) Glasgow, Scotland, since 1995
- (France) Brest
- (Germany) Bad Homburg

== Villages ==
- Ilougane

== Notable people ==
- Zaki Hannache (born 1987), human rights activist
- Rebiha Khebtani (1926–2006), politician
- Nassim Oussalah (born 1981), footballer
- Fares Arfa (born 1994), fencer

== See also ==
- European enclaves in North Africa before 1830
- List of lighthouses in Algeria
- Saldae, for Roman history and concurrent Catholic titular see
- Great Mosque of Béjaïa

Related people

- Abu al-Salt
- Fibonacci

== Sources ==
- Annales algériennes de géographie (in French). Institut de géographie de l'Université d'Alger. 1966.
- Aïssani, Djamil; Djehiche, Mohammed (2011). Les échanges intellectuels Béjaia-Tlemcen (in French). Tlemcen, capitale de la culture islamique. ISBN 978-9961-9-9818-2.
- Atkinson, Rick (2013). An Army At Dawn: The War in North Africa, 1942-1943. Little, Brown Book Group. ISBN 978-1-4055-2727-9.
- Cote, M. (1 April 1991). Encyclopédie berbère (in French). Aix-en-Provence: Éditions Peeters. ISBN 2-85744-509-1.
- Féraud, Laurent-Charles (1 January 2001). Histoire de Bougie (in French). Éditions Bouchène. ISBN 978-2-912946-28-7.
- Ferréol, Gilles; Berretima, Abdel-Halim, eds. (16 November 2015). La ville méditerranéenne : défis et mutations : Actes de colloque international (28-29/11/13, Béjaïa) (in French). EME éditions. ISBN 978-2-8066-3534-1.
- Habsbourg, Louis Salvator de (2000) [1899]. Bougie: La perle de l'Afrique du Nord (in French). Paris/Montréal: L’Harmattan. ISBN 2-7384-8455-7.
- Haddadou, Mohand Akli (2012). Dictionnaire toponymique et historique de l'Algérie: comportant les principales localités, ainsi qu'un glossaire des mots arabes et berbères entrant dans la composition des noms de lieux (in French). Tizi Ouzou: Achab. ISBN 978-9947-972-25-0.
- Julien, Charles-André (1966) [1951]. Histoire de l'Afrique du Nord; des origines à 1830 (in French). Paris: Payot.
- Kaddache, Mahfoud (2011) [1982]. L'Algérie des Algériens (in French). Alger: Société nationale d'édition et de diffusion. ISBN 978-9961-9-6621-1.
- Kheladi, Mokhtar (1 January 1993). Urbanisme et systèmes sociaux: la planification urbaine en Algérie (in French). Office des publications universitaires.
- Lalmi, Nedjma Abdelfettah (2004). "On the Myth of the Kabyle Cultural Island". Cahiers d'Études Africaines (in French). 44 (175): 507–531. doi:10.4000/etudesafricaines.4710.
- Ministère de l'information (1970). Bejaïa (in French). Ministère de l'information; diffusion : SNED.
- Scott, T.C.; Marketos, P. (23 March 2014). "On the Origin of the Fibonacci Sequence" (PDF). MacTutor History of Mathematics, University of St Andrews.
- Valérian, Dominique; Aissani, Djamil (2003). "Mathématiques, commerce et société à Béjaïa (Bugia) au moment de séjour de Leonardo Fibonacci (XII-XIII)". Bollettino di Storia delle Scienze Matematiche (in French). XXIII (2): 9–31.
- Valérian, Dominique (2006). Bougie, port maghrébin, 1067-1510 (in French). Rome: Publications de l’École française de Rome. ISBN 978-2-7283-0748-7.
- Zirem, Youcef (2013). Histoire de Kabylie: Le point de vue kabyle (in French). Fouesnant: Yoran Embanner. ISBN 978-2-914855-98-3.
- Zouggaghe; Mouni; Taffer (March 2014). "Qualité biologique du réseau hydrographique du bassin versant de la Soummam. (Nord de l'Algérie)" (PDF). Larhyss Journal (17): 21–33. ISSN 1112-3680.
