= Gouraya National Park =

Costal national park in Algeria

- IUCN category II (national park)
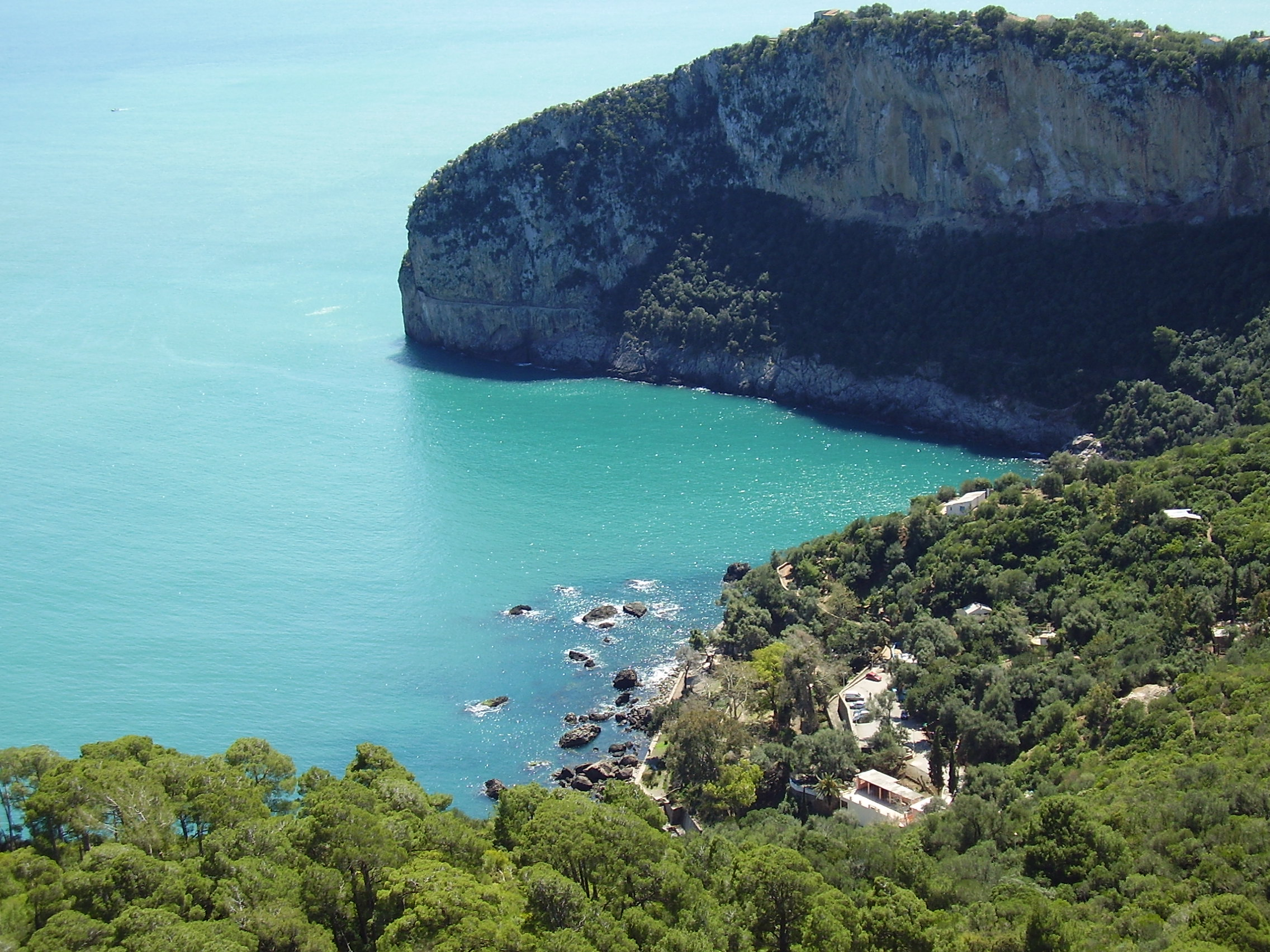
- The Aiguades

- Location within Algeria
- Interactive map of Gouraya National Park
- Location: Béjaïa Province, Algeria
- Nearest city: Béjaïa
- Coordinates: 36°46′N 5°6′E
- Area: 20.8 km^{2} (8.0 sq mi)
- Established: 1984
- Visitors: 60.000 (in 2005)

The national park of Gouraya (Kabyle: Urti Aɣelnaw n Guraya, Arabic: الحديقة الوطنية قورايا) is one of the coastal national parks of Algeria. It is located in Béjaïa Province, near the shrine of Sidi Touati.

== History ==
The park became an Algerian National Park in 1984, and has been UNESCO-recognized as a biosphere reserve in 2004.

== Description ==
The park owes its name to the Gouraya Mountain (altitude 660m) located within the park's boundaries. The ground elevation in the park oscillates between -135m and 660m. There is also a lake, the Lake Mézaïa.

The park is located on a calcaro-dolomitic ground.

The park is north-east of Béjaïa, close to the city. The park includes many beaches and cliffs, which make it a swimming destination for many Algerians.

== Population ==
The permanent population in the Gouraya National Park is of Berber origins, 1,655 inhabitants across 13 villages.

== Wildlife ==
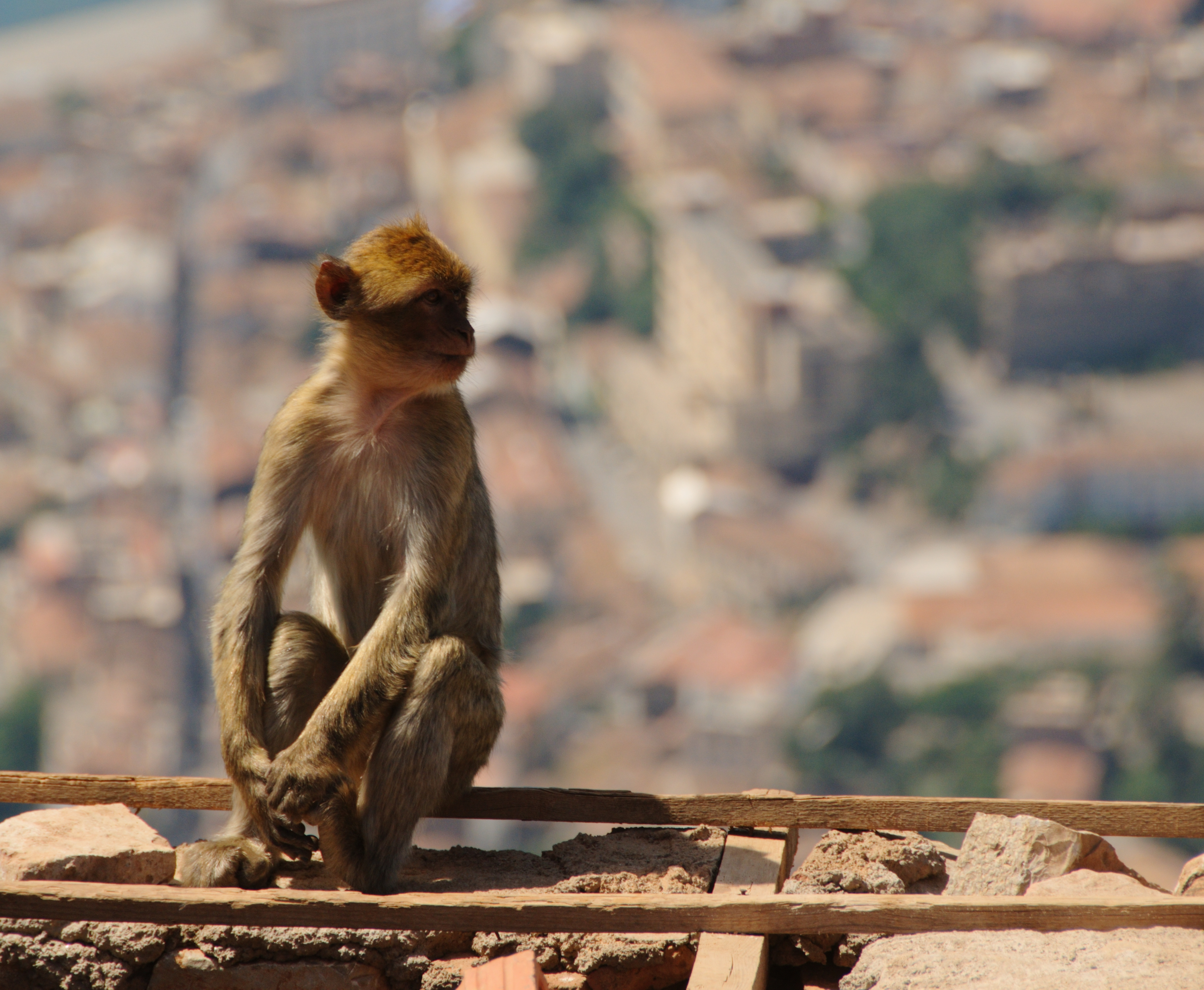
A magot in Yemma Gouraya.

The park is home to a wide variety of flora and fauna, including Barbary macaques and jackals who live in the park's forests. The Barbary macaque is a primate with a very restricted range in portions of northwestern North Africa and disjunctively in Gibraltar.

In 2011, the French Institut National de la Recherche Agronomique led a phytosociological study which concluded there were 7 vegetation groups belonging to 4 phytosociological classes:

- Quercetea ilicis Braun-Blanquet (1947)
- Querco-Fagetea Braun-Blanquet & Vlieg (1937)
- Crithmo-limonielea Braun-Blanquet (1947)
- Asplenietea rupestris (H.M) Braun-Blanquet (1934)

Protected flora

- Tree spurge (Euphorbia dendroides)
- Prickly juniper (Juniperus oxycedrus)

Endangered animals

- barbary apes (Macaca sylvanus)
- Jackals (Canis aureus)
- Wild cats (Felis silvestris)
- Algerian hedgehogs (Erinaceus algirus)

Marine mammals of national importance

- Sperm whales (Physeter macrocephalus)
- Short-beaked common dolphins (Delphinus delphis)
- Bottlenose dolphins (Tursiops truncatus)
- Harbour porpoises (Phocoena phocoena)

== Gallery ==
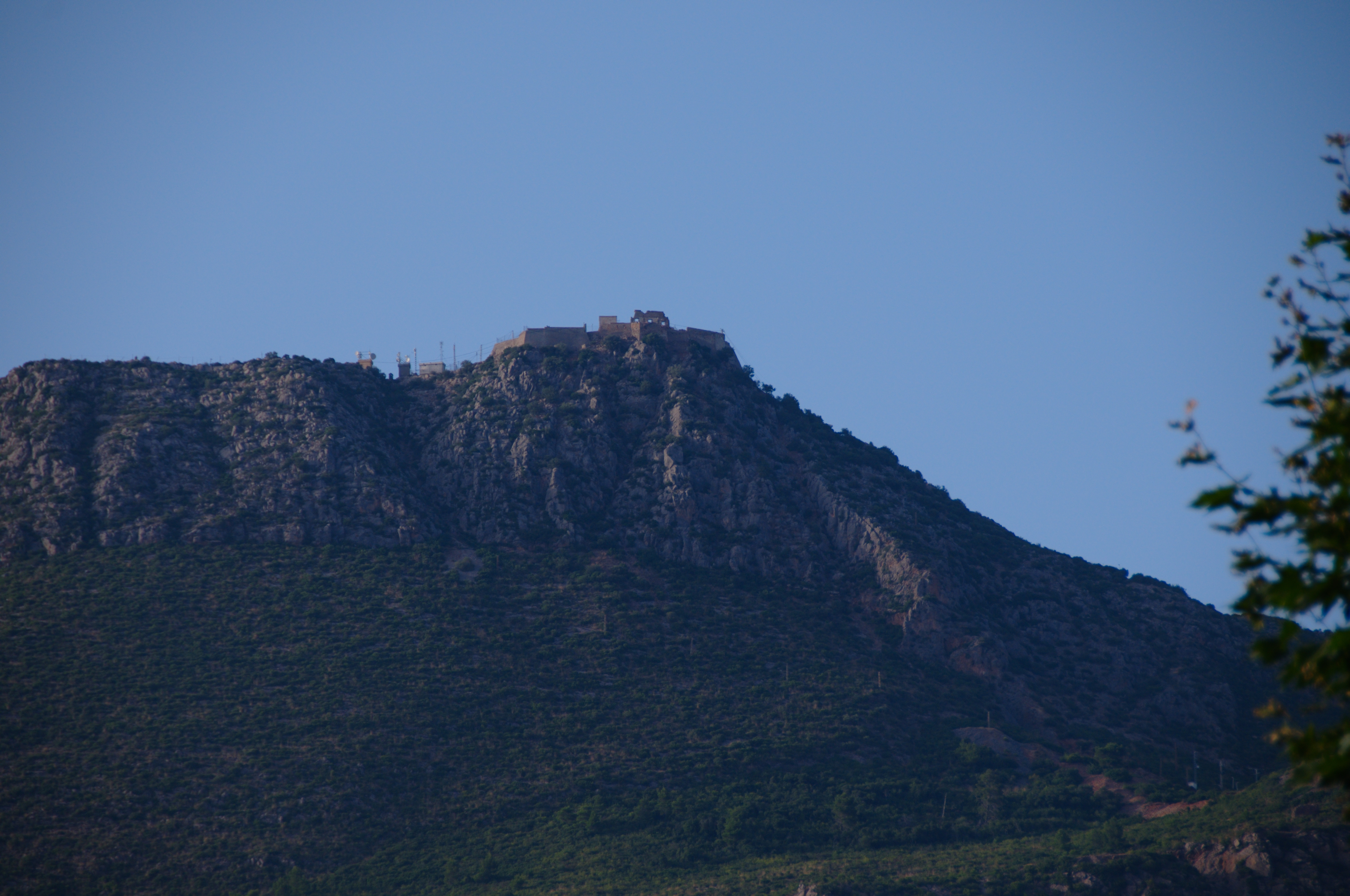
Yemma Gouraya, next to Béjaïa.

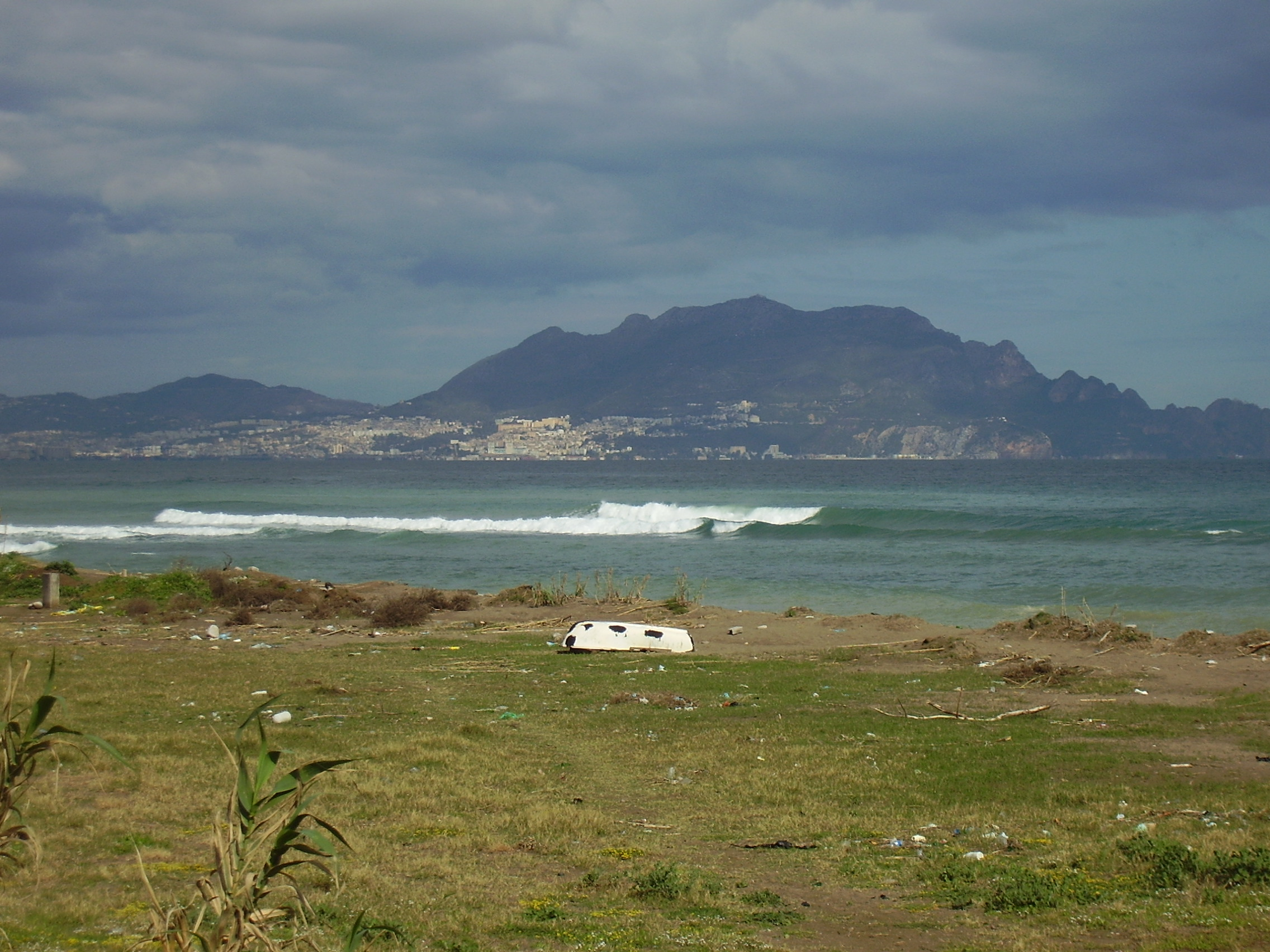
The city of Bougie at the base of Yemma Gouraya mountain.

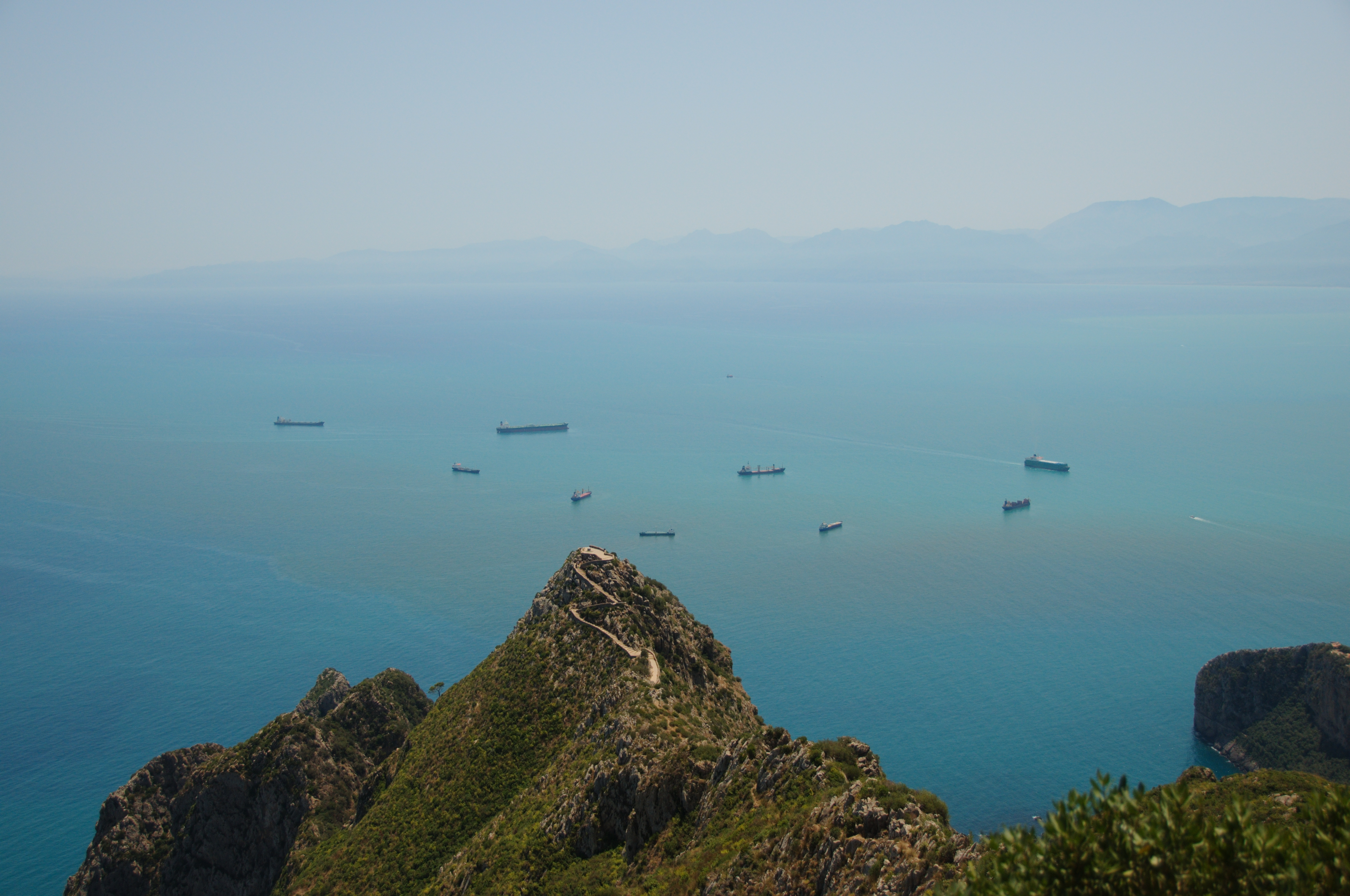
Monkeys' peak (Pic des singes), above the Cap Carbon.

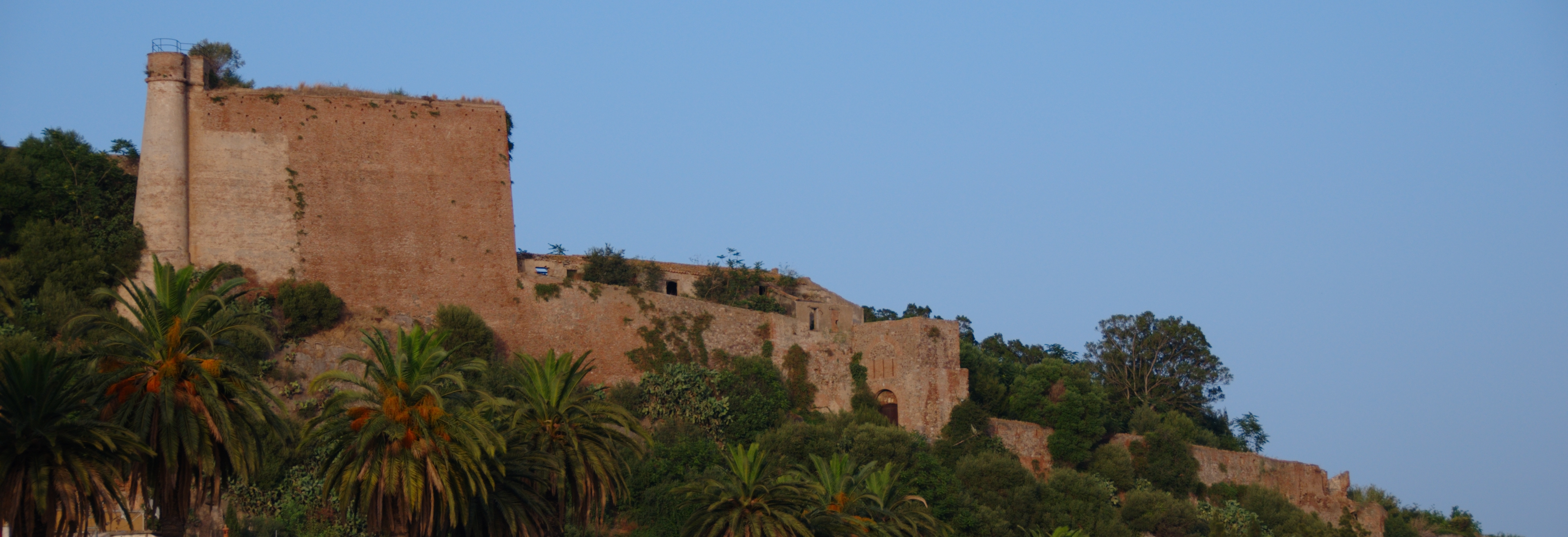
Fort Gouraya, which culminates at 672m.

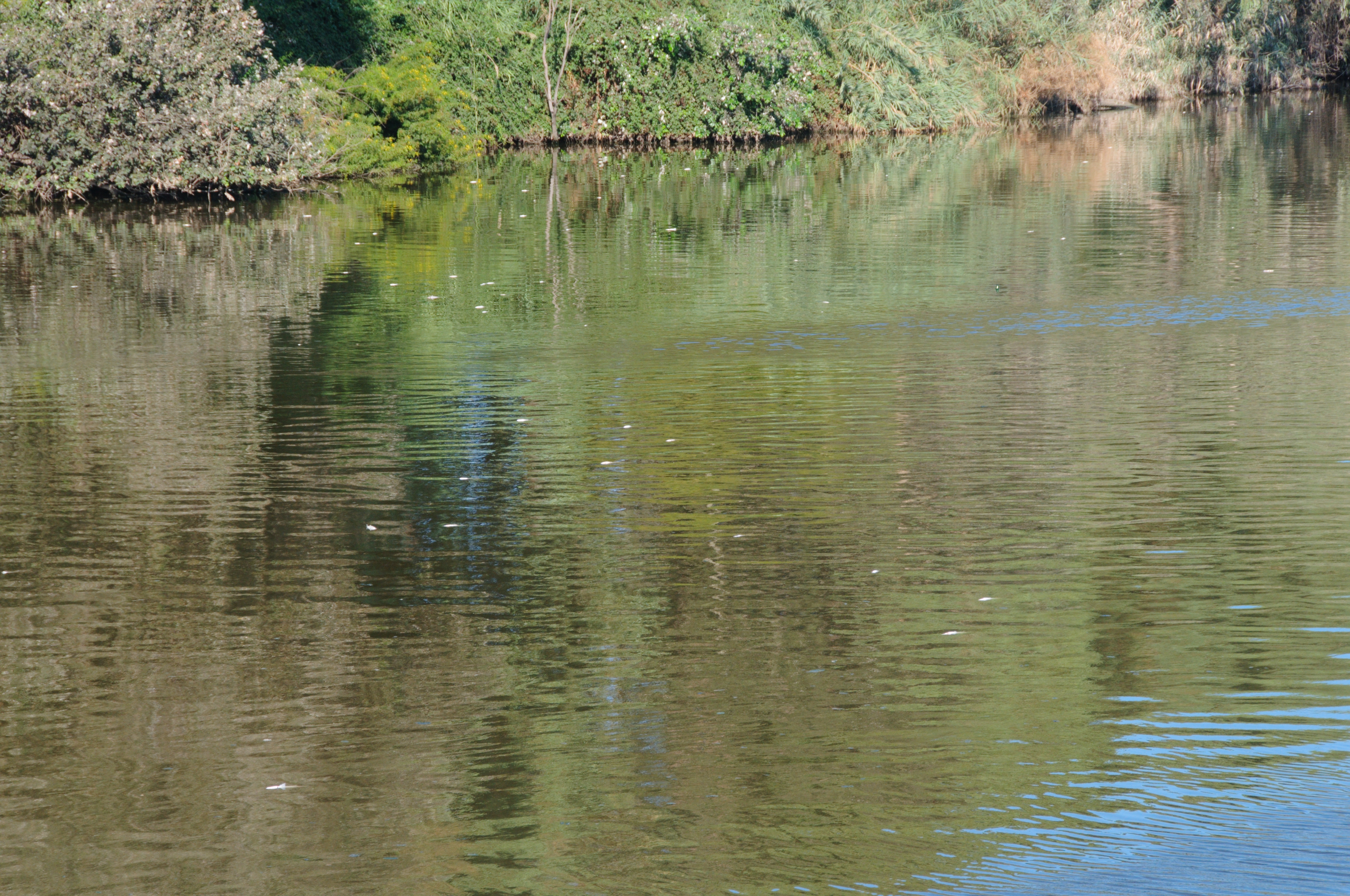
Dead fish on the river Summam, probably from pesticide pollution due to heavy rains (2008).
