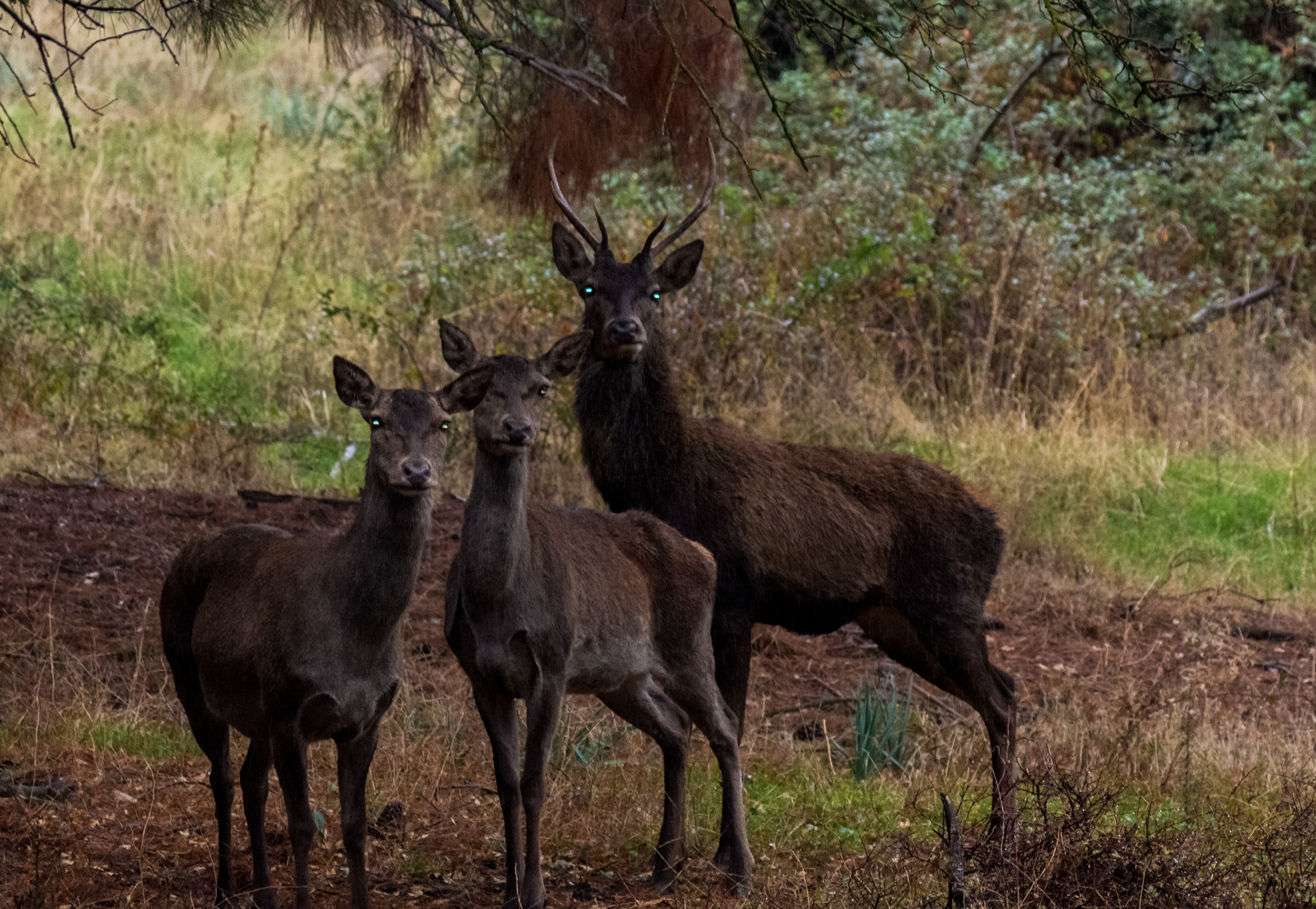
- A herd at El Feidja National Park

Conservation status
- CITES Appendix III

Scientific classification
- Kingdom: Animalia
- Phylum: Chordata
- Class: Mammalia
- Order: Artiodactyla
- Family: Cervidae
- Genus: Cervus
- Species: C. elaphus
- Subspecies: C. e. barbarus

Trinomial name
- Cervus elaphus barbarus Bennett, 1833

Synonyms
- Cervus barbarus

= Barbary stag =

Subspecies of deer

The Barbary stag (Cervus elaphus barbarus), also known as the Atlas deer or African elk, is a subspecies of the red deer that is native to North Africa. It is the only deer known to be native to Africa, aside from Megaceroides algericus, which went extinct approximately 6,000 years ago.

== Description ==
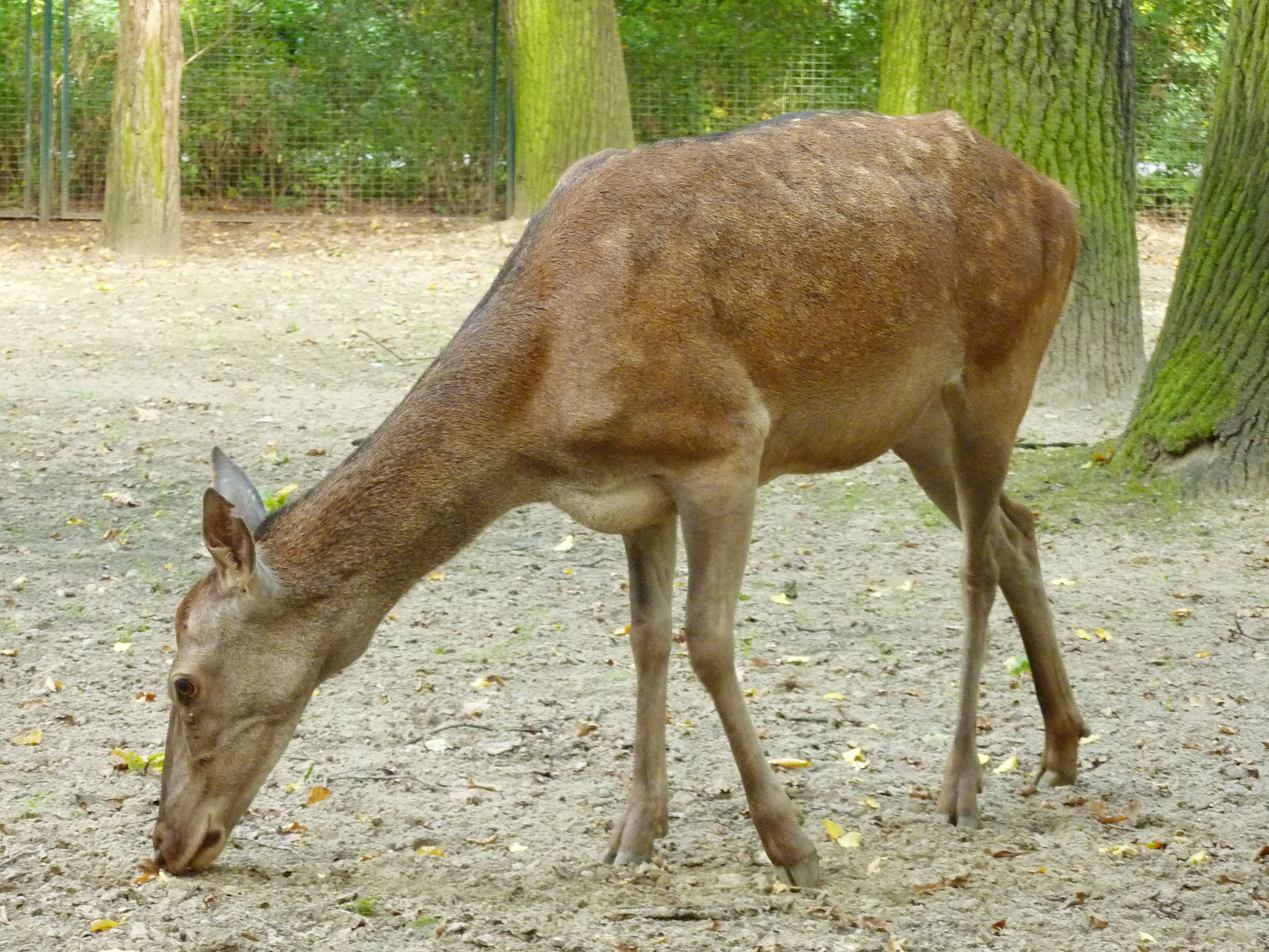
A female (hind) at Tierpark Berlin

The Barbary stag is smaller than the typical red deer. Its body is dark brown with some white spots on its flanks and back. The antlers lack the bez (second) tine.

== Range/habitat ==
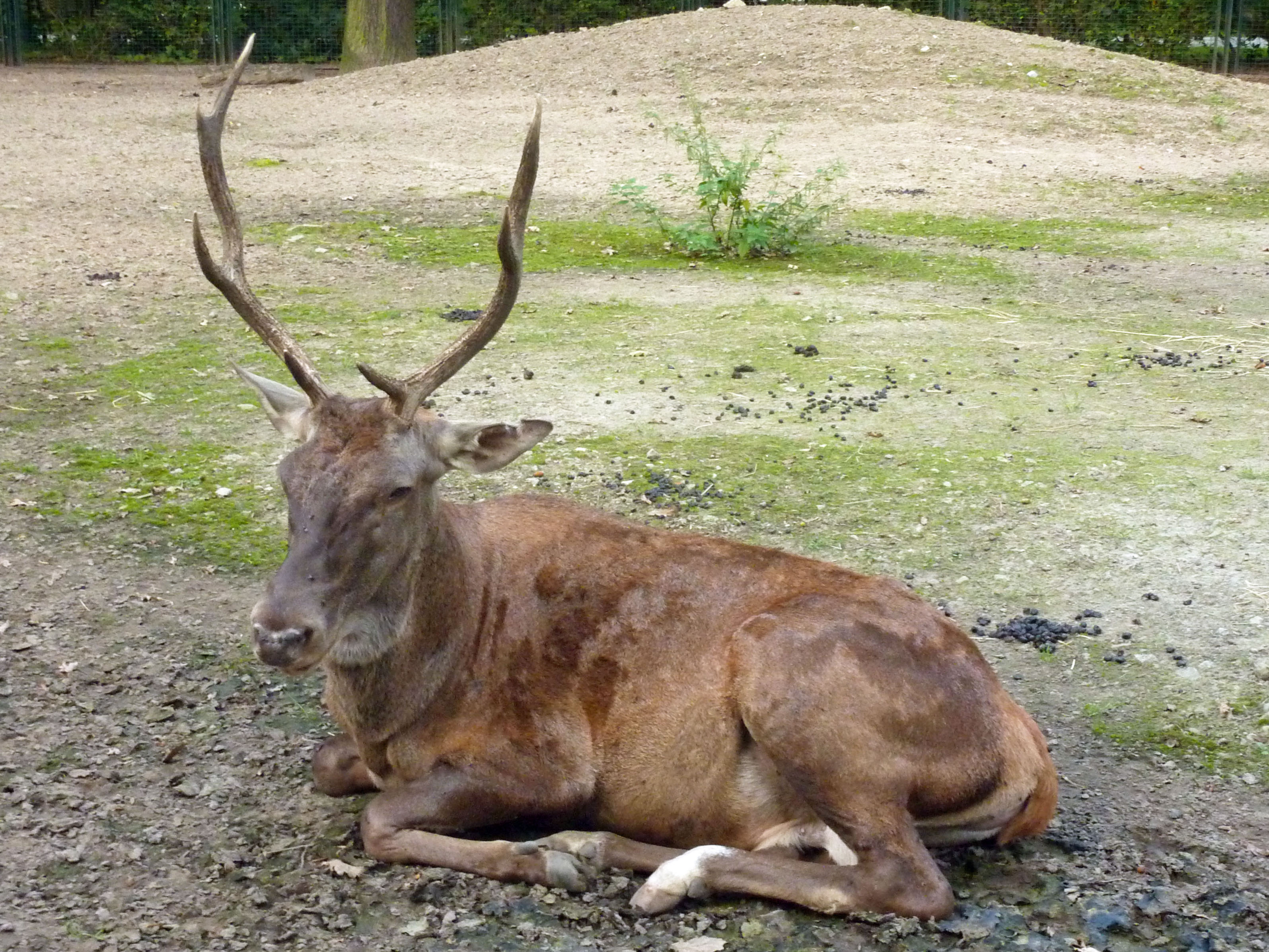
A male at Tierpark Berlin

The Barbary stag is the only member of the deer family that is native to Africa. It thrives in dense, humid forested areas of Algeria, Tunisia and Morocco. It had initially been hunted to extinction in the latter, but specimens from the Tunisian population were reintroduced in the 1990s. One population can be found in Tazekka National Park in the Middle Atlas Mountains. Other notable herds are known from the areas of Akfadou, Bouzeguène, and Zéralda, Algeria, as well as Taza Province, Morocco.

== Nomenclature ==
Recent genetic studies indicate that the North African red deer population is practically indistinguishable from the Sardinian and Corsican populations, generally referred to as the Corsican red deer. This strongly argues for an ancient introduction of red deer from North Africa to these Mediterranean islands by humans. Further analysis suggests that the Barbary stag, including the Corsican red deer, belongs to a separate species, and should be grouped under the name Cervus corsicanus.

== Predators ==
Predators of the Barbary stag include, or included, the Barbary lion, the Atlas bear, the Barbary leopard, and the African wolf, but these have become either endangered or extinct in the region where the Barbary stag occurs.
