= Lake Akfadou =

Lake in Djurdjura Mountains, Algeria

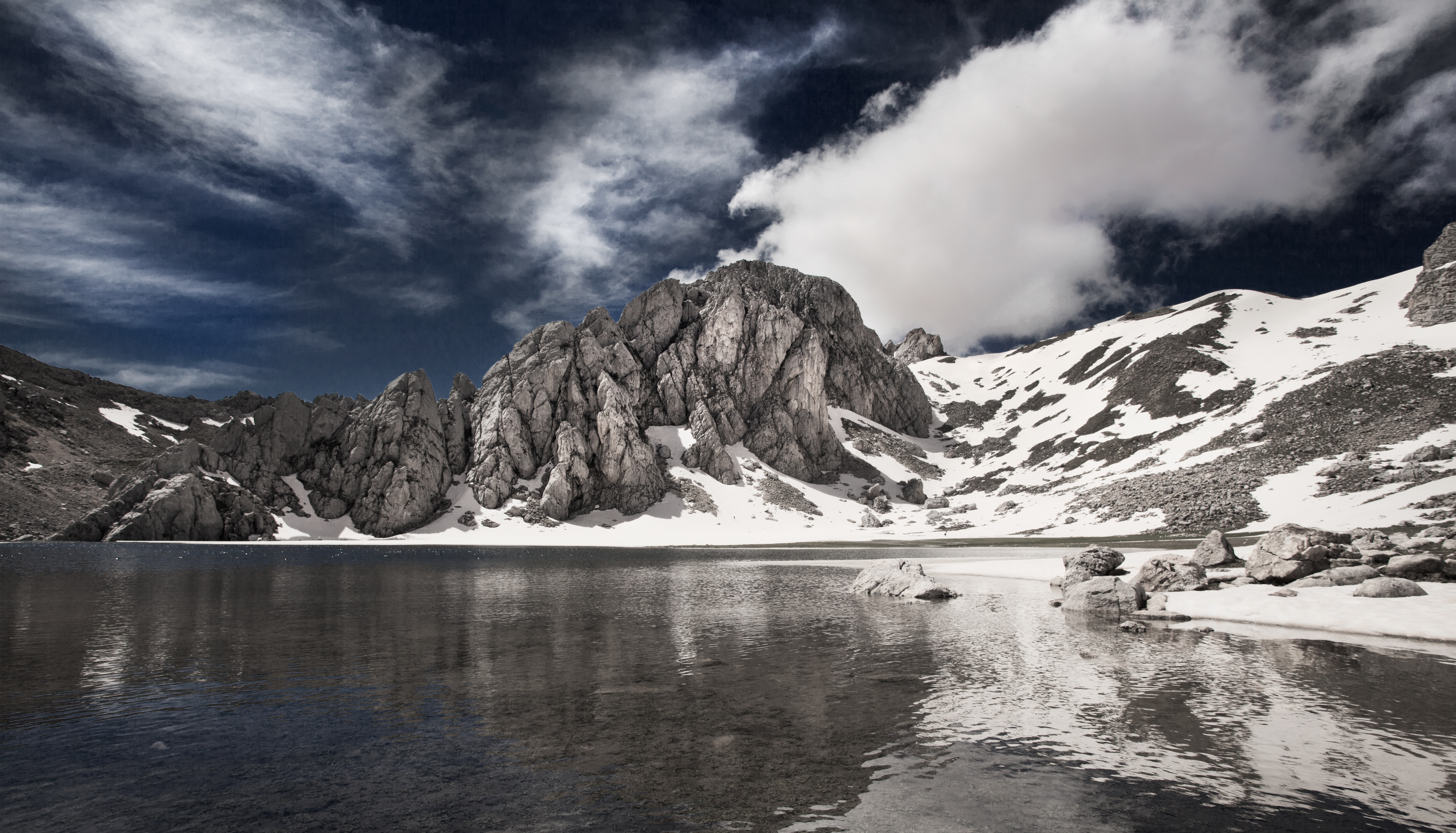
- Interactive map of Lake Akfadou
- Location: Kabylia, Algeria
- Coordinates: 36.6963711°N 4.6027409°E
- Primary inflows: Soummam River
- Basin countries: Algeria
- Settlements: Adekar District Tizi Ouzou Province – Béjaïa

Lake Akfadou, also known as Black Lake, is situated within the Djurdjura Mountains, within the boundaries of the Djurdjura National Park. It is located between the Algerian provinces of Tizi Ouzou and Béjaïa.

== Overview ==
The Black Lake, locally known in Berber as "Oqlimim Afrakan", is situated in the Akfadou Forest, in close proximity to National Road 34. It is notable for its abundance of oak trees.

Oqlimim Afrakan is situated at an altitude of 1,200 meters and is a popular destination for nature-loving tourists seeking a tranquil escape from city life.

The 3-hectare lake, with an area of 3 hectares and a depth of approximately 1 meter, reflecting a multitude of colors. These include sky blue, white from the clouds, and dark green from the oak trees that surround it from all sides.

An artificial barrier has been constructed on one side of the lake in order to maintain a specific water level. The presence of trees that have become partially submerged in the lake.

Vehicles, including cars and minibuses, are parked in the vicinity of the lake following their use in transporting tourists from neighboring states who come to picnic at its edges. Families, groups of friends, and pedestrians seek respite from the heat under the shade of trees in the area.

There are also jumping frogs that inhabit the area. A tree trunk that has fallen into the water holds a giant lizard that visitors call a "dinosaur." This is one of the myths of Oqlimim Afrakan.

The archaeological site of the village of Mahaqa, which dates back to the Roman era or an even older era, locally called "Akham Ojhali", represents an archaeological and historical curiosity whose secrets remain to be uncovered by scientists.

== Characteristics ==
01	Provinces	Tizi Ouzou and Béjaïa
02	Coordinates	36.6963711°N 4.6027409°E
03	Altitude	1,200 m (3,937 ft)
04	Length	200 m (656 ft)
05	Width	150 m (492 feet)
06	Area	3 ha (7.413 acres)
07	Depth	1 m (39 inches)

== Ecological diversity ==
=== Trees ===
A diverse array of arboreal species flourishes in the vicinity of Lake Akfadou.

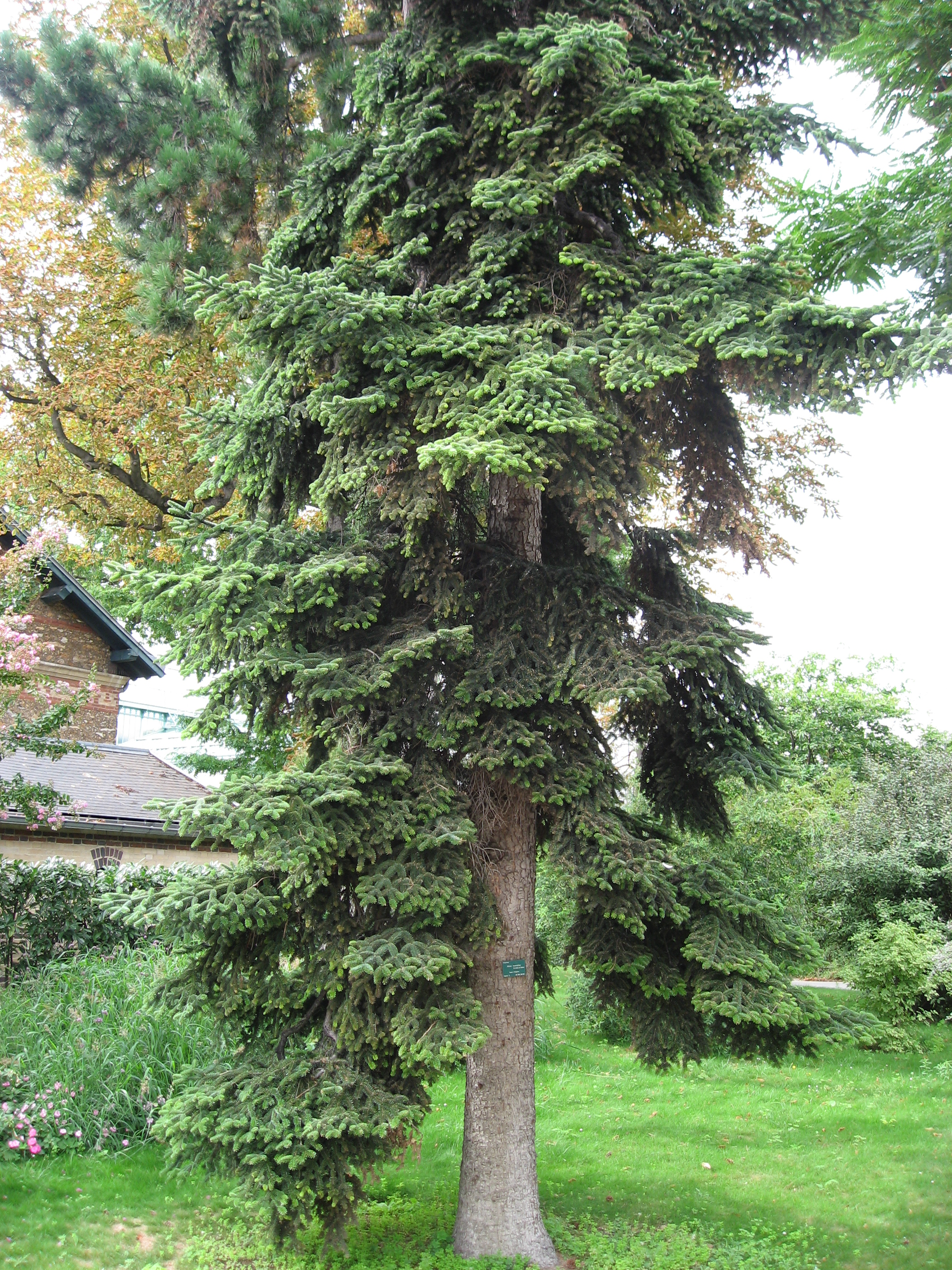
Abies numidica

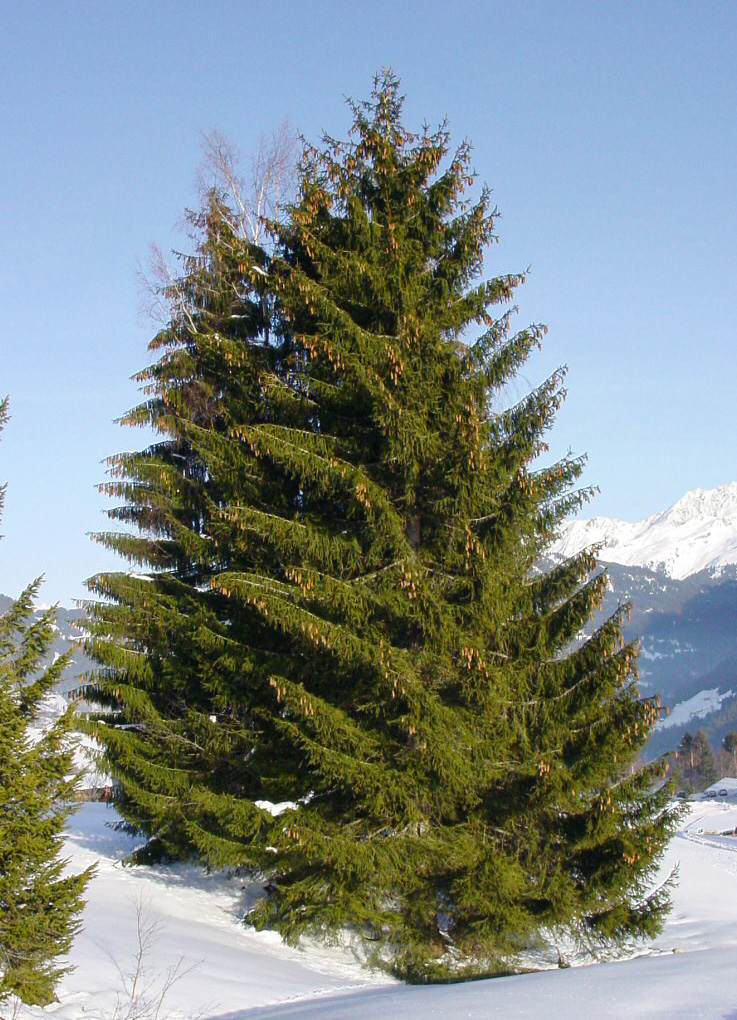
Fir

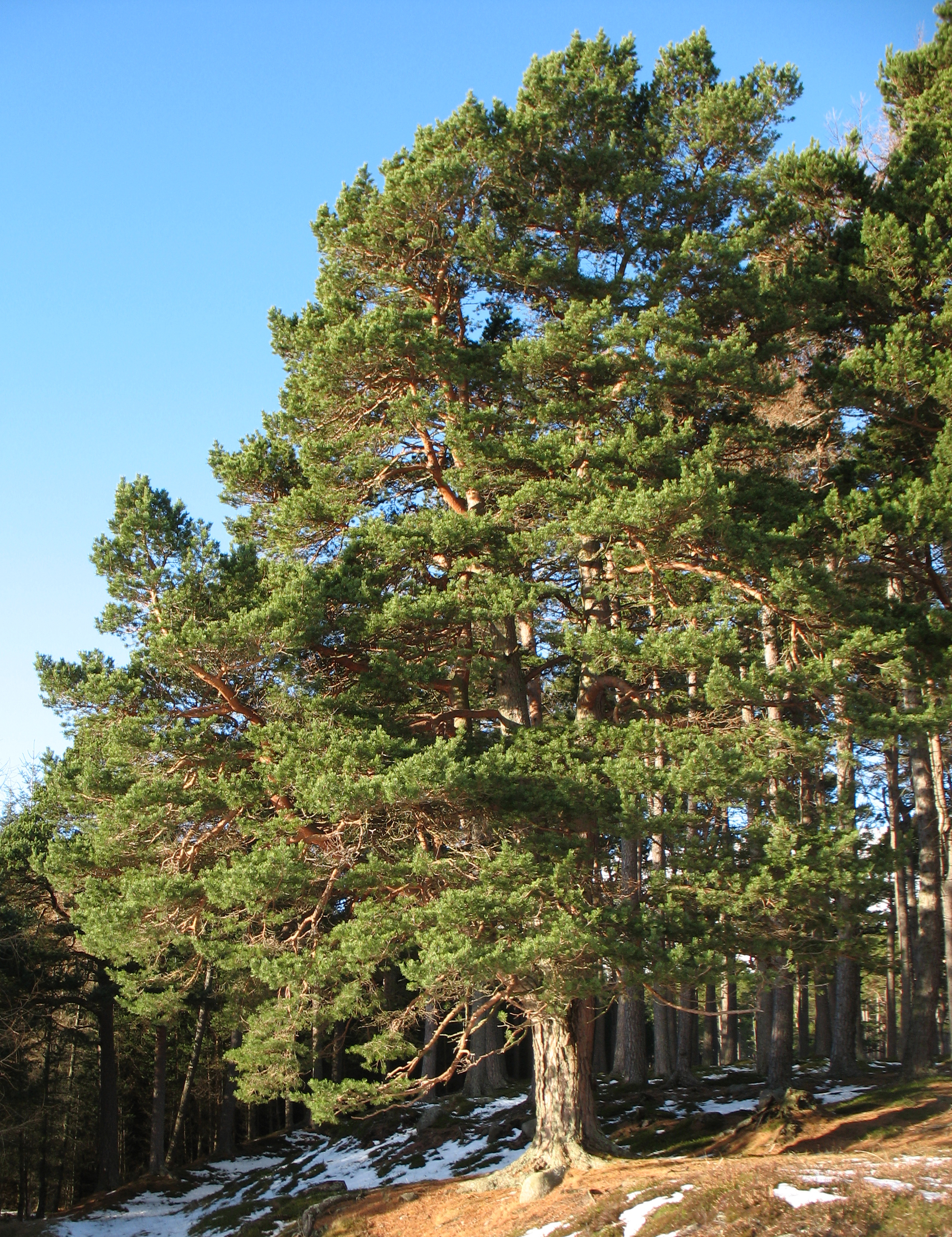
Pinus sylvestris

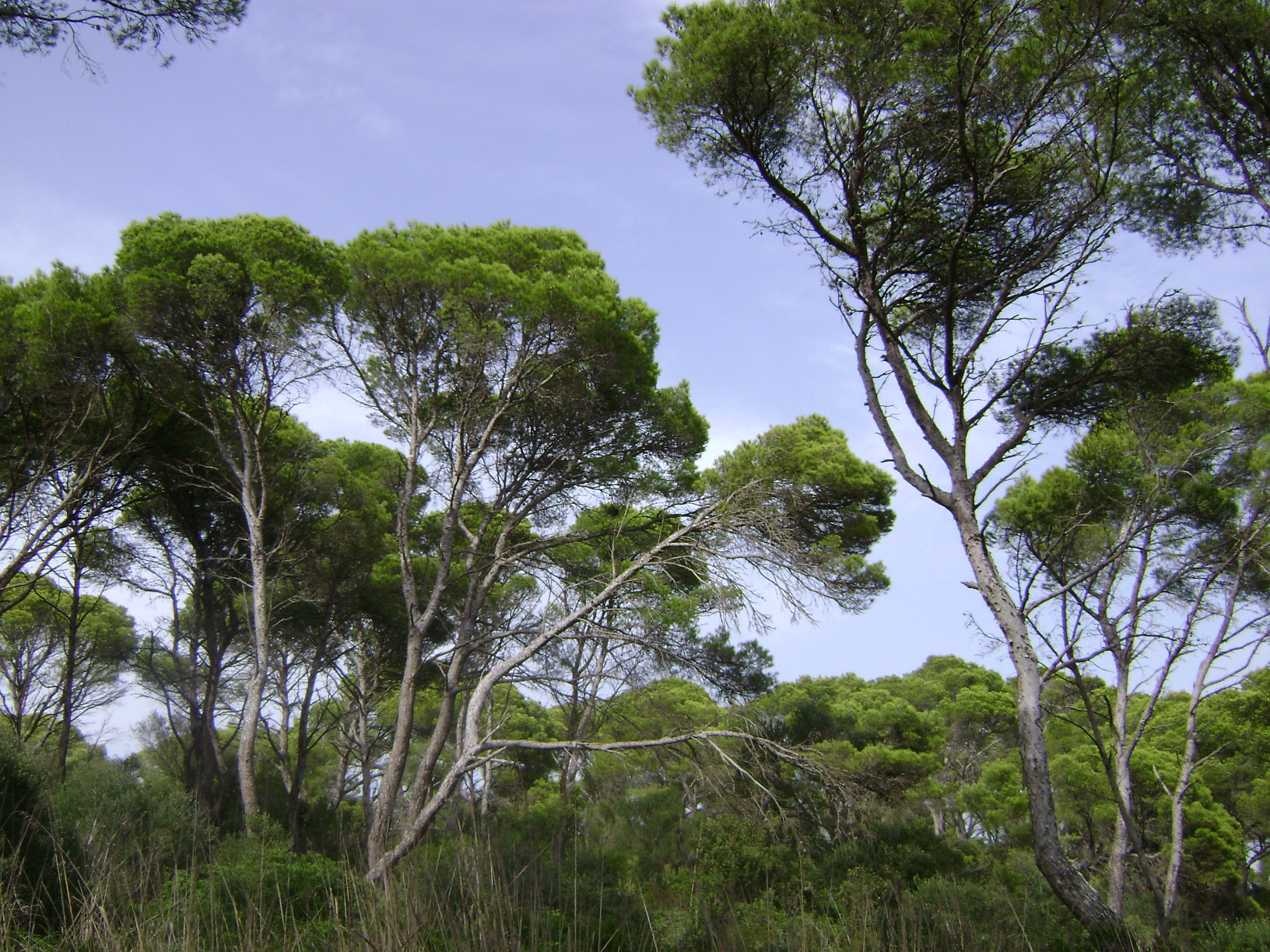
Pinus halepensis

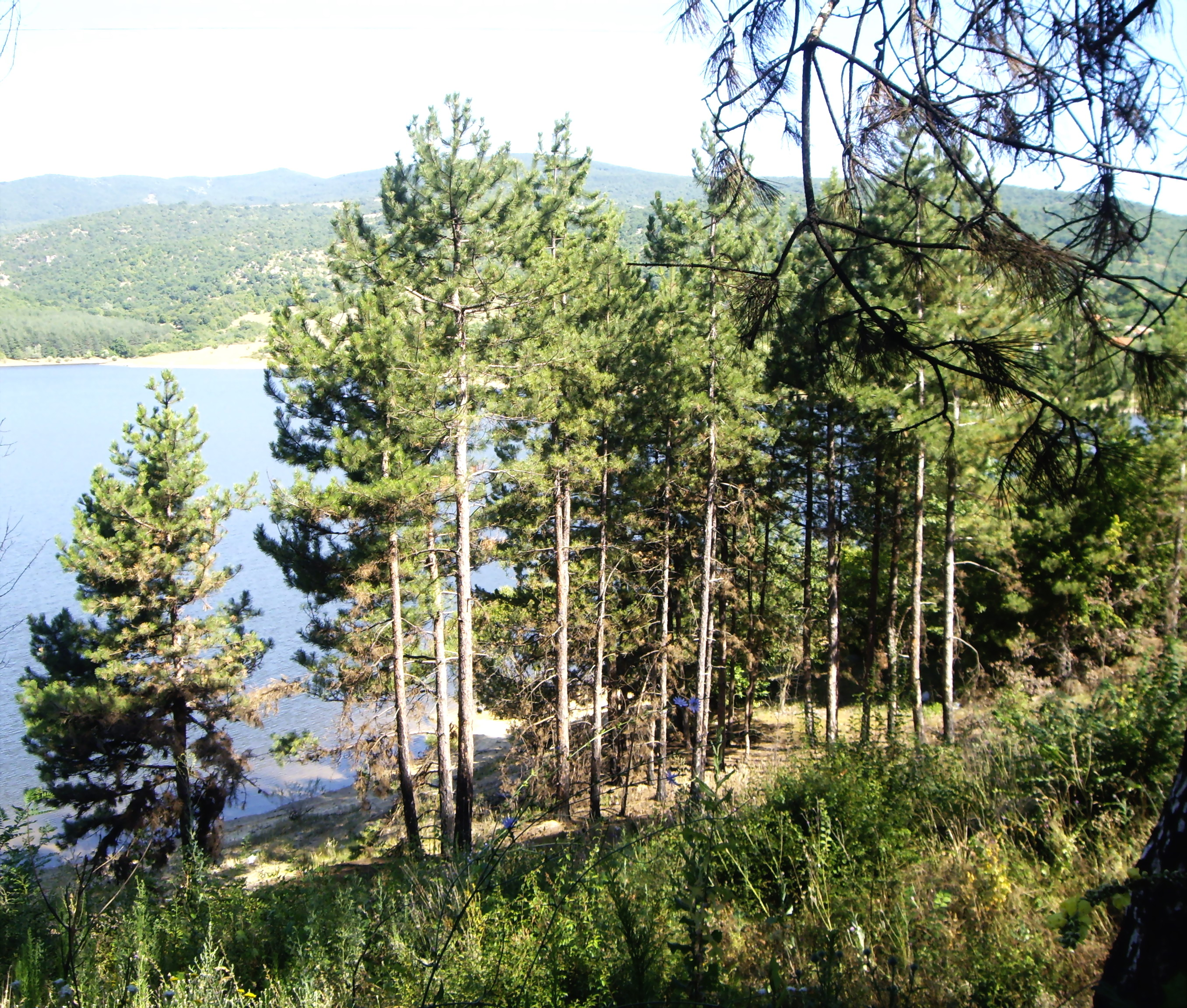
Pinus nigra

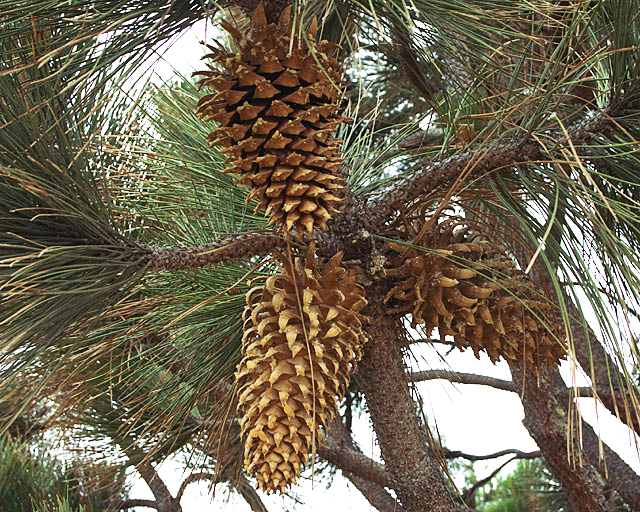
Coultry pine

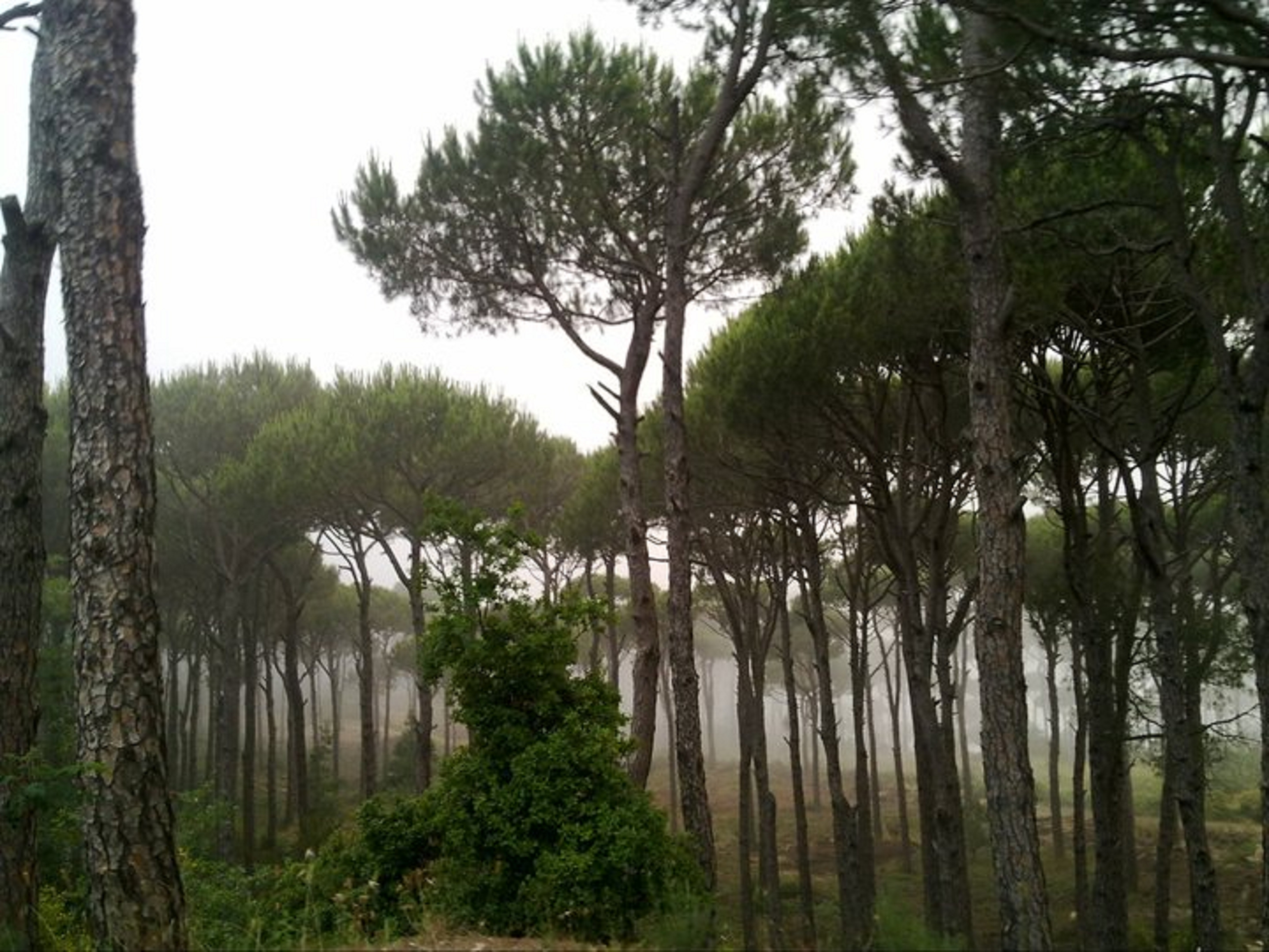
Stone pine

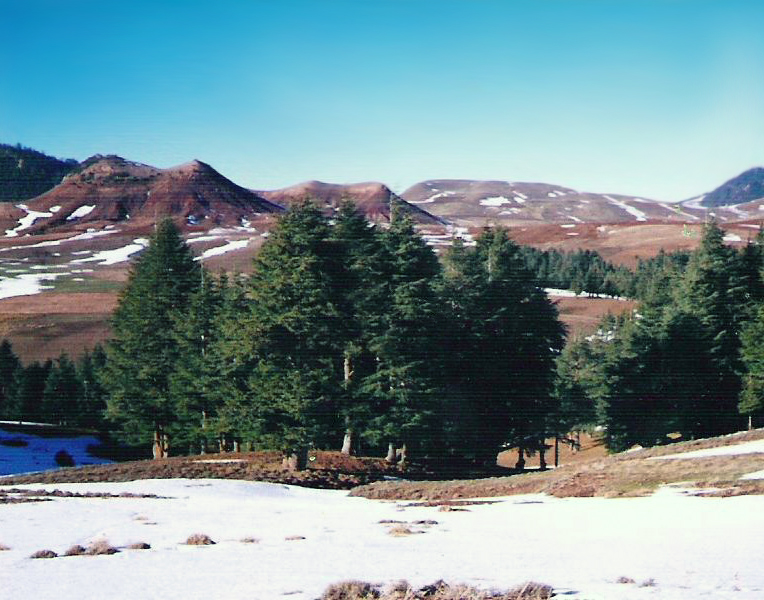
Cedrus atlantica

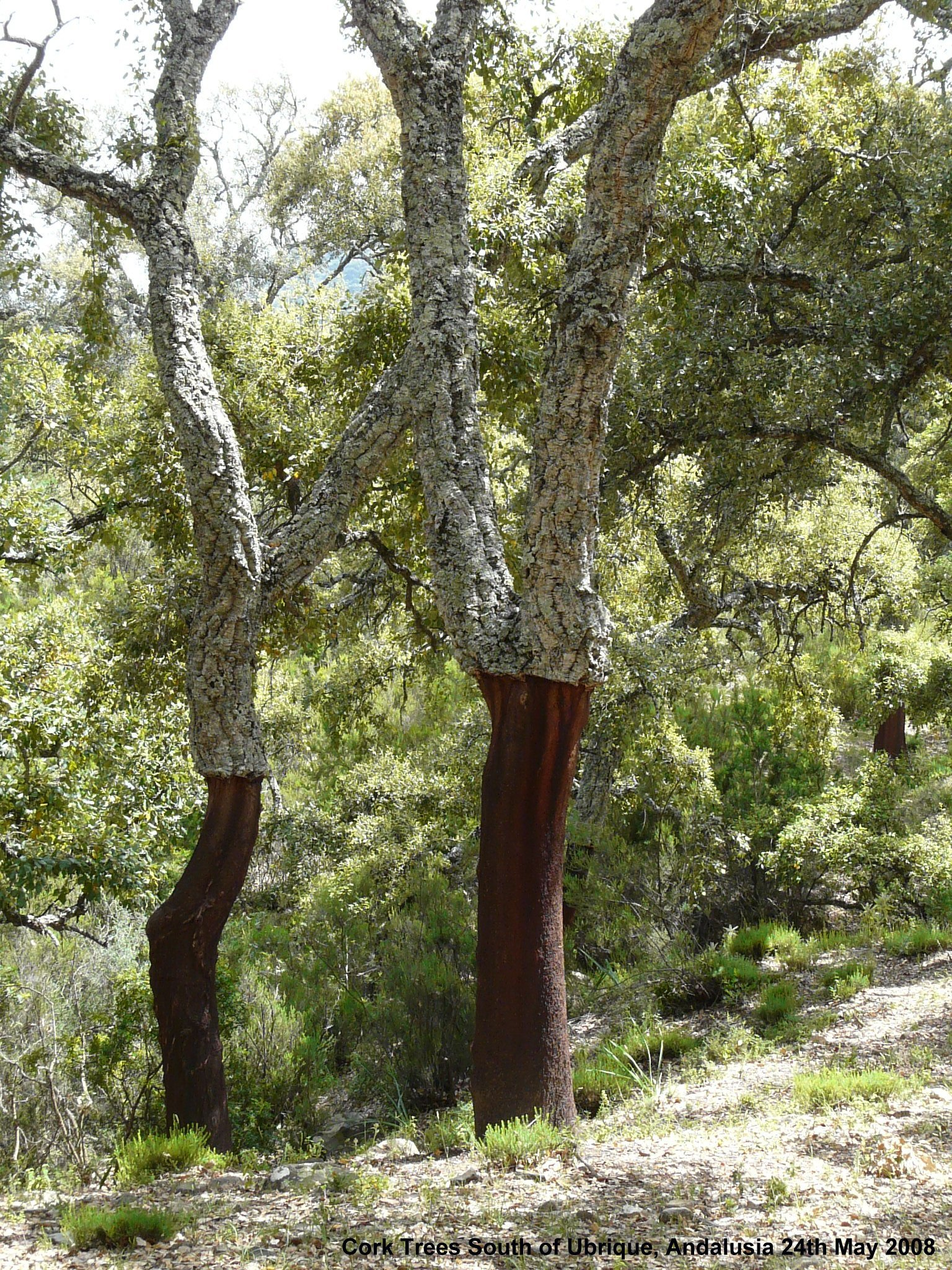
Quercus suber

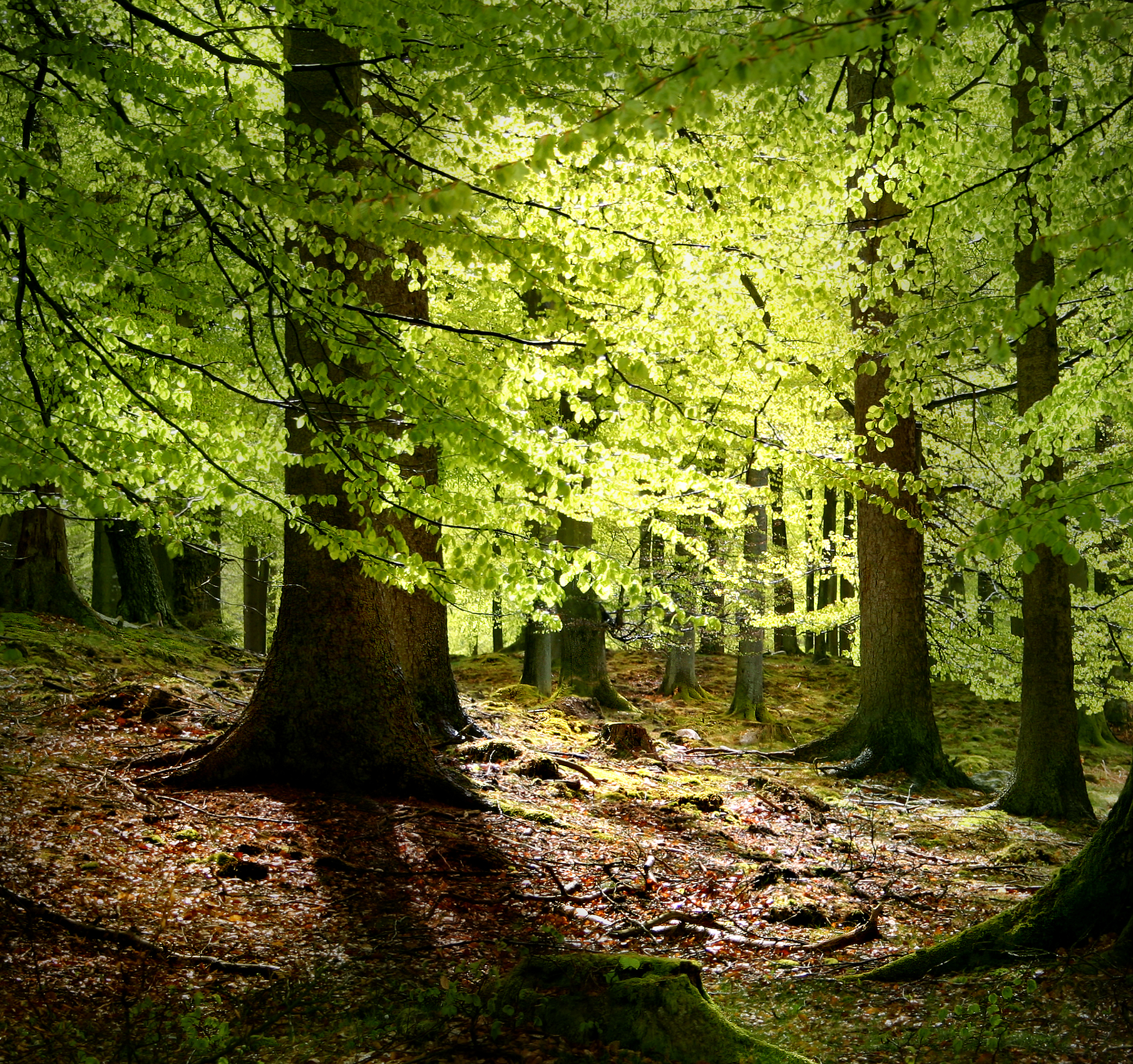
Fagus sylvatica

=== Barbary stag ===
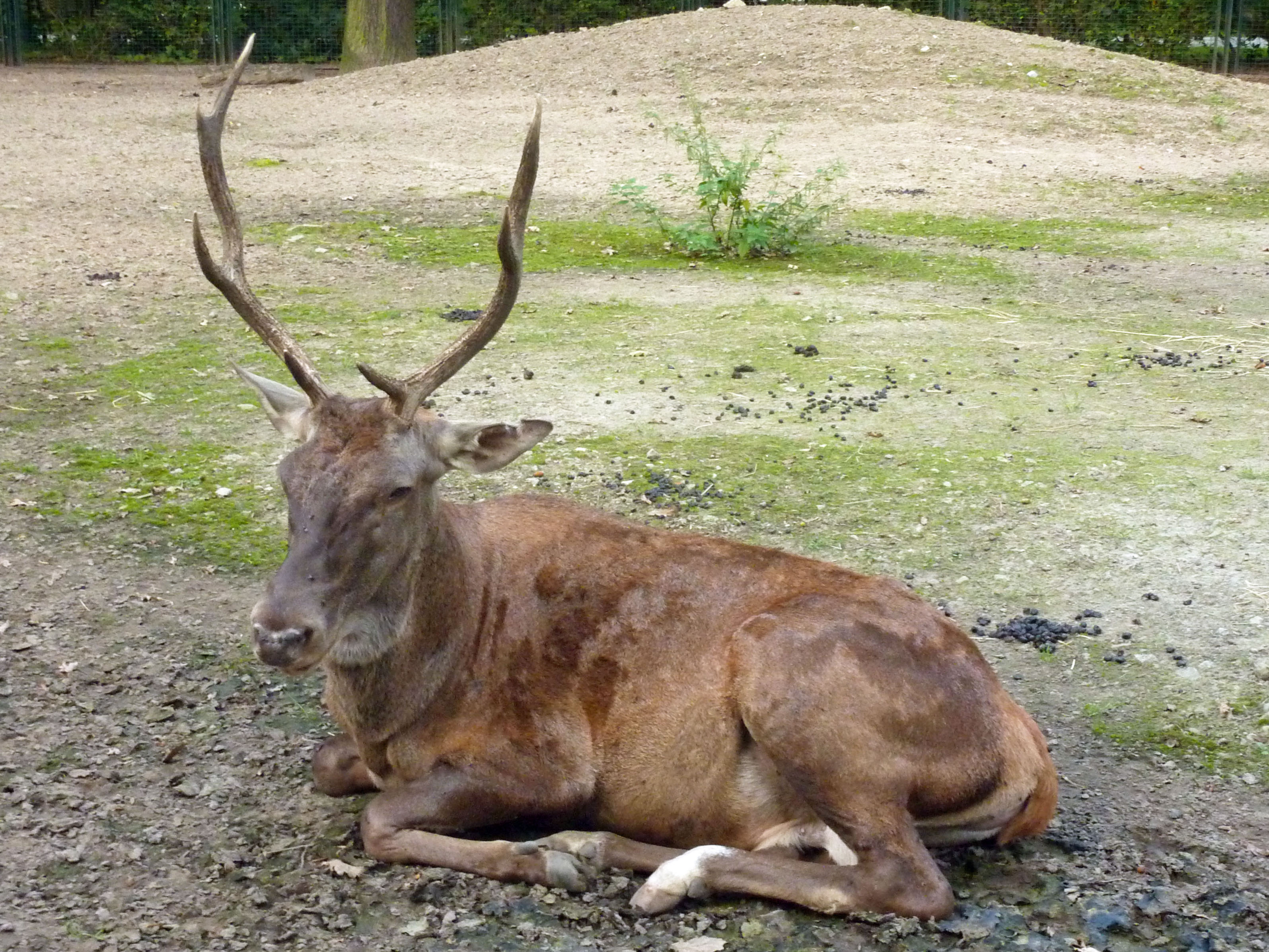
Barbary stag

The Barbary stag or Atlas stag is endemic to the Akvado region, situated in proximity to Black Lake. It is distinguished by its diminutive physique and a coat of dark brown hue, marked by the presence of white markings on the dorsal surface. It is the sole member of the stag group endemic to Algeria, exhibiting a preference for dense, humid habitats and forests reminiscent of the Akvado Highlands. The species was considered endangered due to hunting for its meat, skin, and sale of its horns, which contributed to a significant decline in its population until it was nearly extinct in 2004.

The initiative to reintroduce the Barbary stag to Algeria commenced with the relocation of a pair of Barbary deer and their offspring by the Algerian Forestry Department in collaboration with the Center for the Development of Hunting in Zeralda, situated in the Taras region at an elevated altitude within the Zeitouna municipality. The reintroduction site encompasses an area of approximately fifty hectares.

The deer was subjected to predation by a number of species, including the Barbary lion, the African leopard, and the Atlas bear. The latter is now extinct, the former is extinct in the wild, and the former is critically endangered.

The Barbary stag is a herbivorous species that feeds on fruits and vegetables. It inhabits oak and cork forests. The gestation period is approximately eight months, with parturition occurring between April and June.

In recent years, Algeria has initiated measures to facilitate the reintroduction of this species. These include the establishment of the Zeralda Fisheries Center, which is responsible for monitoring and enhancing their living conditions, with the aim of preventing extinction. Additionally, a reserve has been designated for the purpose of studying the Barbary stag, and four stags have been sourced from various zoos and four others from the Mascara and El Kalaa reserves. Subsequently, she has produced approximately 21 individuals, some of which have been utilized for the reintroduction of deer into the Akfadou Forest, her natural habitat. The outcomes have been encouraging, as evidenced by the birth of three %100/100 wild calves.

=== Barbary macaque ===
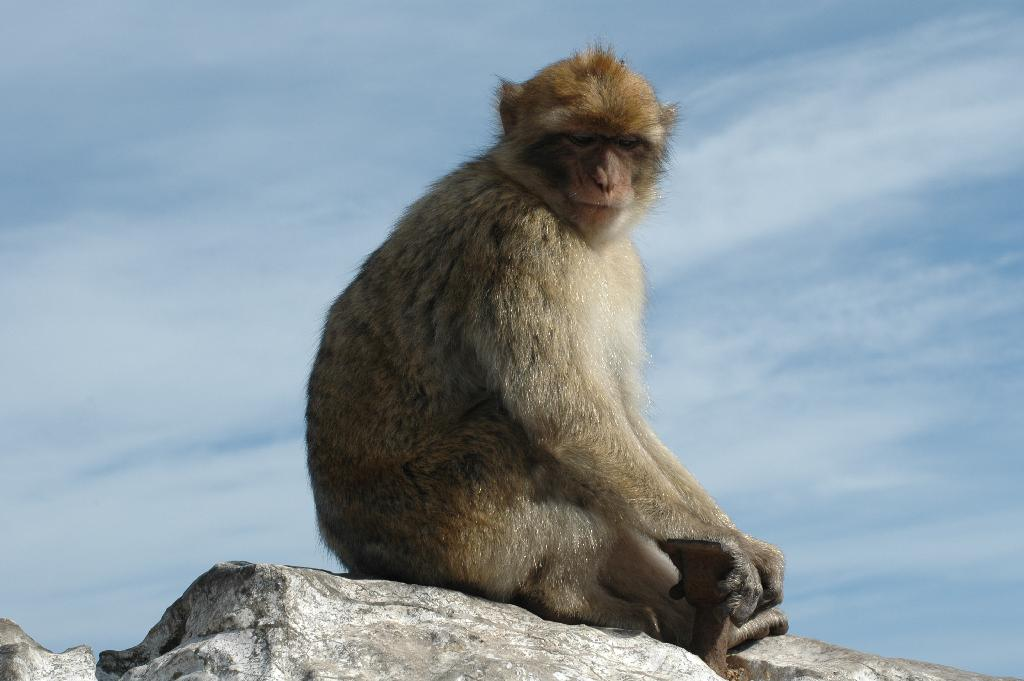
Barbary Macaque

The Barbary macaque is a species that inhabits the vicinity of Black Lake. It has been observed to venture into roads and populated areas in search of food. In response to the threat posed to this species, the Algerian government has implemented a series of measures aimed at safeguarding its survival. These include the installation of signage in areas where the animal is particularly prevalent, discouraging the feeding of maguey and prohibiting its breeding. This is due to the fact that certain foods provided to the monkeys can prove fatal. Additionally, the Algerian government has initiated the establishment of several nature reserves where significant populations of the species are located, including the Taza National Park and the Goraya National Park overlooking the Bay of Béjaïa, as well as the Djurdjura National Park.

=== Other mammals ===
Twenty-two species of mammals are observed to congregate at Akfadou's Black Lake for the purpose of obtaining sustenance.

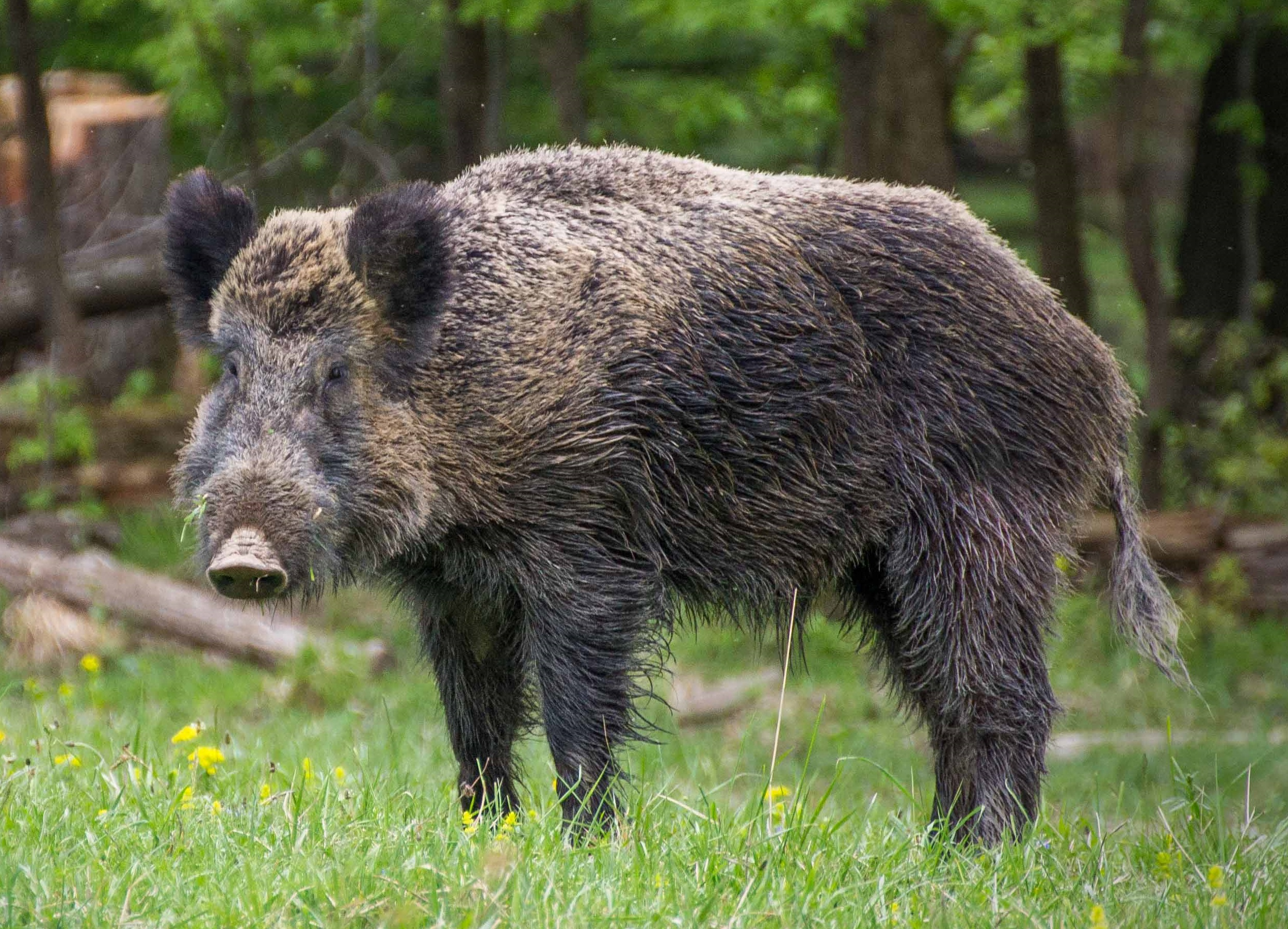
Wild boar

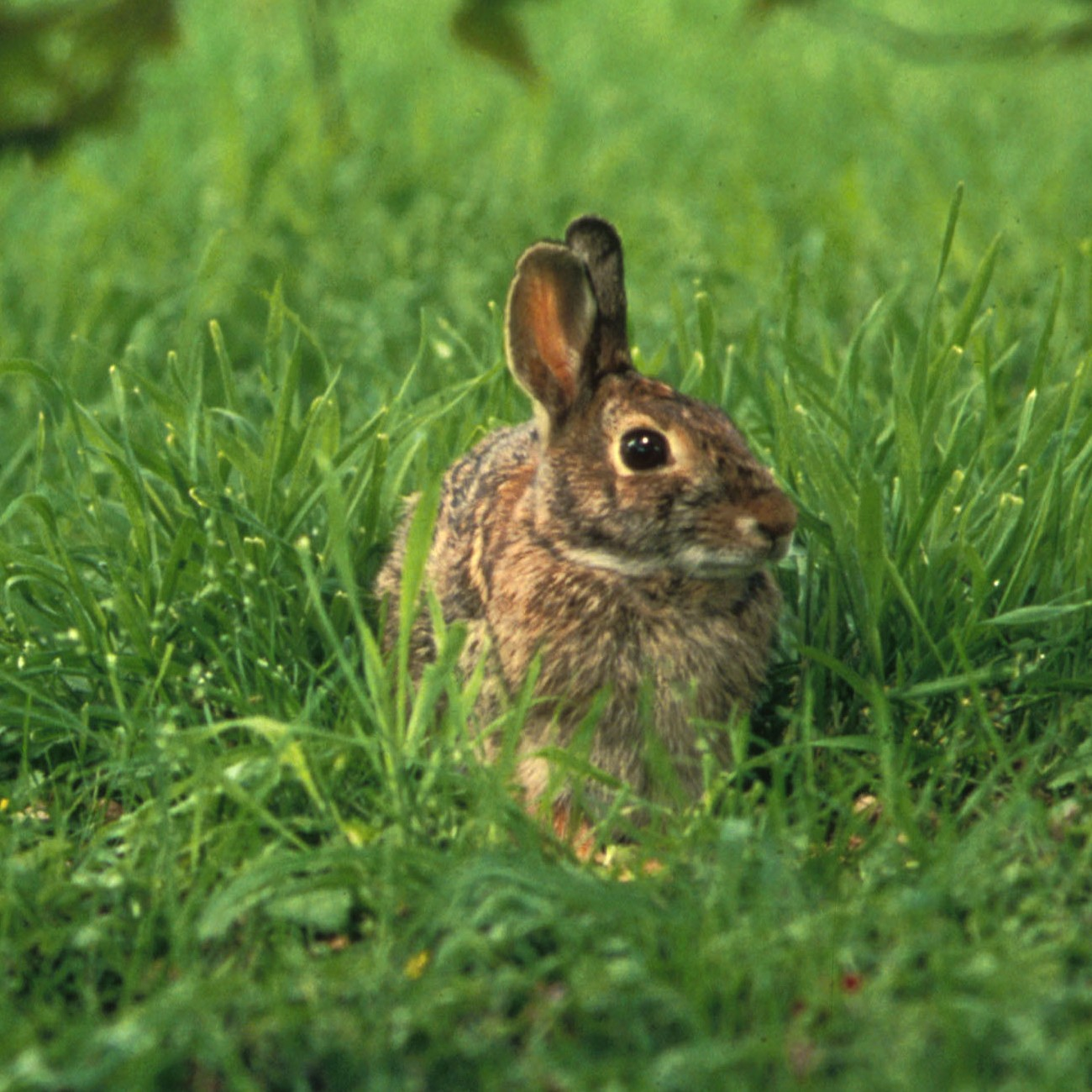
Rabbit

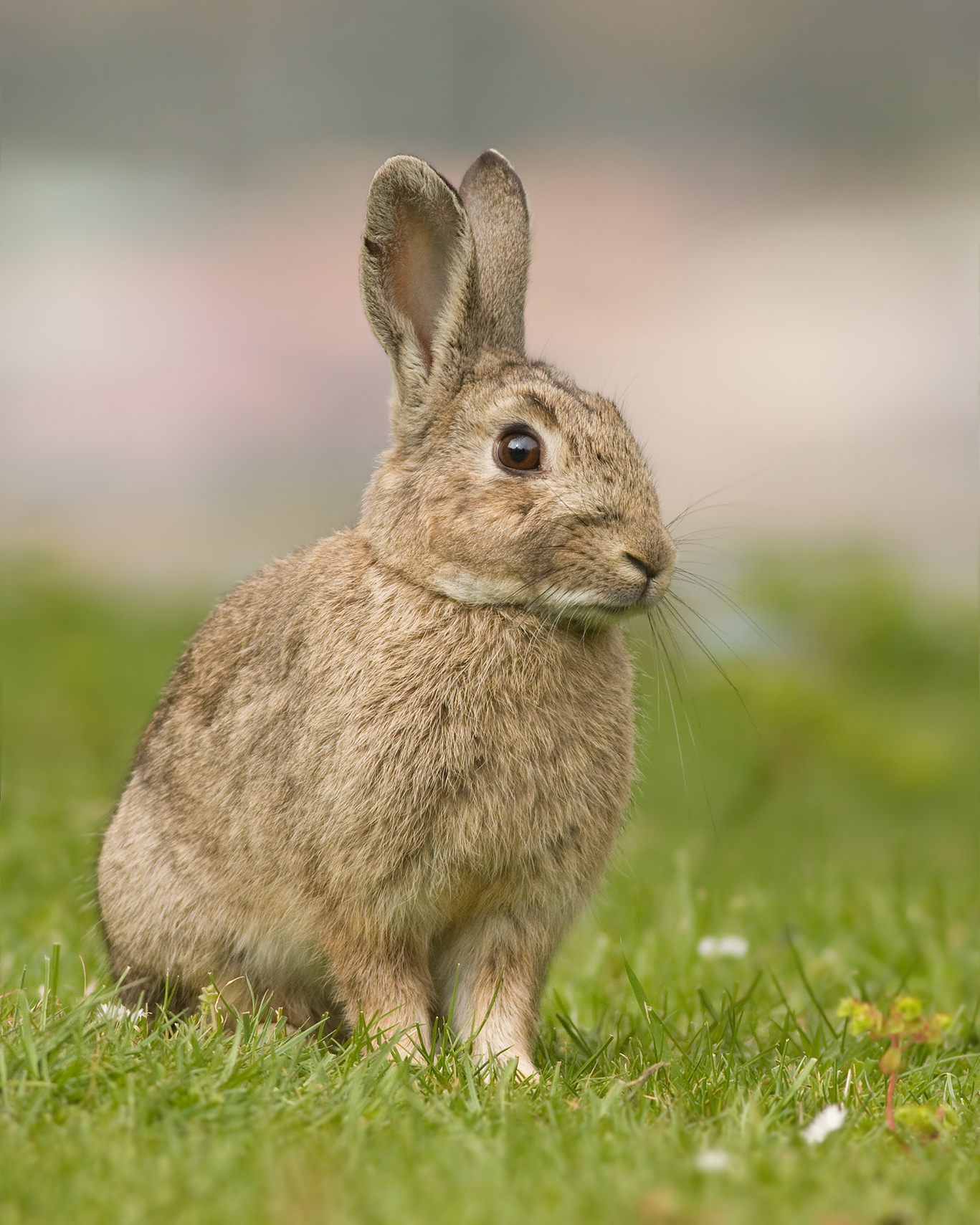
European rabbit

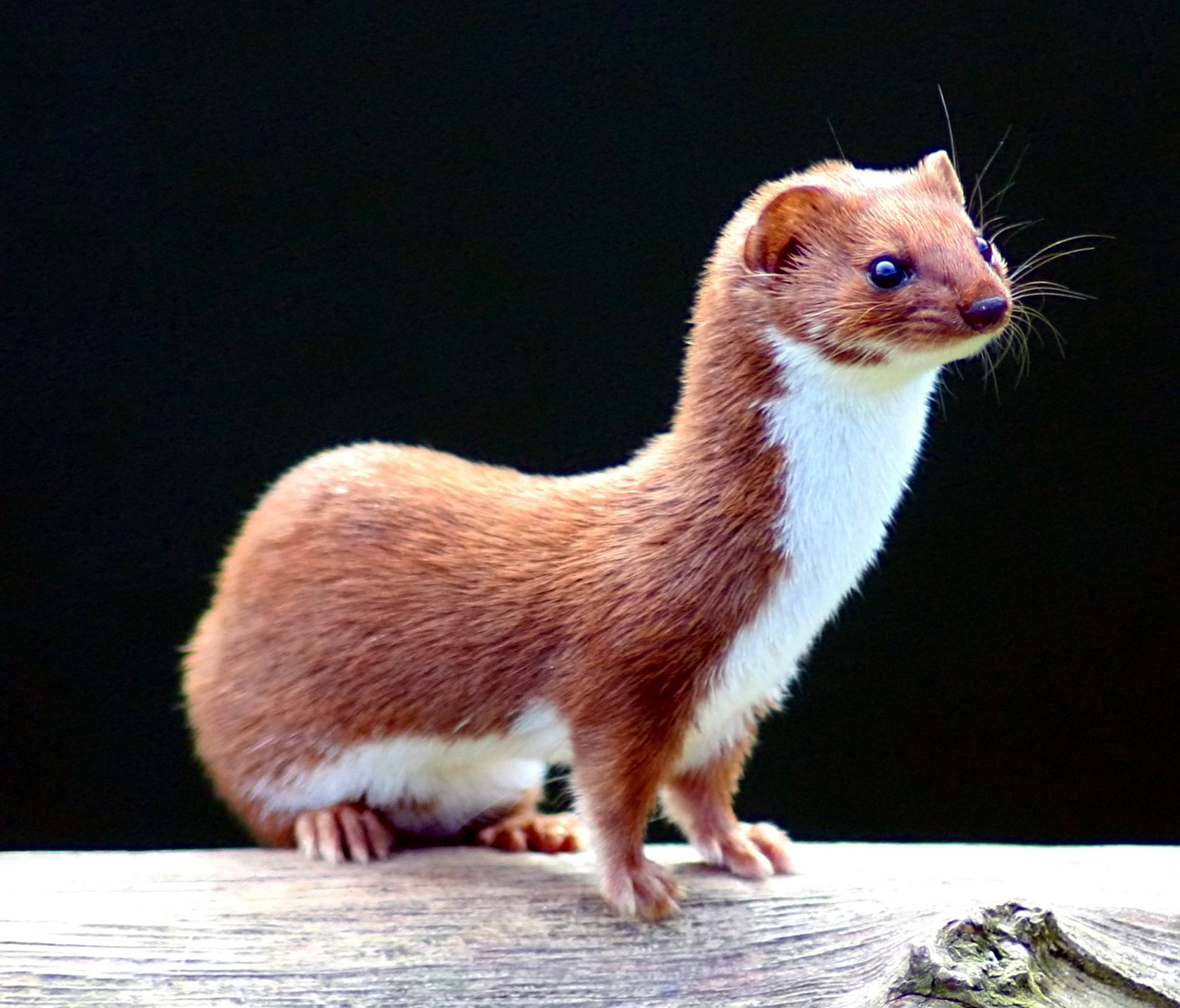
Least weasel

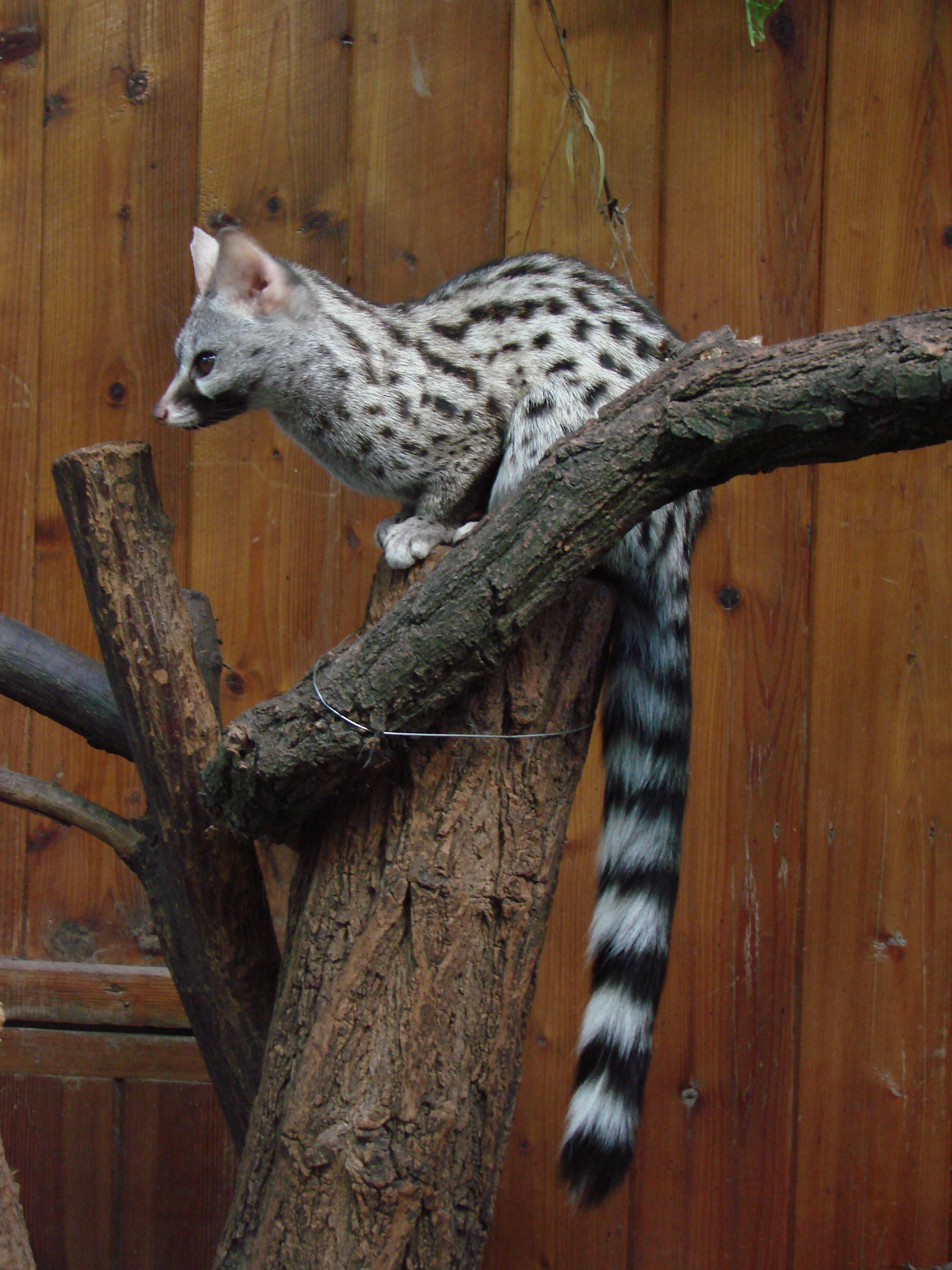
Common genet

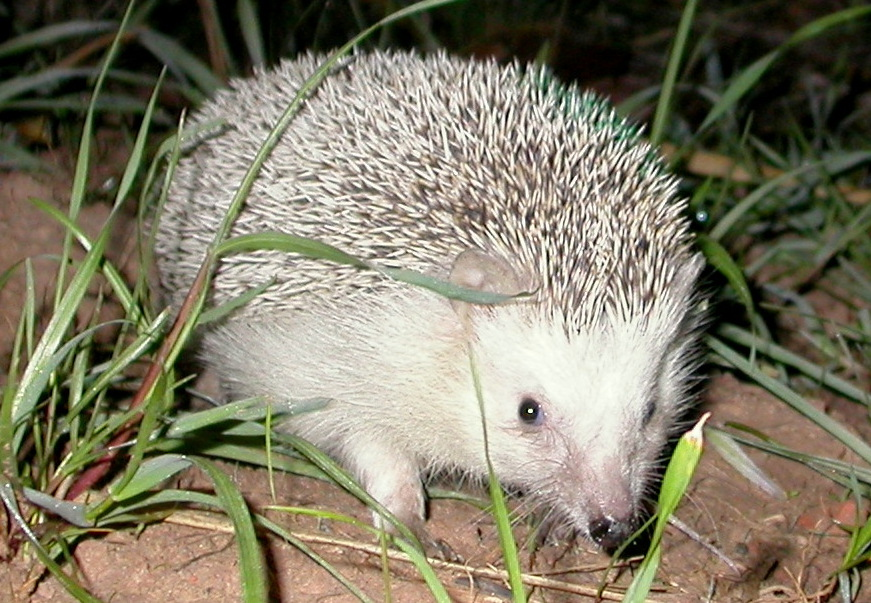
North African hedgehog

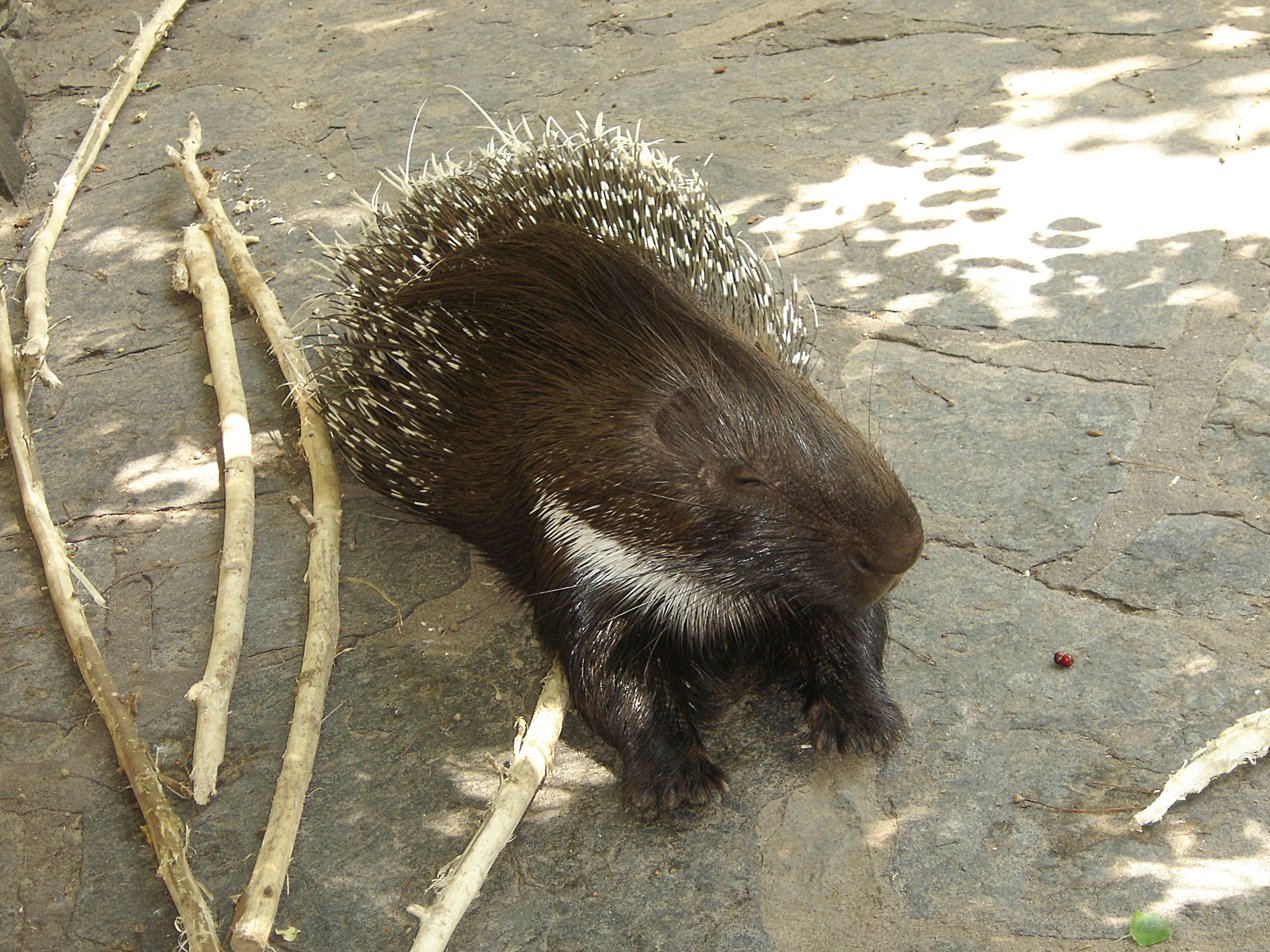
Porcupine

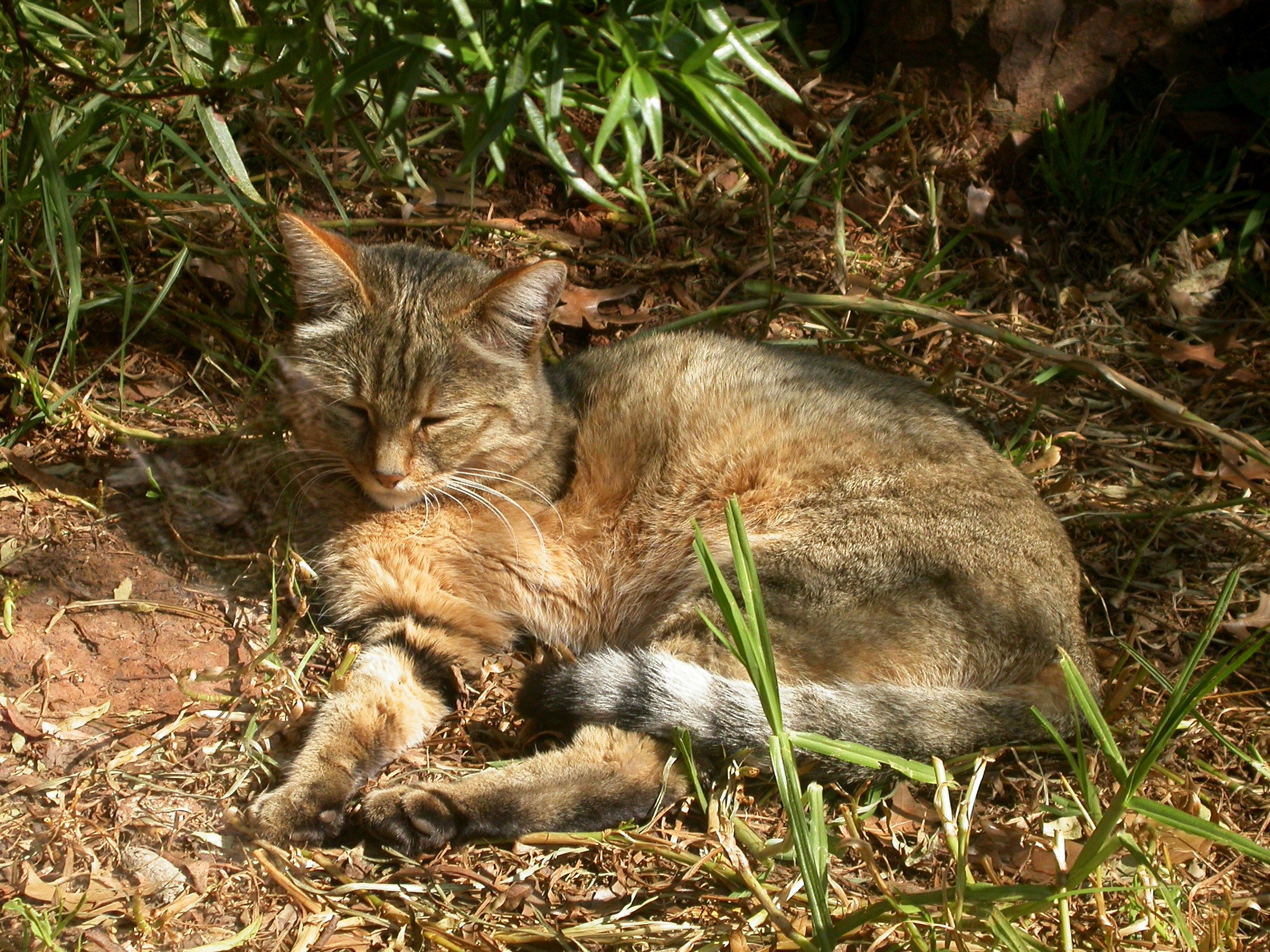
Wildcat

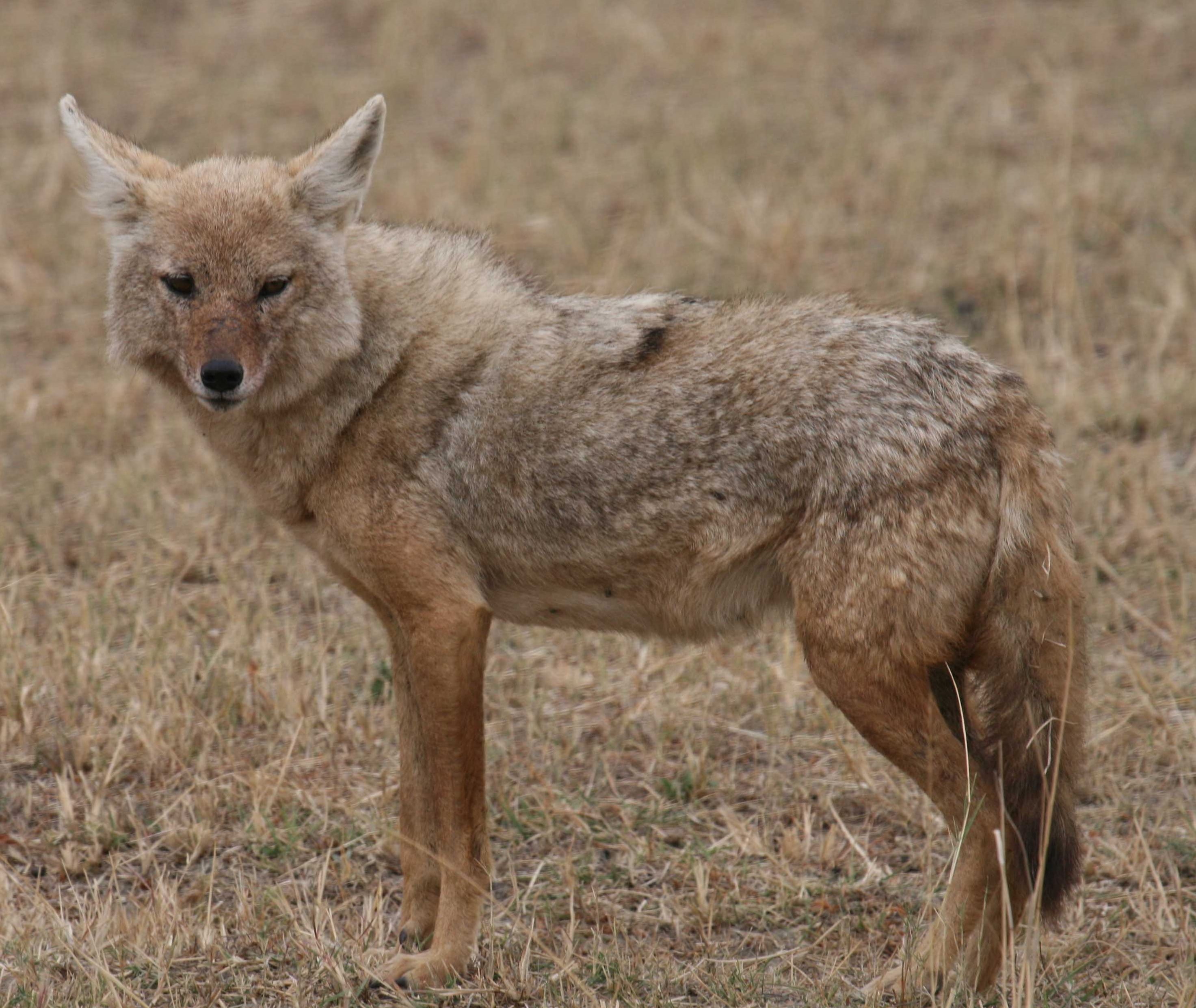
African wolf

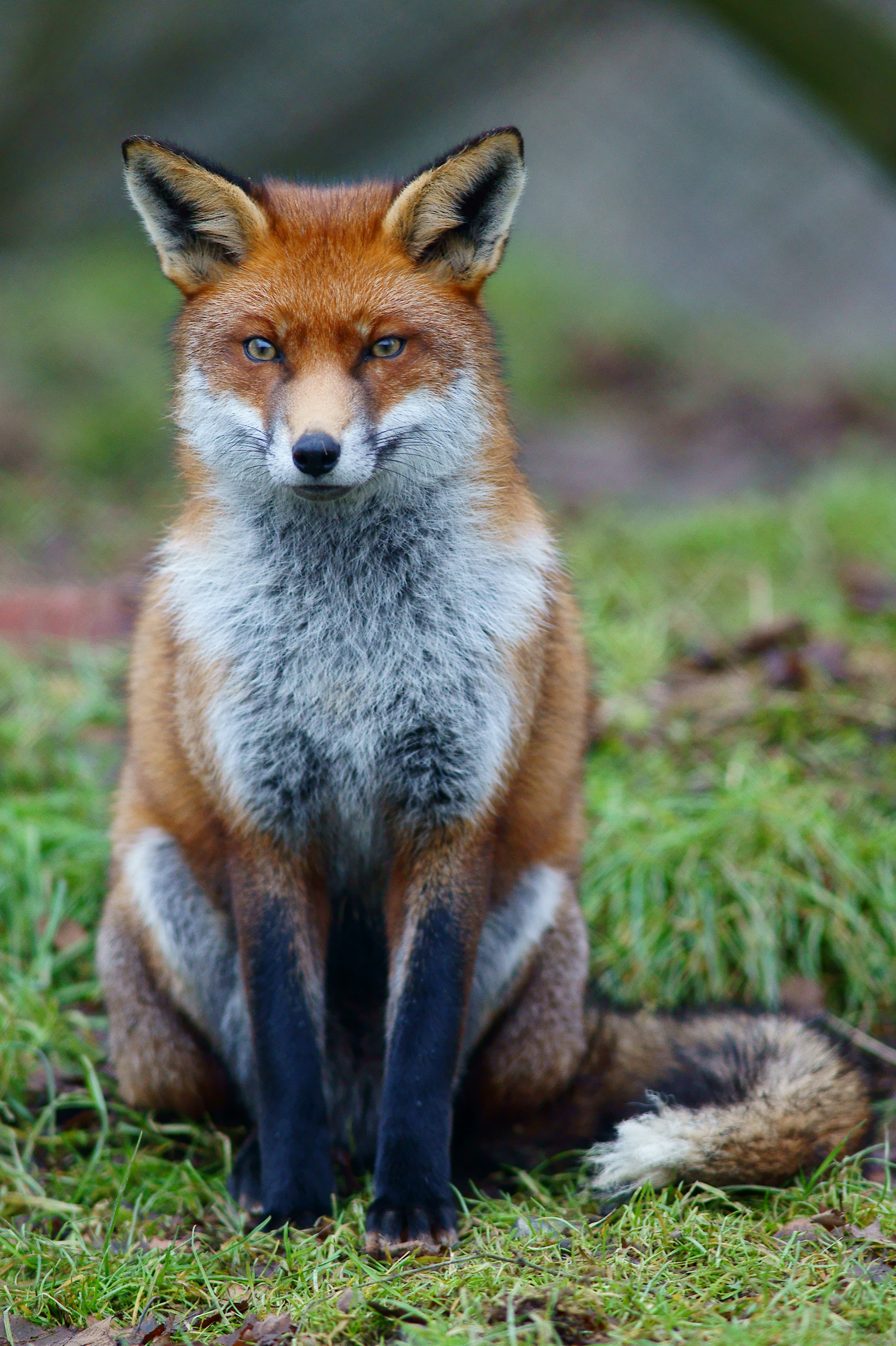
Red fox

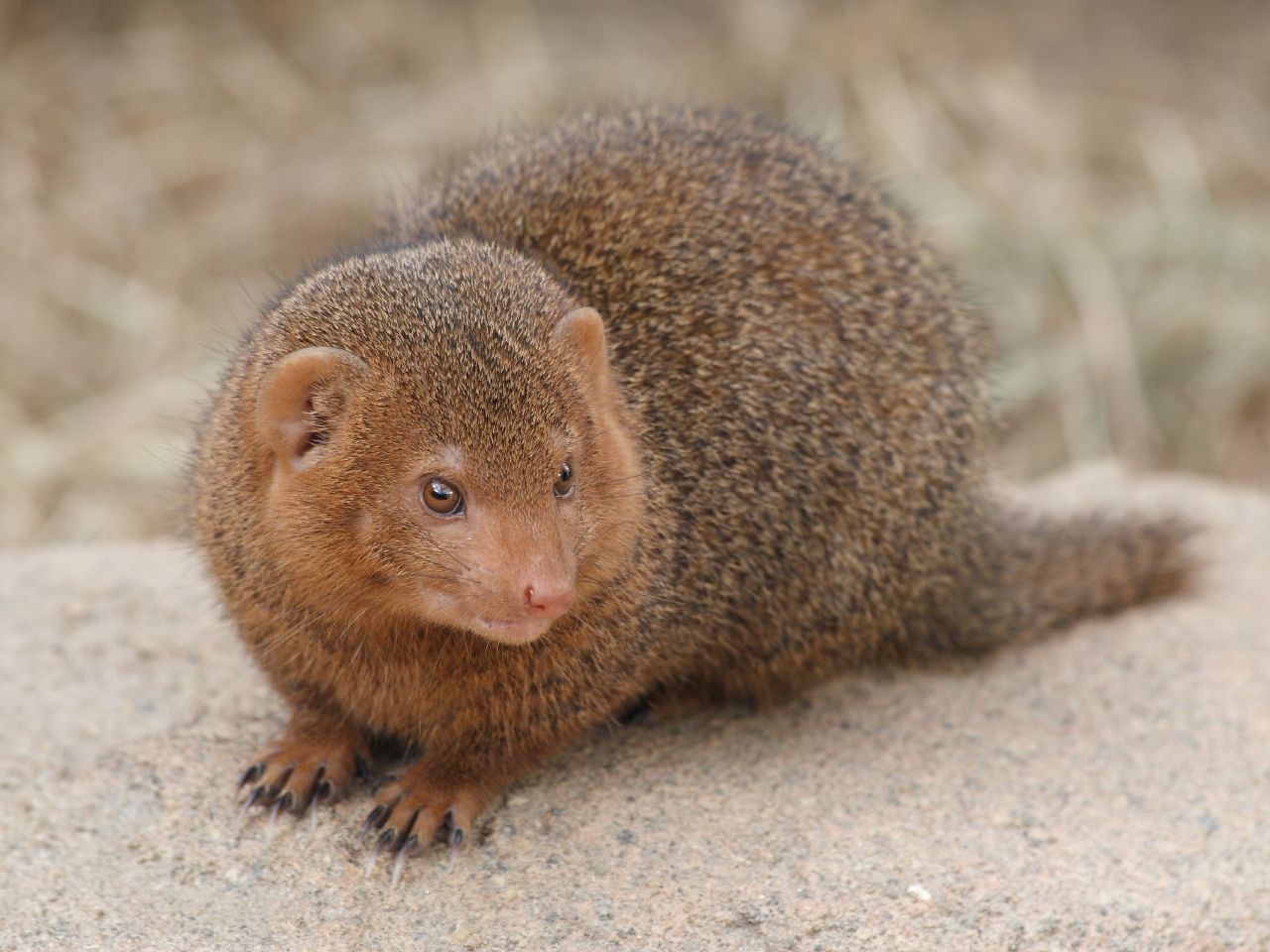
Mongoose

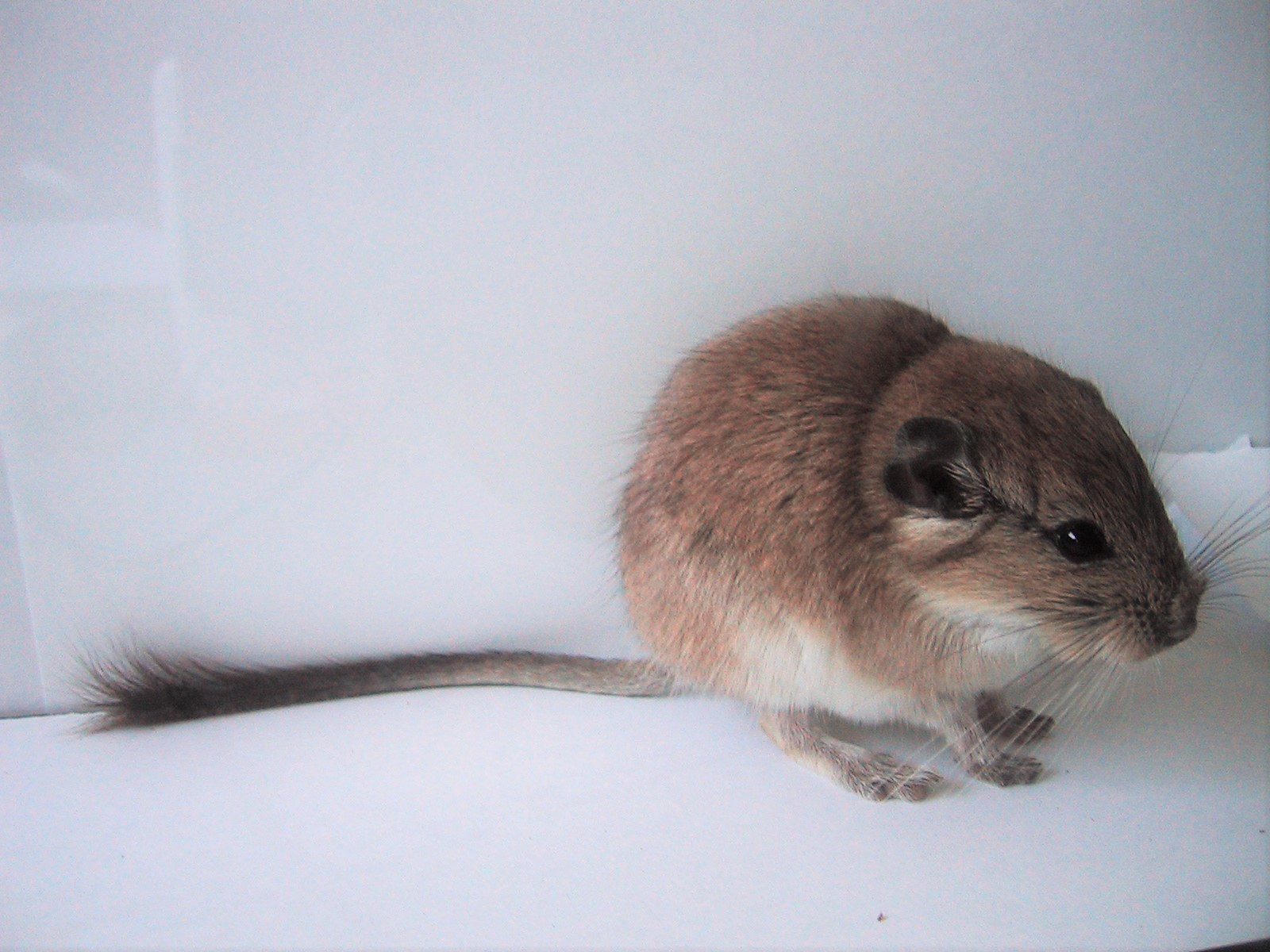
Plains viscacha rat

== Location ==
Lake Akfadou is situated between the Algerian provinces of Tizi Ouzou and Béjaïa, in close proximity to the source of the Soummam Valley. Its location within the Akfadou Forest renders it a strategically advantageous position within the Djurdjura National Park.

The lake is situated 43 kilometers west of Béjaïa and 50 kilometers east of Tizi Ouzou, with Mount Akfadou, 7 kilometers to the south, providing a backdrop. The lake is situated within the municipality of Adekar, which is located within the Adekar district.

== See also ==
- Djurdjura National Park.
- List of rivers of Algeria.
- Discharge regime.
- Tell Atlas.
- Ministry of Water Resources and Environment.
- Djurdjura.
- Kabylia.
- Igawawen.
- Tizi Ouzou Province.
- Béjaïa Province.
- Tourism in Algeria.
- Lists of tourist attractions.
