= Djurdjura National Park =

National park in Algeria

- IUCN category II (national park)
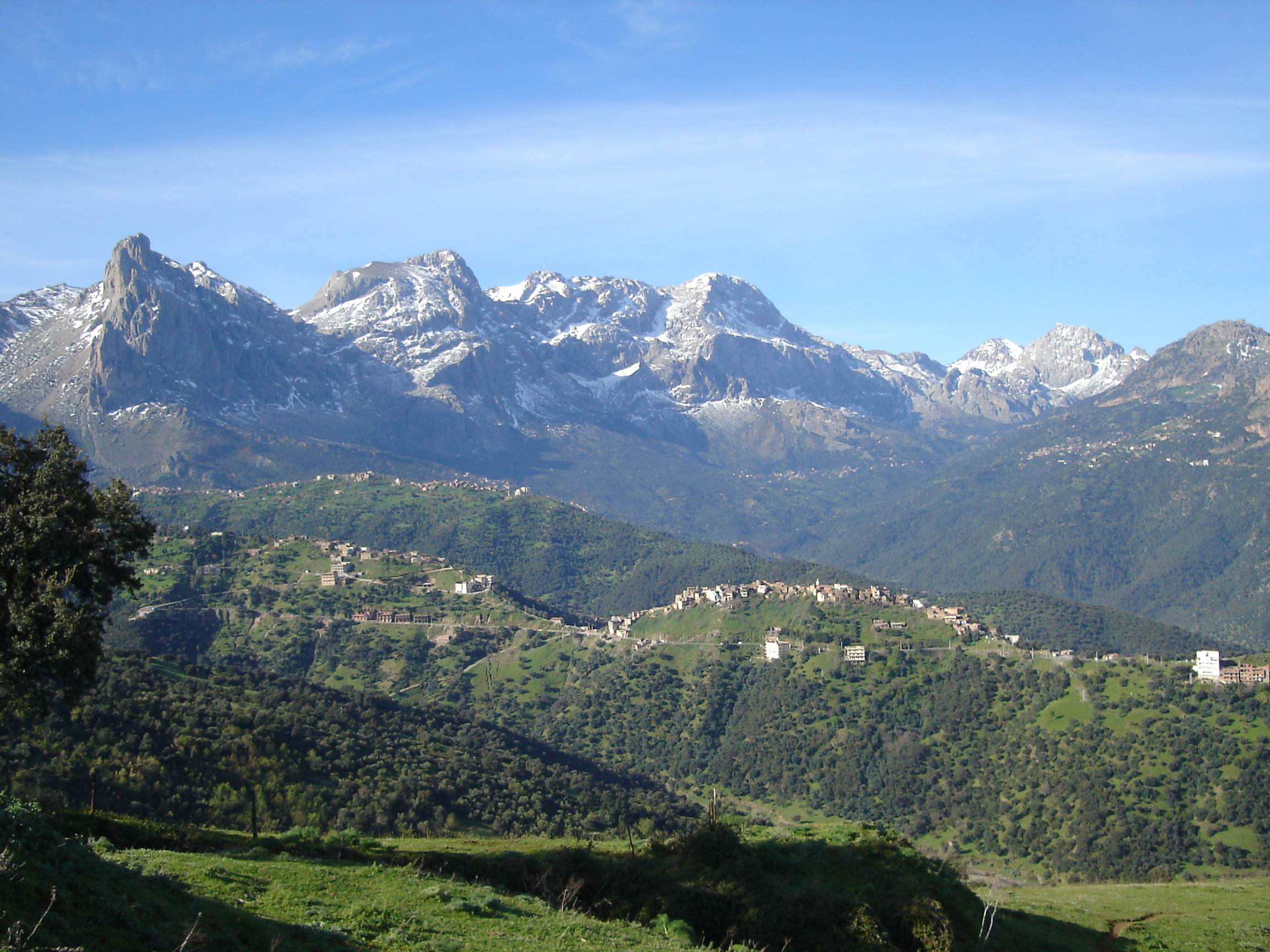
- View of the Djurdjura Range

- Location within Algeria
- Interactive map of Djurdjura National Park
- Location: Kabylie, Algeria
- Nearest city: Tizi Ouzou, Bouïra
- Coordinates: 36°28′00″N 4°08′00″E
- Area: 185 km^{2} (71 sq mi)
- Established: July 23, 1983
- Visitors: 500,000

The national park of Djurdjura (Kabyle: Urti Aɣelnaw n Ǧeṛǧeṛ) is one of the national parks of Algeria. It is located in Kabylie and is named after the Djurdjura Range of the Tell Atlas.

== Description ==
Nearby cities include Tizi Ouzou to the north and Bouïra to the south. The park is home to a very broken tectonics, as well as many forests, grottoes, gorges, and important fauna, including the endangered Barbary macaque, Macaca sylvanus, a primate whose prehistoric distribution in North Africa was much broader than today.

== Name ==
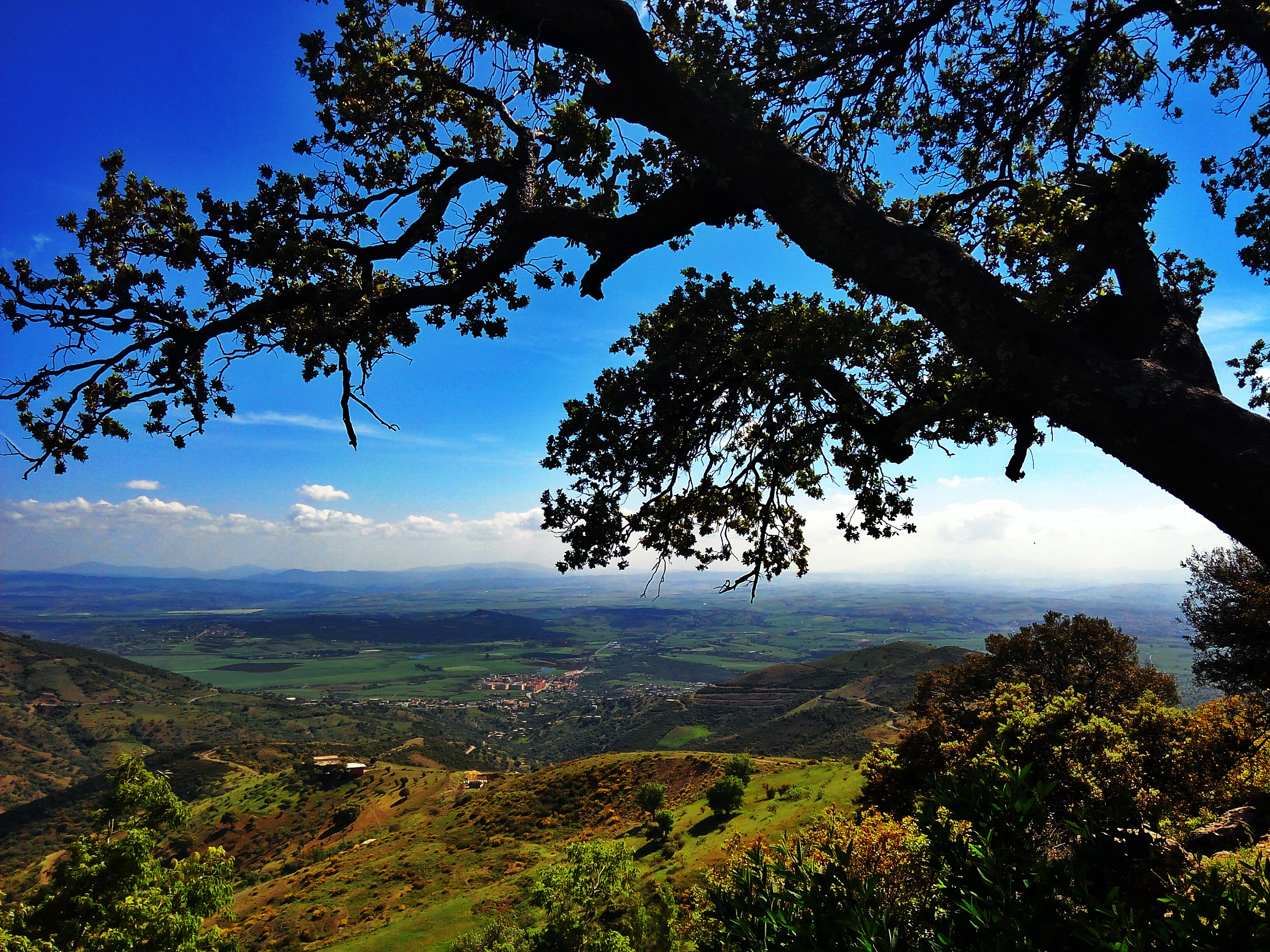
View of the Djurdjura National Park during the spring.

The name of the mountain chain comes from the Kabyle word Jjerjer which means "great cold" or "elevation", from the old compound word Jer n Jer "the mountain of the mountains". The Roman Empire used to call it Iron mountain in Latin (Mons Ferratus), in reference to the soil of the region, as well as to the resistance of the Kabyles against the Roman annexation of Kabylie. The name Djurdjura is also used for the villages located in this mountain chain. Mmis n'Djerdjer means "children of the Djurdjura", which is a Kabyle word referring to mountain inhabitants, there is also a Kabyle female group called DjurDjura.
