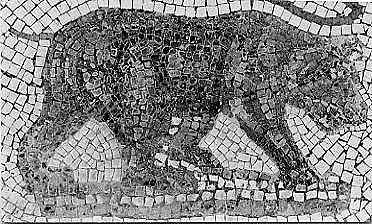
- Probable Atlas bear in Roman mosaic

Conservation status
- Extinct (1870) (IUCN 3.1)

Scientific classification
- Kingdom: Animalia
- Phylum: Chordata
- Class: Mammalia
- Order: Carnivora
- Family: Ursidae
- Genus: Ursus
- Species: U. arctos
- Subspecies: †U. a. crowtheri

Trinomial name
- †Ursus arctos crowtheri Schinz, 1844

= Atlas bear =

Extinct subspecies of brown bear in Africa

The Atlas bear or North African bear (Ursus arctos crowtheri) is an extinct population (or populations) of brown bears native to North Africa in Algeria and Morocco and Tunisia until their extinction sometime between the 8th century and 1870.

== Range ==
The Atlas bear was Africa's only native bear sub-species that survived into modern times. Once inhabiting the Atlas Mountains and neighbouring areas, from Morocco to Libya, the animal is now extinct.

Herodotus, who traveled to North Africa, describes their existence near Lake Tritonis as follows:

"The country of the Maxyes, and the rest of the western part of Libya, is much fuller of wild beasts and more wooded than the country of the nomads...is exceedingly mountainous and wooded and full of wild beasts. In that country are the huge snakes and the lions, and the elephants and bears and asps"

== Description ==
The Atlas bear was brownish-black in colour and lacked a white mark on the muzzle. The fur was 4–5 inches (102–127 mm) long and was reddish-orange on the underparts. The muzzle and claws were shorter than those of the American black bear, though it was stouter and thicker in body. The Atlas bear was said to have been 9 feet (2.7 m) long and weighed up to 1,000 pounds (450 kg).

== Genetics ==
A mitochondrial DNA study of bones of Atlas bears ranging in age from 10,000 to 1280 years Before Present found that the specimens belonged to two distinct clades: one, referred to as "Clade V", was indistinguishable from brown bears found in the Iberian Peninsula, while the other, "Clade VI", was highly distinct from all other brown bears, either closely related to the polar bear and Alaskan brown bears or outside the group that contains all other brown bear mitochondrial lineages.

Atlas bears do not appear to be closely related to Middle Eastern brown bear populations, despite geographic proximity, which suggests that the colonization of North Africa by brown bears was an event of considerable antiquity.

== Ecology ==
The Atlas bear's ecology is presumed to be similar to that of the other brown bears. The Atlas bear was said to have been mostly herbivorous, feeding on roots, acorns and nuts. However, since most bears today are omnivores, the Atlas bear is believed to have been able to eat meat as well. It was believed that, if it did eat meat, it probably ate small mammals as well as carrion while scavenging. Sympatric predators included the Barbary leopard and Barbary lion.

== Extinction ==
The Atlas bear became extinct shortly after modern firearms were developed. Overhunting may have contributed to their decline. The Atlas bear finally became extinct in the late 19th century; the last one recorded to be killed by hunters was in 1870 in the Tetouan Mountains in northern Morocco. Human activity can definitely be said to have played a large role in causing the extinction of the Atlas bear.

The alleged 19th century accounts have been questioned by zoologists such as Ángel Cabrera and Michel Thévenot, who point to the complete lack of physical evidence or bear tracks. The most recent confirmed fossil remains date to the 8th century, casting doubt on the commonly cited 1870 extinction date, a figure that appears mainly on modern websites and lacks a clear primary source.

Supporting an earlier extinction date, only one sighting was ever reported, in 1841, and by 1899 it was already noted that nothing had been heard of the species since. Furthermore, the 1841 report was not made by a professional naturalist, and no physical samples were collected to corroborate it. No named individual on record claims to have observed a live Atlas bear during the 19th century.

== See also ==
- List of African animals extinct in the Holocene
- Agriotherium africanum
