= Cheurfa Tizi Tegyar =

Coordinates: 36°42′55.5″N 4°46′4.7″E

Cheurfa
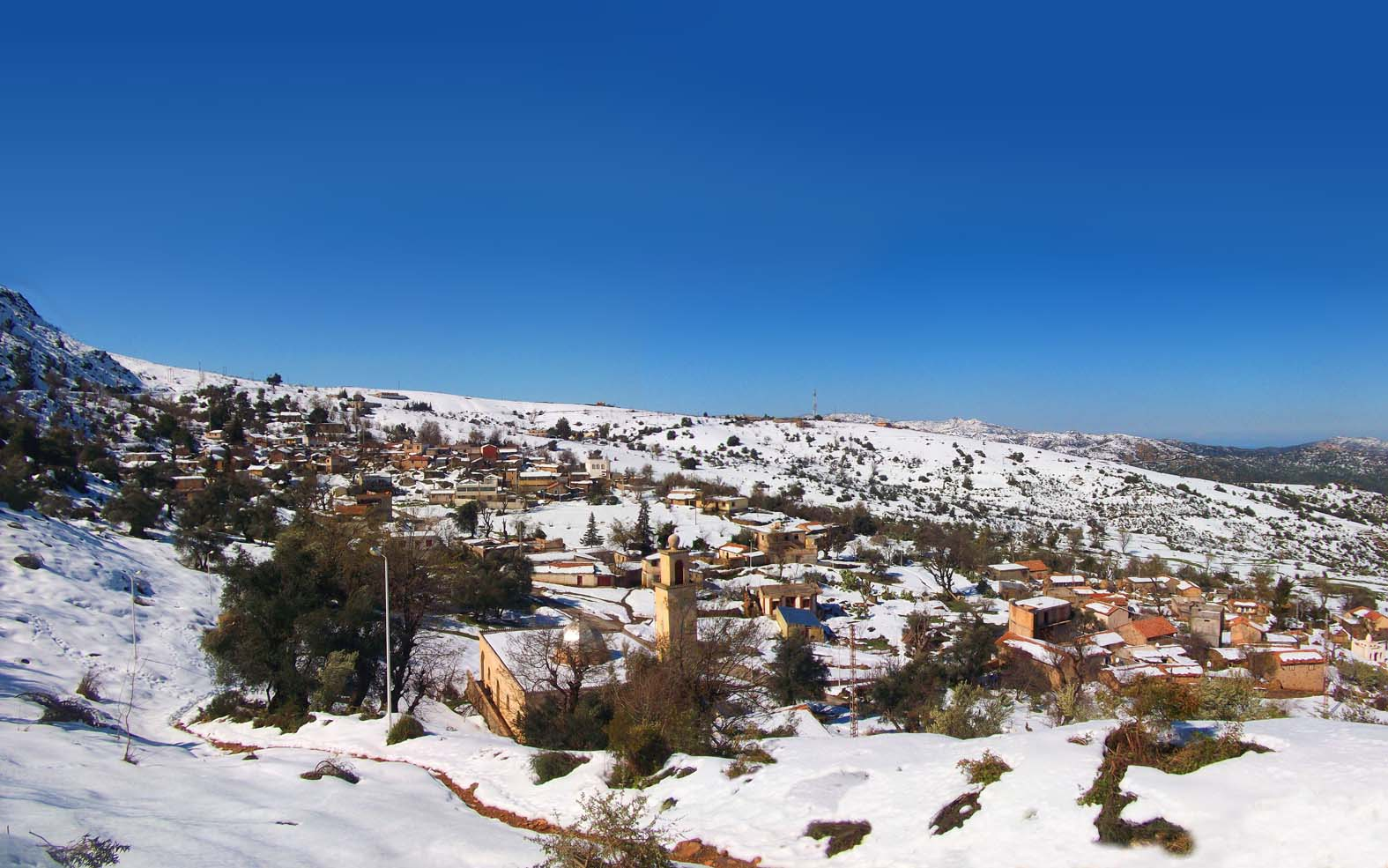

- Location within Algeria
- Country: Algeria
- Province: Béjaïa
- District: Tichy
- Commune: Taourirt Ighil
- Time zone: UTC+1 (West Africa Time)

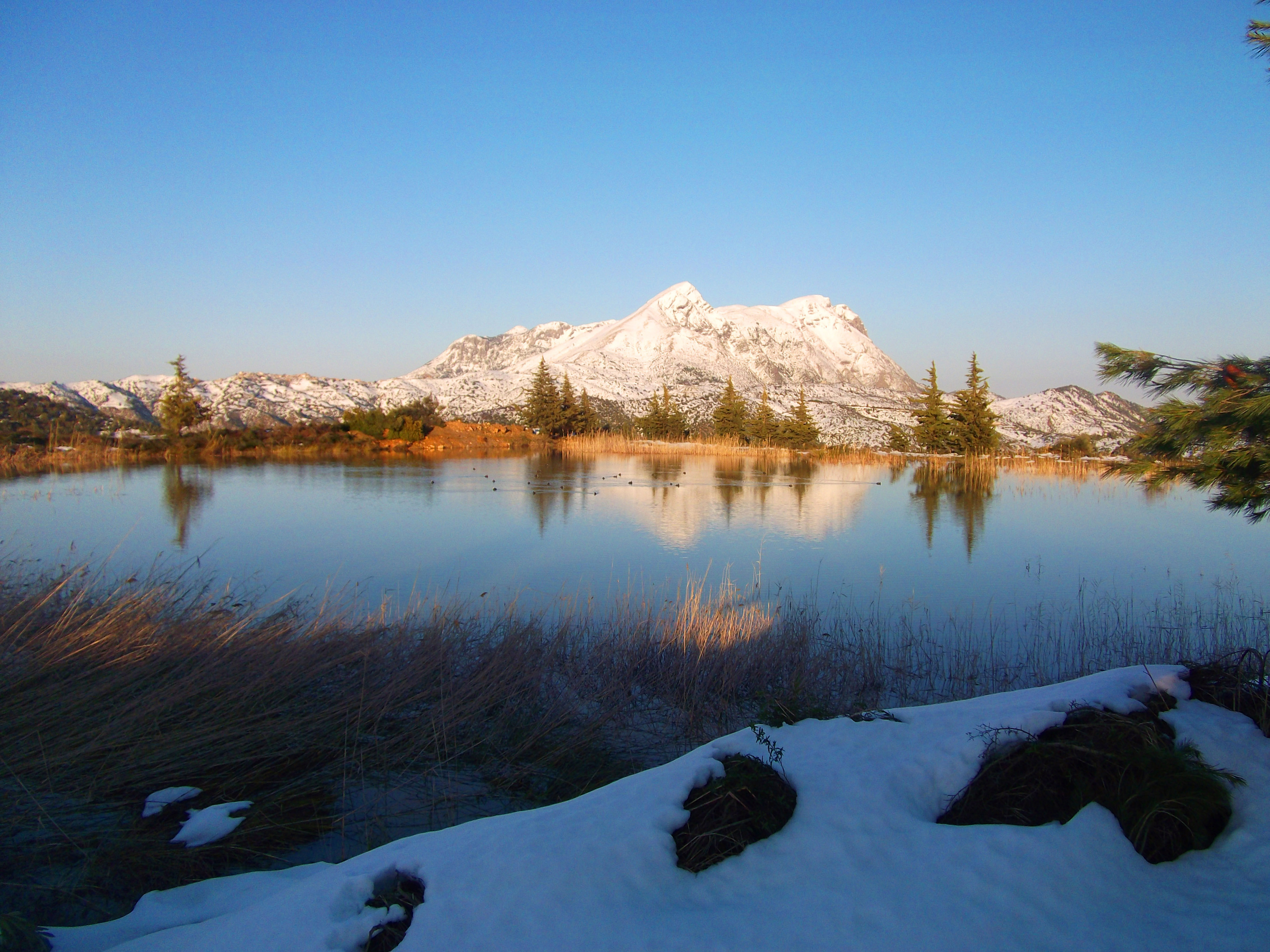
Cheurfa Tizi Tegyar.

Cheurfa Tizi Tegyar is a village in the Taourirt Ighil commune in Béjaïa Province, in the Kabylie region of Algeria.
