= Remchi District =

Remchi District دائرة الرمشي
- District
- Country: Algeria
- Province: Tlemcen
- District seat: Remchi

Population (2008)
  - Total: 84,022
- Time zone: UTC+01 (CET)

Remchi District is a district of Tlemcen Province in north-western Algeria.

The district is further divided into 5 municipalities:

- Remchi
- Beni Ouarsous
- Aïn Youcef
- Sebaa Chioukh
- El Fehoul
