= Bani Sanus (Algeria) =

Beni Snous Arabic: بني سنوس Tamazight: ⴰⵜ ⵙⵏⵓⵙ, romanized: At Snus
- Commune and town
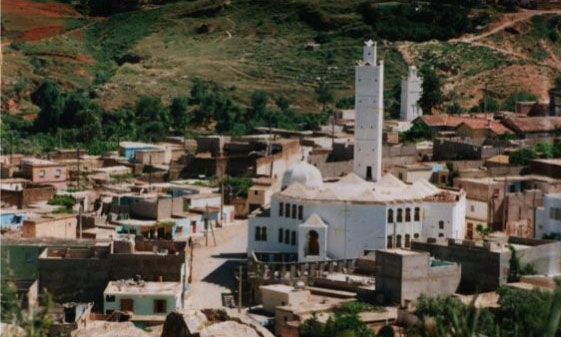
- Beni Snous

- Location within Algeria
- Coordinates: 34°38′34.76″N 1°33′41.22″W
- Country: Algeria
- Province: Tlemcen Province
- District: Beni Snous District

Population (2008)
  - Total: 11,318
- Time zone: UTC+1 (CET)
- Postal Code: 13037

Beni Snous (Arabic: بني سنوس, Tamazight: ⴰⵜ ⵙⵏⵓⵙ, romanized: At Snus) is a town and commune in Tlemcen Province, northwestern Algeria, located around 32 kilometers southwest of Tlemcen. It is known for its Ayrad festival held during the Amazigh New Year. According to the 2008 census, the commune had a population of 11,318.

== Geography ==
Beni Snous is located in the western part of Tlemcen Province. It borders Azails in the east, Sidi Djillali in the south, Beni Boussaid in the west, and Sidi Medjahed in the north. Beni Snous is located within the Tlemcen Mountains.

=== Localities ===
Since the 1984 administrative reorganizations, the commune of Beni Snous has consisted of the following localities:

- El-Fahs (commune seat)
- Menzel
- Khémis
- Ouled Moussa
- Ouled Arbi
- Béni Achir
- Mzoughen Aimani
- Sidi Larbi
- Mazer
- Ouled Bouchama
- Béni Zidaz
- Gasba

== History ==
The region is home to the ruins of numerous villages which suggest a greater expansion of population, particularly before the 13th century.

Al-Bakri first cited the area in his description of North Africa under the name of Tizil. The inhabitants of the region were called the Azails in medieval accounts. Later, the Spanish historian Marmol said in his 16th century work Africa, Volume II: "Almost all of the inhabitants are blacksmiths and have several iron mines in which they work. The surrounding land abounds in wheat and pastures, but the main traffic is iron which is sold in Tlemcen and elsewhere. The city is closed by high walls."

The region has historically provided many scholars to Tlemcen under the Zayyanid Dynasty, such as Sidi Sheykh Muhammad Ibn Youcef al-Senussione, a famous theologian. In 1905, the sociologist Edmond Destaing studied the Beni Snous dialect and wrote several essays, including the French-Berber dictionary.

During the Algerian War, it was a strategic position and logistical base of the National Liberation Army due to its rugged terrain, dense forests, and proximity to Morocco. The region was declared a military zone in 1956 and was bombed by the French army.

== Demography ==
According to the 2008 Algerian census, the commune had a population of 11,318 with a population density of 26.75/km^{2} (69.3/sq mi). Compared to its population of 10,888 in 1998, it increased by 0.4%.

== Economy ==
The commune's economy is rural, with most inhabitants engaged in farming and pastoral activities. The local forests, dominated by Aleppo pines, holm oaks, and junipers, contribute to local forestry products. The commune is recognized by the Algerian government as a region with investment potential due to its location and potential in natural resource development.

The commune has high electrification (99%), gas (98%,) and water network coverage (90.7%).

== Society and Culture ==
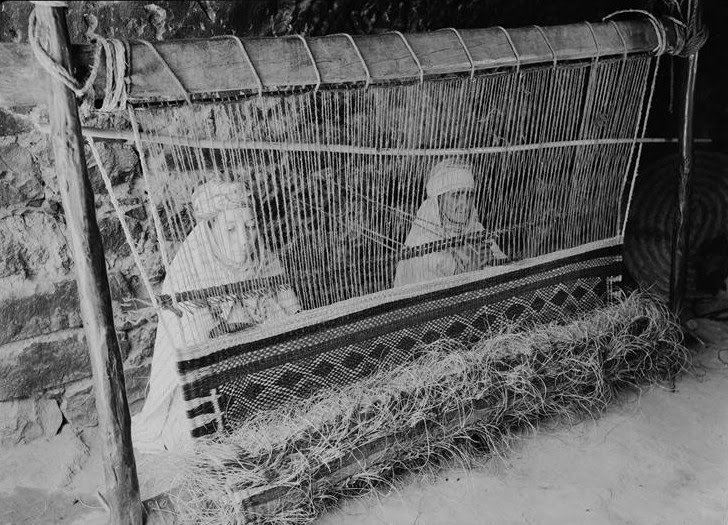
The fabricating of the hassira.

The region forms a linguistical island of berbophones where the inhabitants speak the local Beni Snous dialect.

The celebration of Yennayer is distinct compared to the rest of the country. It is known as the Ayrad festival, where a procession is organized by young people dressed in traditional costumes and animal masks as they give out food and sweets to the populace. It usually takes place in the evening.

Most of the commune's inhabitants are villagers who practice arboriculture. Traditional practices show an emphasis on thrift, frugality, and self-sufficiency. Families rely on the land for food, income, and daily sustenance. Their culture dates back to the 11th century. Their fields are spread out in irrigated terraces carrying olive trees, fig trees, almond trees, and walnut trees. Raising livestock is also practiced.

The town is known for its production of hassira, a type of rug.

== Heritage ==
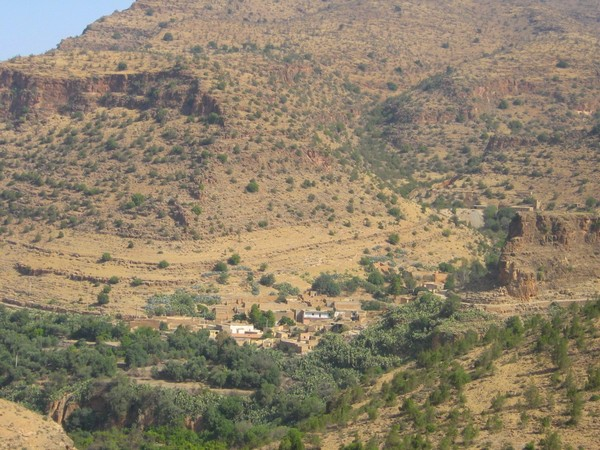
The village of El Kef

The traditional houses of Beni Snous are built from dry stone on the side of valleys. Many homes are pierced with chimneys which allow heating. The villages of Khémis, Béni Achir, and Ouled Moussa contain ancient churches and mosques with brick minarets. Oral tradition says that the mosques of Beni Snous were founded on the orders of Abdellah Ben Djafar, the nephew of Ali ibn Abi Talib and the companion of Okba Ibn Nafi.

== Famous figures from the commune ==
- Riyad Mahrez, an international footballer whose parents were born here.
- Idris bin Abdullah al-Senussi, a monarch of Libya. His ancestors derived from here.
- Ahmed El Ghazi, a senior Algerian civil servant, was born here.
- Lakhdar El Habiri, a senior Algerian civil servant.

== See also ==
- Beni Snous dialect
- Yennayer
- Tlemcen Mountains
