= El Aricha Province =

El Aricha Province ولاية العريشة ⴰⴳⴻⵣⴷⵓ ⵏ ⵍⴻⵄⵔⵉⵛⴰ
- Province
- Map of El Aricha Province
- Coordinates: 34°13′22″N 1°15′21″W
- Country: Algeria
- Created: 2026
- Capital: El Aricha

Area
  - Total: 3,100 km^{2} (1,200 sq mi)

Population (2008)
  - Total: 30,614
  - Density: 9.9/km^{2} (26/sq mi)
- Time zone: UTC+01 (CET)
- Area code: +213
- ISO 3166 code: DZ-13
- Districts: 2
- Municipalities: 4

El Aricha Province (Arabic: ولاية العريشة, romanized: Wilāyat al-ʿArīsha) is a province (wilaya) in western Algeria, with El Aricha as its provincial capital. It was created in 2026 by separation from Tlemcen Province.

The province lies on the Moroccan border in the Atlas Mountains and covers an area of about 3,100 km². Around 31,000 people lived in the province at the 2008 census, giving it a population density of about 10 inhabitants per square kilometre.

Municipalities of the province of El Aricha

== Administrative divisions ==
The wilaya of El Aricha is divided into 4 communes, grouped into 2 districts (daïras).

Daïras	Communes	
Daïras	Name	Pop. 2008
El Aricha	El Aricha	6,673
El Aricha	El Gor	8,539
Sidi Djillali	Sidi Djillali	6,697
Sidi Djillali	El Bouihi	8,705
