= Hennaya District =

Hennaya District دائرة الحناية
- District
- Country: Algeria
- Province: Tlemcen
- District seat: Hennaya

Population (2008)
  - Total: 41,575
- Time zone: UTC+01 (CET)

Hennaya District is a district of Tlemcen Province in north-western Algeria.

The district is further divided into 3 municipalities:

- Hennaya
- Zenata
- Ouled Riyah
