= Felaoucene District =

Coordinates: 35°0′N 1°39′E

Felaoucene District دائرة فلاوسن
- District
- Country: Algeria
- Province: Tlemcen
- District seat: Felaoucene

Population (2008)
  - Total: 19,798
- Time zone: UTC+01 (CET)

Felaoucene District is a district of Tlemcen Province in north-western Algeria.

The district is further divided into 3 municipalities:

- Fellaoucene
- Aïn Fetah
- Aïn Kebira
