= Battle of Fellaoucene =

Battle during the Algerian War of Independence

- Part of Algerian War
Date	18-20 April 1957
Location	Fellaoucene, French Algeria
Result	FLN victory

Belligerents
France	(Algeria) FLN

Commanders and leaders
Serge Andolenko	Ouachen Moulay Ali

Units involved
French foreign legion: 5th Foreign Infantry Regiment	ALN: Wilaya V

Strength
Algerian claims: 1,000 soldiers + 30 reconnaissance planes 12 helicopters	Algerian claims: 330 militants

Casualties and losses
Algerian claims: 500 to 700 killed 400 wounded 1 aircraft shot down	Algerian claims: 120 killed 60 wounded

The Battle of Fellaoucene was a military engagement during the Algerian war which took place in the area of Fellaoucene near Tlemcen on 20 April 1957 during the Algerian War of Independence.

The battle coincided with the 16th day of Ramadan, when 30,000 French colonial soldiers equipped with heavy weapons and supported by tanks, 30 reconnaissance planes and 12 helicopters were sent to encounter 330 mujahideen of the Algerian National Liberation Front armed with makeshift rifles. On the French side the 5th Foreign Infantry Regiment participated in the compat against the FLN militants. The FLN militants put up a strong resistance against the French colonial army. As a result of the battle, the Algerians heavily defeated the French colonial army which lost 500 to 700 soldiers killed, 400 seriously wounded and 1 aircraft shot down, while the Algerians only had 120 killed and 60 wounded. French military reports claim 73 rebels were eliminated. A few days later, the French army took revenge by bombarding the entire region of Fellaoucene and the Trara mountains from Nedroma to Ghazaouet with napalm bombs and transferring the population.
