= Bab El Assa District =

Bab El Assa District دائرة Tlemcen
- District
- Country: Algeria
- Province: Tlemcen
- District seat: Bab El Assa

Population (2008)
  - Total: 22,416
- Time zone: UTC+01 (CET)

Bab El Assa District is a district of Tlemcen Province in north-western Algeria.

The district is further divided into 3 municipalities:

- Bab El Assa
- Souani
- Souk Tlata
