= School of Mines El Abed =

Coordinates: 34.4751°N 1.6659°W

The École des Mines d'El Abed (EMEA) is an Algerian public school, under the supervision of the Ministry of Mines. It is responsible for providing training activities for the development of qualifications in mining-related professions. It is located in the municipality of El Bouihi, in the Tlemcen Province.

== Location ==
The EMEA is located in the mining village of El-Abed, in the municipality of El Bouihi, in the Tlemcen Province, on the Algerian-Moroccan border. It is situated 94 kilometers southwest of Tlemcen and 60 kilometers south of Maghnia. The infrastructure extends over 3 hectares.

== Establishment ==
The school was established in the form of a public industrial and commercial establishment in Algeria in 2004, on the site of the former zinc and lead mining complex of El Abed (Tlemcen Province), by executive decree No. 04-104 of April 5, 2004, creating, organizing, and operating the EMEA.

The school provides professional training (initial and advanced) for:

- Skilled workers
- Qualified workers and agents
- Highly qualified workers and agents
- Supervisors and technicians

The EMEA provides internships for university students and new recruits of companies.

== Facilities and capacity ==
The school is led by Mustapha Mekarzia. It consists of several educational facilities, an administrative block, and a training block. In 2018, it had a capacity of 100 places.
