= Chatouane District =

Chatouane District دائرة Tlemcen
- District
- Map of Algeria highlighting Tlemcen Province
- Country: Algeria
- Province: Tlemcen
- District seat: Chatouane
- Time zone: UTC+01 (CET)

Chatouane District is a district of Tlemcen Province in northwestern Algeria.

The district is further divided into 3 municipalities:

- Chetouane
- Aïn Fezza
- Amieur
