= Sebdou District =

Sebdou District دائرة سبدو
- District
- Interactive map of Sebdou District
- Coordinates: 34.6406°N 1.3211°W
- Country: Algeria
- Province: Tlemcen
- District seat: Sebdou

Population (2008)
  - Total: 55,012
- Time zone: UTC+01 (CET)

Sebdou District is a district of Tlemcen Province in north-western Algeria.

The district is further divided into 3 municipalities:

- Sebdou
- El Gor
- El Aricha
