= Ghazaouet District =

- District
- Map of Algeria highlighting Tlemcen Province

- Map of Tlemcen Province highlighting Ghazaouet District
- Coordinates: 35.093858°N 1.86038°W
- Country: Algeria
- Province: Tlemcen
- District seat: Ghazaouet

Population (2008)
  - Total: 66,843
- Time zone: UTC+01 (CET)

Ghazaouet District is a district of Tlemcen Province in north-western Algeria.

The district is further divided into 4 municipalities:

- Ghazaouet
- Souahlia
- Tienet
- Dar Yaghmouracene
