= Béni Boussaïd District =

Béni Boussaïd District دائرة بني بوسعيد
- District
- Country: Algeria
- Province: Tlemcen
- District seat: Béni Boussaïd

Population (2008)
  - Total: 20,346
- Time zone: UTC+01 (CET)

Béni Boussaïd District is a district of Tlemcen Province in north-western Algeria.

The district is further divided into 2 municipalities:

- Beni Boussaid
- Sidi Medjahed
