= Mansourah District (Tlemcen Province) =

District in Algeria

Mansourah District دائرة المنصورة
- District
- Country: Algeria
- Province: Tlemcen
- District seat: Mansourah

Population (2008)
  - Total: 78,606
- Time zone: UTC+01 (CET)

Mansourah District is a district of Tlemcen Province in north-western Algeria.

The district is further divided into 4 municipalities:

- Mansoura
- Terny Beni Hdiel
- Aïn Ghoraba
- Beni Mester
