= Béni Snous District =

Coordinates: 34.6430°N 1.5615°W

Béni Snous District دائرة بني سنوس
- District
- Country: Algeria
- Province: Tlemcen
- District seat: Béni Snous

Population (2008)
  - Total: 21,646
- Time zone: UTC+01 (CET)

Béni Snous District is a district of Tlemcen Province in north-western Algeria.

The district is further divided into 3 municipalities:

- Beni Snous
- Azails
- Beni Bahdel
