= Sabra District =

Sabra District دائرة Tlemcen
- District
- Country: Algeria
- Province: Tlemcen
- District seat: Sabra
- Time zone: UTC+01 (CET)

Sabra District is a district of Tlemcen Province in north-western Algeria.

The district is further divided into 2 municipalities:

- Sabra
- Bouhlou

== Geo-co-ordinates ==
Latitude = 34.6780, Longitude = -1.3662 Lat = 34 degrees, 40.7 minutes North Long = 1 degrees, 22.0 minutes West
