= Ouled Mimoun District =

Coordinates: 34.9044°N 1.0347°W

Ouled Mimoun District دائرة أولاد ميمون
- District
- Map of Algeria highlighting Tlemcen Province

- Map of Tlemcen Province highlighting Ouled Mimoun District
- Country: Algeria
- Province: Tlemcen
- District seat: Ouled Mimoun
- Time zone: UTC+01 (CET)

Ouled Mimoun District is a district of Tlemcen Province in northwestern Algeria.

The district is further divided into 3 municipalities:

- Ouled Mimoun
- Oued Lakhdar
- Beni Semiel
