= Marsa Ben M'Hidi District =

Marsa Ben M'Hidi District دائرة مرسى بن مهيدي
- District
- Country: Algeria
- Province: Tlemcen
- District seat: Marsa Ben M'Hidi

Population (2008)
  - Total: 11,905
- Time zone: UTC+01 (CET)

Marsa Ben M'Hidi District is a district of Tlemcen Province in north-western Algeria.

The district is further divided into 2 municipalities:

- Marsa Ben M'Hidi
- Msirda Fouaga
