= Sidi Djillali District =

Sidi Djillali District دائرة Tlemcen
- District
- Map of Algeria highlighting Tlemcen Province
- Country: Algeria
- Province: Tlemcen
- District seat: Sidi Djillali
- Time zone: UTC+01 (CET)

Sidi Djillali District is a district of Tlemcen Province in north-western Algeria.

The district is further divided into 3 municipalities:

- Sidi Djillali
- El Bouihi
