= Honaine District =

Honaine District دائرة Tlemcen
- District
- Country: Algeria
- Province: Tlemcen
- District seat: Honaine

Population (2008)
  - Total: 12,341
- Time zone: UTC+01 (CET)

Houanaine District is a district of Tlemcen Province in north-western Algeria.

The district is further divided into 2 municipalities:

- Honaine
- Beni Khellad
