= M'Hamed Ben Rahal =

M'hamed Ben Rahal
- محمد بن رحال
- Born: M'hamed Ben Rahal; 1858; Nedroma, Algeria
- Died: 1928 (aged 69–70); Nedroma, Algeria
- Citizenship: Algeria
- Education: Franco-Arab School; Imperial College of Algiers
- Occupations: Writer, politician, notable
- Writing career
- Pen name: Si M'hamed
- Language: Arabic, French
- Years active: 1876–1928
- Period: Late 19th century – early 20th century
- Genres: Short story, essay, article
- Notable work: La vengeance du cheikh (1891)
- Movement: Franco-Muslim elites during the colonial era

M'hamed Ben Rahal (in arabic محمد بن رحال ), born around May 16, 1858 (Note: Several sources indicate slightly different years of birth (1855, 1856, 1858). In this article, the date May 16, 1858, is retained as the most frequently cited.) in Nedroma and died on October 6, 1928, in the same city) was an Algerian notable, politician, and writer. He is best known for the short story La vengeance du cheikh (1891), often cited as one of the earliest works of fiction written in French by an "indigenous" Algerian author.

== Biography ==
Born in Nedroma: his father, Hamza Ben Rahal, was a cadi. He attended the “Franco-Arab school” and later the Imperial College of Algiers, obtaining a baccalauréat (he is often mentioned among the first “indigenous graduates” in Algeria). In 1876, he entered the local administration and succeeded his father as qaïd/khalifa of Nedroma. He later pursued political and cultural activities, participated in journals and Orientalist congresses, and engaged in public debates about education and the condition of Muslims in colonial Algeria.

At the end of the 19th century, Ben Rahal emerged as a representative figure of the "Franco-Arab" elite engaged in civic and political initiatives. He served as a general councillor, delegate, and advocate for education, reform, and the defense of Algerians’ civic rights. He was also a member of learned societies and contributed to both French and Maghrebi journals.

== Literary work ==
M'hamed Ben Rahal authored several articles and at least one known short story, La vengeance du cheikh (sometimes cited as La vengeance du Cheikh de Nedroma). This story, published in 1891 in the *Revue algérienne et tunisienne littéraire et artistique* (and later cited in bibliographies on Maghrebi literature), is frequently mentioned by scholars as one of the first fictional texts in French written by an "indigenous" Algerian author.

=== La vengeance du cheikh (1891) ===
- Publication and status: The short story, dated 1891, has been analyzed by modern scholars; several recent academic studies regard it as a pioneering work, though sometimes classified as “unpublished” in certain corpora (literary analysis available on ASJP / CERIST).
- Themes and reception: According to scholarly analyses (academic articles and historical notes), the work deals with themes of tradition, honor, revenge, and the confrontation between modernity and tradition in colonial Algerian society.

Recent studies discuss the author’s temporal awareness and intentionality within the narrative.

== Historical contribution and legacy ==
Ben Rahal is often cited by historians of Algeria as an example of a local elite seeking to reconcile modernity (French education) with religious and cultural tradition. He is mentioned in historical and literary studies on the early stages of Francophone Algerian literature and the birth of moderate political movements. His local role (as qaïd) and public interventions earned him posthumous recognition: monographs, historical works, and academic articles have analyzed his legacy.

== Bibliography ==
- Biographical notice – Comité des travaux historiques et scientifiques (CTHS)
- F. Amrouche, "La Vengeance Du Cheikh De M'hamed Ben Rahhal," ASJP / CERIST, 2023 (literary analysis)
- Historical studies and book chapters: works citing Ben Rahal in syntheses on colonial Algeria (Cambridge University Press, etc.)
- Abdellali Merdaci, Auteurs algériens de langue française de la période coloniale. Dictionnaire biographique. Paris: L’Harmattan, 2010, p. 79

== See also ==
=== Related articles ===
- Algerian literature
- Nedroma

=== External links ===
- CTHS entry — M'hamed (Mohamed) Ben Rahal
- Article / analysis — ASJP / CERIST: “La Vengeance Du Cheikh De M'hamed Ben Rahhal”
