= Ibn Abd al-Malik al-Marrakushi =

Maghrebi Arab scholar, historian, judge and biographer

Ibn abd al-Malik al-Murrakushi
- بن عبد الملك المراكشي
- Born: 5 July 1237; Marrakesh, present-day Morocco
- Died: September 1303 (aged 66); New Tlemcen (Mansoura), present-day Algeria
- Occupations: scholar, judge, historian
- Known for: Historian biographer
- Notable work: Ad-Dayl wa Takmila

Ibn abd al-Malik al-Marrakushi or al-Murrakushi (full name: Abu Abd Allah Muhammed ibn Muhammed ibn abd al-Malik al-Marrakushi Arabic: أبو عبد الله محمد بن محمد بن عبد الملك المراكشي; 5 July 1237 – September 1303) was a Maghrebi scholar, historian, judge, and biographer.

He is the author of the famous book 'Ad-Dayl wa Takmila' a 9 volume biographical encyclopedia of notable people from Maghreb and al-Andalus.

== Life ==
Born into a notable family of prestigious Arab lineage in Marrakesh, hence the nisba, al-Marrakushi. In 1300, Ibn Abd al-Malik left Marrakesh following the court of the Marinid King Abu Yaqub Yusuf an-Nasr and settled in Mansoura, where the Marinids were besieging Tlemcen in an attempt to oust the Abd al-Wadid dynasty. He seems to have died there three years later, in September 1303, despite reports of him being at Aghmat only three months earlier.He had a son who settled in Málaga where he became a close friend of Ibn al-Khatib. The latter based much of his biographical book Al-Ihata on the works of Ibn Abd al-Malik.

== Work ==
- Ad-Dayl wa Takmila (الذيل والتكملة) ('Appendix and Supplement'): Ibn abd al-Malik's biographical dictionary and life's work completed months before his death. His intention to complete the biographical dictionaries of Ibn Bashkuwāl and Ibn al-Faraḍī resulted in this surpassing sequel. Of the nine original, approx. 700 page volumes, four volumes survive intact—vols. 1, 5, 6, and 8. Two more survive in part—vols. 2 and 4. The work is rich in detail. Some inaccurate renderings in name pronunciation arise from the Arabic writing system.

Al-Dhayl wa-al-takmilah : li-kitābay al-Mawṣūl wa-al-Ṣilah (الذيل والتكملة لكتابي الموصول والصلة)

== See also ==
- Abd al-Wahid al-Marrakushi
- List of Arab scientists and scholars
