= Nedroma =

Nedroma ندرومة
- City
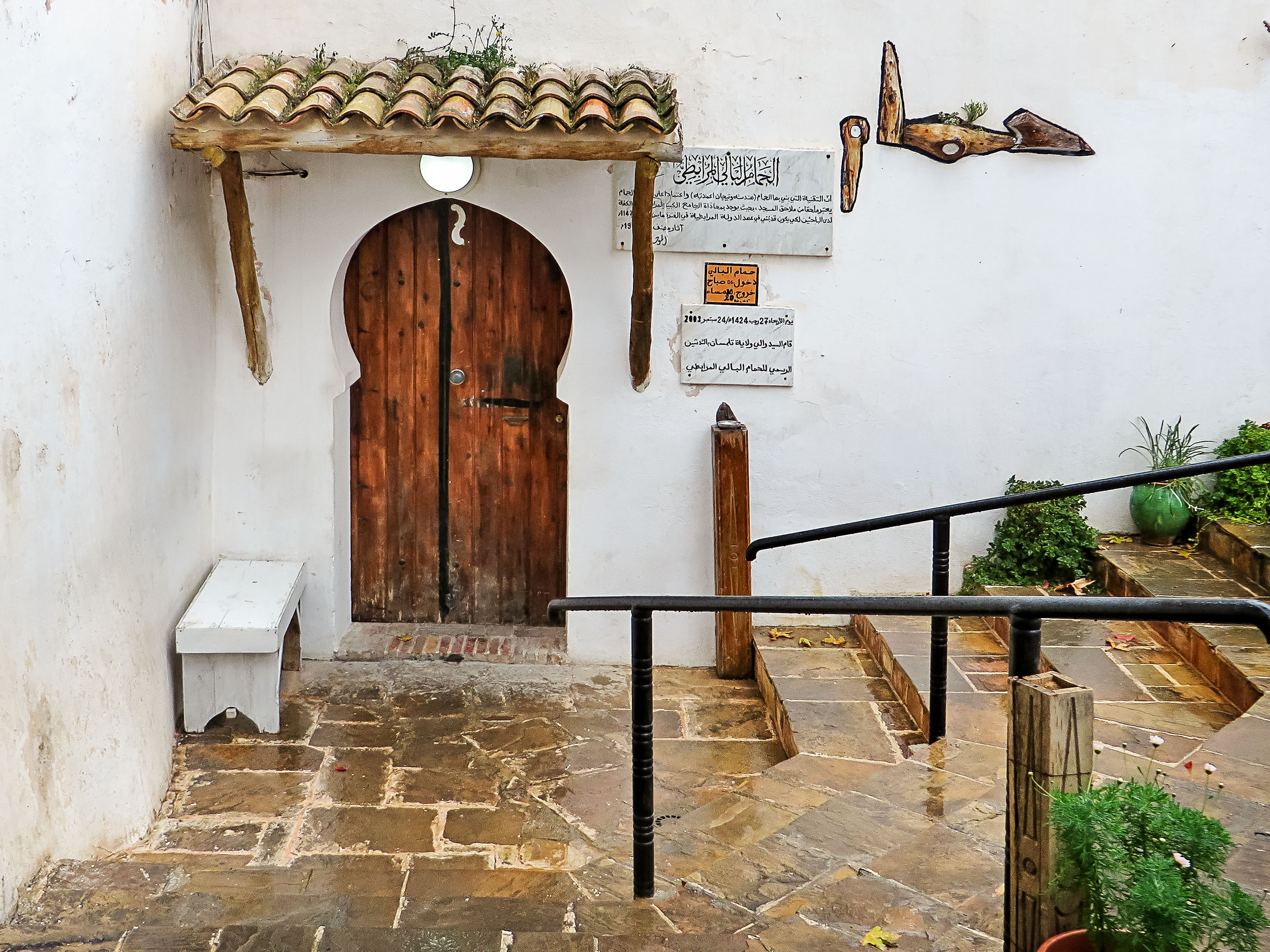
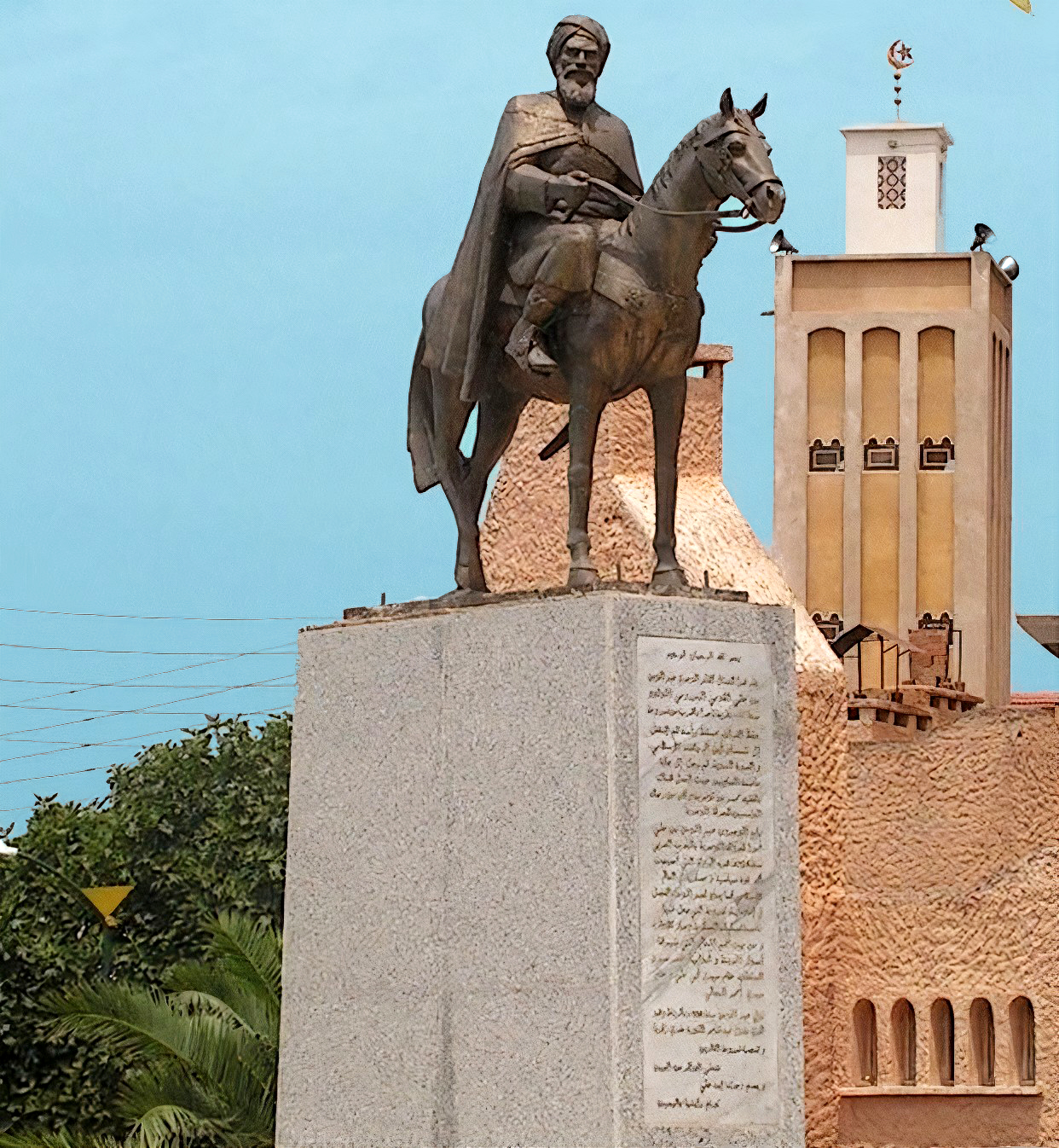
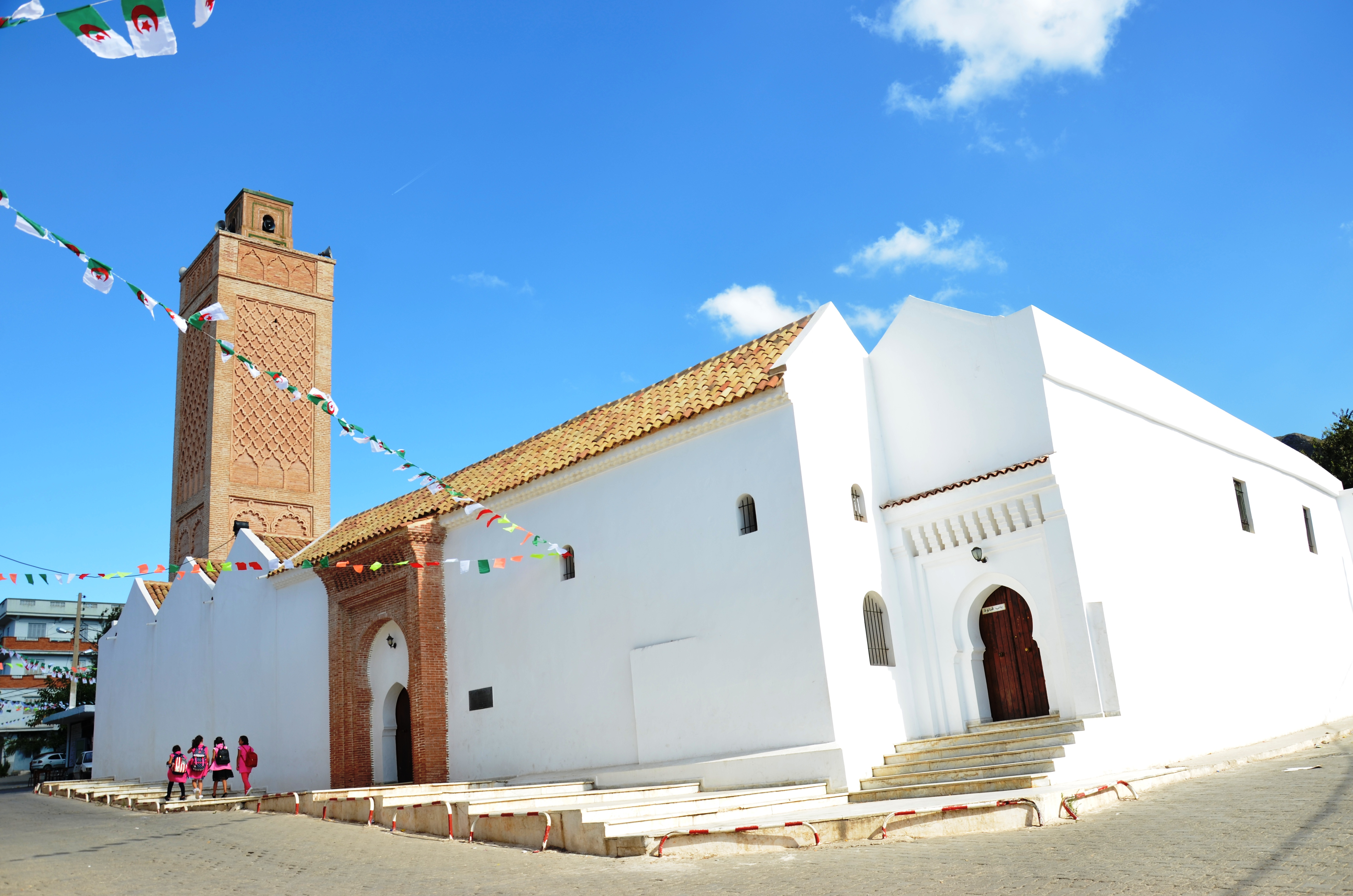
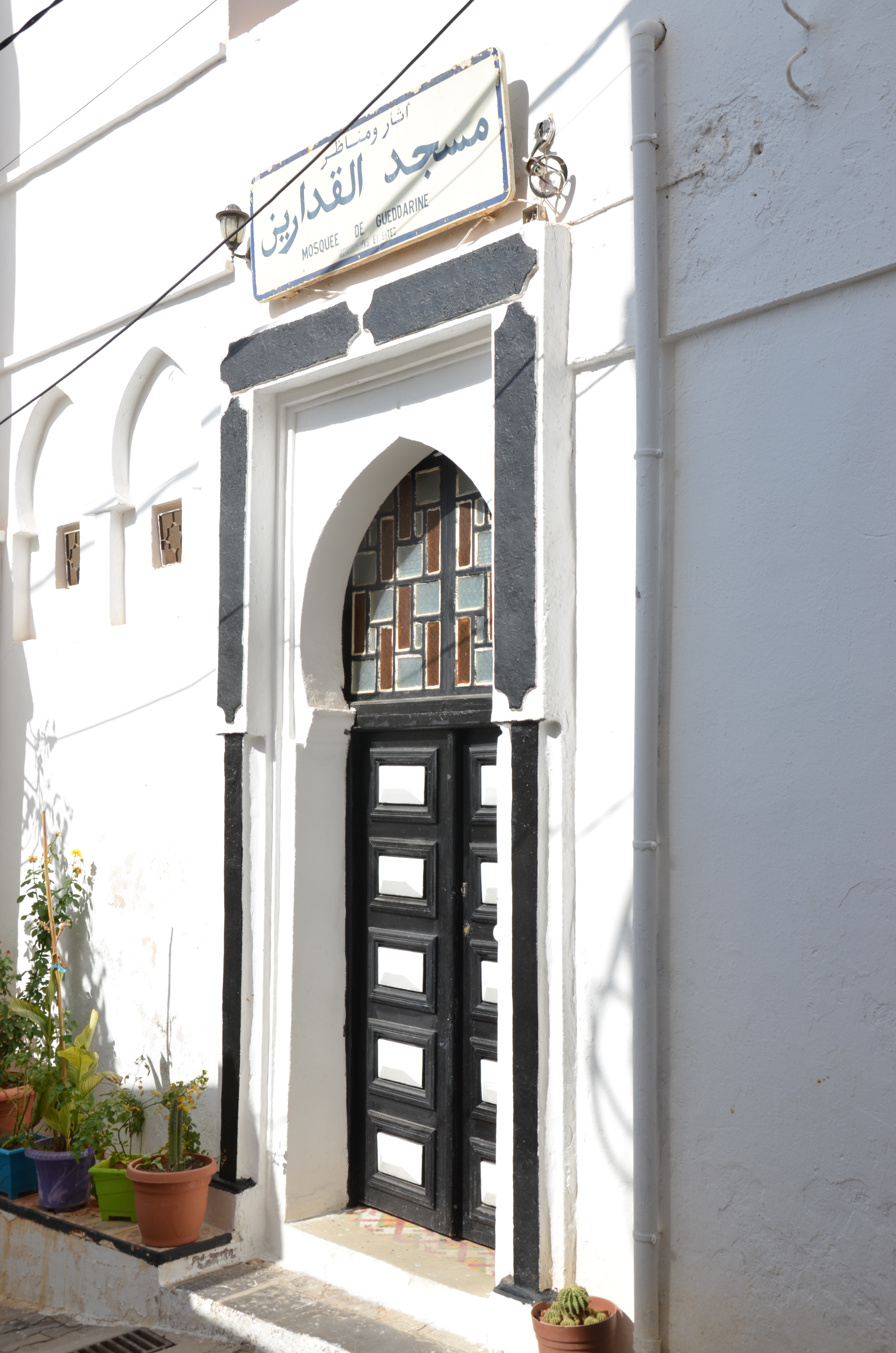
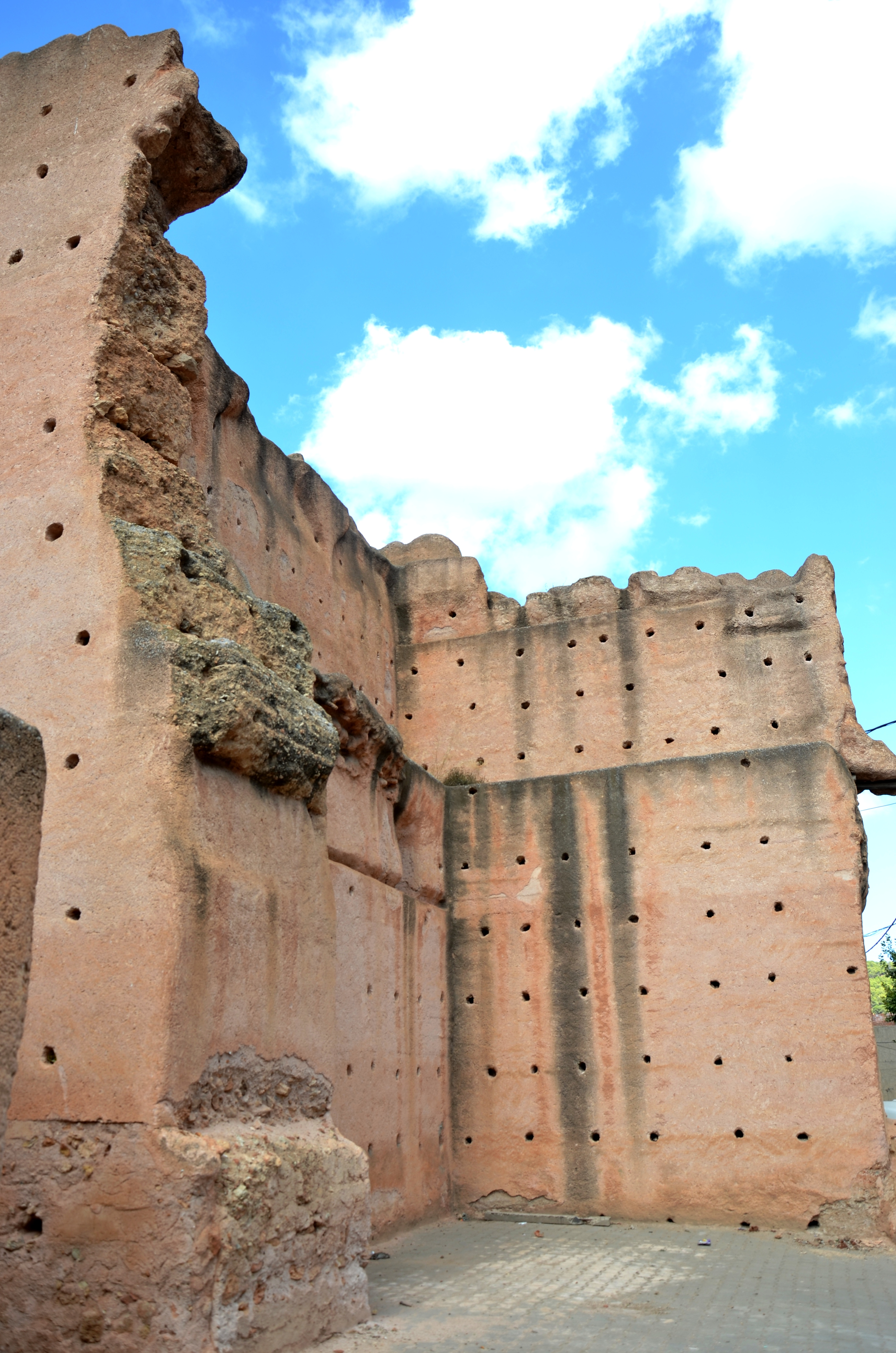
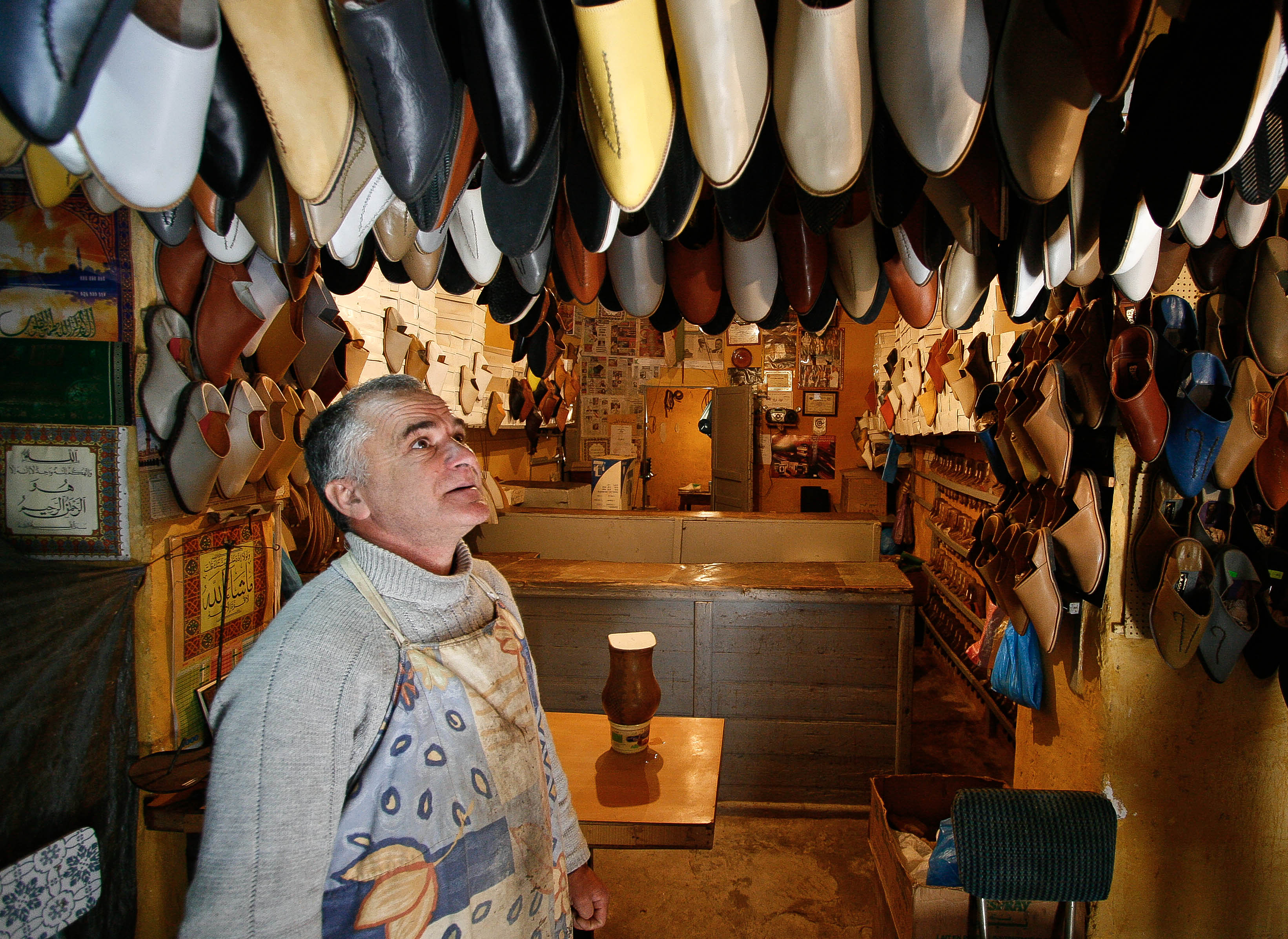

- Location within Algeria
- Coordinates: 35°0′42″N 01°44′56″W
- Country: Algeria
- Province: Tlemcen
- District: Nedroma

Area
  - Total: 14 km^{2} (5.4 sq mi)

Population (2008 census)
  - Total: 32,398
  - Density: 2,300/km^{2} (6,000/sq mi)
- Time zone: UTC+1 (CET)
- Postal code: 13600

Nedroma (Arabic: ندرومة) is a city in Tlemcen Province, in northwestern Algeria, about 77 kilometres (48 mi) from Tlemcen. Once the capital of Trara, it was built on the ruins of a Berber town by Abd al-Mu'min the Almohad caliph. It has a great Islamic history, with its Great Mosque of Nedroma once containing the earliest surviving Almoravid minbar. Nedroma became a UNESCO World Heritage in 2002 for its cultural importance.

== History ==
Many families of Andalusian and Moorish origin sought refuge in this city during the Reconquista.

In the book Al-Istibsar fi 'agaib al-Amsar, written in the late 12th century, the author described Nedroma as: "A beautiful city with abundant crops and fruits, and its prices are inexpensive. It has fertile plains and many farms. The city is about 10 miles from the sea. On its coast, there is a flowing river rich in fruit-bearing trees. It also has a safe and well-frequented harbor."

At the beginning of the 16th century, Nedroma became an important textile center, specializing in cotton wovens and blankets. Nedroma, although far from Algiers, was an administrative center of the Trara, extending its influence to neighboring towns. The Andalusian influence is also due to the second wave of Morisco refugees from Spain, following the decree of Expulsion of the Moriscos in 1609. Spanish-Arab philologist Guillermo Rittwagen described the city as having maintained its Andalusian heritage.

At the beginning of the 19th century, it had 2,500 to 3,000 inhabitants, it was among the small towns of precolonial Algeria like Kalaa and Mazouna. Its population is made up notably of exiles from Spain and a minority of Jews

Once the capital of Trara, it was built on the ruins of a Berber town by Abd al-Mu'min the Almohad caliph, who himself was a native of the neighboring mountains. the town has a great history of Islam. The earliest surviving Almoravid minbar, dated to around A.H. 479, once belonged to the Great Mosque of Nedroma. It is now on display in the National Museum of Antiquities and Islamic Art in Algiers. In the 1930s Ulama organizations, particularly the Boy Scouts sprang up in Nedroma and other ancient cities of the interior such as Tlemcen and Constantine.

Riots broke out in the town on 15 October 1953, killing one person and injuring several. 26 were convicted.

Nedroma was added to the UNESCO World Heritage Tentative List on December 30, 2002, in the Cultural category.

== Geography ==
Nedroma is situated to the north of the Trara Hills, 77 kilometres (48 mi) from Tlemcen, and about 340 kilometres (210 mi) west of Algiers. The N99 highway passes south–north through the town, connecting it to Maghnia in the south and Ghazaouet on the coast. The W100 road leads to El Houanet in the southwest, and the W38 road leads to Aïn Kebira and Bentalha in the northeast.

== Landmarks ==
Nedroma contains the Great Mosque of Nedroma (Sidi Yahia Mosque) and the Nedroma Hospital in the northern outskirts along the N99. Baked brick is a common building material in the town.
