= Raja Meziane =

Algerian singer, songwriter, lawyer and activist

Raja Meziane رجاء مزيان
- Born: 31 December 1988 (age 37); Maghnia, Algeria
- Genres: Rap; pop
- Occupations: Singer, songwriter, lawyer, activist
- Instrument: Voice

Raja Meziane (Arabic: رجاء مزيان; born 1988), is an Algerian singer, songwriter, lawyer, and activist.

== Life ==
Meziane was born in 1988 in Maghnia, a town in Tlemcen Province in north-west Algeria, where she grew up in the city of Chouhada. Her father, Ahmed ("H'mida") Meziane, a college professor of natural sciences, died young from a cardiac disease when she was eight years old. Initiated to music and theatre among scouts, she recorded her first album of children's songs at the age of 16.

In 2007, as a law student at the université de Tlemcen, she entered the talent show Alhane wa chabab in which she was a finalist. After releasing two albums, with some songs criticising the regime, in 2013 she attempted to make a feature film for which she wrote the screenplay and the music of the soundtrack. Unable to finance this project, she decided to devote herself to her job as a lawyer. However, the bâtonnier of Algiers refused, with no explanation, to issue her with a practice certificate.

Having not succeeded in either art or law, in 2015 she moved to the Czech Republic, where she found an environment conducive to the development of her artistic career.

On October, 2019 Meziane was listed as one of the BBC's 100 most influential women of the year.

"Singer Raja Meziane's political music video Allo le Système! has been viewed more than 35 million times on YouTube". "Her anti-government songs tackling social injustice, alleged corruption and inequality have seen her forced into exile from Algeria". "Now based in Prague, she is a vocal supporter of Algeria's protests in 2019, which have seen tens of thousands of young people taking to the streets calling for change".

—
