= Nedroma District =

Coordinates: 34.8546°N 1.7248°W

Nedroma District دائرة Tlemcen
- District
- Map of Algeria highlighting Tlemcen Province
- Country: Algeria
- Province: Tlemcen
- District seat: Nedroma
- Time zone: UTC+01 (CET)

Nedroma District is a district of Tlemcen Province in north-western Algeria.

The district is further divided into 3 municipalities:

- Nedroma
- Djebala
