= Maghnia District =

Coordinates: 34.8333°N 1.7167°W

Maghnia District دائرة مغنية
- District
- Country: Algeria
- Province: Tlemcen
- District seat: Maghnia
- Time zone: UTC+01 (CET)

Maghnia District is a district of Tlemcen Province in north-western Algeria.

The district is further divided into 3 municipalities:

- Maghnia
- Hammam Boughrara
