= Terny Beni Hdiel =

Terny Beni Hdiel تيرنى بنى ھديل ⵜⵉⵔⵏⵉ ⴱⵏⵉ ⵀⴷⵉⵢⴻⵍ
- Commune and town

- Location within Algeria
- Coordinates: 34.79583°N 1.35812°W
- Country: Algeria
- Province: Tlemcen Province
- District: Mansourah District

Population (2008)
  - Total: 5,737
- Time zone: UTC+1 (CET)

Terny Beni Hdiel is a town and commune in Tlemcen Province in north-western Algeria.
