= Bensekrane District =

Bensekrane District دائرة بن سكران
- District
- Country: Algeria
- Province: Tlemcen
- District seat: Bensekrane

Population (2008)
  - Total: 32,067
- Time zone: UTC+01 (CET)

Bensekrane District is a district of Tlemcen Province in north-western Algeria.

== Municipalities ==
The district is further divided into 2 municipalities:

- Bensekrane
- Sidi Abdelli
