= Bensekrane =

Bensekrane بن سكران
- Commune and town

- Location within Algeria
- Coordinates: 35°4′N 1°13′W
- Country: Algeria
- Province: Tlemcen Province
- District: Bensekrane District

Population (2008)
  - Total: 13,130
- Time zone: UTC+1 (CET)

Bensekrane is a town and commune in Tlemcen Province in northwestern Algeria.
