= Aïn Nehala =

Coordinates: 35°01′38″N 0°55′56″W

- Commune and town
- Interactive map of Aïn Nehala
- Country: Algeria
- Province: Tlemcen Province
- Time zone: UTC+1 (CET)

Aïn Nehala is a town and commune in Tlemcen Province in northwestern Algeria.
