= Ouled Mimoun =

Ouled Mimoun أولاد ميمون
- Commune and town

- Location within Algeria
- Coordinates: 34°54′N 1°02′W
- Country: Algeria
- Province: Tlemcen Province
- District: Ouled Mimoun District

Population (2008)
  - Total: 26,389
- Time zone: UTC+1 (CET)

Ouled Mimoun is a town and commune in Tlemcen Province in north-western Algeria.
