= Beni Mester =

Coordinates: 34°52′N 1°25′W

- Commune and town
- Interactive map of Beni Mester
- Country: Algeria
- Province: Tlemcen Province
- Time zone: UTC+1 (CET)

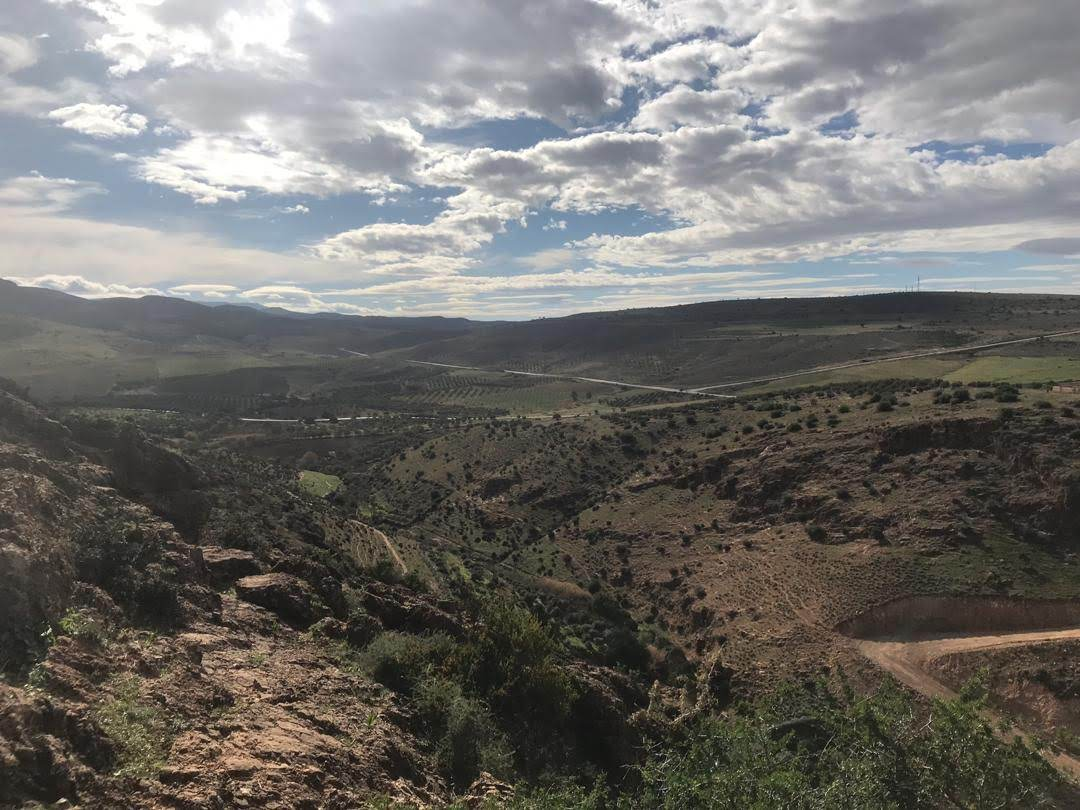
Hillside in Beni Mester

Beni Mester is a town and commune in Tlemcen Province in northwestern Algeria.
