= Souani =

Coordinates: 34°55′16″N 1°54′59″W

- Commune and town
- Interactive map of Souani
- Country: Algeria
- Province: Tlemcen Province
- Time zone: UTC+1 (CET)

Souani (Arabic: السواني) is a town and commune in Tlemcen Province in north-western Algeria.
