= Aïn Youcef =

- Commune and town
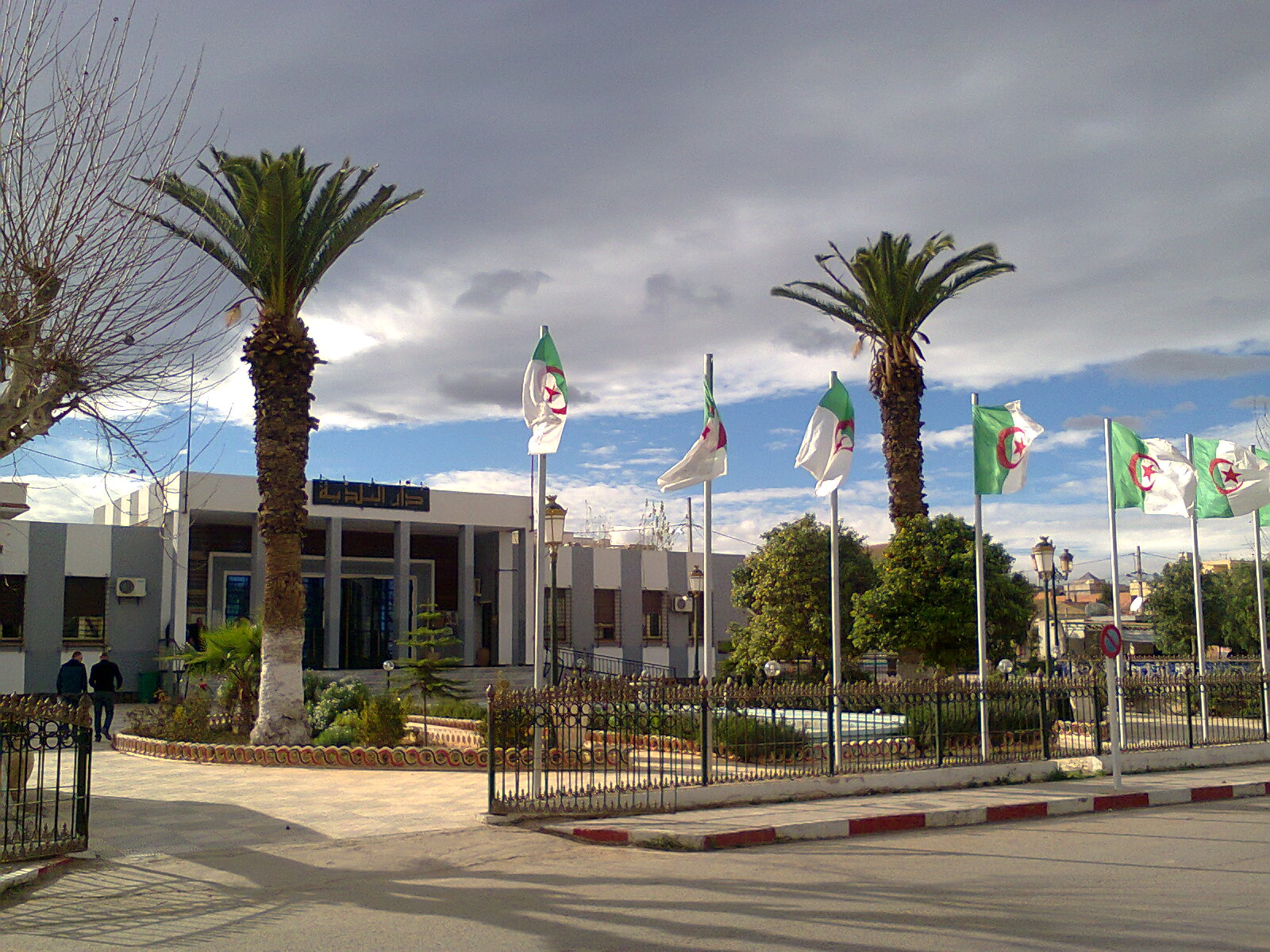

- Location within Algeria
- Country: Algeria
- Province: Tlemcen Province

Population (2008)
  - Total: 13,234
- Time zone: UTC+1 (CET)
- Postal Code: 13510

Aïn Youcef is a town and commune in Tlemcen Province in northwestern Algeria.
