= Dar Yaghmouracene =

- Commune and town
- Location within Algeria
- Coordinates: 35°06′02″N 1°48′03″W
- Country: Algeria
- Province: Tlemcen Province
- Time zone: UTC+1 (CET)

Dar Yaghmouracene is a town and commune in Tlemcen Province in northwestern Algeria.

== See also ==
- Yaghmurasan Ibn Zyan
