= Marsa Ben M'Hidi =

Marsa Ben M'Hidi مرسى بن مھيدي
- Commune and town
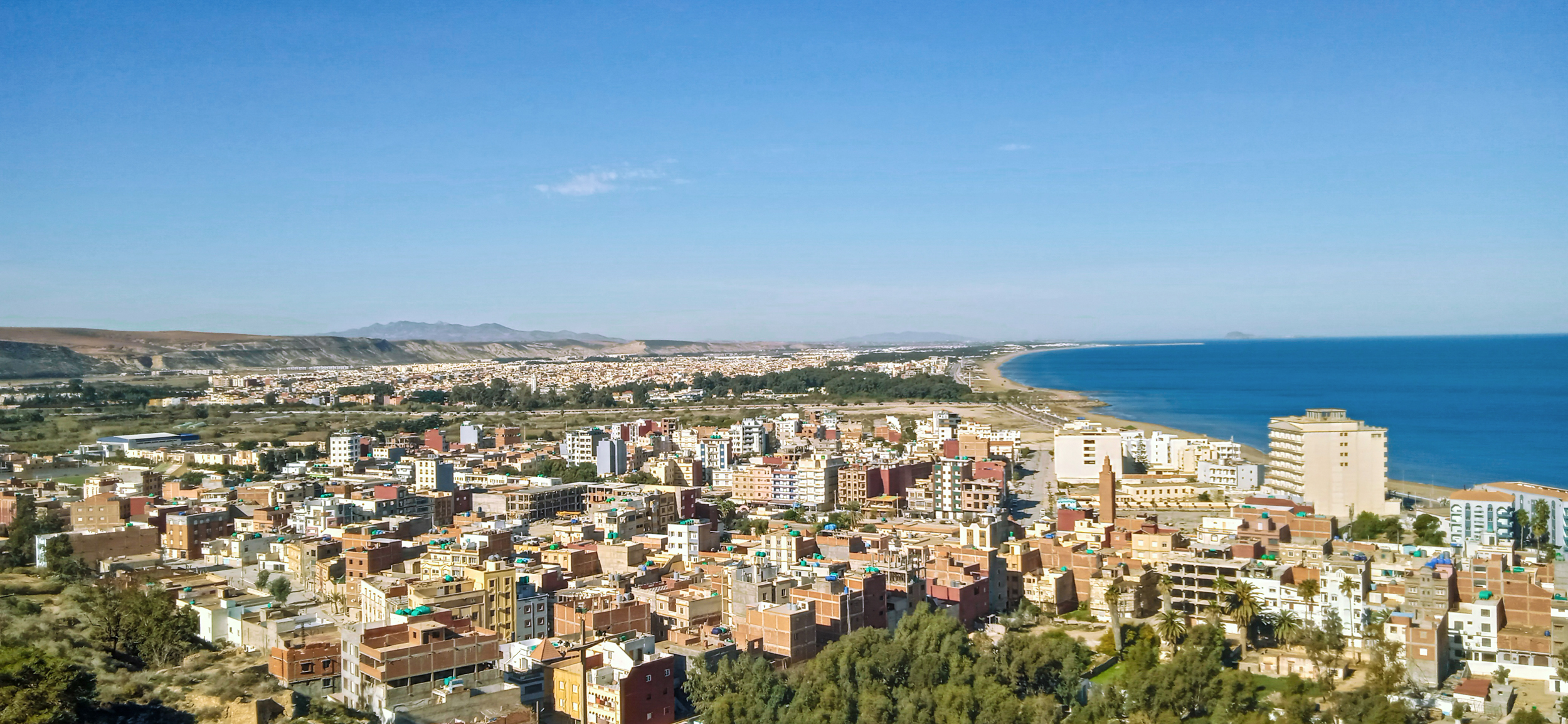
- The view of Marsa Ben M'hidi with the city of Saïdia (Morocco) in the background.

- Location within Algeria
- Coordinates: 35°4′54″N 2°12′17″W
- Country: Algeria
- Province: Tlemcen Province

Population (2008)
  - Total: 6,212
- Time zone: UTC+1 (CET)

Marsa Ben M'Hidi is a town and commune in Tlemcen Province in northwestern Algeria, located next to the border with Morocco.
