= Souk Tlata =

- Commune and town
- Coordinates: 35°1′26″N 2°0′0″W
- Country: Algeria
- Province: Tlemcen Province
- Time zone: UTC+1 (CET)

Souk Tlata is a town and commune in Tlemcen Province in north-western Algeria.
