= Beni Khellad =

Coordinates: 35°10′21″N 1°33′26″W

Beni Khellad بني خلاد
- Commune and town
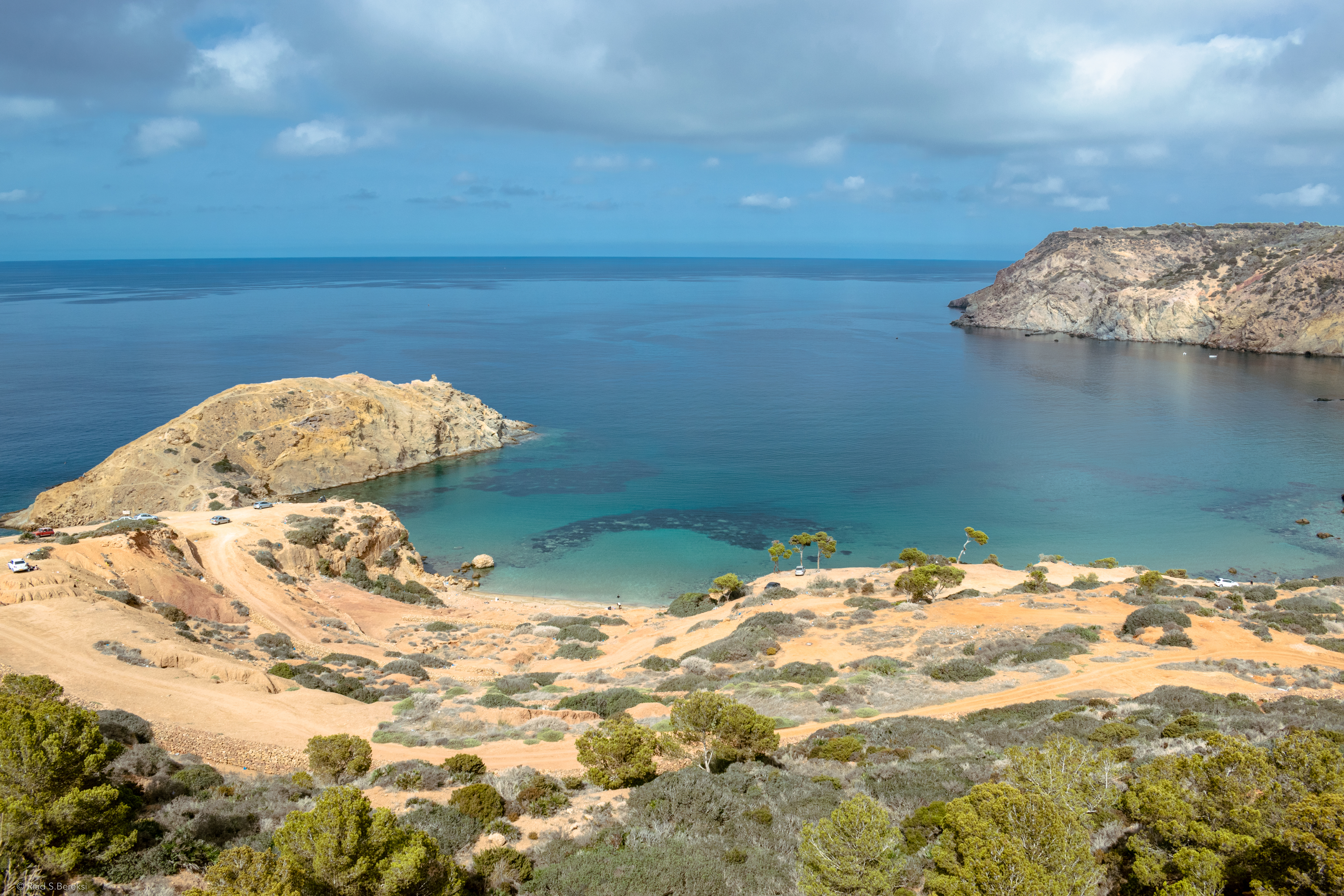
- Interactive map of Beni Khellad
- Country: Algeria
- Province: Tlemcen Province
- Time zone: UTC+1 (CET)

Beni Khellad is a town and commune in Tlemcen Province in northwestern Algeria.
