= Djebala =

Coordinates: 34°58′35″N 47°42′02″E

- Commune and town
- Interactive map of Djebala
- Country This is shown on Google Earth as in Iran: Algeria
- Province: Tlemcen Province
- Time zone: UTC+1 (CET)

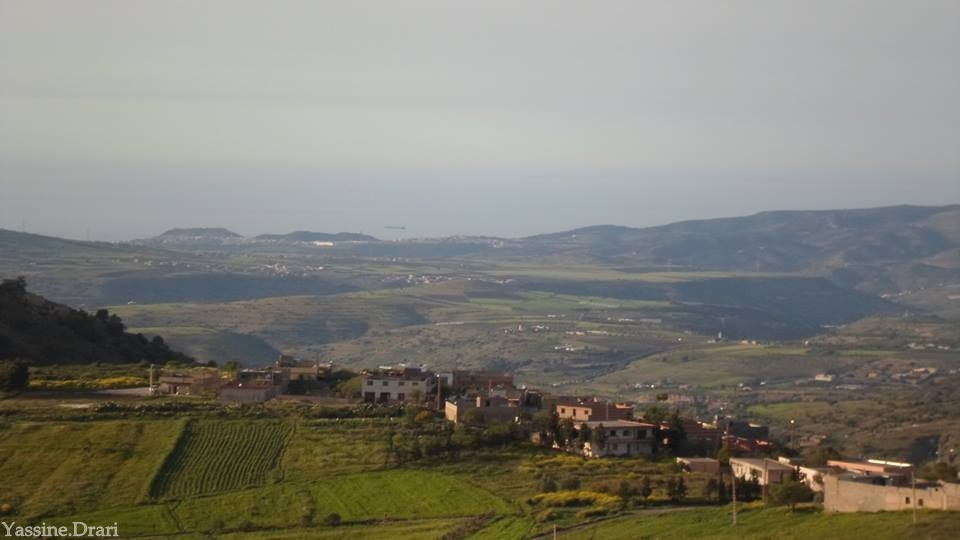
A view of the village from the sky.

Djebala is a town and commune in Tlemcen Province in northwestern Algeria.
