= Bouhlou, Algeria =

Coordinates: 36°26′N 1°44′E

Bouhlou
- Commune and town
- Interactive map of Bouhlou
- Country: Algeria
- Province: Tlemcen Province
- Time zone: UTC+1 (CET)

Bouhlou is a town and commune in Tlemcen Province in northwestern Algeria.
