= Zenata, Algeria =

Coordinates: 34°59′04″N 1°27′30″W

Zenata زناتة
- Commune and town
- Interactive map of Zenata
- Country: Algeria
- Province: Tlemcen Province
- Time zone: UTC+1 (CET)

Zenata (Arabic: زناتة, romanized: Zanāta) is a town and commune in Tlemcen Province in north-western Algeria.
