= Bab El Assa =

Coordinates: 34°58′N 2°02′W

- Commune and town
- Interactive map of Bab El Assa
- Country: Algeria
- Province: Tlemcen Province
- Time zone: UTC+1 (CET)

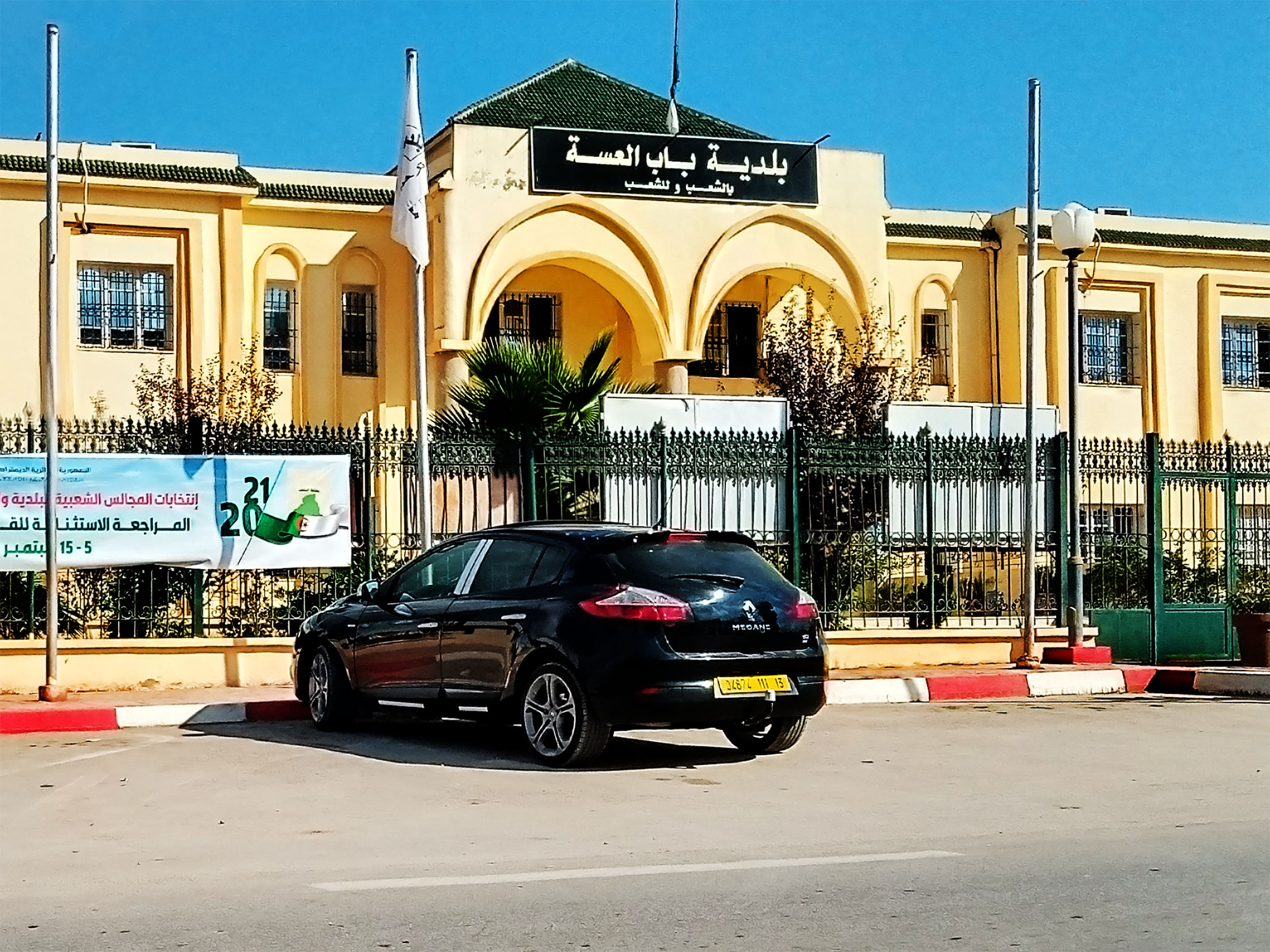

Bab El Assa is a town and commune in Tlemcen Province in northwestern Algeria.
