= Ouled Riyah =

Coordinates: 34°57′45″N 1°29′50″W

- Commune and town
- Interactive map of Ouled Riyah
- Country: Algeria
- Province: Tlemcen Province
- Time zone: UTC+1 (CET)

Ouled Riyah is a town and commune in Tlemcen Province in north-western Algeria.
