= Tienet =

Tienet تيانت
- Commune and town

- Location within Algeria
- Coordinates: 35°2′58″N 1°50′20″W
- Country: Algeria
- Province: Tlemcen Province

Area
  - Total: 8.1 sq mi (21 km^{2})

Population (2008)
  - Total: 4,493
- Time zone: UTC+1 (CET)
- Website: www.apc-tient.dz

Tienet is a town and commune in Tlemcen Province in north-western Algeria.
