= Beni Bahdel =

Coordinates: 34°43′N 1°31′W

- Commune and town
- Interactive map of Beni Bahdel
- Country: Algeria
- Province: Tlemcen Province
- Time zone: UTC+1 (CET)

Beni Bahdel is a town and commune in Tlemcen Province in northwestern Algeria.
