= Aïn Ghoraba =

Coordinates: 34°42′50″N 1°23′21″W

- Commune and town
- Location of Aïn Ghoraba within Tlemcen Province
- Country: Algeria
- Province: Tlemcen Province

Population (2008)
  - Total: 5,068
- Time zone: UTC+1 (CET)
- Postal Code: 13130

Aïn Ghoraba is a town and commune in Tlemcen Province in northwestern Algeria.
