= Remchi =

- Commune and town
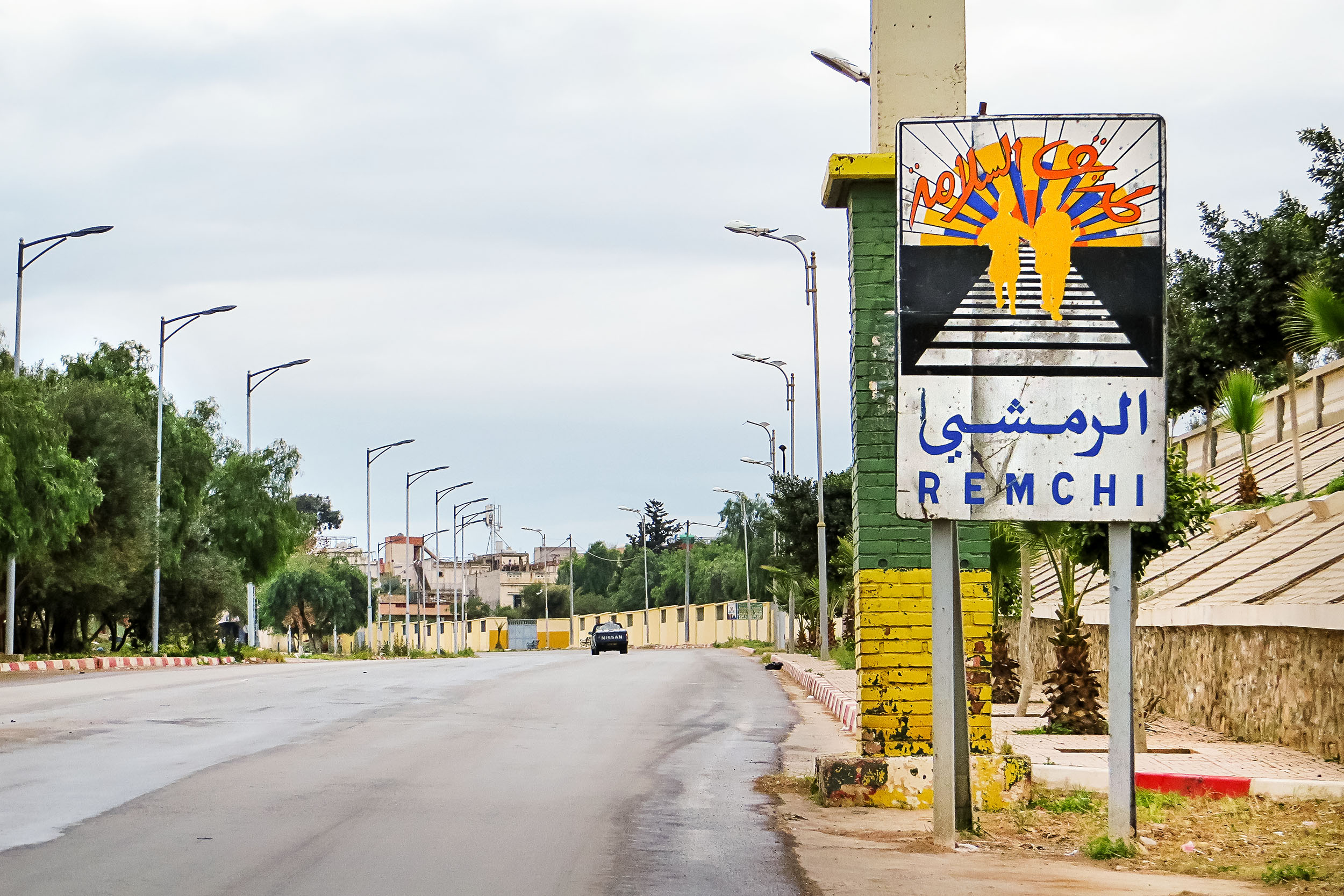

- Location within Algeria
- Country: Algeria
- Province: Tlemcen Province

Population (2008)
  - Total: 31,837
- Time zone: UTC+1 (CET)

Remchi is a town and commune in Tlemcen Province in north-western Algeria.
