= Hammam Boughrara =

Coordinates: 34°54′N 1°38′W

- Commune and town
- Interactive map of Hammam Boughrara
- Country: Algeria
- Province: Tlemcen Province
- Time zone: UTC+1 (CET)

Hammam Boughrara is a town and commune in Tlemcen Province in northwestern Algeria.
