= Sabra, Algeria =

Sabra
- Commune and town
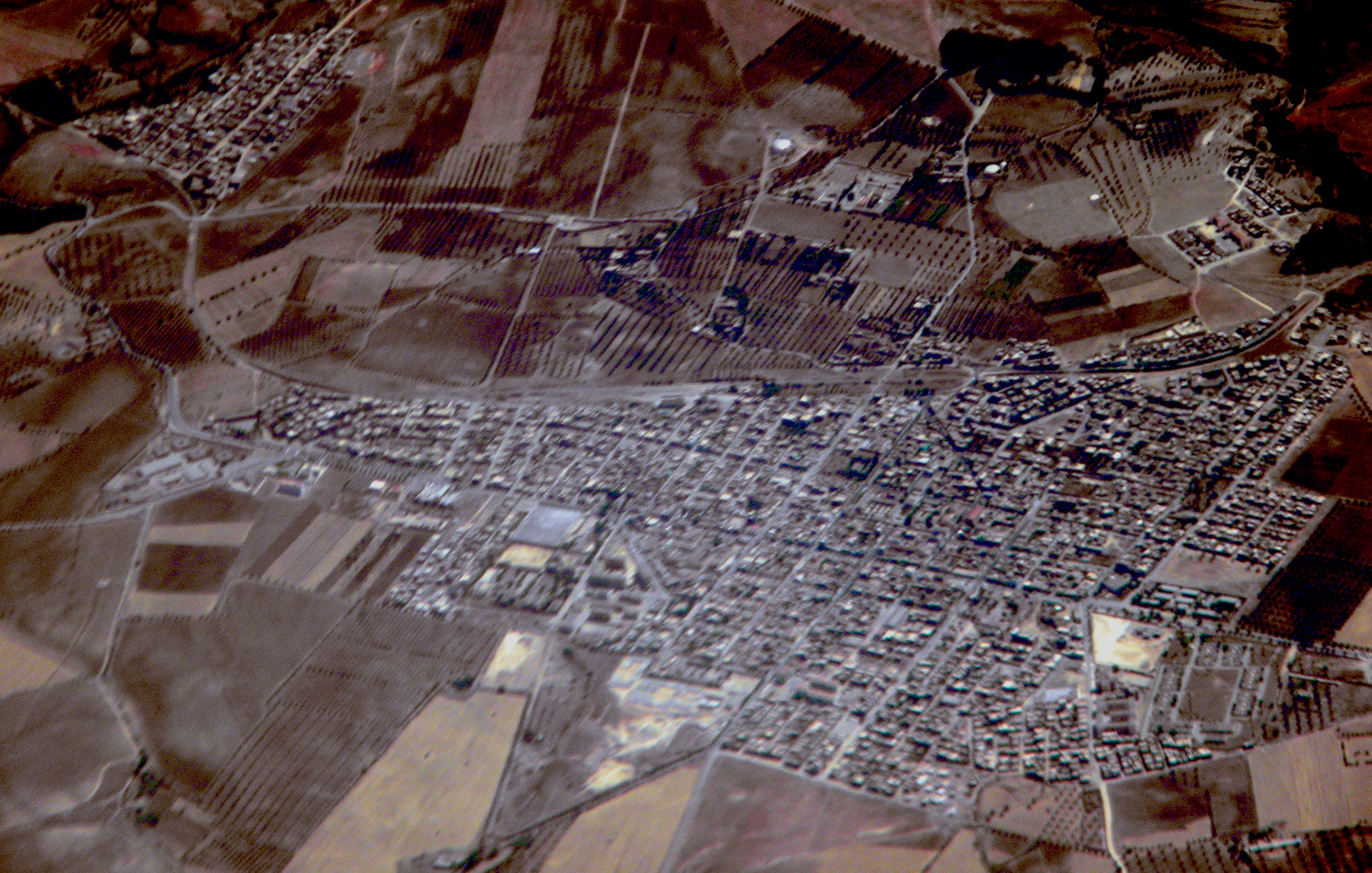

- Location within Algeria
- Coordinates: 34°49′38.57″N 1°31′41.74″W
- Country: Algeria
- Province: Tlemcen Province

Population (2008)
  - Total: 28,555
- Time zone: UTC+1 (CET)
- Postal code: 13310

Sabra (formerly Turenne during the French colonization) is a commune of Tlemcen in Algeria., it has a famous water source called ain sabra
