= Oued Lakhdar =

Coordinates: 34°52′34″N 1°07′56″W

- Commune and town
- Interactive map of Oued Lakhdar
- Country: Algeria
- Province: Tlemcen Province
- Time zone: UTC+1 (CET)

Oued Lakhdar is a town and commune in Tlemcen Province in north-western Algeria.
