= Mansoura, Tlemcen =

Coordinates: 34°52′16″N 1°20′21″W

Mansourah
- Commune and town
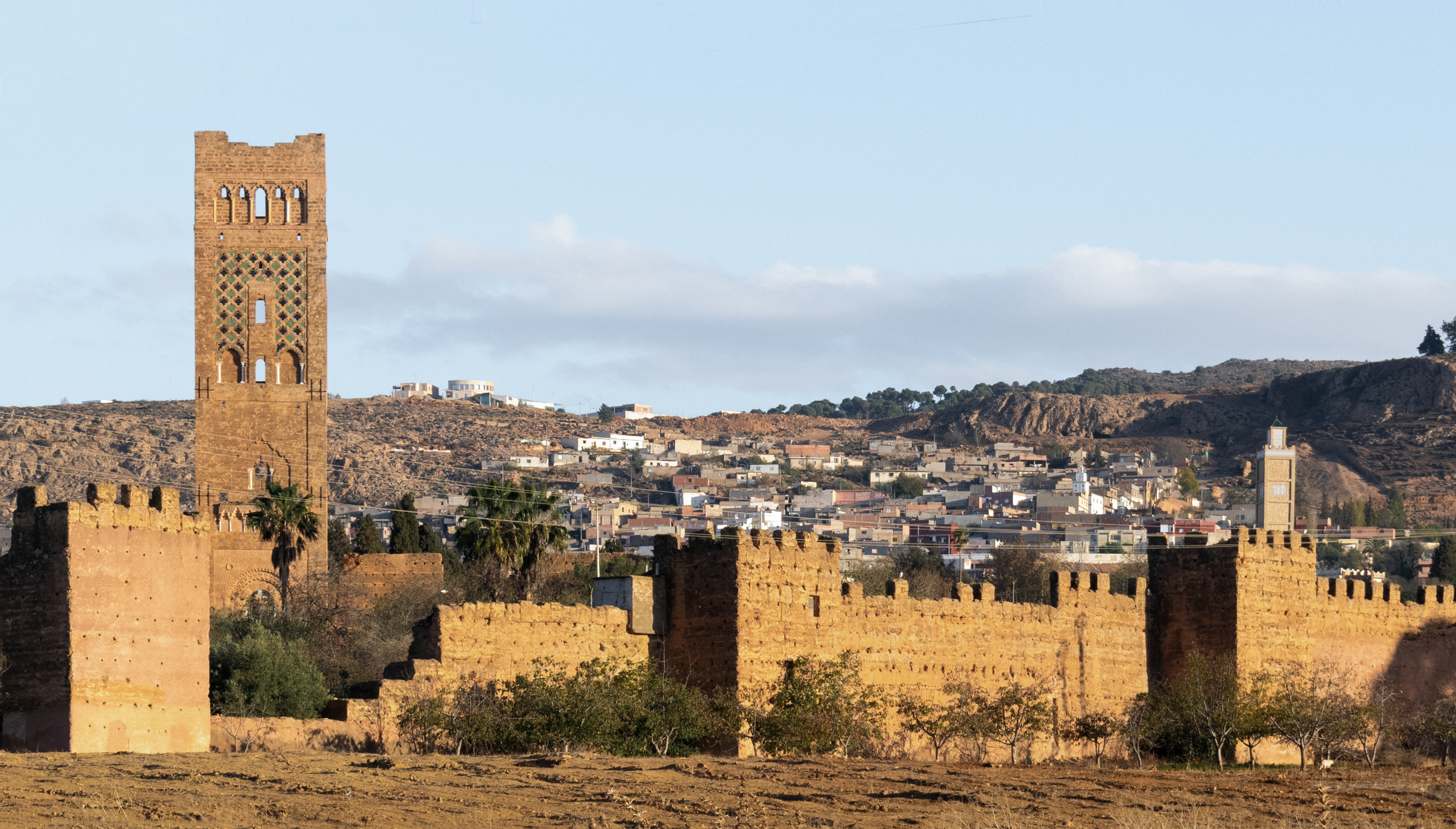

- Country: Algeria
- Province: Tlemcen Province
- District: Mansourah District

Population (2008)
  - Total: 49,150
- Time zone: UTC+1 (CET)

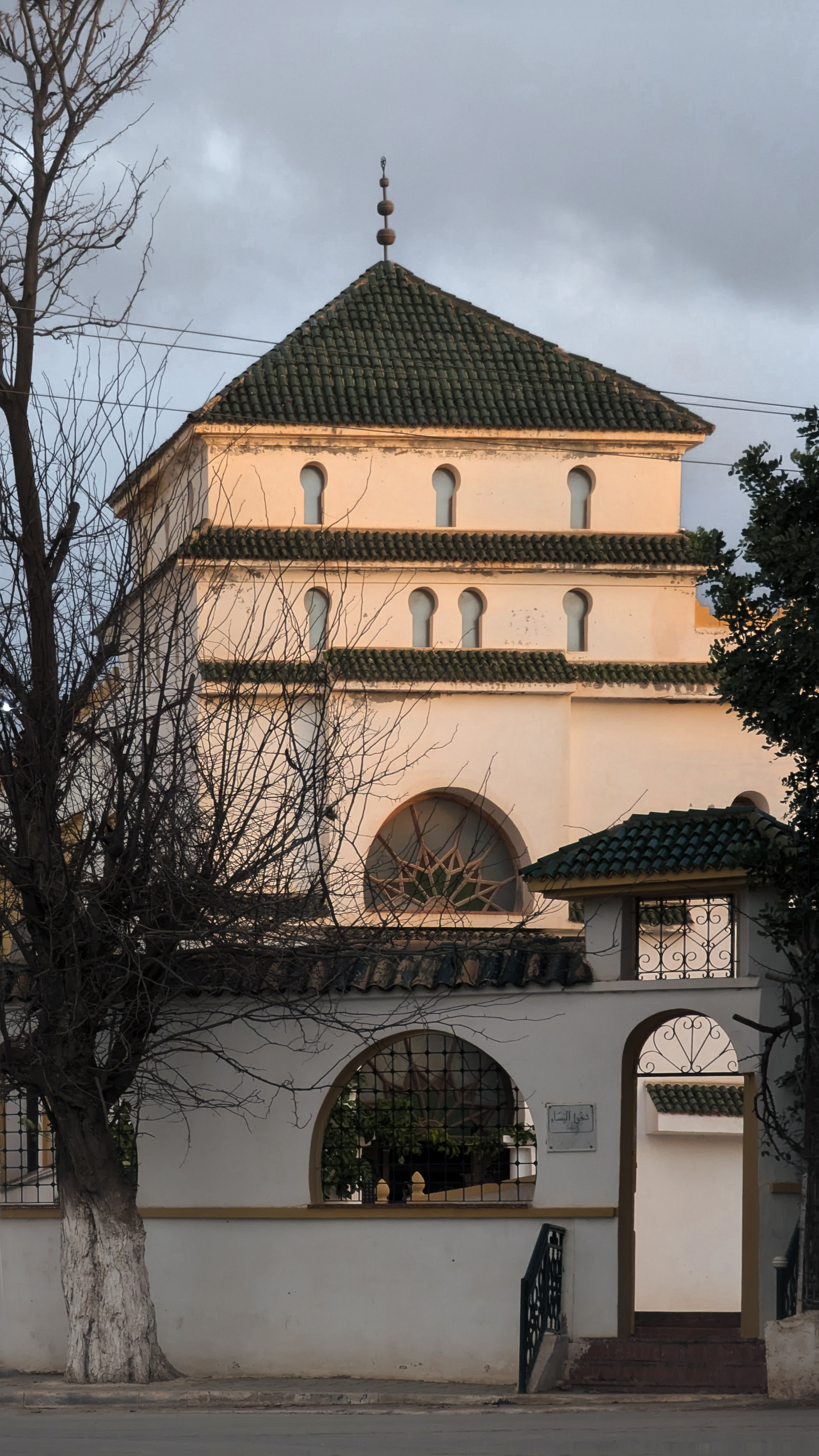
Entrance of the mosque in the town

Mansourah (Arabic: المنصورة) is a town and commune in Tlemcen Province in Northwestern Algeria. The town is the seat of Mansourah District.

== Population ==
According to the 2008 census, the town has a population of 49,007 inhabitants, and in total, its commune has 49,150 inhabitants.

The town is effectively a suburb of the provincial capital Tlemcen. Mansourah and Tlemcen together form an intercommunal urban agglomeration with 173,531 inhabitants.

== Landmarks ==
The main landmark of Mansourah is the Tlemcen National Park with the ruins of the fortified city and the Mansourah Mosque. They include parts of the walls of the city, better-preserved walls of the castle, and its leading tower.

== Localities ==
The District of Mansourah is composed of 8 localities (1984):

- Mansourah
- Imama
- Béni Boublène
- Wone Ouest
- ZHUN Champ de tir
- Kifan Sud-Ouest
- Attar
- Ouali Mustapha (Riat El Kébir)
