= Hennaya =

Coordinates: 34°57′N 1°22′W

- Commune and town
- Interactive map of Hennaya
- Country: Algeria
- Province: Tlemcen Province

Population (2008)
  - Total: 26,515
- Time zone: UTC+1 (CET)

Children flourishing near a generous nature, where organic agriculture finds its place.

Hennaya is a town and commune in Tlemcen Province in northwestern Algeria.
