= Sebaa Chioukh =

Sebaa Chioukh السبعة شيوخ
- Commune and town
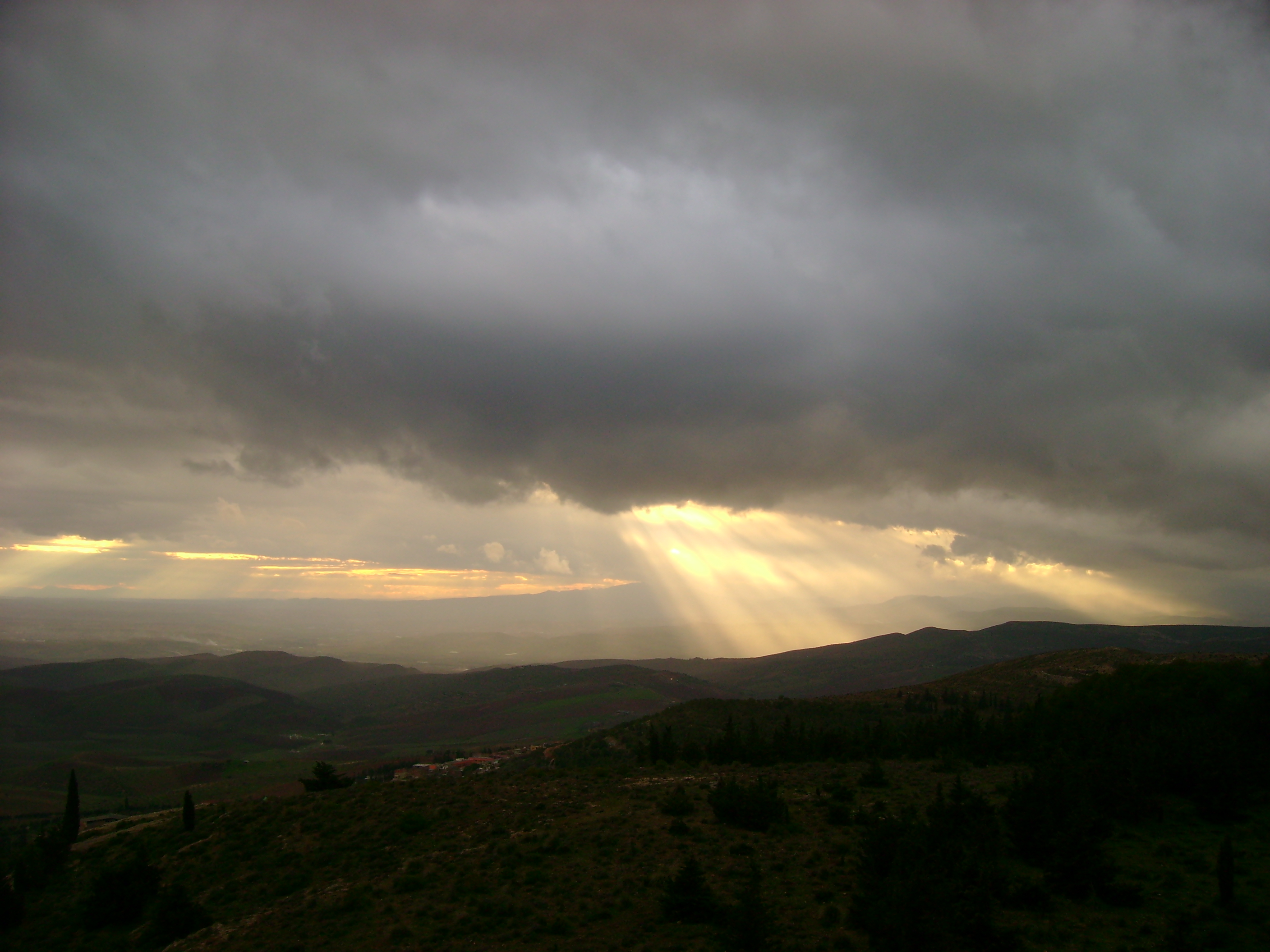

- Location within Algeria
- Coordinates: 35°09′22″N 1°21′21″W
- Country: Algeria
- Province: Tlemcen Province

Population (2008)
  - Total: 4,634
- Time zone: UTC+1 (CET)

Sebaa Chioukh is a town and commune in Tlemcen Province in north-western Algeria.
