= Aïn Fetah =

Coordinates: 34°57′56″N 1°38′19″W

Aïn Fetah Boutrak
- Commune and town
- Location of Aïn Fetah within Tlemcen Province
- Country: Algeria
- Province: Tlemcen Province

Population (2008)
  - Total: 7,352
- Time zone: UTC+1 (CET)
- Postal Code: 13028

Aïn Fetah is a town and commune in Tlemcen Province in northwestern Algeria.

== Geographic identification ==
The territory of the municipality of Aïn Fettah is located north of the wilaya of Tlemcen. Its capital, Boutrak. this Town is located approximately 30 km as the crow flies northwest of Tlemcen. Ain Fettah is a commune located on the Trara mountains at an average altitude of 300 meters in the center of the commune. Ain Fettah is close to Nedroma, Fellaoucene Maghnia, Hammam Boughara and Ouled Riyah .

== Localities of the municipality ==
The municipality of Aïn Fettah is made up of the following localities:

Aïn Fetah

Boutrak (chef-lieu)

Sidi Ali Benzemra

Hemmara

Taouia

Ouled Bellahcène

Ras Tahar

Chouachi

Souinia

Douahi

Aïn Beïda

Sellouh
