= Beni Ouarsous =

Coordinates: 35°05′00″N 1°33′26″W

- Commune and town
- Interactive map of Beni Ouarsous
- Country: Algeria
- Province: Tlemcen Province
- Time zone: UTC+1 (CET)

Beni Ouarsous is a town and commune in Tlemcen Province in northwestern Algeria.
