= El Aricha =

- Commune and town
- Interactive map of El Aricha
- Country: Algeria
- Province: El Aricha Province

Population (2008)
  - Total: 6,673
- Time zone: UTC+1 (CET)

Aricha is a small village in Northwestern Algeria and the capital of El Aricha Province. It lies at the intersection of Tlemcen Province in the north, the Wilaya de Sidi Bel Abbes to the east and south Wilaya of Naâma to the west the Moroccan border.
