= El Fehoul =

Coordinates: 35°07′00″N 1°17′40″W

- Commune and town
- Interactive map of El Fehoul
- Country: Algeria
- Province: Tlemcen Province

Government
  - Type: Democracy
- Time zone: UTC+1 (CET)
- Postal code: 13033

El Fehoul is a town and commune in Tlemcen Province in northwestern Algeria. At the 2008 census it had a population of 7,045.

El Fehoul is located in the daïra of Remchi and the wilaya of Tlemcen. Surrounded by Sebaa Chioukh, Aïn Youcef and Bensekrane, El Fehoul is located 8 kilometres (5.0 mi) northeast of Aïn Youcef, the largest city in the vicinity.

It is located 253 metres (830 ft) above sea level. Its geographical co-ordinates are 35° 7' 0" North, 1° 17' 40" West.
