= Beni Semiel =

Coordinates: 34°49′00″N 1°01′36″W

- Commune and town
- Interactive map of Beni Semiel
- Country: Algeria
- Province: Tlemcen Province
- Time zone: UTC+1 (CET)

Beni Semiel is a town and commune in Tlemcen Province in northwestern Algeria.
