= Tlemcen Province =

Province of Algeria

Tlemcen Province Arabic: ولاية تلمسان Tamazight: ⵜⴰⵡⵉⵍⴰⵢⵜ ⵏ ⵜⵍⴻⵎⵙⵉⵏ
- Province
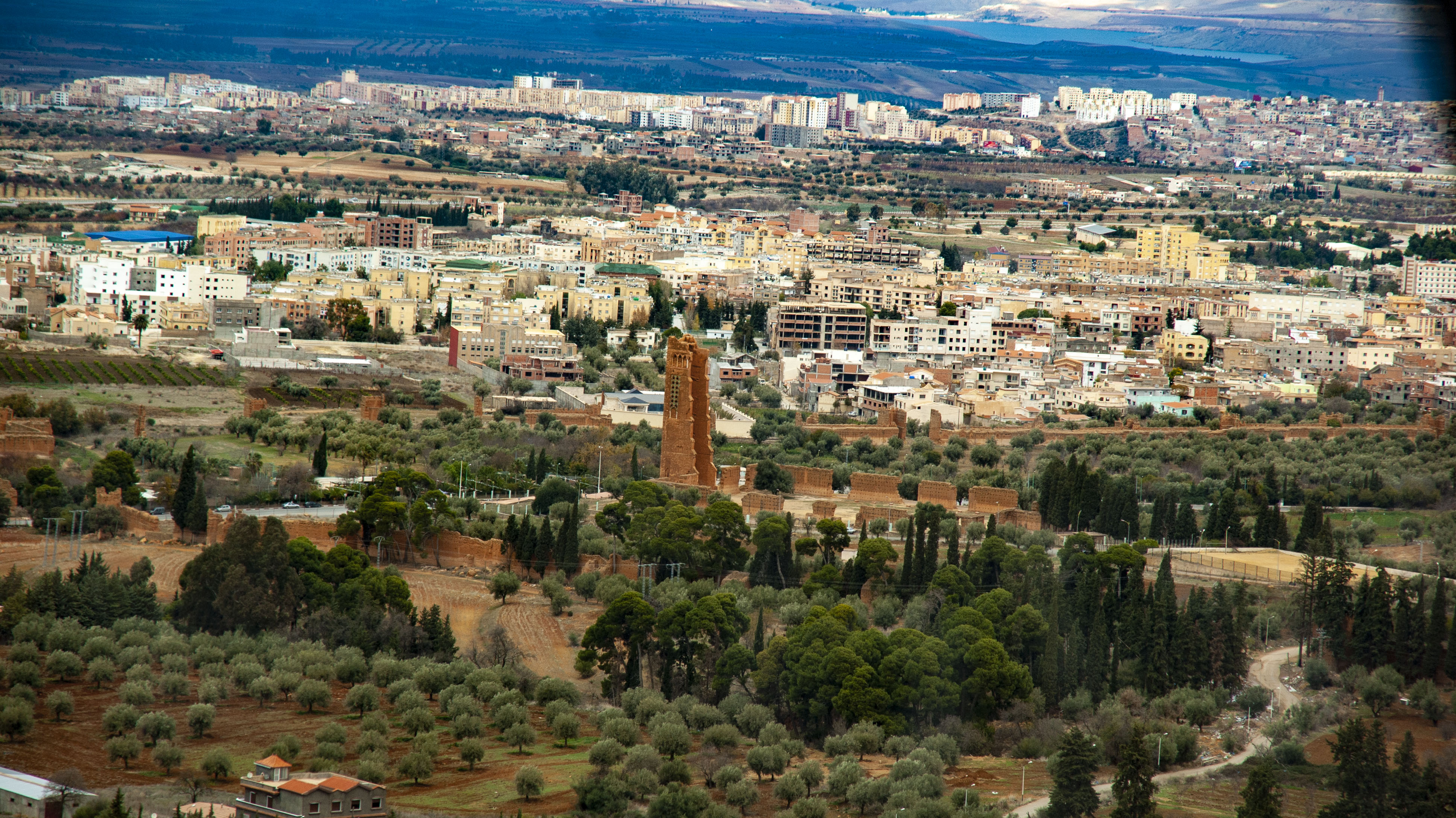
- Moscarda Beach in Marsa Ben M'Hidi

- Map of Algeria highlighting Tlemcen
- Coordinates: 34°53′N 01°19′W
- Country: Algeria
- Capital: Tlemcen

Area
  - Total: 9,061 km^{2} (3,498 sq mi)

Population (2008)
  - Total: 945,525
  - Density: 104.4/km^{2} (270.3/sq mi)
- Time zone: UTC+01 (CET)
- Area Code: +213 (0) 43
- ISO 3166 code: DZ-13
- Districts: 20
- Municipalities: 54

Tlemcen (Arabic: ولاية تلمسان, Tamazight: ⵜⴰⵡⵉⵍⴰⵢⵜ ⵏ ⵜⵍⴻⵎⵙⵉⵏ) is a province (wilaya) in northwestern Algeria. It is located southwest of Oran. According to the 2008 census, the province has a population of 945,525.

== Geography ==
Tlemcen Province lies among the Tlemcen Mountains and the Trara Mountains. The province is home to a set of agricultural plains located in its southern and western parts. The Algerian Steppes run through its south. Located in northwestern Algeria, it has an area of 9,017.69 km^{2}. It is bordered by Morocco to the west, Naama to the south, Sidi-Bel-Abbes to the east, and the Mediterranean Sea to the north. It has a Mediterranean coastline of about 120 kilometers.

=== Forestry ===
Tlemcen Province has a forest cover of 225,000 ha, consisting of forest, scrub, and brush. With an afforestation rate of 24%, the province is considered to have a forestry vocation. However, forest cover is unevenly distributed; more than 80% of silvicultural potential is concentrated in the Tlemcen Mountains.

The main forests are dominated by aleppo pines, holm oaks, thujas, junipers, cork oaks, and various other tree species. The most forested municipalities, with forest cover ranging from a third to two thirds of their territory, are located in the western parts of Tlemcen Mountains. (Beni Boussaid, Beni Snous, Beni Bahdel, Azails, Bouhlou)

=== Climate ===
The province is dominated by a Mediteranean climate throughout its land mass with hot summers and cool/dry winters. However, Tlemcen Province also includes two small pockets of semi-arid climates, one hot and the other cold. Rainfall is generally subject to inter-annual irregularity.

== History ==
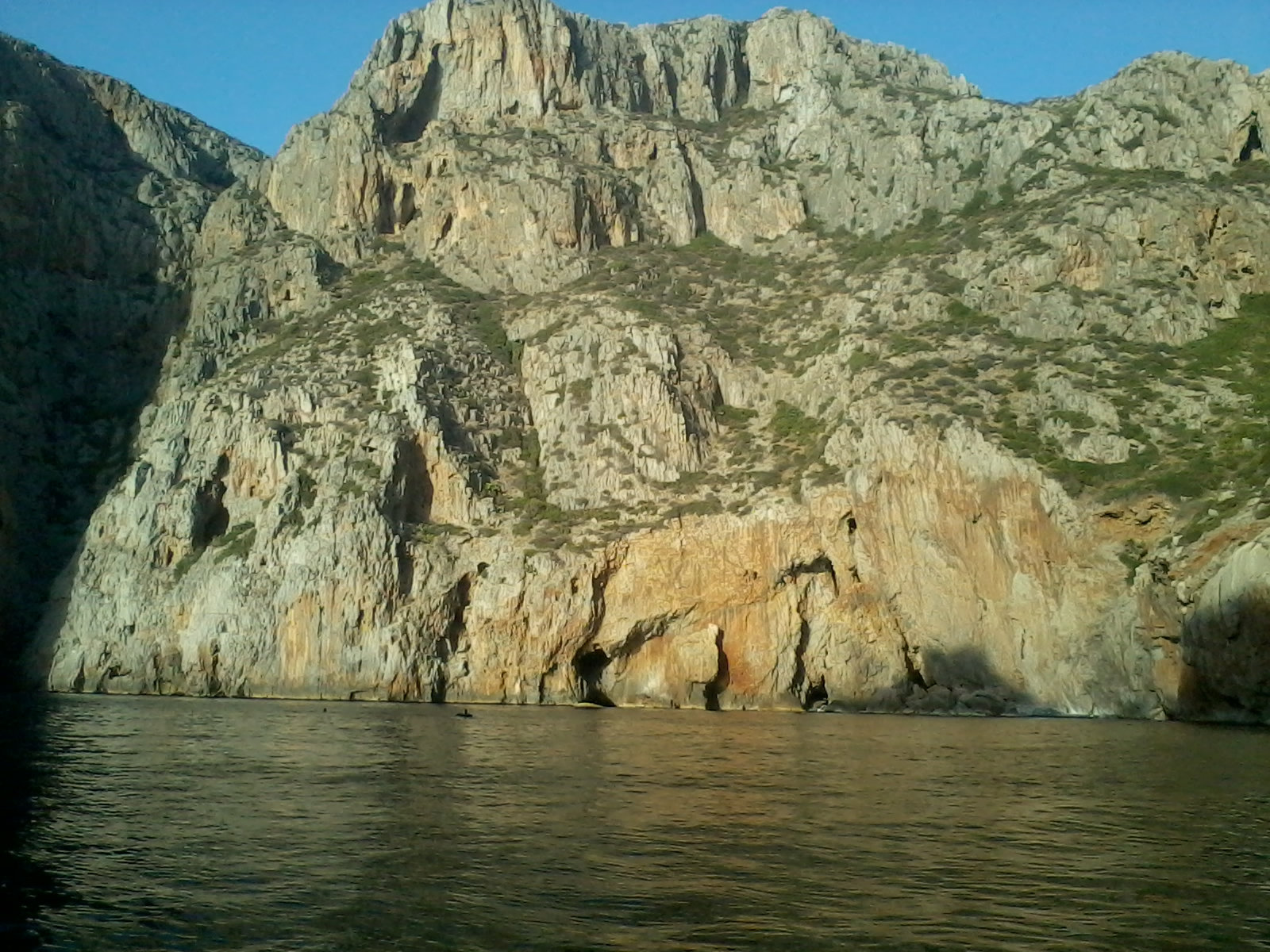
The Tlemcen Mountains

Near the end of the 2nd century, the Romans founded the ancient military outpost of Pomaria on the present-day location of Tlemcen. Over time, the region became the center of a large Christian population lasting up to the Arab invasions. By the 7th century, Islam was introduced into the region via Abu al-Muhajir Dinar, and the city of Agadir took Pomaria's place.

The region then experienced the reigns of the Almoravid and Almohad dynasties respectively. After the collapse of the Almohad dynasty, the Zayyanid dynasty, who ruled the Kingdom of Tlemcen, began their reign over the region. Shortly after, they made Tlemcen their capital. When the Zayyanids collapsed, the region became attached to the Regency of Algiers.

At the start of the French conquest of Algeria, the Treaty of Tafna in 1837 elected Emir Abdelkader as the governor of Tlemcen and surrounding areas. After the Algerian War, the province was created from the French Oran Department in 1974.

== Economy ==
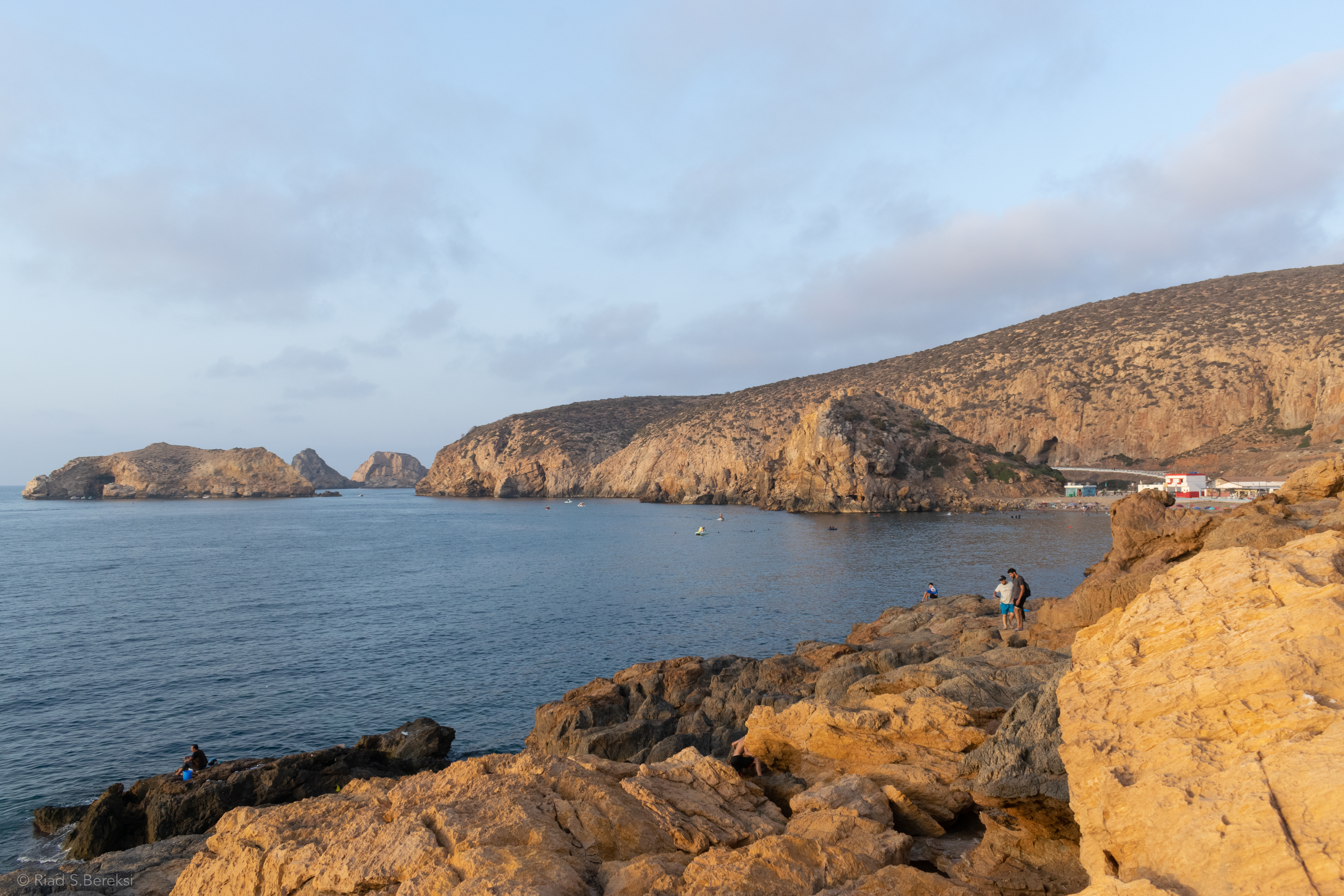
Agla Beach, Honaïne, in Tlemcen Province

Agriculture is an important economic sector in the province. The plains of Maghnia, Remchi, Hennaya, and the basins of Beni Ouarsous are the main producers of agricultural products such as potatoes, fruits, cereals, Vegetables, et ceteta. The province is known for the manufacturing of textiles, leather, carpet, cement, and fuel in major cities such as Tlemcen. The Souk Tleta Seawater Desalination Plant was inaugurated in April 2011 by the Ministry of Water Resources for President Abdelaziz Boutefilka's visit to Tlemcen.

With a coastline overlooking the Mediterranean, the province has experienced a resurgence of tourist activity since the 2000s due to the creation of tourist complexes on the province's beaches. In 2012, the province had fifty-eight hotels and 1,896 rooms within them combined.

== Administrative divisions ==
Organization of Tlemcen Province

The province is divided into 20 districts (daïras) which have existed since independence in 1962:

=== Districts ===
1. Aïn Talout
2. Bab El Assa
3. Bensekrane
4. Béni Boussaïd
5. Béni Snous
6. Chatouane
7. Felaoucene
8. Ghazaouet
9. Hennaya
10. Houanaine District (Honaine)
11. Maghnia
12. Mansourah
13. Marsa Ben M'Hidi
14. Nedroma
15. Ouled Mimoun
16. Remchi
17. Sabra
18. Sebdou
19. Sidi Djillali
20. Tlemcen

=== Communes ===
1. Ain Fetah (Ain Fettah)
2. Ain Fezza
3. Ain Ghoraba
4. Ain Kebira
5. Ain Nehala
6. Ain Tellout (Ain Tallout)
7. Ain Youcef
8. Amieur
9. Azails
10. Bab El Assa
11. Beni Bahdel
12. Beni Boussaid
13. Beni Khellad (Formerly Souk El Khemis)
14. Beni Mester
15. Beni Ouarsous
16. Beni Smiel (Beni Semiel)
17. Beni Snous
18. Bensekrane
19. Bouhlou
20. Chetouane
21. Dar Yaghmoricene (Dar Yaghmouracene)
22. Djebala
23. El Aricha
24. El Bouihi (Bouihi)
25. El Fehoul
26. El Gor
27. Fellaoucene
28. Ghazaouet
29. Hammam Boughrara
30. Hennaya
31. Honaine (Houanaine)
32. Maghnia
33. Mansourah
34. Marsa Ben Mhidi (Marsa Ben M'Hidi)
35. Msirda Fouaga
36. Nedroma
37. Oued Chouli (Oued Chouly)
38. Ouled Mimoun
39. Ouled Riyah
40. Remchi
41. Sabra
42. Sebaa Chioukh (Sebbaa Chioukh)
43. Sebdou
44. Sidi Abdelli
45. Sidi Djilali (Sidi Djillali)
46. Sidi Medjahed
47. Souahlia
48. Souani
49. Souk Thlata (Souk Tleta, Souk Tlata)
50. Terni Beni Hediel (Terny Beni Hediel, Tirni Beni Hediel)
51. Tianet
52. Tlemcen
53. Zeralda Forest
54. Zenata
