= Amieur =

Coordinates: 35°02′07″N 1°14′24″W

- Commune and town
- Country: Algeria
- Province: Tlemcen Province
- Time zone: UTC+1 (CET)

Amieur is a town and commune in Tlemcen Province in northwestern Algeria.
