= Sebdou =

Sebdou Tafraoua
- Commune and town

- Location within Algeria
- Coordinates: 34°38′22″N 1°19′37″W
- Country: Algeria
- Province: Tlemcen Province
- District: Sebdou Province

Population (2008)
  - Total: 39,800
- Time zone: UTC+1 (CET)
- Postal code: 13006

Sebdou is a town and commune in Tlemcen Province in north-western Algeria.
