= Aïn Fezza =

- Commune and town
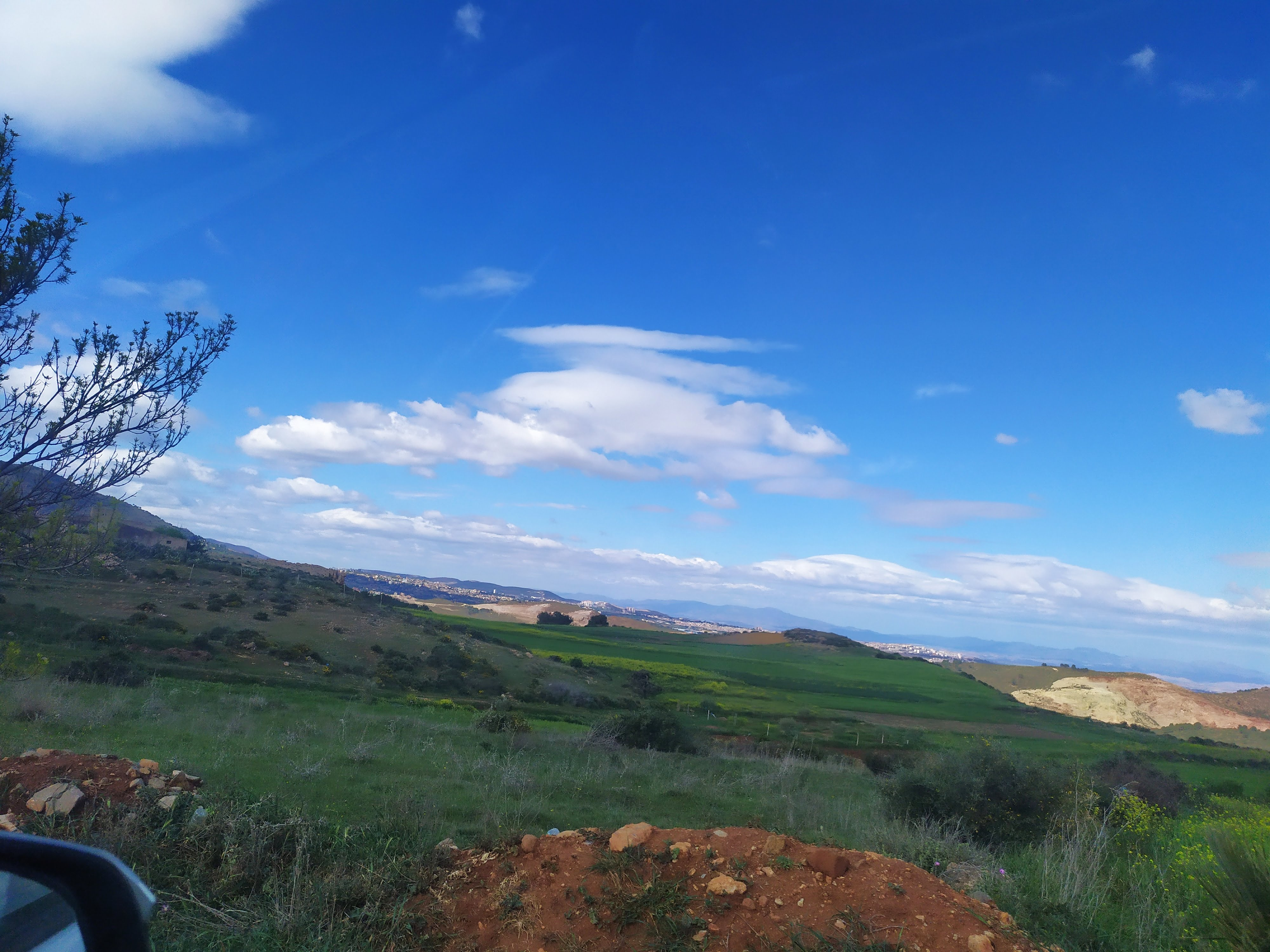

- Location within Algeria
- Country: Algeria
- Province: Tlemcen Province
- Time zone: UTC+1 (CET)

Aïn Fezza is a town and commune in Tlemcen Province in northwestern Algeria.
