= Chetouane =

Coordinates: 34°55′13″N 1°17′23″W

- Commune and town
- Country: Algeria
- Province: Tlemcen Province

Area
  - Total: 41 sq mi (105 km^{2})

Population (2008)
  - Total: 47,600
- Time zone: UTC+1 (CET)

Chetouane is a town and commune in Tlemcen Province in northwestern Algeria.
