= Beni Boussaid =

Coordinates: 34°38′53″N 1°45′11″W

- Commune and town
- Interactive map of Beni Boussaid
- Country: Algeria
- Province: Tlemcen Province
- Time zone: UTC+1 (CET)

Beni Boussaid is a town and commune in Tlemcen Province in northwestern Algeria.
