= Fellaoucene =

Coordinates: 35°02′06″N 1°36′21″W

- Commune and town
- Interactive map of Fellaoucene
- Country: Algeria
- Province: Tlemcen Province
- Time zone: UTC+1 (CET)

Fellaoucene is a town and commune in Tlemcen Province in northwestern Algeria.

== Notable people ==
- Abdelkader Bensalah-politician
