= Trara Mountains =

Mountainous region in the northwest of Algeria

Trara Mountains, Algeria

The Trara Mountains are a mountain range in Algeria, located on the northwest coast of the country. The range has an average altitude of 500 to 1,000 metres (1,600 to 3,300 ft), with a maximum altitude of 1,336 metres (4,383 ft) at the level of the Djebel Fellaoucene.

The Trara Mountains are a coastal range in the western extension of the Tell Atlas mountains. It represents, in the Tell Oranais, a mountainous block that is difficult to access. This massif appears as a mountainous arch between the Mediterranean Sea to the north, the valley of the Wadi Tafna to the east, the Wadi Mouilah to the south and the valley of Wadi Kiss to the west, which determines the Moroccan border. This space represents a well-identified geographical entity considering its rugged relief of east-west orientation running entirely north of the Wilayah of Tlemcen and the northwest of the Wilayah of Aïn Témouchent.

The vegetation of the massif is made up mainly of pines and cypresses.

== Population ==
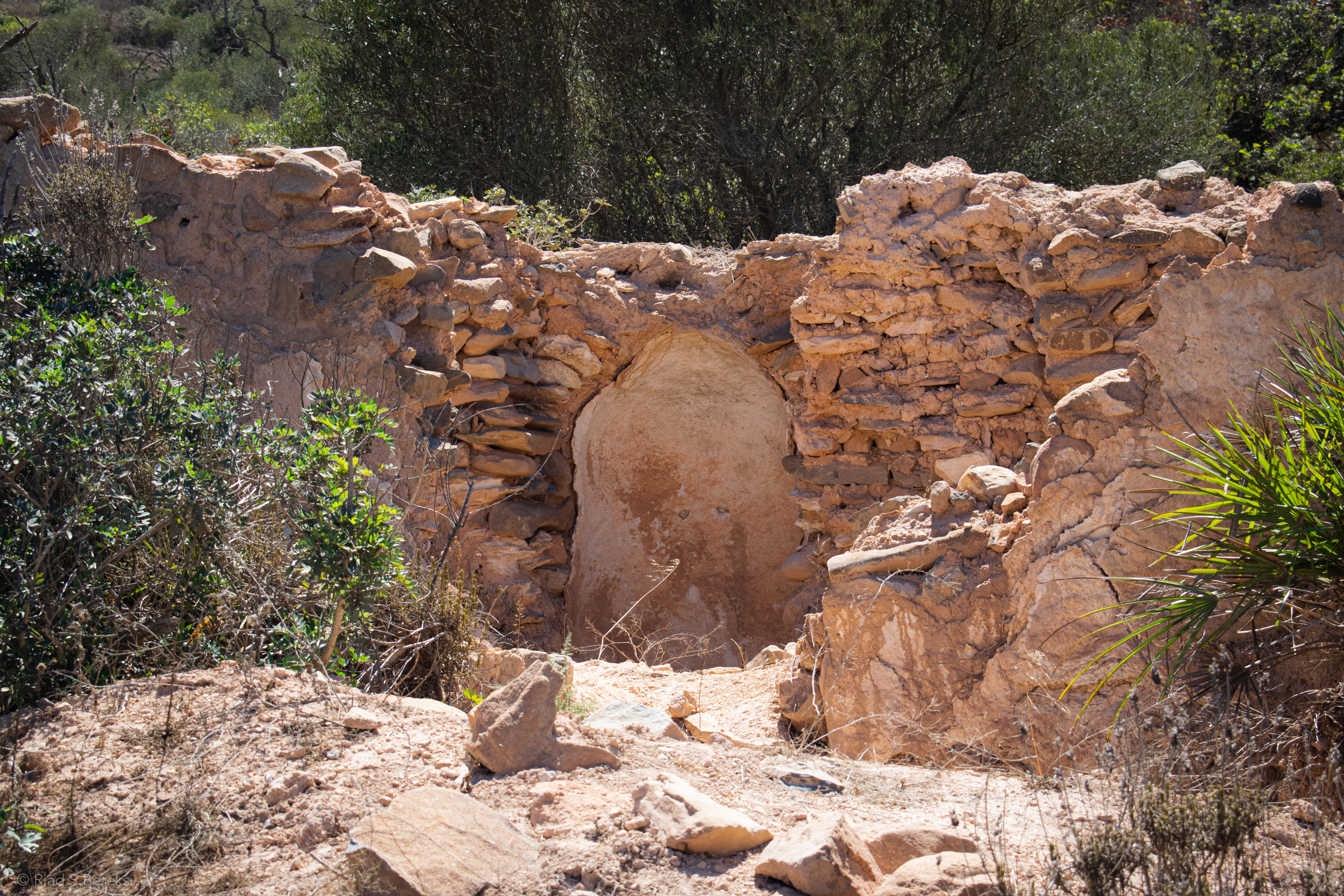
Ruins of the ancient mosque of Mokra, located on Djbel Sidi Sofiane near Tajra in Tlemcen Province

Like other mountainous regions of North Africa, this regional entity is characterized by a human environment of Berber origin, which is very ancient and highly conservative.

The tribes living in this area had been grouped since the Middle Ages into a confederation called Trara, named after the same massif. This confederation was composed of seven tribes of the Koumia branch of the Beni Faten: Beni Mishel, Beni Menir, Beni Ouarsous, Beni Khallad, Beni Abed, Beni Frouzech, and Beni Rimâne. They are also called Oulahca

The Koumia tribe lived in the Trara Mountains, near Nedroma. Remarkable for their bravery, they became one of the most powerful tribes of the Almohads thanks to their exploits.

== Trara and the Almohads ==
Abd Al Mumin Ben Ali, the Almohad caliph, is generally regarded as the “founder of Nedroma” by popular tradition, which has made him the “founding hero” of the city. He was from the Kumia tribe, in the Trara mountains. His place of origin is typically located at the foot of Trara. As noted by Ibn Khaldun, who primarily relied on his native tribe in his government. Many sources reinforce the idea that Abd al-Mu’min descended from Ali ibn Abi Talib, the son-in-law and cousin of Muhammad as well as the father of the Prophet’s only male descendants. This ancestry allowed him to legitimise himself as a direct descendant of the Prophet, an essential criterion for holding the highest office in Islam.

== Notable people ==
Abdul-Mu'min ben Ali (1094-1163) Berber leader and the founder of the Almohad dynasty.
