= Sidi Medjahed =

Coordinates: 34°47′N 1°38′W

- Commune and town
- Interactive map of Sidi Medjahed
- Country: Algeria
- Province: Tlemcen Province
- Time zone: UTC+1 (CET)

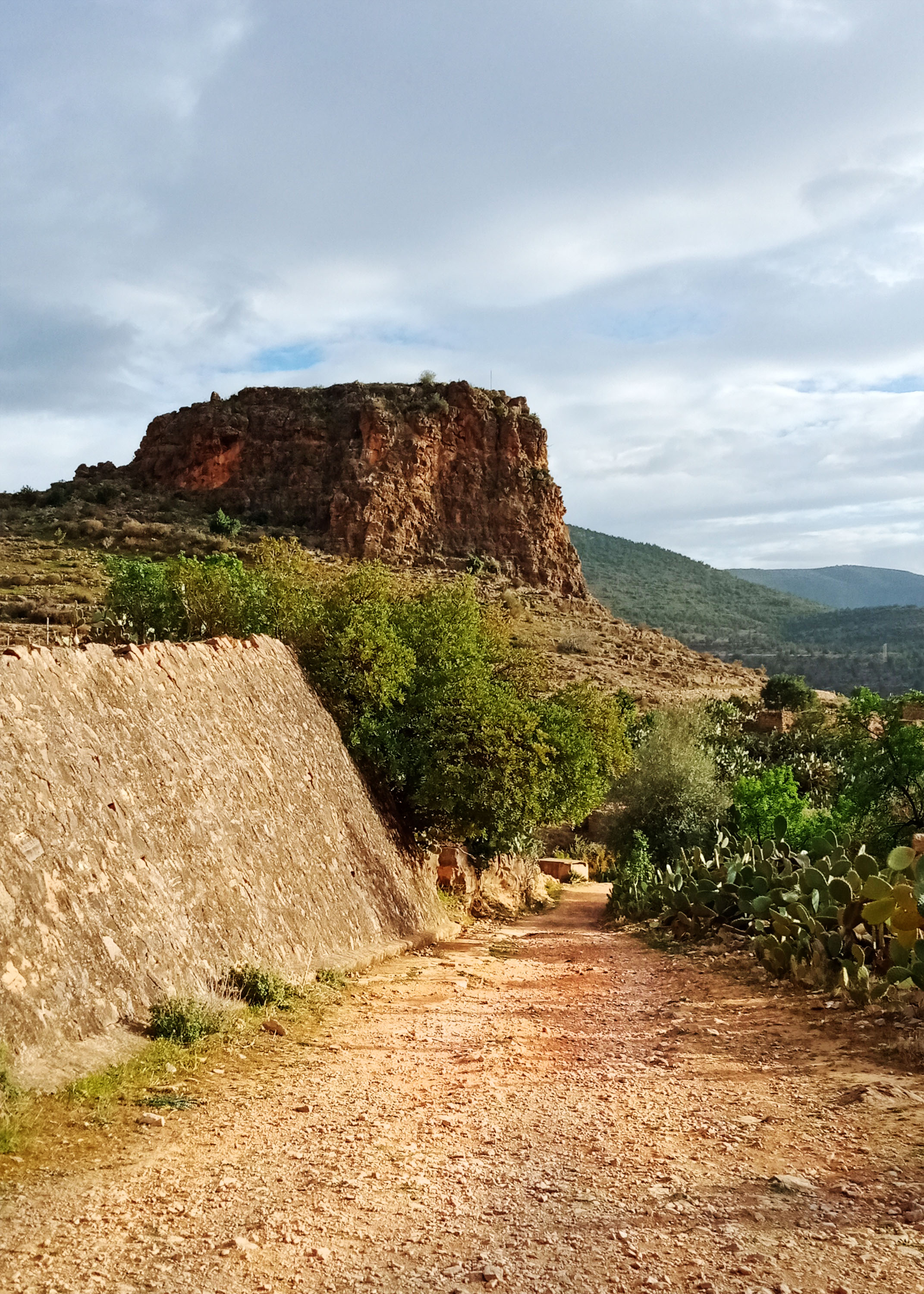

Sidi Medjahed is a town and commune in Tlemcen Province in north-western Algeria.
