= Mountains of Tlemcen =

Mountain range in Algeria

The mountains of Tlemcen are a mountain range of Algeria located in the north-west of the country in the wilaya of Tlemcen.

The Tlemcen Mountains are a chain of the Tellian Atlas situated at its western extremity to the south of the Tlemcen basin. The massif is relatively well watered with precipitation greater than 600 mm / year. It is more forested than the Trara massif, especially in the south-western part. The northern part of the mountains is included in the Tlemcen National Park which overlooks the town of Tlemcen.
