= Aïn Kebira =

Coordinates: 35°01′58″N 1°39′55″W

- Commune and town
- Interactive map of Aïn Kebira
- Country: Algeria
- Province: Tlemcen Province
- Time zone: UTC+1 (CET)

Aïn Kebira is a town and commune in Tlemcen Province in northwestern Algeria.
