= Azails =

Coordinates: 34°40′48″N 1°28′23″W

- Commune and town
- Interactive map of Azails
- Country: Algeria
- Province: Tlemcen Province
- Time zone: UTC+1 (CET)

Azails is a town and commune in Tlemcen Province in northwestern Algeria. It is situated around 27 km southwest from Tlemcen.
