= Maghnia =

Maghnia مغنية
- Commune and town
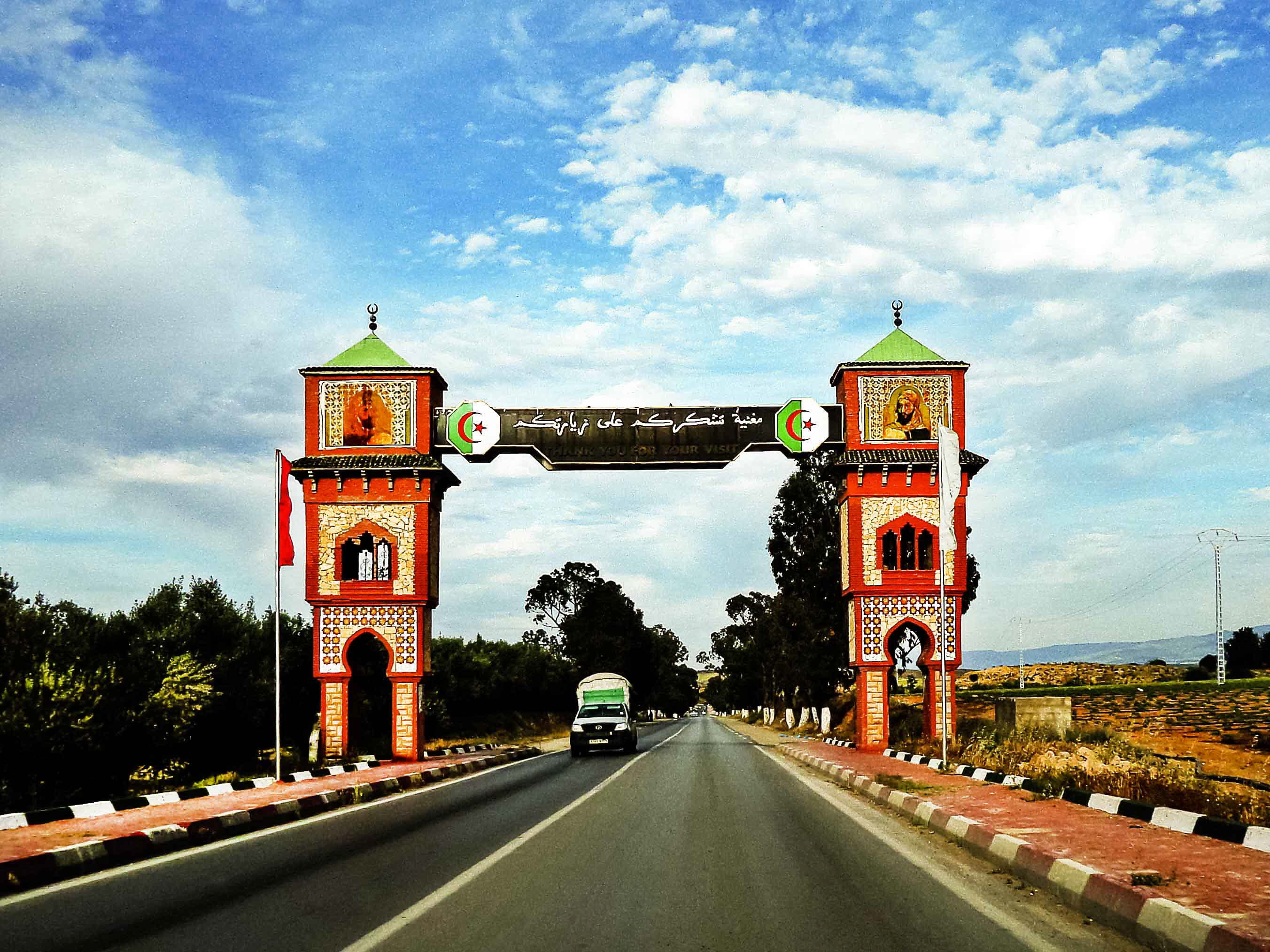
- Riwaq El-Fen in Maghnia
- Motto: courage

- Location within Algeria
- Coordinates: 34°51′42″N 1°43′50″W
- Country: Algeria
- Province: Tlemcen Province
- District: Maghnia District

Area
  - Land: 96 sq mi (249 km^{2})

Population (2008)
  - Total: 114,634
- Time zone: UTC+1 (CET)
- CP: 13001

Maghnia (Arabic: مغنية) (formerly Marnia) is a town in Tlemcen Province, northwestern Algeria. It is the second most populated town in Tlemcen Province, after Tlemcen. The current population is over 100,000.

== History ==
Archaeologists have found evidence of prehistoric people in the area, who were displaced by the Phoenicians. The remnants of burned Ancient Roman military posts called Numerus Syrorum were discovered by the French army in 1836, when they entered the area; these posts were occupied, according to the inscriptions, by the numerus Severianus Alexandrinus Syrorum, a unit of Syrian archers. As such, it was the westernmost outpost of Mauretania Caesariensis.

Due to its convenient geographical location—within the watershed of Wadi Tafna on the route to Fes from Tlemcen, Maghnia later served as a marketplace for regional nomads.

The Berbers named the place Lalla Marnia (Lalla Maghnia), after a local saint buried in the vicinity. Her mausoleum was probably built in the 18th century.

== Notable people ==
- Ahmed Ben Bella, the first President of independent Algeria, was born in Maghnia in 1916.
- Sid Ahmed Ghozali, politician
- Boussouar El Maghnaoui, singer
- Raja Meziane, singer, songwriter, lawyer, and activist
- Emma Vecla (1877–1972), French operatic soprano
