= El Gor =

Coordinates: 34°38′N 1°09′W

- Commune and town
- Interactive map of El Gor
- Country: Algeria
- Province: Tlemcen Province
- Time zone: UTC+1 (CET)

El Gor is a town and commune in Tlemcen Province in northwestern Algeria.
