= El Bouihi =

Coordinates: 34°14′21″N 1°38′04″W

- Commune and town
- Interactive map of El Bouihi
- Country: Algeria
- Province: Tlemcen Province
- Time zone: UTC+1 (CET)

El Bouihi is a town and commune in Tlemcen Province in northwestern Algeria.
