= Sidi Djillali =

Coordinates: 34°28′N 1°35′W

- Commune and town
- Interactive map of Sidi Djillali
- Country: Algeria
- Province: El Aricha Province
- Time zone: UTC+1 (CET)

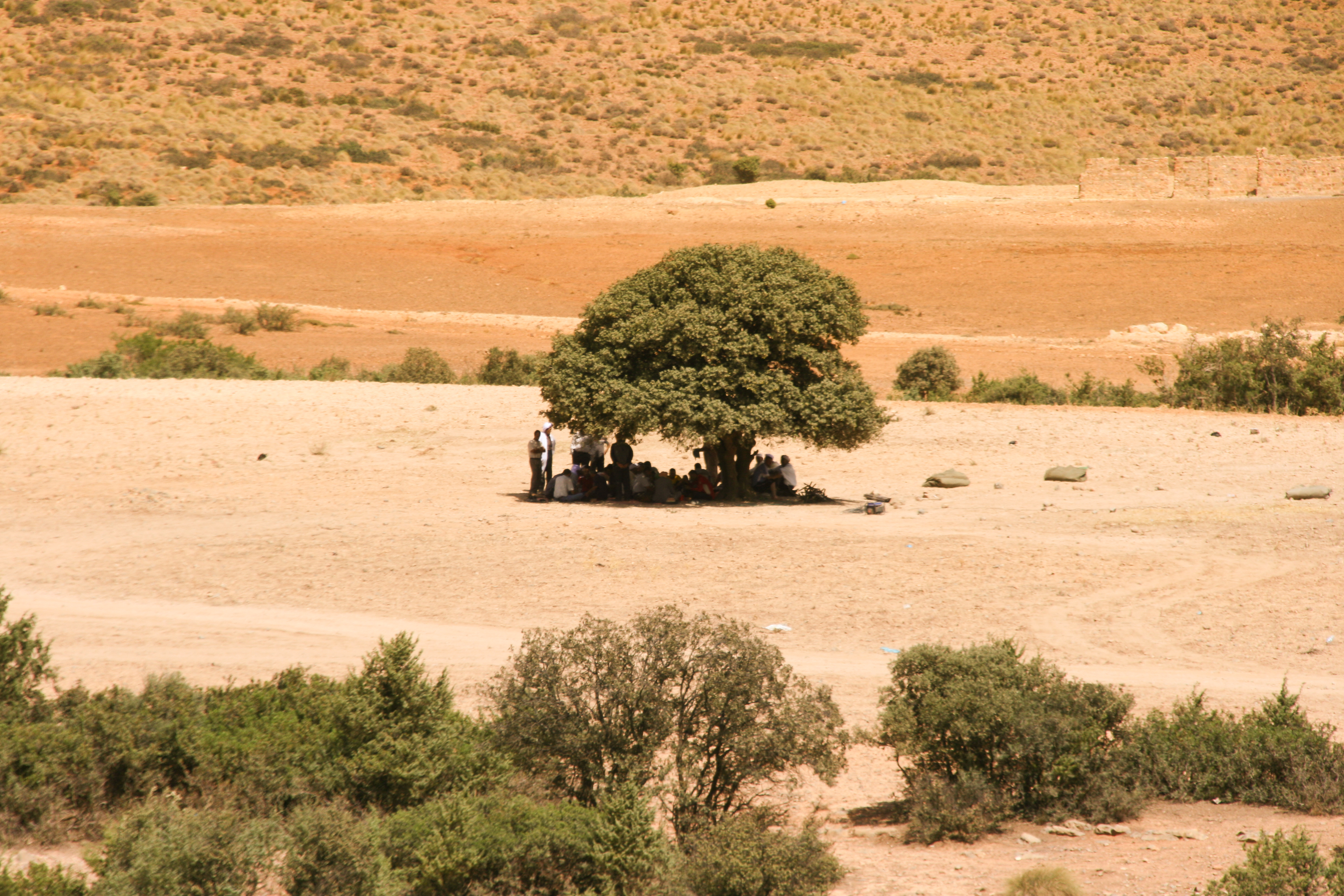

Sidi Djillali is a town and commune in El Aricha Province in north-western Algeria.
