= Galimi =

Galimi is a surname. Notable people with the surname include:

- Félix Galimi (1921–2005), Argentine fencer
- Fulvio Galimi (1927–2016), Argentine fencer

== See also ==
- Halimi
