= Great Mosque of Constantine =

Mosque in Constantine City, Constantine Province, Algeria

- مسجد الجامع الكبير قسنطينة
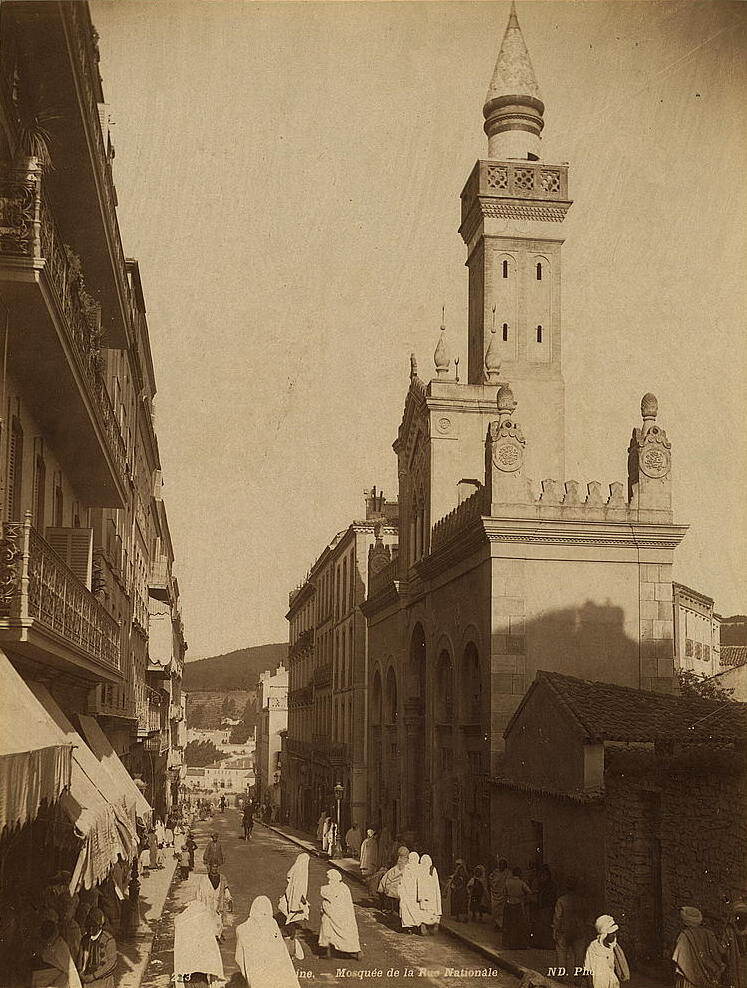
- The mosque in 1860

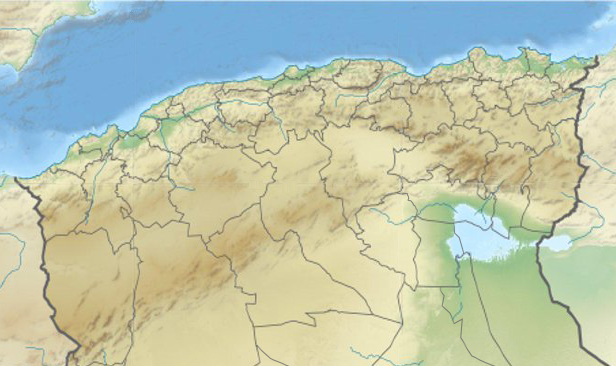
- Location of the mosque in northern Algeria

Religion
- Affiliation: Sunni Islam
- Ecclesiastical or organisational status: Mosque
- Status: Active

Location
- Location: Constantine, Constantine Province
- Country: Algeria
- Interactive map of Great Mosque of Constantine
- Coordinates: 36°21′57″N 6°36′46″E

Architecture
- Type: Islamic architecture
- Style: Islamic
- Completed: 1163 CE

Specifications
- Capacity: 1,500 worshippers
- Dome: 1
- Minaret: 1

The Great Mosque of Constantine (Arabic: مسجد الجامع الكبير قسنطينة, romanized: Djamâa El Kebir; French: Grande Mosquée de Constantine) is a Sunni mosque located in the city of Constantine, in the Constantine Province of Algeria.

== History ==
The Great Mosque of Constantine is located in the city centre of Constantine in Larbi Ben M'hidi Street. The construction of the mosque dates from 1135 CE, during the rule of the Hammadid dynasty. The mosque has undergone many changes, expansions and renovations during its long history, including during the Ottoman era in 1766, and during the French occupation of Algeria.

== Gallery ==
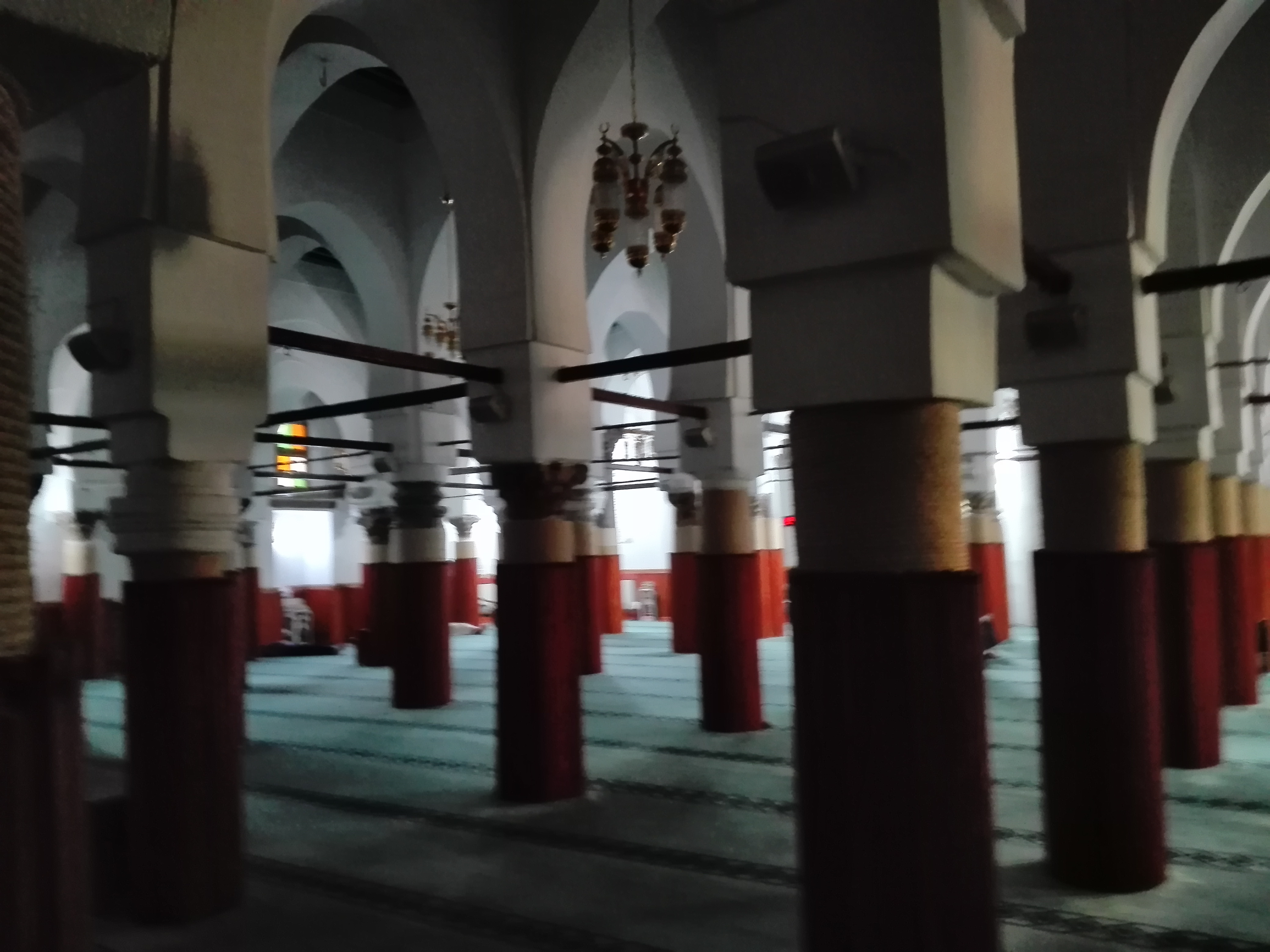
Inside the mosque

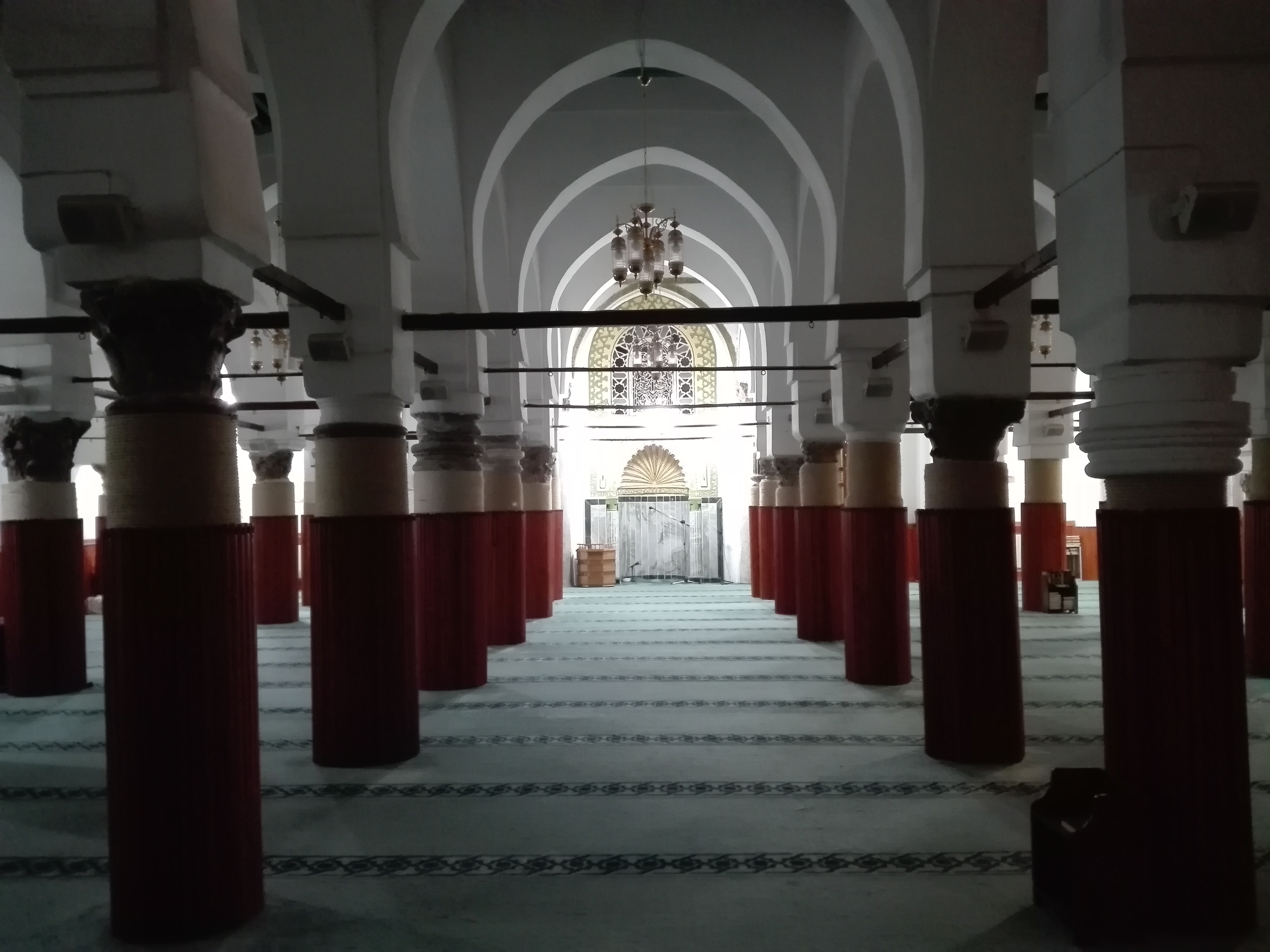
Prayer hall and mihrab

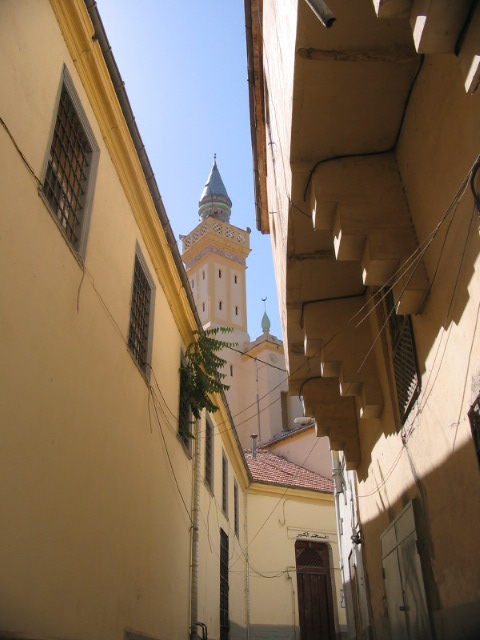
Southern entrance and minaret

== See also ==
- Islam in Algeria
- List of mosques in Algeria
- Ahmed Bey Palace
