= Halimi =

Halimi (Hebrew: חלימי) is a surname. Notable people with the surname include:

- Alphonse Halimi (1932–2006), French boxer
- Besar Halimi (born 1994), Kosovar footballer of Albanian descent
- Eduard Halimi (born 1972), Albanian lawyer and politician
- Gisèle Halimi (1927–2020), French-Tunisian lawyer, activist and writer
- Ilami Halimi (born 1975), Macedonian footballer
- Ilan Halimi (1982–2006), French murder victim
- Lindita Halimi (born 1989), Albanian Kosovar singer, known by the mononym Lindita
- Sarah Halimi (died 2017), French murder victim
- Serge Halimi (born 1955), French journalist
- Sidi Fredj Halimi (1876–1957), Algerian rabbi

== See also ==
- Valérie Grumelin-Halimi (born 1961), French psychologist, psychotherapist and writer
