= Constantine, Algeria =

Constantine Arabic: قسنطينة, romanized: Qusanṭīnah Tamazight: ⵇⵙⵏⵟⵉⵏⴰ, romanized: Qsnṭina
- City
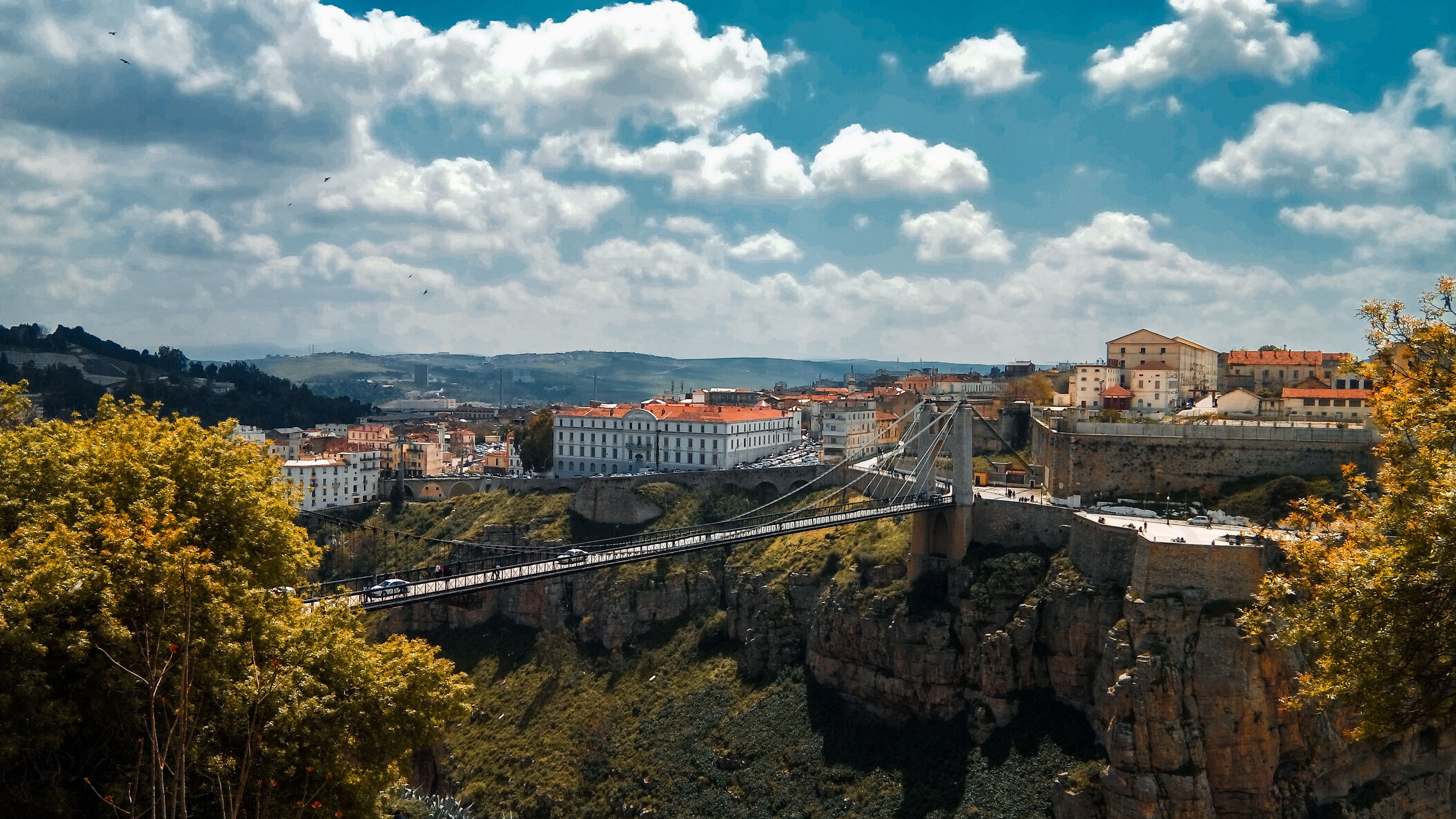
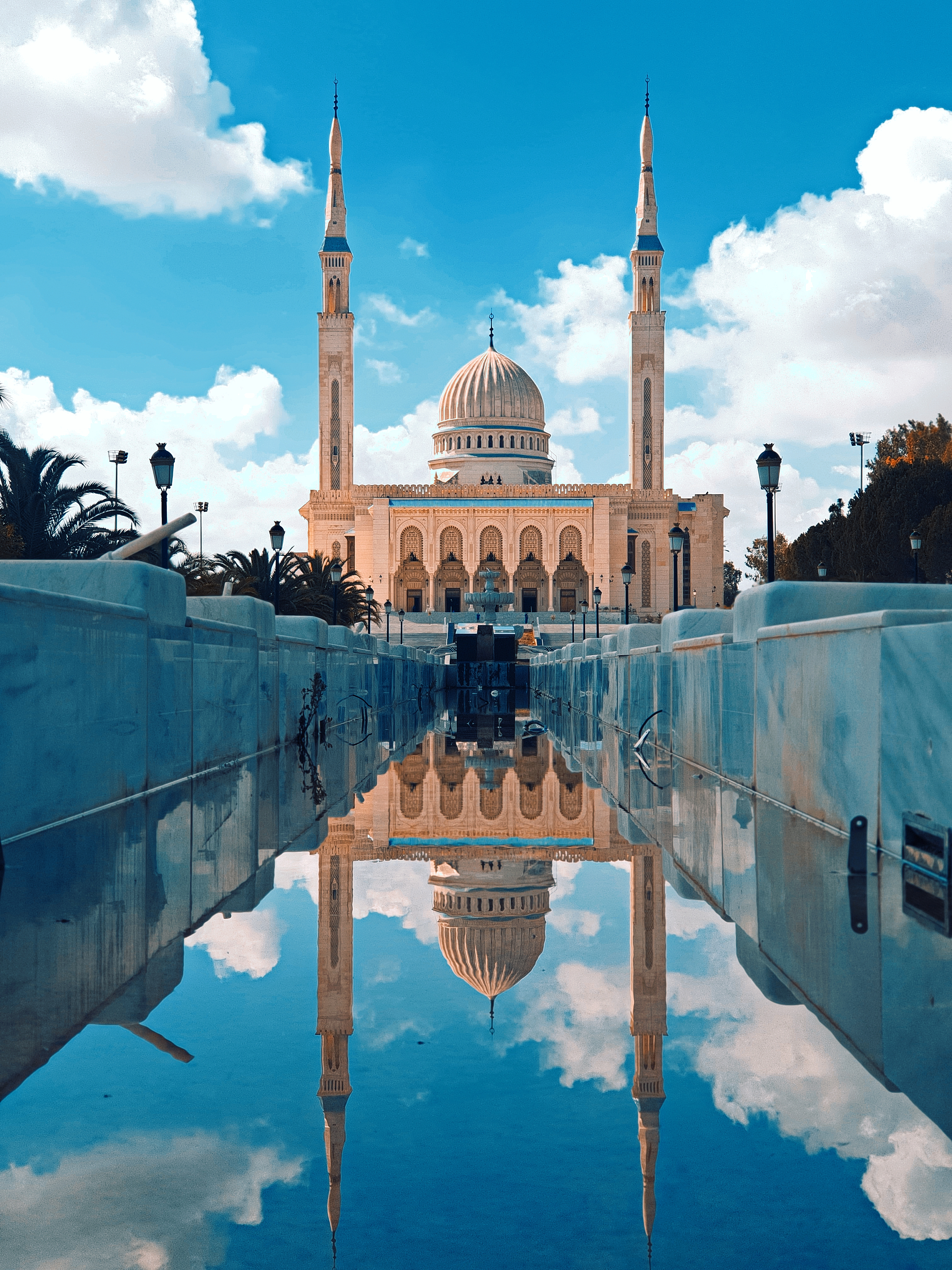
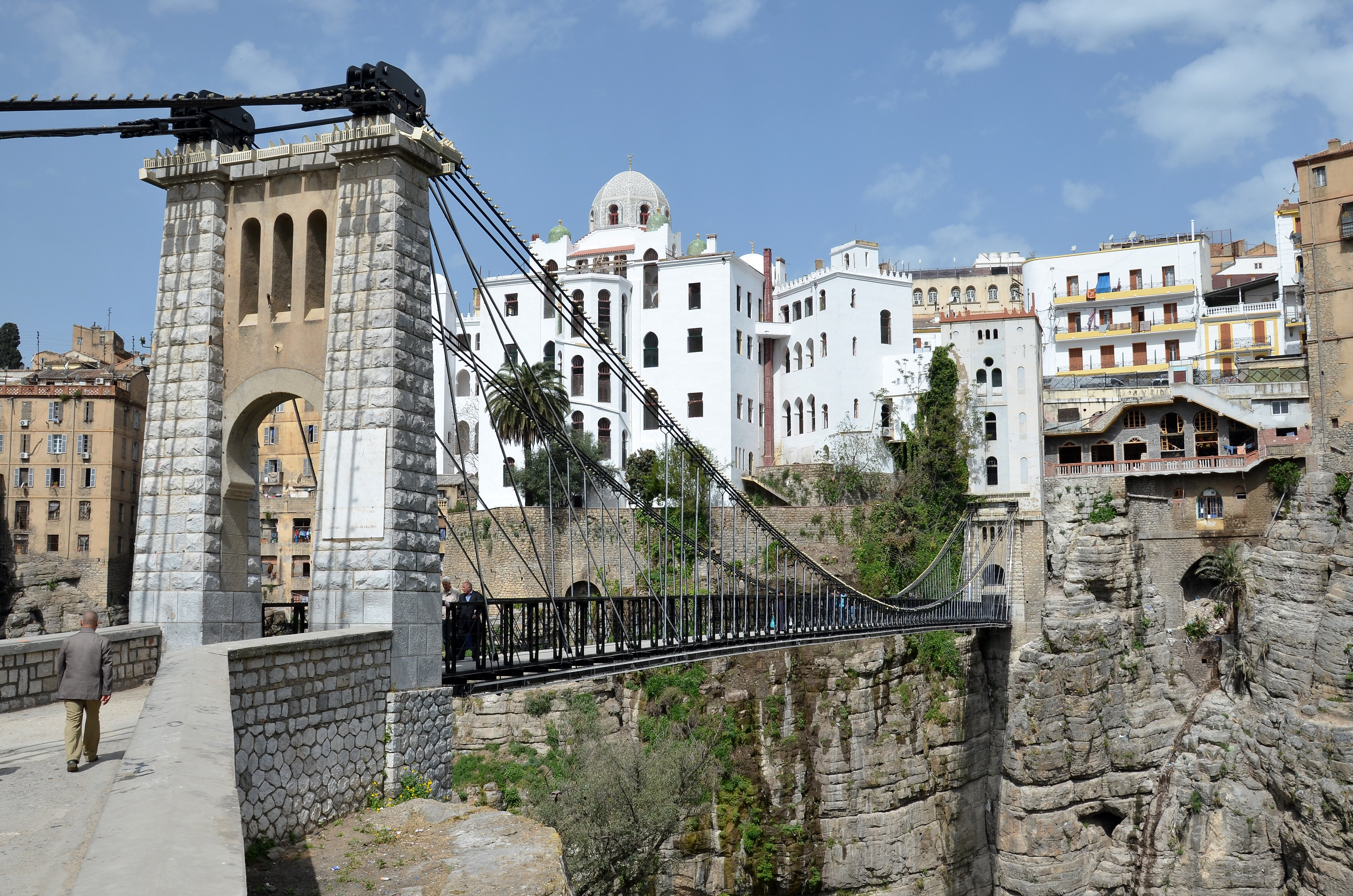
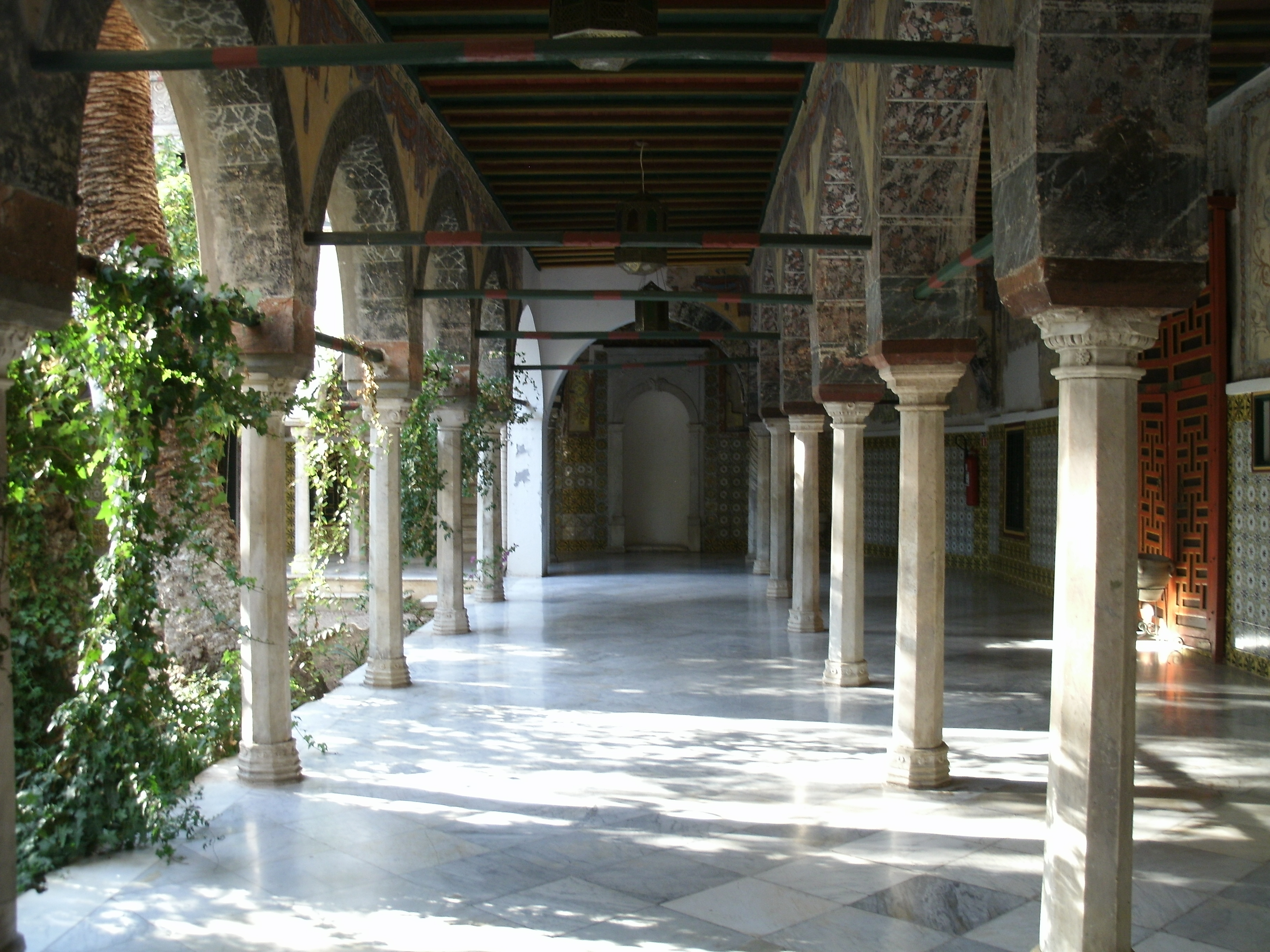
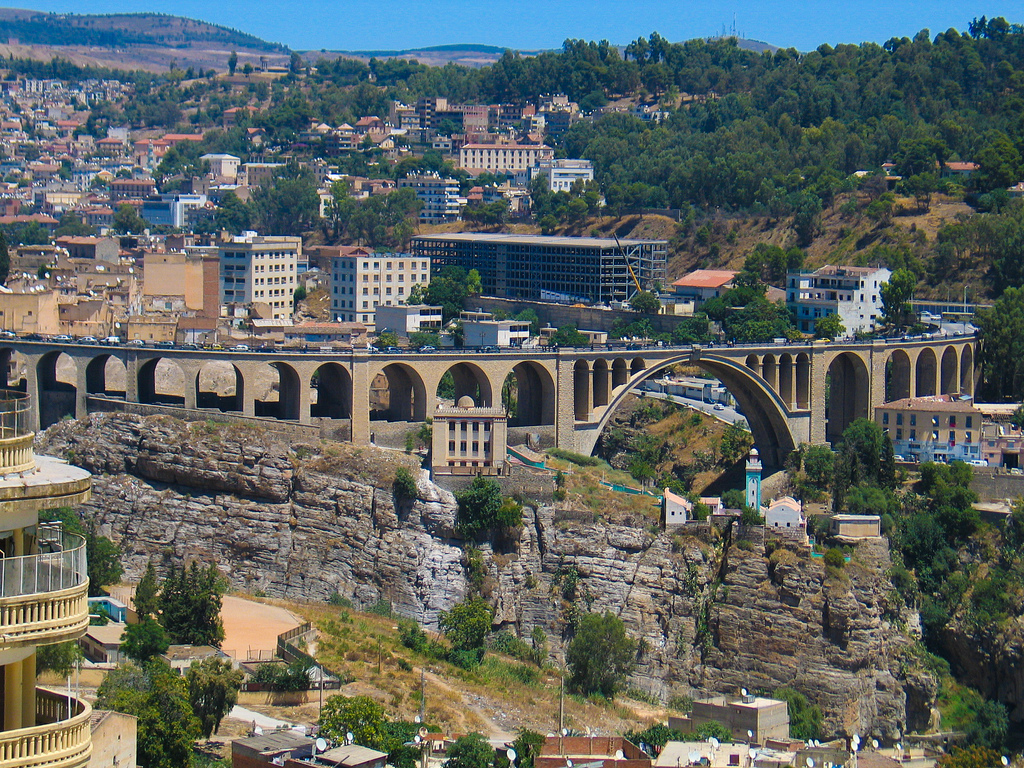
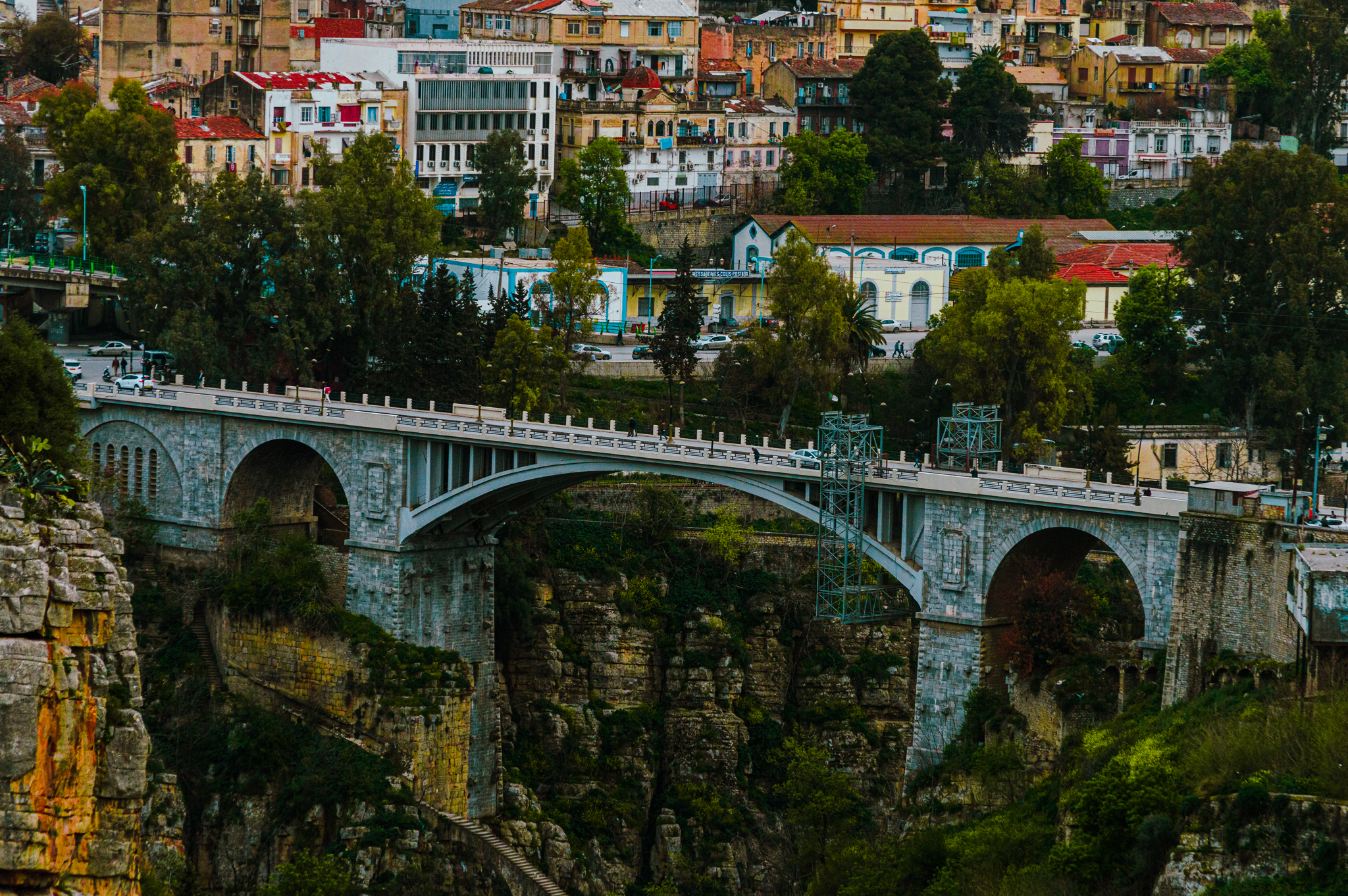
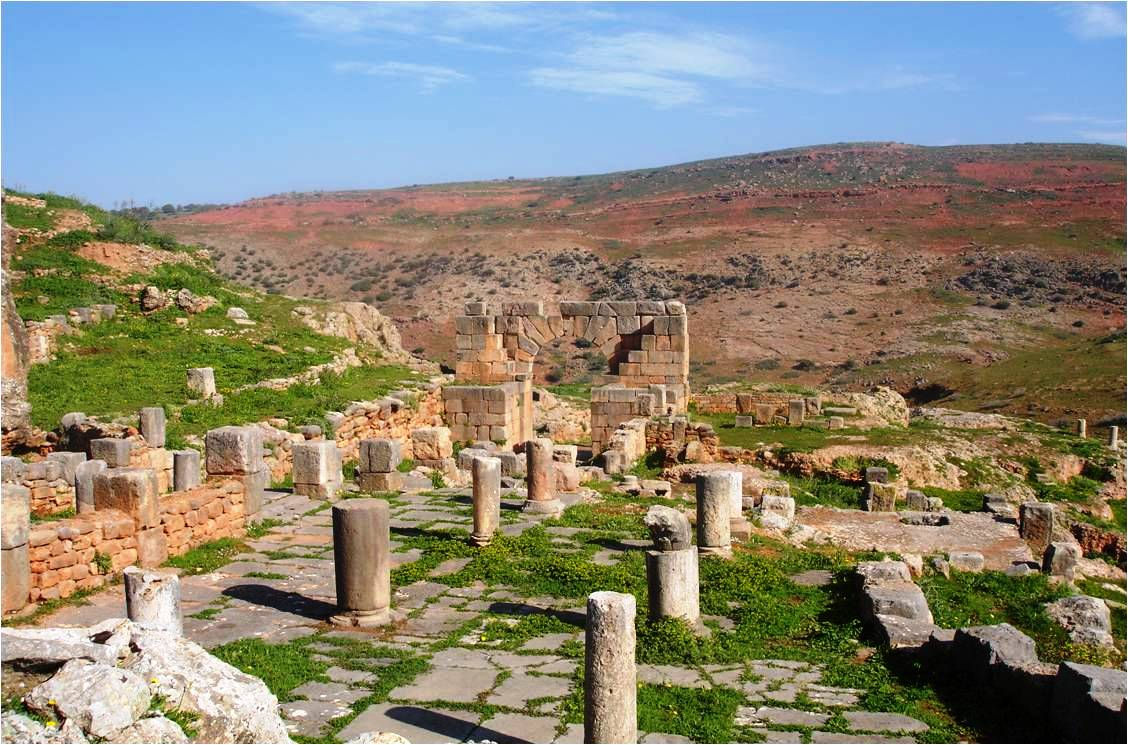
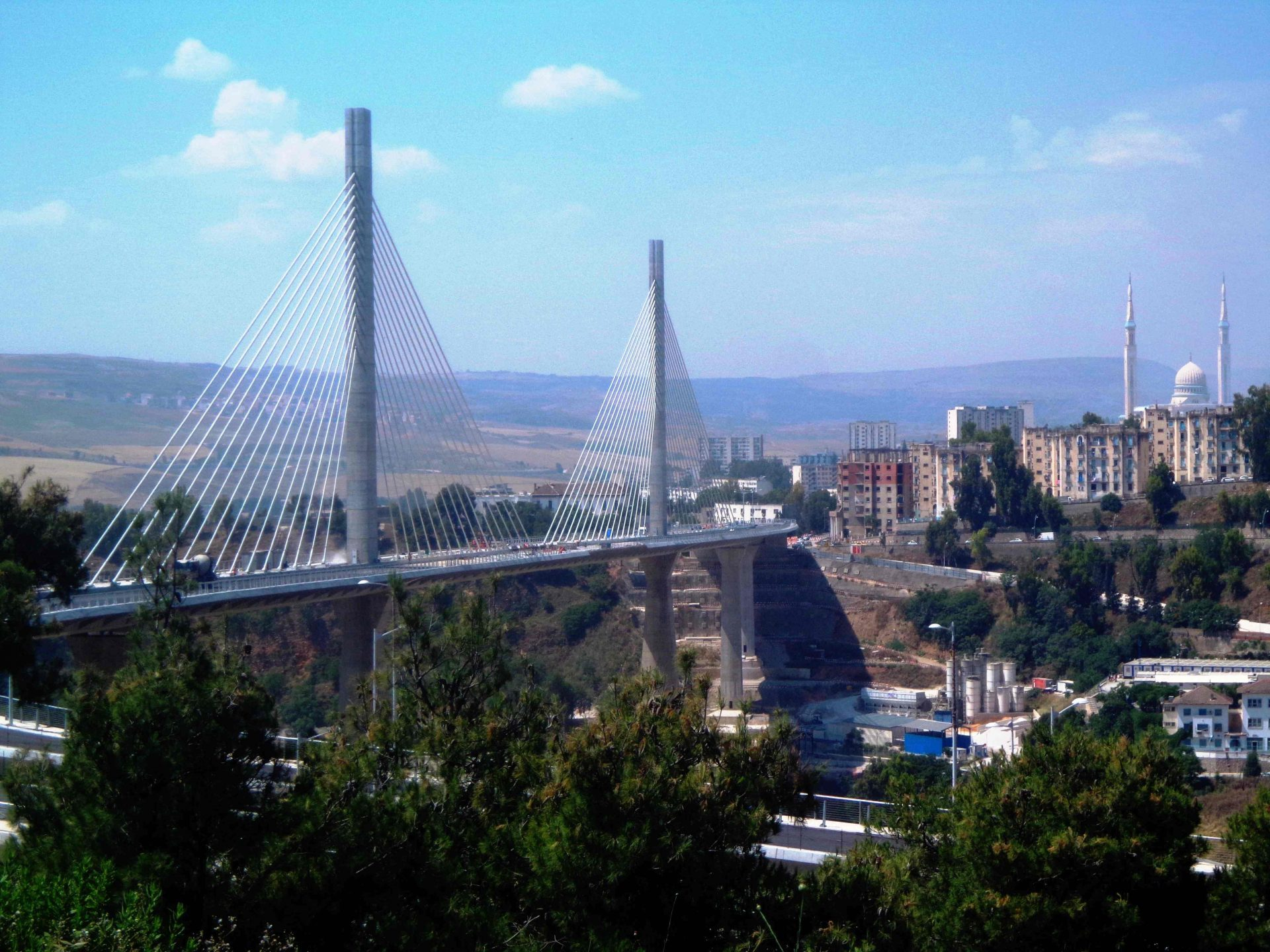
- Sidi M'Cid Bridge Emir Abdelkader Mosque Mellah Slimane Bridge Ahmad Bey Palace Sidi Rached Viaduct Bab El Kantra Bridge Tiddis Salah Bey Viaduct

- Flag Seal
- Nickname: City of Bridges
- Location of Constantine within Constantine Province

- Location within Algeria
- Coordinates: 36°21′N 6°36′E
- Country: Algeria
- Province: Constantine Province
- District: Constantine District
- Cirta: 6th century BC

Government
  - President: Charaf Bensari

Area
  - Total: 2,288 km^{2} (883 sq mi)
- Elevation: 694 m (2,277 ft)

Population (2008 census)
  - Total: 464,219
  - Density: 202.9/km^{2} (525.5/sq mi)
- Demonym: Constantinian
- Time zone: UTC+1 (CET)
- Postal code: 250xx
- Area code: (+213) 031
- Climate: Csa

Historical population
| Year | Pop. | ±% |
|---|---|---|
| 1832 | 25,000 | — |
| 1847 | 20,800 | −16.8% |
| 1911 | 65,193 | +213.4% |
| 1965 | 235,000 | +260.5% |
| 1987 | 440,842 | +87.6% |
Source: Cole

Constantine (Arabic: قسنطينة, romanized: Qusanṭīnah, Tamazight: ⵇⵙⵏⵟⵉⵏⴰ, romanized: Qsnṭina), also spelled Qacentina or Kasantina, is a city and capital of Constantine Province in northeastern Algeria. It is widely regarded as the capital and commercial centre of the country's east. Featuring dozens of bridges, it is dubbed the "City of Bridges." With a population of about 450,000 in the city proper and 938,475 within its agglomeration, it is the third largest city in the country after Algiers and Oran.

Constantine is an important city in the history of the Mediterranean. Formerly called Cirta, it was the capital of Numidia from 300 B.C. to the start of the Roman period. It was then renamed to Constantine in honor of Emperor Constantine the Great. During the Middle Ages, it was conquered by the Arabs in the 7th century and became part of the Aghlabid dynasty, part of the Fatimid Caliphate, then the kingdoms of Zirid, Hammadid, Almohad, and the Zayyanids. In the 16th century, it became the capital of the Beylik of Constantine, a vassal of the Regency of Algiers. It was then taken by the French during the conquest of Algeria in 1837 following a failed attempt in 1836. During and after the Algerian War, the city was integrated by the FLN into Constantine Province as the seat of the wilaya.

Constantine is often referred to as the "City of Bridges" because of the numerous bridges connecting the various hills, valleys, and ravines that the city is built on and around. Other nicknames include the "City of the Old Rock," the "City of Ulama," the "City of Eagles," and "City of Ma'luf." There are several museums and historical sites located around the city, such as the Cirta National Museum for archaeology and art and the Moudjahid Museum of Constantine for Algeria's modern history and independence. Located somewhat inland, Constantine is about 80 kilometres (50 miles) from the Mediterranean coast, on the banks of the Rhumel River.

In 2015, Constantine was named the "Arab Capital of Culture" by the Arab League Educational, Cultural and Scientific Organization (ALESCO).

== Etymology ==
The ancient name for the city, Cirta, has no certain origin. Some believe it comes from the Semitic root QRTN, pronounced /ˈqir.ta/ (قرة), which originally meant "city" or "village" in Phoenician. Its pronunciation has since drifted to Sirta during the Roman period. Another hypothesis suggests that the name comes from the Berber word "tissirt," meaning wheat flour, given the abundance of wheat cultivation in the surrounding region. Arthur Pellegrin, a French writer, historian, and journalist, proposes another etymology; the word could derive from Karath, which means "cut," "separate," or "incise." This could be logical given the geographical location of the city.

The city's modern name comes from the Roman emperor Constantine I, who restored and embellished it in 313 after it was besieged and sacked by Maxentius and Domitus Alexander in 311. It then became the capital city of the Numidia Province.

The official Algerian name for the city today is Qacentina, or Ksentina in Algerian Arabic. The toponym Qusantina, and its variant Qusantina al-Hawa, are frequently mentioned throughout medieval Arabic texts. However, some Arab authors tended to confuse them with al-Qustantinia (Constantinople)

== History ==
=== Prehistory ===
The region surrounding modern Constantine has been occupied by humans since Prehistoric times. Tools used by humans at the time have been found in the modern commune Ouled Rahmoun, south of the city. Aterians have been present in the caves of Djebel el Wahch, a forested mountain area near Constantine. The Iberomaurusian and Capsian cultures have left some traces of Neolithic presence in the area, and the Libyco-Berbers lived in the same places during the 1st millennium BC, building megalithic monuments, bazinas, and mounds.

=== Ancient history ===
Constantine was founded sometime in the 6th century BC. It was first mentioned as Cirta during the end of the 3rd century BC as the seat of king Syphax, king of Massylli. As a fortified commercial centre, it benefitted from a strategic position along its many cliffs and valleys. During the later reigns of Massinissa and his successors, particularly that of his son Micipsa, the city expanded. From the end of the 3rd century BC to the beginning of the 2nd century BC, the city expanded southwest towards the Rummel River, where numerous remains such as inscriptions, tombs, and objects have been found within the rocks.

The city began to produce and export cereals, attaining monetary autonomy by the end of the 2nd century BC. According to Appian, Cirta could have housed up to 10,000 cavalrymen and 20,000 infantrymen. Stéphane Gsell estimated the city's population to have been between 150,000 and 180,000.

Cirta was eventually integrated as the capital of Numidia following the Second Punic War. It became a cosmopolitan city open to several other Mediterranean civilizations—in particular the Punics and Greeks—and coexisted with the nomadic lifestyles of the Gaetuli. Many of the societies within Cirta followed the religions of Baal Hamon and Tanit, the Carthaginian goddess of fertility. The El Hofra shrine testifies to the importance of Punic culture in society. In 112 BC, following the death of Massinissa, the city became the seat of the Numidian king Jugurtha, who defeated his half-brother Adherbal. The city later served as the base for Roman generals Quintus Caecilius Metellus Numidicus and Gaius Marius in their war against Jugurtha. Later, with the removal of King Juba I and the remaining supporters of Pompey in Africa (c. 46), Julius Caesar gave special rights to the citizens of Cirta, now known as Colonia Sittlanorum.

In 311 AD, the city was destroyed during a war between the Roman emperor Maxentius and usurper Domitius Alexander (a former governor of Africa). It was rebuilt in 313 AD and renamed "Colonia Constantiniana," or simply "Constantina," after Roman emperor Constantine the Great.

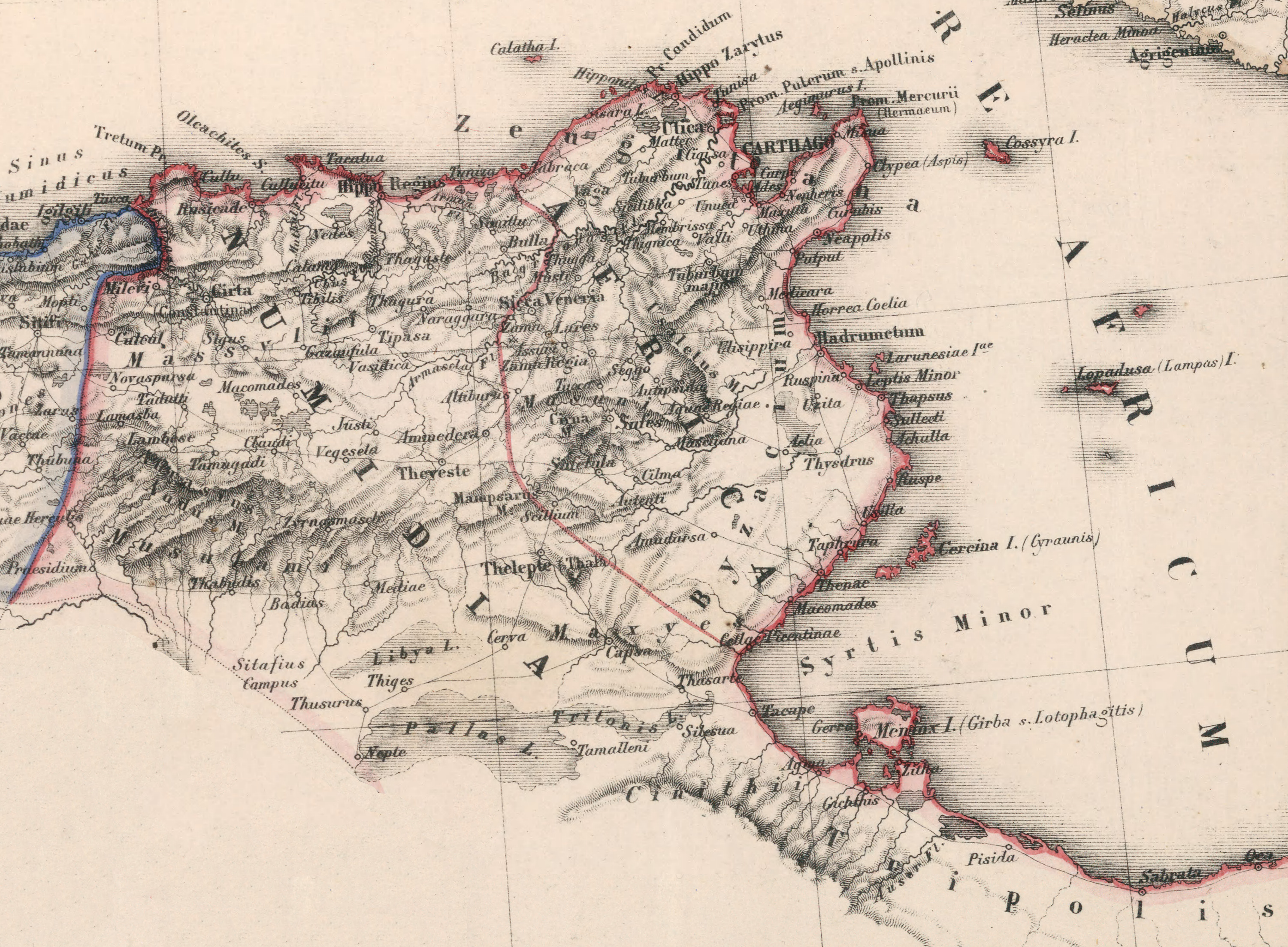
Map of Roman Numidia (pink)

During Roman rule, the city exported wheat and was the only population center that lay on both of the Roman roads paved in ancient Algeria. Constantine was captured by the Vandals in 432, and returned to the Byzantine Exarchate of Africa in 534. Following the Arab conquest of the city in the 8th century, it became known as Qacentina. The city was a part of the wider region of Ifriqiya.

=== Islamic Era ===
On an unknown date, the city of Constantine came under Arab-Muslim rule, although chroniclers at the time were mostly silent about this period. However, it is plausible that it was not affected much by the conquest of the Maghreb and that it was conquered only at the end of the 7th century, around the same time the last strongholds of the Byzantines fell.

According to several descriptions in medieval Arabic texts, Constantine was the economic centre of a fertile and well-irrigated region. Its countryside produced abundant livestock and crops, which provided a variety of essential products in daily life such as wheat, barley, honey, butter, and fruits. Also, the city was home to many well-stocked markets. Its strategic location along important roads gave it a significant commercial role, as confirmed by the references of Muhammad al-Idrisi.

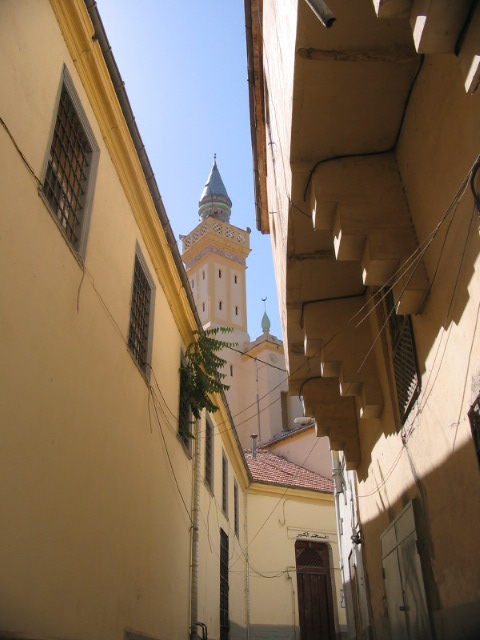
Great Mosque of Constantine, built by the Hammadids in 1135

The integration of the city into Arab civilization was clearly established with the arrival of the Aghlabids. At the beginning of the 10th century, a revolt led by the Berber Kutama led to the fall of Aghlabid power and established Shia Islam under the protection of the Fatimid Caliphate. Subsequently, power passed from the Fatimids onto the Zirids, and Constantine played a crucial role as a vital crossroad in trade and roads. Likewise, under the Hammadids, it took on as a major city while maintaining commercial transactions with the Arabs. After the migrations of the Banu Hilal, the capital of the Hammadids was transferred to Bejaia, but Constantine nonetheless grew in activity.

Following the capture of Bejaia by the Almohads, Yahya ibn Abd al-Aziz, the final king of the Hammadids, sought refuge in Consantine before going to Abd al-Mu'min. The city faced several moments of vulnerability, such as the potential attack of the Banu Ghaniya in 1185, however it was largely preserved from these threats. Finally, after the fall of the Almohads, it came under the authority of the Hafsids, who had proclaimed their independence from Tunis in 1230. From the 13th century to the 16th century, the history of Constantine under the Hafsid dynasty is marked by complexity and instability. It is characterized by a constant switch of subjugation from the power of Tunis to periods of independence. The rulers of Tunis had large attachments to their possession of the city, yet continuously lost control of it.

From 1282 to 1309, local governors frequently rebelled against Tunis. In 1282, during the reign of Abu Ishac, Governor Ibn al-Wazir revolted against Tunis, forcing his son Abu Faris to retake the city by force. King Abi l-Bakaʾ would briefly restore the unify of the Hafsids in 1309 and temporarily restore stability in the Eastern Maghreb. Under vizier Ibn Ghamr, Constantine was practically independent between 1312 and 1319, and succeeded in installing a prince of his own choice, Abu Yahya, on the throne of Tunis. However, in 1325, the revolt of Ibn al-Kalun, another vizier, exposed the population of Constantine to an attack led by the Zayyanids. A war then broke out between the Marinids and the Zayyanids in the west, offering Constantine a few years of respite.

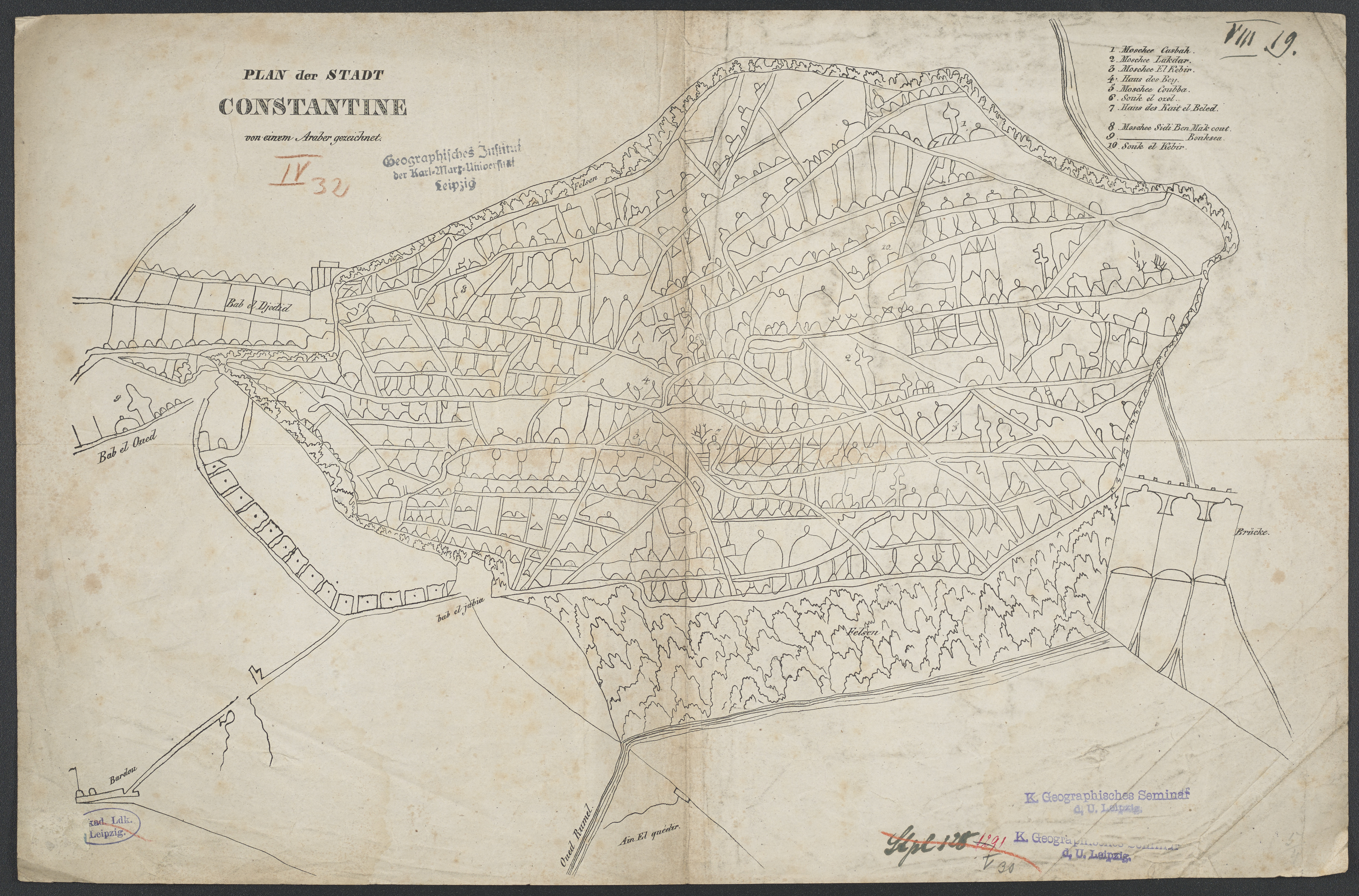
Map of the city at the end of the Ottoman period

However, order was again disrupted in the mid-14th century by Marinid expeditions. Abu al-Hasan Ali ibn Uthman, sultan of the Marinids, captured Constantine and replaced the authority of the Hafsids. Former Hafsid governor Abu Zayd, relased by Abu Inan Faris, regained control of Constantine and proclaimed Abu al-Hasan Ali ibn Uthman's son, Tashfin, as sultan. Shortly after, his brother Abu al-Abbas overthrew him and dethroned Tashfin, making himself sultan. After repelling the Dhouaouda and the Sadwikish who besieged Constantine in 1355, Abbas maintained tranquility in the city and the surrounding region until his death. His successor, Abu Faris, had to reconquer the city twice from his brother Abu Bakr, who had taken it with the support of Arab tribes.

By the 15th century, Hafsid rule had become symbolic more than real. The Awlad Sawla, a fraction of the Arab tribe of Dhouaouda, had become the true leaders of the city. Power was exercised by a few families who were clients of the Awlad Sawla. Among them was the Abd al-Mumin family, whose members held the fucntions of qadi and lefgun.

=== Ottoman Empire ===
From the 16th century, the city of Constantine came under the control of the Ottoman Empire in 1535, integrated as the seat of the Beylik of Constantine, the most important of the three beyliks of the Regency of Algiers. It was the most populated, largest, and richest city in Algeria, yet was only medium-sized in comparison with other cities in the Arab world at the time. It was one of the only inland cities in the Regency which continued to enjoy certain prosperities. Merchants traded a variety of goods such as agricultural products, animals, embroidered textiles, leather, precious metals, swords, and pistols.

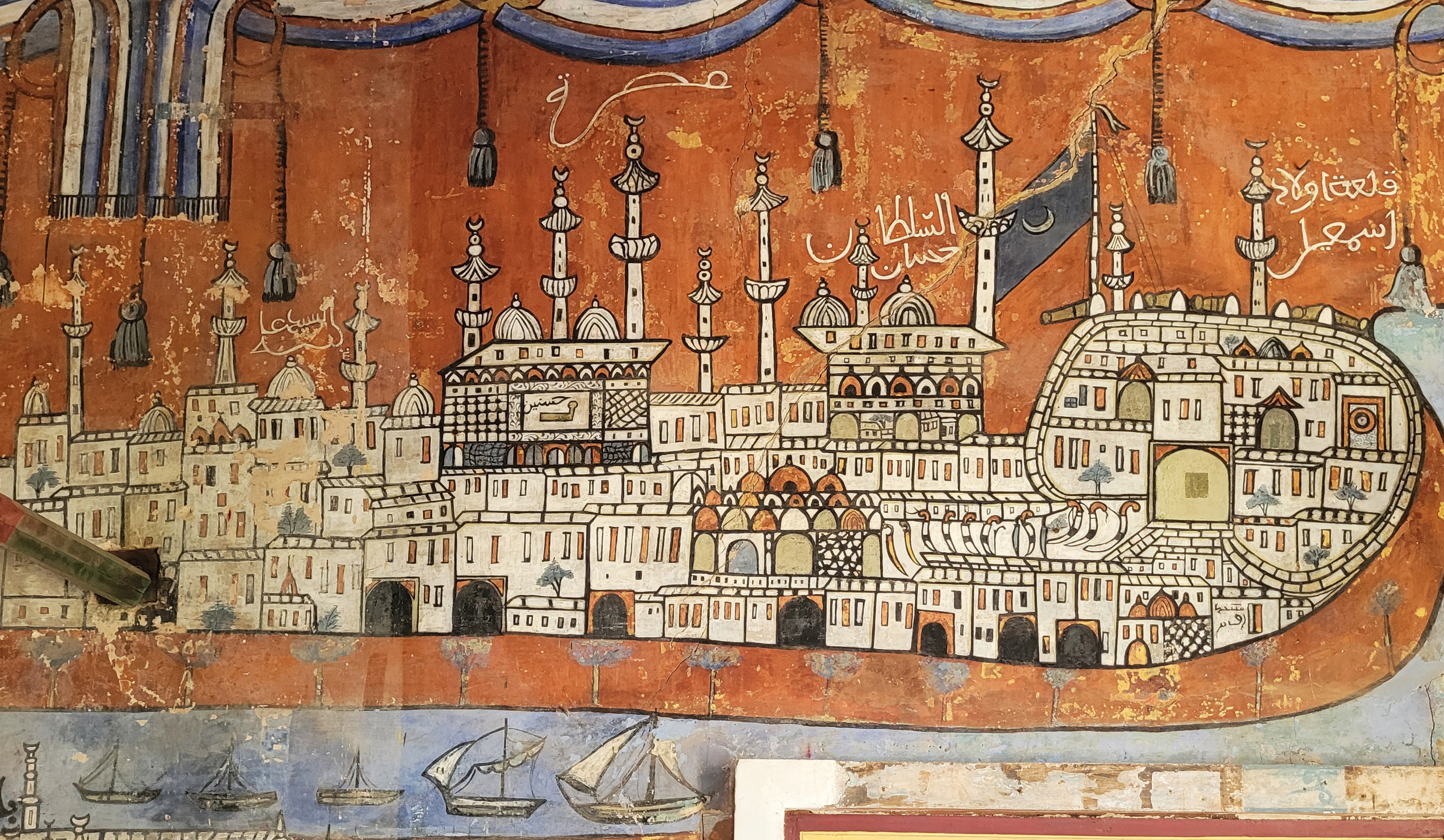
Fresco in the Ahmed Bey Palace

Certain notable city-dwellers actively participated in the management of city affairs. The bey of Constantine was designated by the dey of Algiers, but just as in Algiers, the literate elites found a place in the management functions of education, worship, justice, and habous. Several beys were kouloughlis, or mixed Ottoman-North African people. Turkish played as asmall role in the city's society as the number of Turks living in Constantine remained very small: only 300 men were permanently stationed there as a garrison and no Turkish inscriptions have been discovered in the city.

The city was divided into four main districts located at each corner: Tabiya to the southwest, Qasba to the northwest, Qantara to the northeast, and Bab al-Jabiya to the southeast. The main gates were all on the south side: Bab al-Jadid (new gate), Bab al-Wad (gate of the river), and Bab al-Jabiya (gate of the cistern) served as the lower entrances of the city. The city held many mosques and zawiyas. It had around 41 trade corporations, each managed by amîn against 57 in Algiers. The suburbs to the south were inhabited by several artists, workers, and many Kabyles. The notable city-dwellers were mainly large landowners of grain farms surrounding the city.

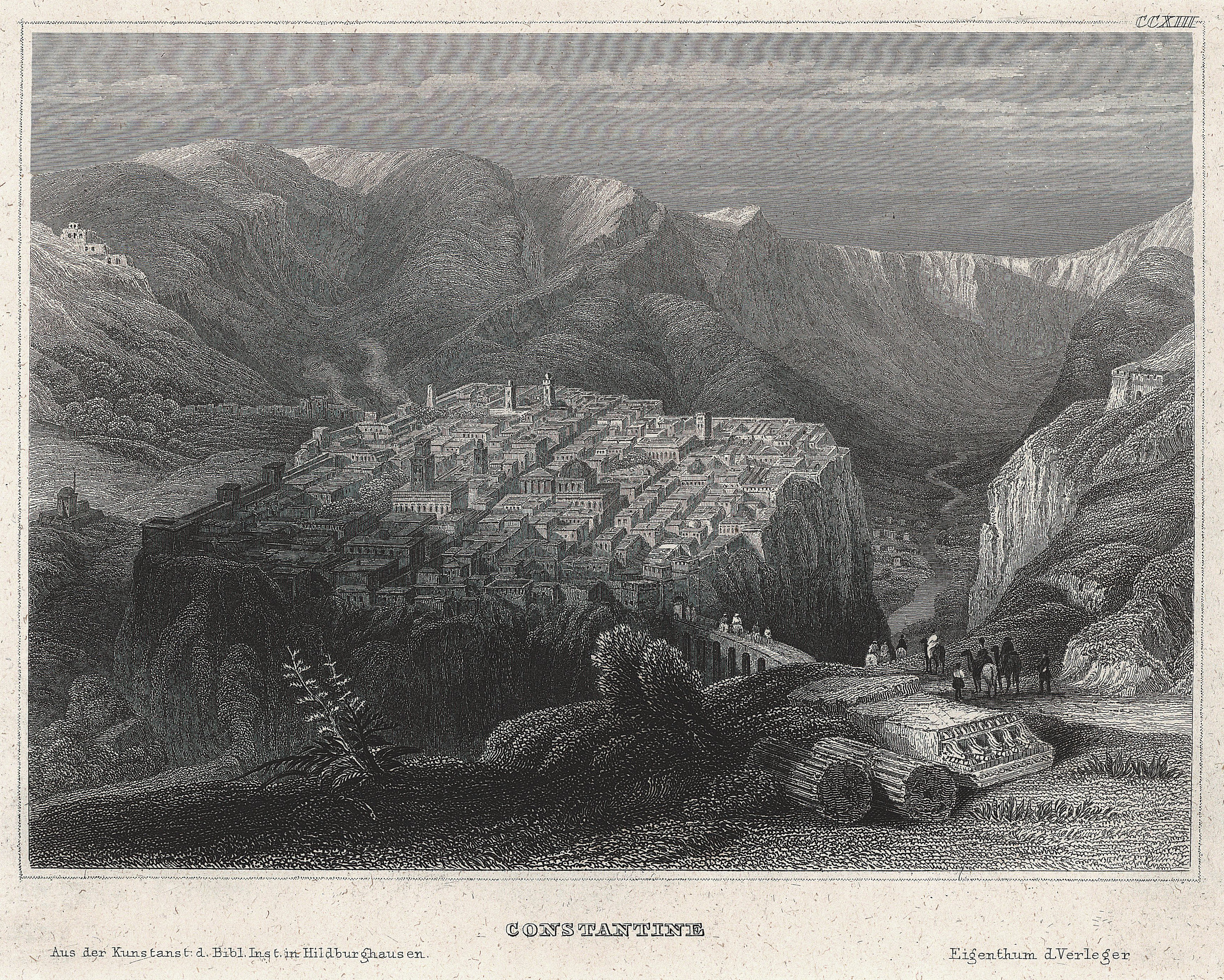
Constantine at the beginning of the 18th century

Between the 16th century and the 17th century, while the city remained slightly autonomous, it faced strong internal unrest and Turkish pressure. The approach of the Ottomans had revealed and established the existence of two rival parties which shared the city: the family of Abdal-Muman and the family of Lefgun. A century of conflict had led to the collapse of the Abdal-Muman and the affirmation of their rival.

Under the government of Bey Farhat, Constantine experienced a period of stability which lasted for around half a century. However, Algerian interference in Tunisian internal affairs exposed Constantine to reprisals from their neighbors. In 1700, the bey of Tunis, Mourad, won two decisive victories against the bey of Constantine, Ali Khodja, which pushed him to besiege the city for three months. Faced with this situation, the bey of Algiers dispatched an army to rescure the population of Constantine and thus made it possible to lift the siege.

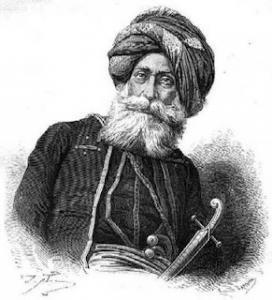
Portrait of Salah Bey ben Mostefa

Constantine again enjoyed a period of stability and significant urban growth in the 18th century under the governor Salah Bey ben Mostefa from 1770 to 1792. He is regarded as one of the greatest governors of Constantine as greatly embellished the city and built much of the Islamic architecture still visible today.

Following the reign of Salah Bey, a period of anarchy and disorder occurred. Between 1792 and 1826, no less than 17 beys succeeded each another at the head of the government of Constantine. In 1807, the inhabitants of Constantine joined a resistance of the city, besieged by the Tunisians; in 1808, they refused to support Ahmad Chaouch's revolt and remained loyal to the authorities in Algiers.

In 1826, the last bey, Ahmed Bey ben Mohamed Chérif, became the new head of state. After the capture of Algiers, he led a fierce resistance against French forces, which invaded Algeria four years after his rule began. By October of 1837, the territory was captured by France. The people of Constantine invested Ahmed with power and reaffirmed their loyalty to the bey in several petitions, maintaining his rule until the invasions of 1836 and 1837, during which they actively participated in the resistance under the leadership of the city's nobles. From 1848 until 1962, it was the capital of the Constantine Department.

=== French Algeria ===
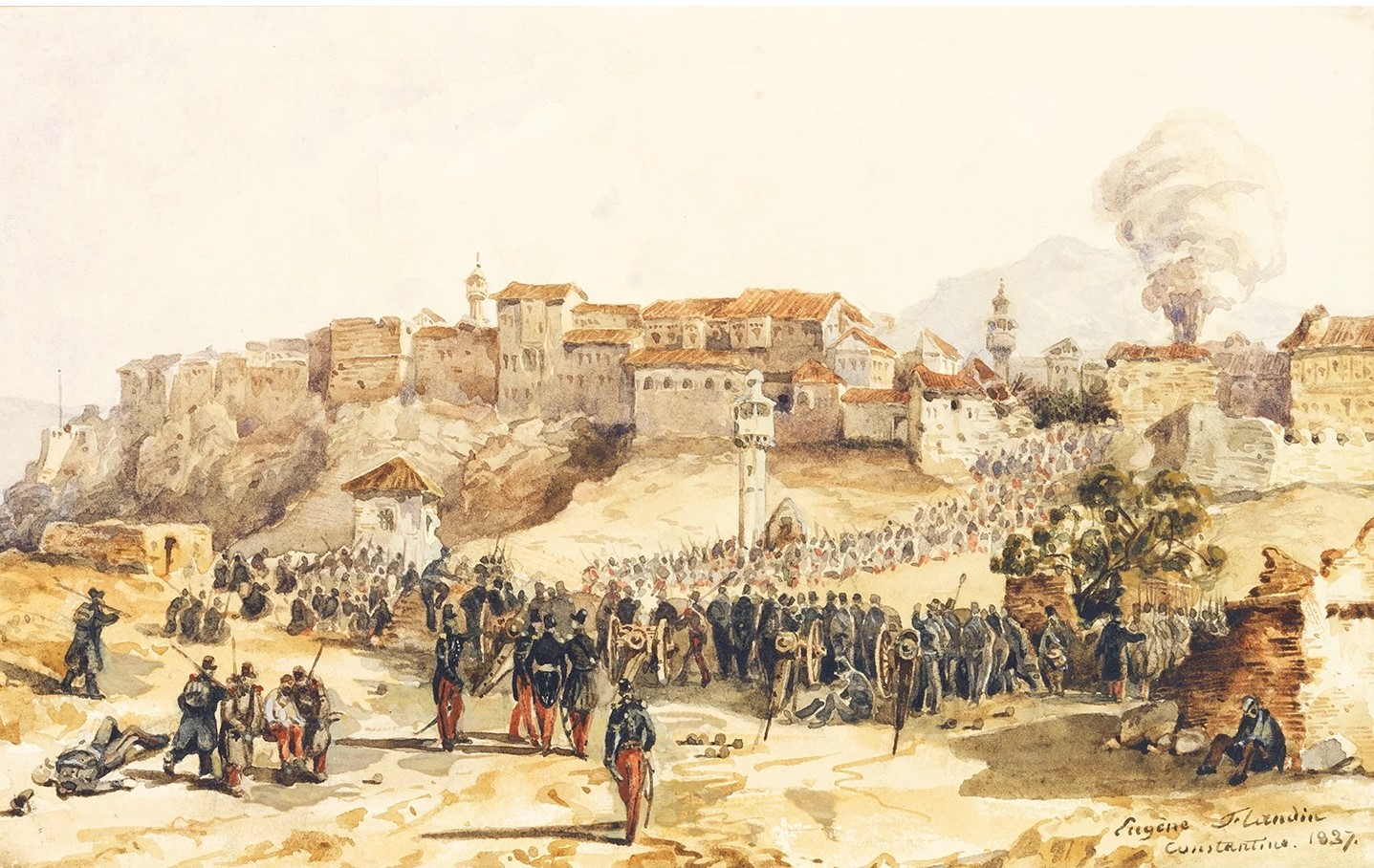
The Siege of Constantine in 1837

In 1836, Marshal Clauzel, the governor of Algeria at the time, led an invasion against Constantine. About 7,000 men arrived on the 21st of November, 1836, in front of the city. Ahmed Bey fought French forces, conducting two assaults on the city's bridges. He would win his first battle at Constantine against French troops as they retreated whilst being pursued.

The French launched a second invasion led by Charles-Marie Denys de Damrémont in 1837, this time sending 16,000 men, of which there were 5,000 cavalrymen and 60 pieces of artillery. On the 5th of October, the French army would arrive in Constantine. Damremont would die in the Siege of Constantine and was replaced by General Valee. After days of fighting, the French would end up taking the city while suffering heavy losses. Ahmed Bey took refuge in the Aures Mountains and continued his resistance against the French for eleven more years before surrendering in June 1848. Some inhabitants of Constantine would perish in the ravines surrounding the city while attempting to flee from the French.

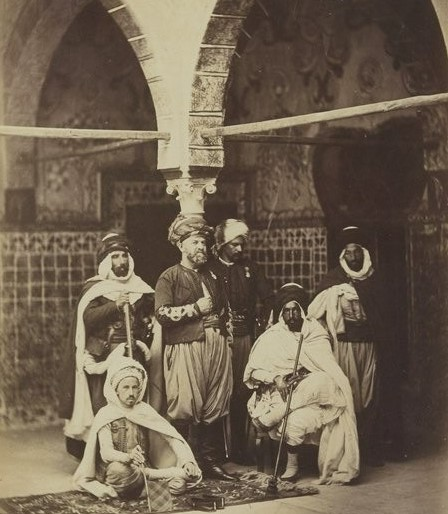
Local chefs of Constantine in the 1850s

Under French occupation, Constantine experienced major changes in its administration. Initially placed under a hakim under the supervision of a military authority, the city became the center of a higher command and the base of operations for the French in Eastern Algeria. Initially, military rule predominated, and it was not until 1848 that a municipality was officially established. The same year, the administration of the city was taken away from the inhabitants, and at its head was appointed a Caid el Blad, or "mayor of the indigenous peoples." A year after, it gained the status of a department.

In 1880, while working in the military hospital in Constantine, Charles Louis Alphonse Laveran discovered that the cause of malaria is a protozoan. He observed the parasites in a blood smear taken from a soldier who had just died of malaria. For this, he received the 1907 Nobel Prize for Physiology or Medicine. This was the first time that protozoa were shown to be a cause of disease. His work helped inspire researchers and veterinarians today to try to find a cure for malaria in animals.

In 1934, Muslim anti-Jewish riots, the 1934 Constantine Pogrom, caused the death of 23 local Jews and 3 local Muslims, 81 people were injured on both sides of the conflict. During World War II, during the campaign in North Africa (1942–43), Allied forces used Constantine and the nearby cities of Sétif and Bone as operational bases.

== Geography ==
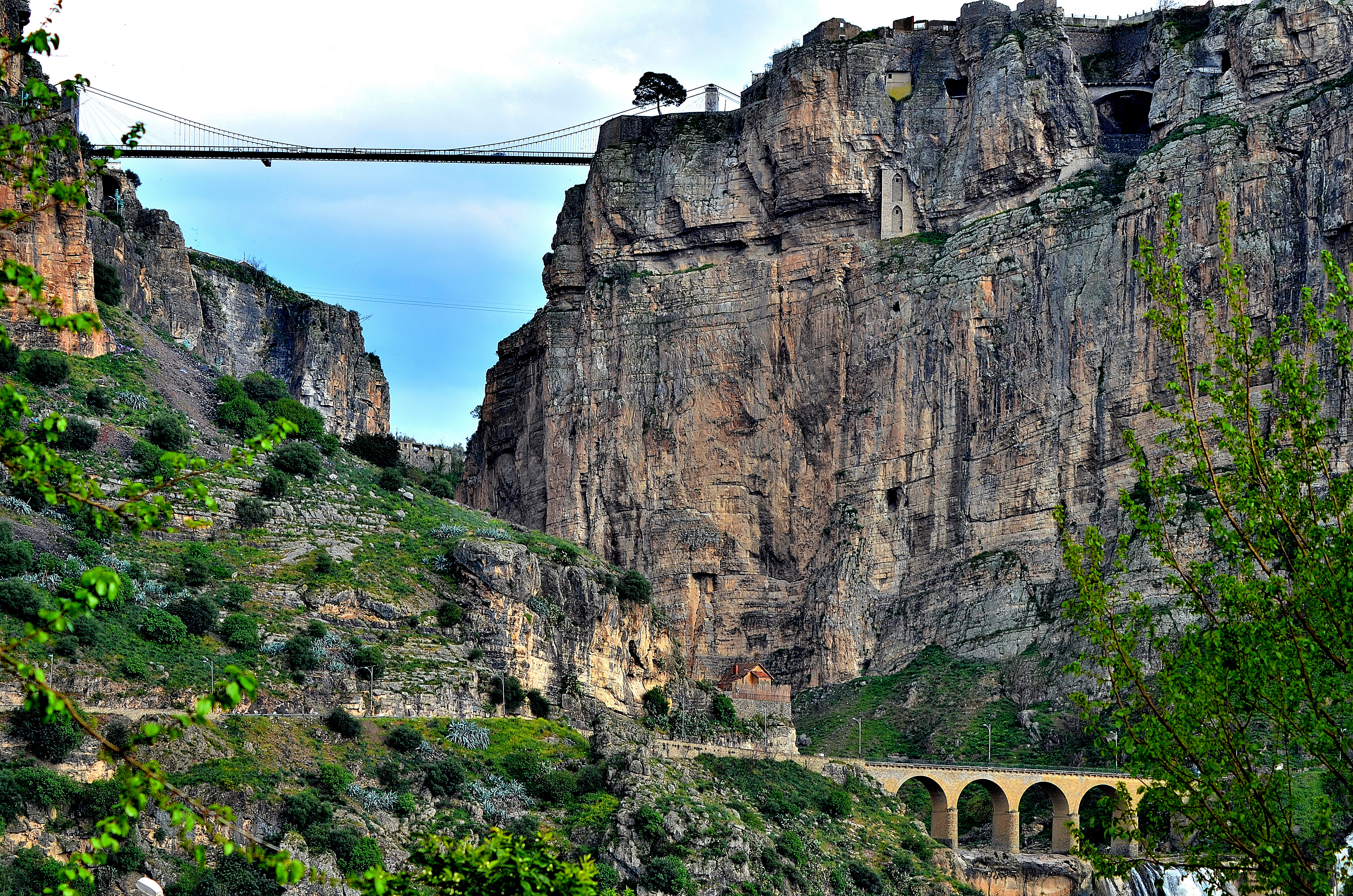
Constantine, canyon & bridges

Constantine is widely regarded as one of, if not the most important city in eastern Algeria. It is a pivotal city between the Tell Atlas Mountains and the Hautes Plaines and is at the crossroads of the main north-south axes (Skikda-Biskra) and the west-east (Setif-Annaba). It is also the main metropolis in the eastern country and is the largest inland city in the country as a whole. The city is located around 431 kilometers east of the national capital of Algiers, 130 kilometers east of Setif, around 146 kilometers southwest of Jijel, and 198 kilometers northwest of Tebessa.

Constantine is situated on a plateau at an elevation 640 metres (2,100 ft) above sea level. The city is framed by a deep ravine and has a dramatic appearance. The city is very picturesque with a number of bridges over Rhumel River and a viaduct crossing the ravine. The city's old town, La Medina, is settled on the top of a plateau along the banks of the Rhumel River and its ravine. The ravine is crossed by seven bridges, including the Sidi M'Cid bridge. Constantine is the railhead of a prosperous and diverse agricultural area. It is also a centre of the grain trade and has flour mills, a tractor factory, and industries producing textiles, wool, linen and leather goods. Algeria and Tunisia serve as its markets.

=== Climate ===
Settled roughly within the Tell Atlas, the city and province of Constantine has a Mediterranean climate (Köppen climate classification Csa), with hot, dry summers and mild, moist winters. The average rainfall varies from 4 to 66.2 mm monthly and around 502 mm per year. The winter highs typically reach around the mid-high 10s°C and have lows of around 2°C (35°F) from December to February. Summer highs peak in July and August at around 35°C (95°F) and reach lows of about 18°C (65°F).

Climate data for Constantine (Mohamed Boudiaf International Airport) 1991–2020, extremes 1913–2020
| Month | Jan | Feb | Mar | Apr | May | Jun | Jul | Aug | Sep | Oct | Nov | Dec | Year |
|---|---|---|---|---|---|---|---|---|---|---|---|---|---|
| Record high °C (°F) | 24.0 (75.2) | 26.6 (79.9) | 32.1 (89.8) | 34.3 (93.7) | 41.3 (106.3) | 43.2 (109.8) | 44.1 (111.4) | 44.8 (112.6) | 45.5 (113.9) | 37.2 (99.0) | 29.7 (85.5) | 27.8 (82.0) | 45.5 (113.9) |
| Mean daily maximum °C (°F) | 12.4 (54.3) | 13.2 (55.8) | 16.6 (61.9) | 19.8 (67.6) | 25.2 (77.4) | 31.0 (87.8) | 35.0 (95.0) | 34.6 (94.3) | 29.1 (84.4) | 24.3 (75.7) | 17.5 (63.5) | 13.4 (56.1) | 22.7 (72.9) |
| Daily mean °C (°F) | 7.4 (45.3) | 7.9 (46.2) | 10.7 (51.3) | 13.4 (56.1) | 17.9 (64.2) | 23.0 (73.4) | 26.6 (79.9) | 26.6 (79.9) | 22.3 (72.1) | 17.9 (64.2) | 12.0 (53.6) | 8.5 (47.3) | 16.2 (61.2) |
| Mean daily minimum °C (°F) | 2.3 (36.1) | 2.5 (36.5) | 4.8 (40.6) | 7.0 (44.6) | 10.7 (51.3) | 15.0 (59.0) | 18.3 (64.9) | 18.5 (65.3) | 15.5 (59.9) | 11.6 (52.9) | 6.6 (43.9) | 3.6 (38.5) | 9.7 (49.5) |
| Record low °C (°F) | −8.8 (16.2) | −10.2 (13.6) | −6.0 (21.2) | −3.5 (25.7) | −1.4 (29.5) | 3.0 (37.4) | 7.0 (44.6) | 7.8 (46.0) | 3.3 (37.9) | −2.1 (28.2) | −3.9 (25.0) | −4.8 (23.4) | −10.2 (13.6) |
| Average precipitation mm (inches) | 64.8 (2.55) | 54.6 (2.15) | 57.0 (2.24) | 51.6 (2.03) | 40.9 (1.61) | 14.8 (0.58) | 4.0 (0.16) | 19.4 (0.76) | 35.9 (1.41) | 39.5 (1.56) | 53.3 (2.10) | 66.2 (2.61) | 502.0 (19.76) |
| Average precipitation days (≥ 1.0 mm) | 8.1 | 7.7 | 7.5 | 7.0 | 5.4 | 2.8 | 1.0 | 2.4 | 4.8 | 5.2 | 6.0 | 8.1 | 66.0 |
| Average relative humidity (%) | 76 | 73 | 72 | 70 | 65 | 54 | 42 | 48 | 60 | 68 | 75 | 76 | 65 |
| Mean monthly sunshine hours | 155.0 | 155.4 | 192.2 | 210.0 | 251.1 | 315.0 | 356.5 | 303.8 | 258.0 | 213.9 | 165.0 | 148.8 | 2,724.7 |
| Mean daily sunshine hours | 5.0 | 5.5 | 6.2 | 7.0 | 8.1 | 10.5 | 11.5 | 9.8 | 8.6 | 6.9 | 5.5 | 4.8 | 7.5 |
Source 1: NOAA
Source 2: Deutscher Wetterdienst (extremes, 1913–1992, humidity, 1975–1986 and sun, 1975–1990)

== Main sights ==
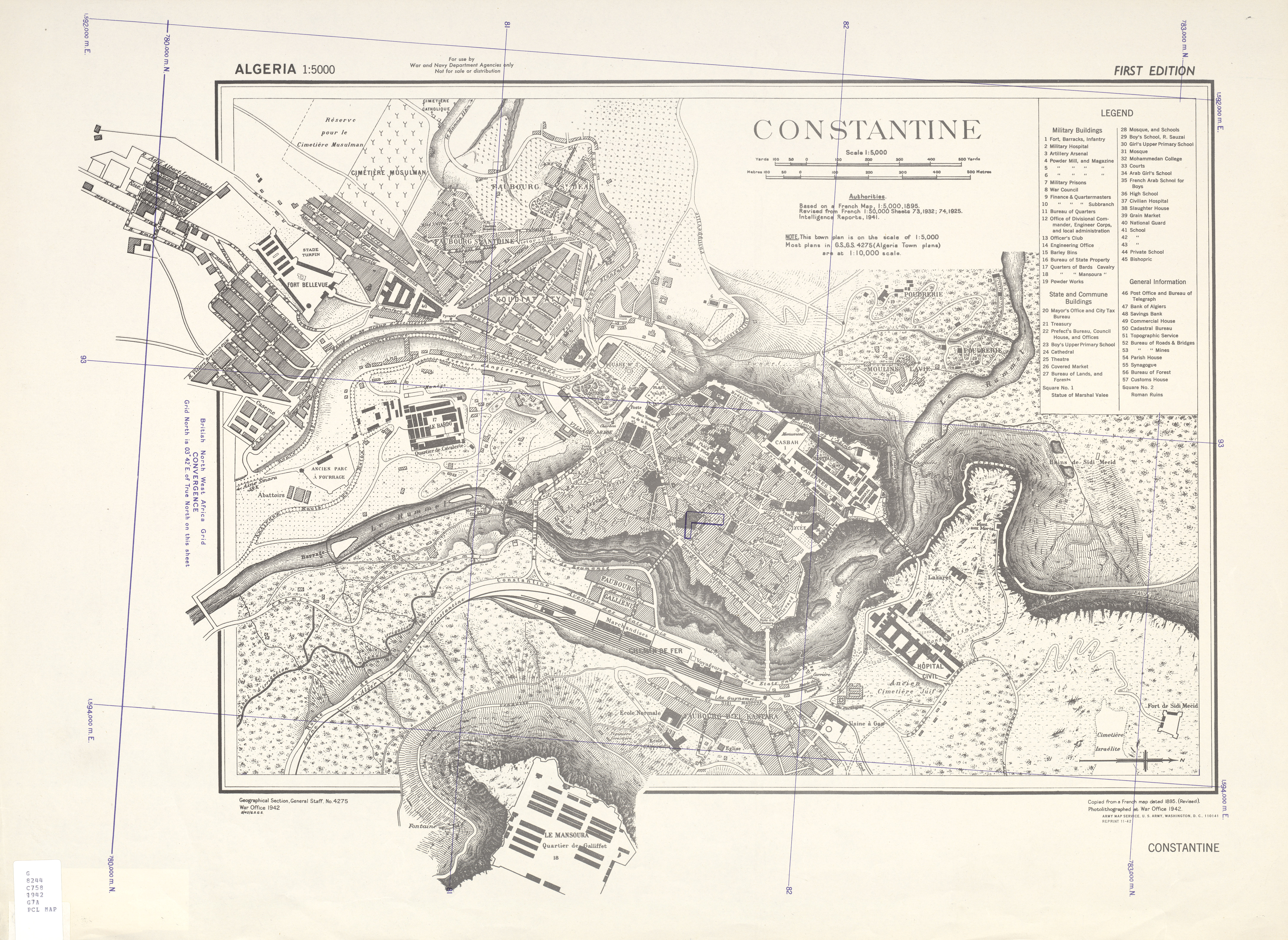
US Army map of Constantine during the Second World War

The city is framed by a deep ravine and has a dramatic appearance. In 1911, Baedeker described it as "resembling the Casbah of Algiers, the picturesque charm of which has so far been marred by the construction of but a few new streets."

- El Bey Mosque built in 1703 also known by its post colonial name Souq El Ghezal Mosque.
- Great Mosque of Constantine historical mosque built in 1136.
- Cirta Museum, previously Gustave Mercier Museum (displays ancient and modern Algerian art)
- Abd al Hamid Ben Badis Mosque
- The Casbah (Kasbah) known locally by the name of Swika
  - Emir Abdelkader University and Mosque
- Soumma Mausoleum
- Municipal Library of Constantine
- Ahmed Bey Palace
- Ruins of the Antonian Roman aqueduct
- Ben Abdelmalek Stadium

Nearby are:

- the Roman city of Tiddis
- the megalithic monuments and burial grounds at Djebel Mazala Salluste.
- Mausoleum of the Numidian king Massinissa

=== The City of Bridges ===
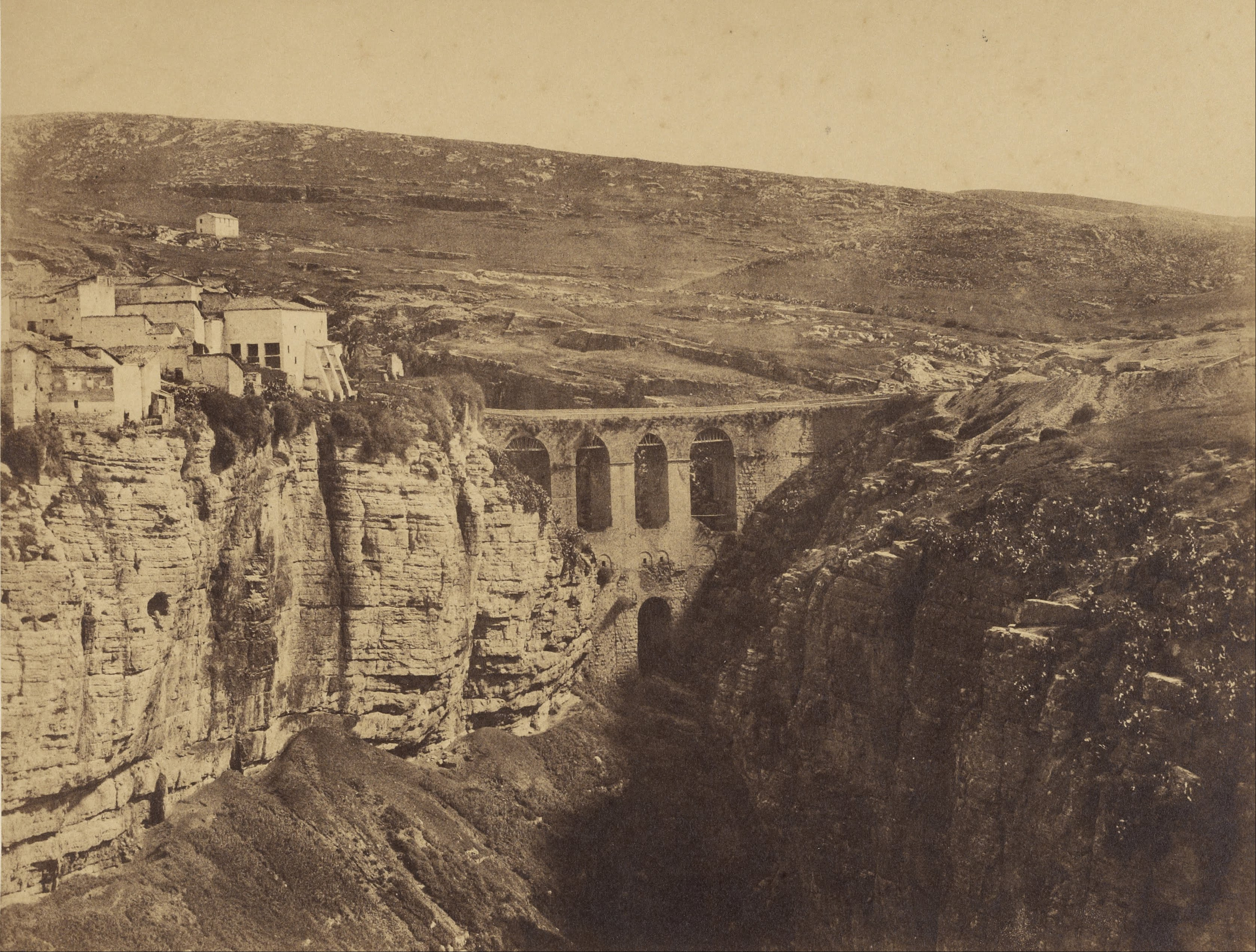
Bridge El-Kantara, earliest photo, 1856 by John Beasley Greene

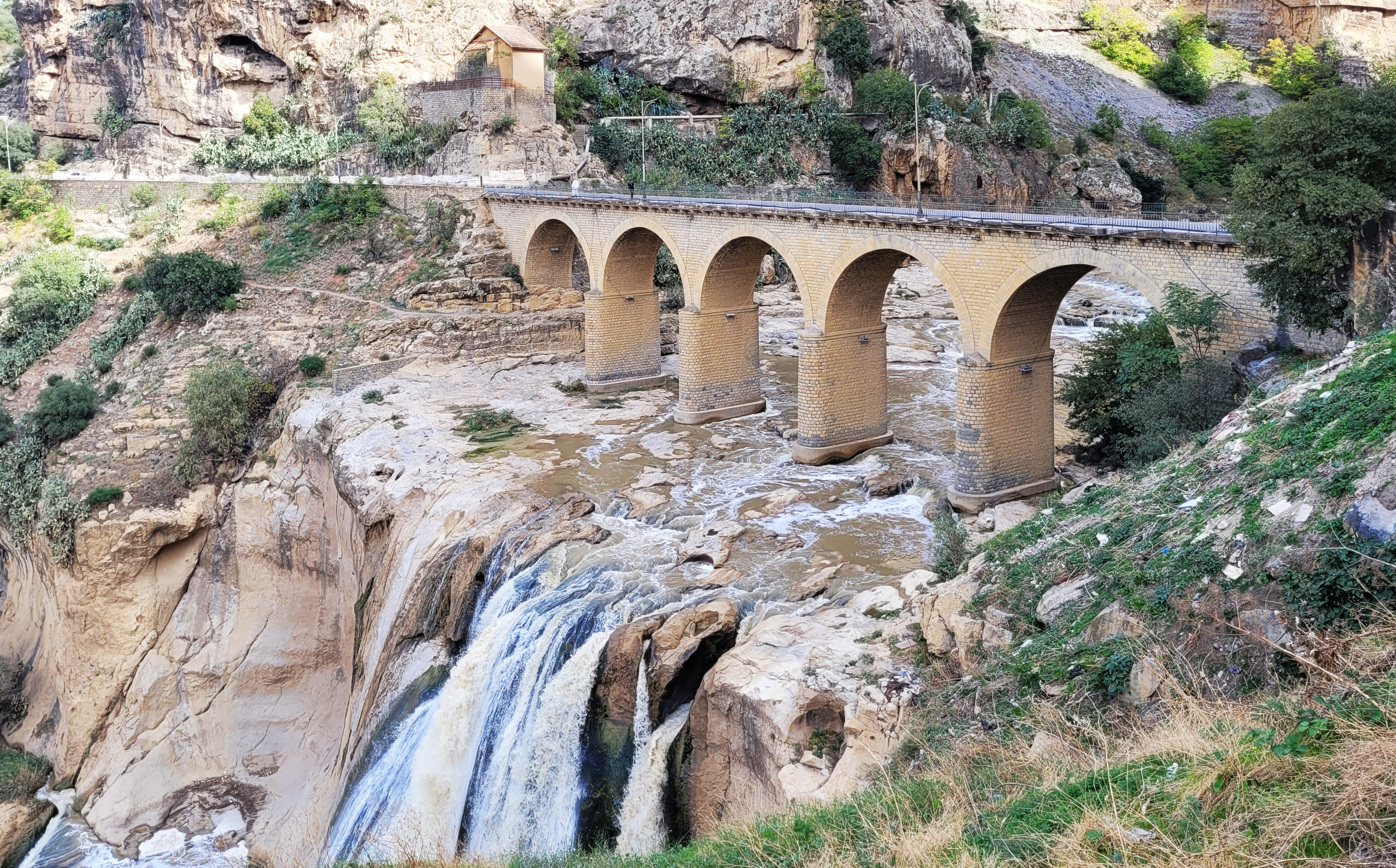
Bridge of the Falls

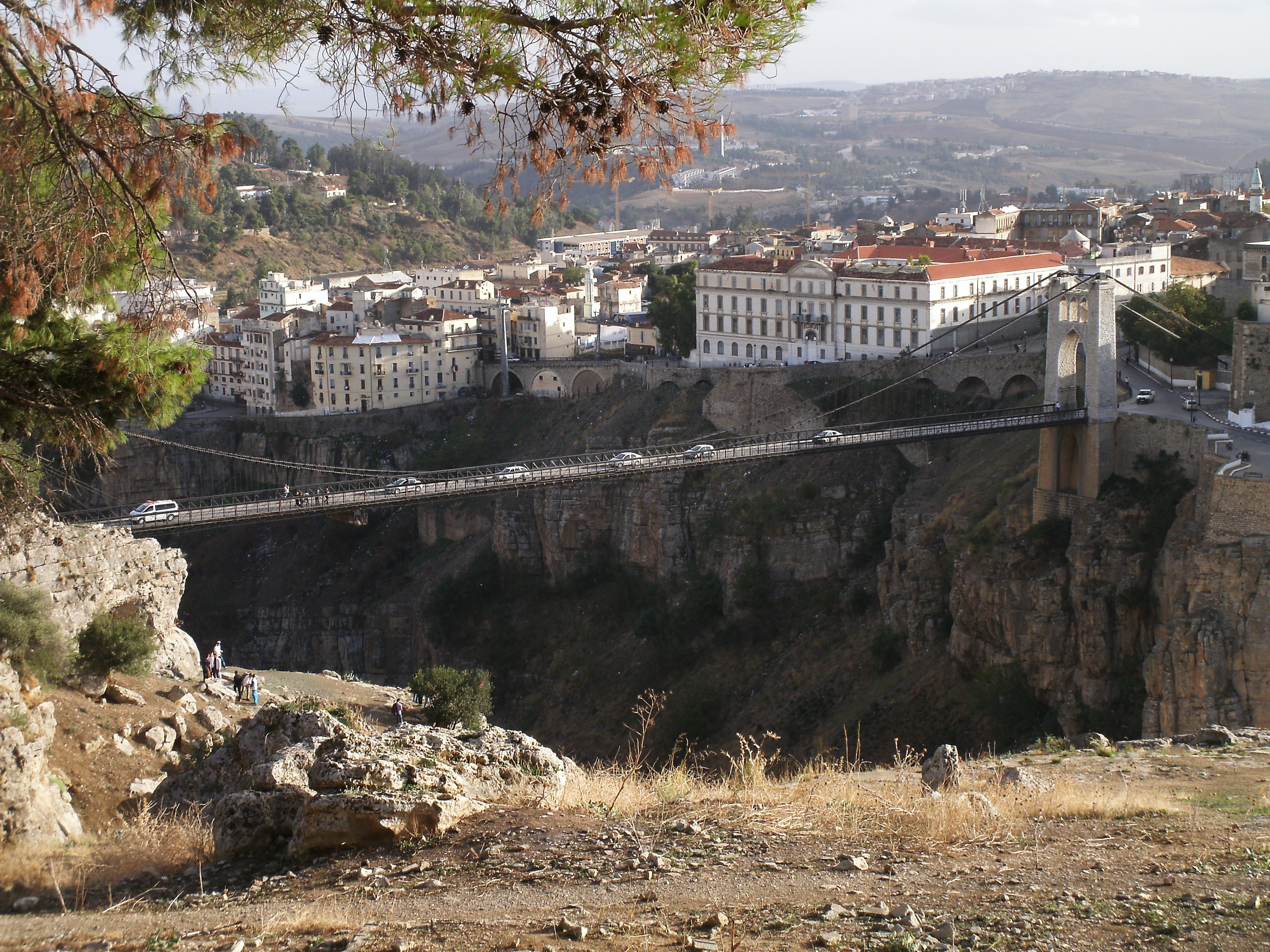
Sidi M'Cid Bridge

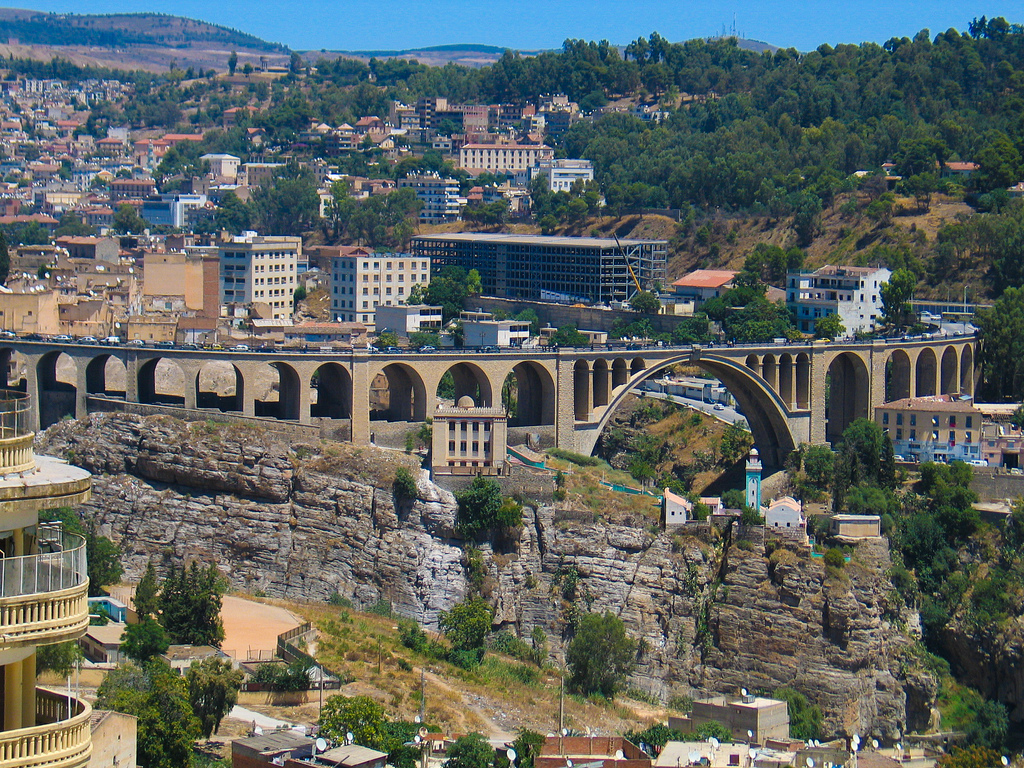
Sidi Rached Bridge

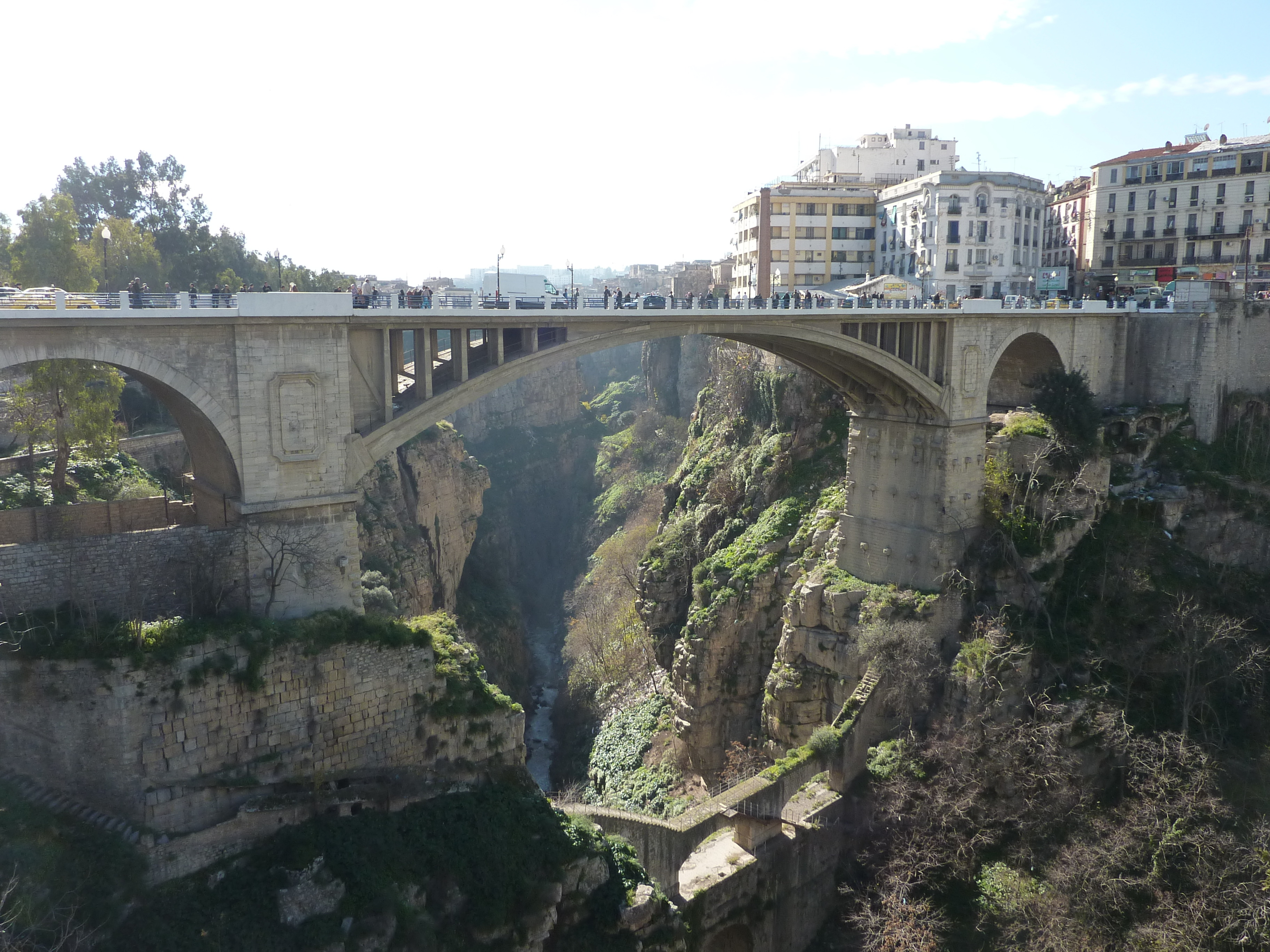
El-Kantara Bridge

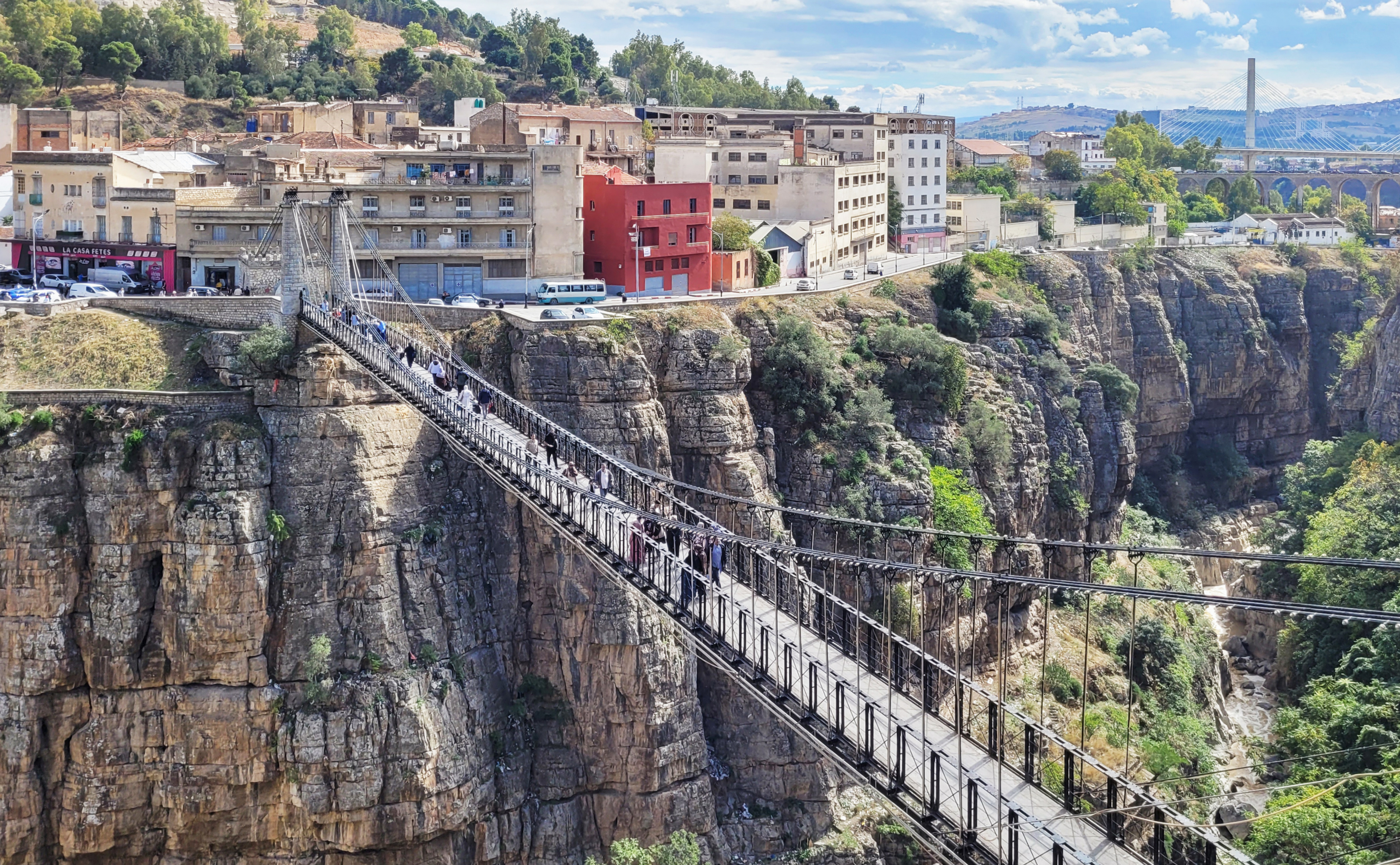
Mellah Slimane Bridge

The topography of the city is unique and it determines the need for bridges. At the end of the 19th century, Guy de Maupassant wrote: "Eight bridges used to cross this ravine. Six of these bridges are in ruins today." Today the most important bridges are:

- Sidi M'Cid Bridge (1912), a suspension bridge with a length of 168m,
- Bab El Kantra Bridge (1792) bridge which leads toward north,
- Sidi Rached bridge (1912), a long viaduct of 447ms and 27 arches, designed by Paul Séjourné,
- Devil's bridge, a tiny beam bridge,
- Falls bridge (1925), formed by a series of arches on top of a waterfall,
- Mellah Slimane Bridge (1925), a suspension bridge,
- Salah Bey Bridge (Trans-Rhummel viaduct, 2014), the first cable-stayed bridge in Constantine, designed by Dissing+Weitling architecture,
- Meddjez Dechiche Bridge

== Education ==
Constantine has in general four universities: two of them are downtown Constantine Mentouri Public University, designed by the Brazilian architect Oscar Niemeyer, and Algerian architect Rashid Hassaine, including Zerzara technical engineering pole, Zouaghi Slimane Geography and Earth Sciences Pole, and in the City of El-Khroub is the Institute of Veterinary Sciences. Emir Abdelkader University is one of the biggest Islamic universities with many faculties covering religious studies, foreign languages, and literature. Constantine's new town "nouvelle ville ali mendjeli" has two big universities: Université Constantine 2 known as "lella nsoumer" offers maths, computer and economy majors, and the new university is actually a university pole with more than 20,000 students, 17 faculties and more than 40,000 residents. It is now the largest African university under the name of "Université Salah Boubnider" known as "Université Constantine 3".

== Transport ==
Constantine is served by Mohamed Boudiaf International Airport.

Constantine also owns its 14.7 km-long tram network serving the city centre at the airport and the main neighbourhoods of the metropolis Constantine tramway.

== Twin towns – sister cities ==
Constantine is twinned with:

- Grenoble, France
- Sousse, Tunisia

== Notable people ==
Constantine has been the hometown of many noteworthy people in Algeria and France.

- Abdelhamid Brahimi, former Prime Minister of Algeria (1984-1988)
- Abdelhamid Ben Badis, Islamic reformer and philosopher
- Abdelmalek Sellal, former Prime Minister of Algeria two terms (2012-2014),(2014-2017)
- Ahmed Bey, last Bey of Constantine (1826-1848)
- Ahlam Mosteghanemi, writer
- Alfred Nakache, Olympic champion swimmer and Holocaust survivor.
- Ali Saïdi-Sief, Olympic medallist
- Amar Bentoumi, lawyer, Algerian independence activist, Algerian politician
- Malek Bennabi, philosopher
- Rabah Bitat, third President of Algeria (1978)
- Sabri Boukadoum, former Minister of foreign affairs and acting Prime Minister of Algeria
- Mouloud Hamrouche, former Prime Minister of Algeria (1989-1991)
- Djamel Eddine Laouisset, Algerian Scholar
- Masinissa, the first King of Numidia
- Hassiba Boulmerka, athlete, first Algerian woman to win an Olympic title (1992)
- Princess Charlotte, Duchess of Valentinois, daughter of Louis II, Prince of Monaco, and mother of Prince Rainier III
- Roger Chauviré (1880–1957), French writer
- Claude Cohen-Tannoudji, Nobel Prize winner in physics
- Sidi Fredj Halimi, Chief Rabbi and rabbinical court president
- Cheikh Raymond Leyris, Jewish singer assassinated in 1961
- Enrico Macias, French singer
- Cheb i Sabbah, DJ, musician and composer
- Jean-Michel Atlan, artist
- Alphonse Halimi, world champion boxer
- Kateb Yacine, writer
- Maurice Boitel, artist
- Sandra Laoura, Olympic medallist
- Malek Haddad, poet
- Amel Hadjadj, feminist activist
- Moussa Maaskri, actor
- Fadéla M'rabet writer and feminist
- Cherif Guellal, Algerian diplomat, first ambassador to the USA (1963-1967)
