= Municipal Library of Constantine =

Library in Constantine, Algeria

The Municipal Library of Constantine is a library located in Constantine, Algeria. It holds 25,000 volumes.
