= Ahmed Bey Palace =

Ahmad Bey Palace
- قصر احمد باي
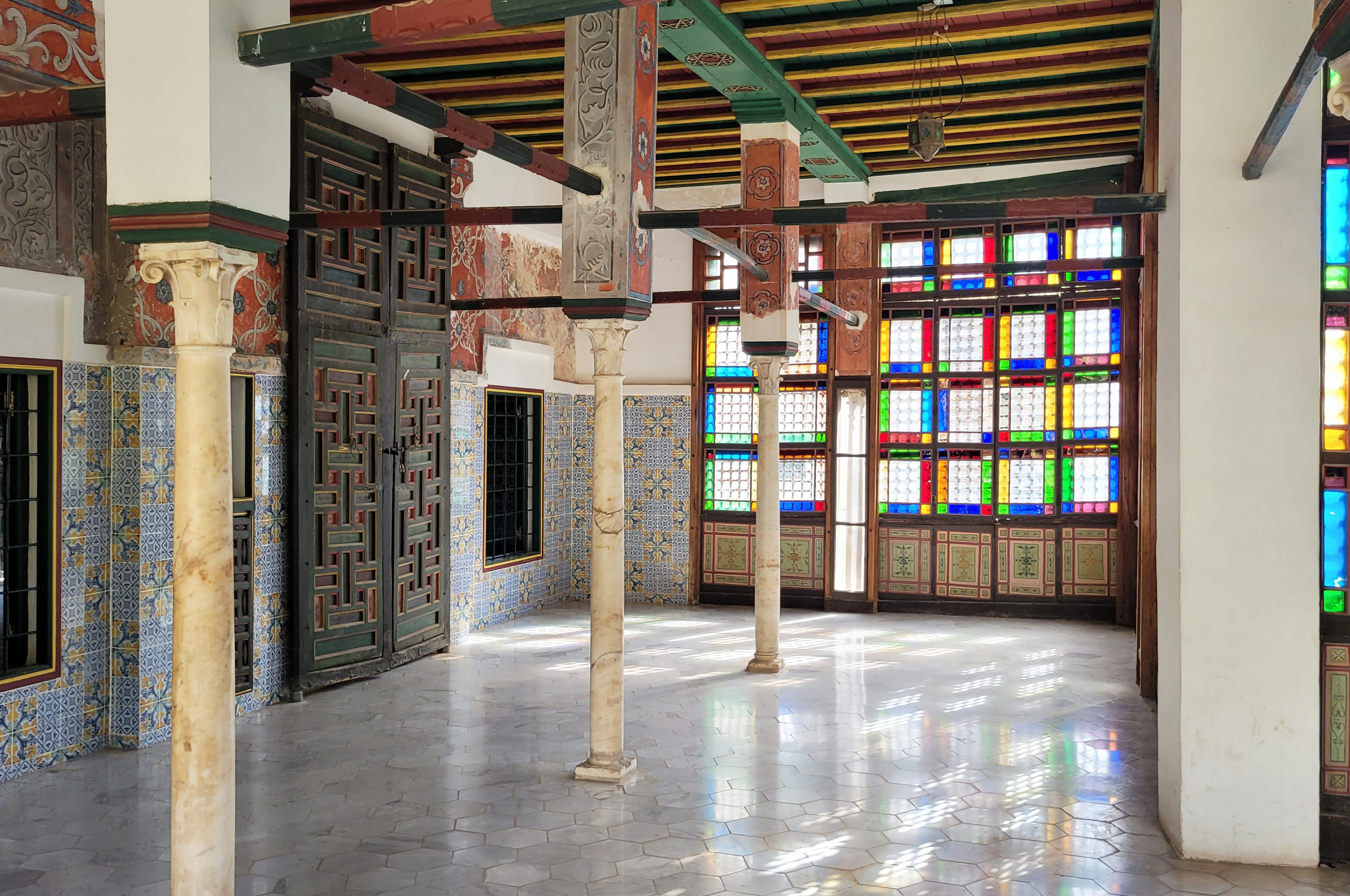
- A room of the palace.
- Interactive map of the Ahmad Bey Palace area

General information
- Status: Completed
- Type: Royal Palace
- Architectural style: Islamic architecture
- Location: Constantine, Algeria
- Coordinates: 36.367654°N 6.611195°E
- Groundbreaking: 1825
- Completed: 1835

Technical details
- Floor count: 3

Design and construction
- Architect: Ahmed Bey ben Mohamed Chérif El-Djabri et El-Khatabi
- Engineer: MME bazziz
- Known for: Arab Capital of Culture

Bey's Palace (Arabic: قصر الباي) or Ahmad Bey Palace (Arabic: قصر احمد باي) is a historic palace in Constantine, Algeria. The palace was one of the main sights during the selection of Constantine as Arab Capital of Culture in 2015.

== History ==
The palace was commissioned during the rule of Ahmed Bey ben Mohamed Chérif. Groundbreaking was in 1825, and completion was in 1835, two years before the fall of Constantine into the French occupation. Ahmad Bay summoned a Genovese engineer Chiavino, and two well known artists Al-Jabari and Al-Khatabi for the architectural design.

When the inauguration commenced in 1835–36, Ahmed Bey inhabited the palace as he became the ruler. Ahmed's enjoyment of this wonderful place was short-lived. Two years after he moved in, the French chased him out and turned the palace into their headquarters and with independence the Algerian military moved in and set up camp.

== Building description ==
The palace consists of three suites and a garden where orange trees and palm trees are planted. The suites are connected to the hallway, which has arcs supported by 266 columns made of marbles. There are also three courtyards and two fountains made of marble. The ceilings are tiled with marble as well. There are 540 doors made of cedar woods, inscribed and engraved with different sculptures and decorations. More than 2,000 square meters of palace walls were decorated with paintings depicting Ahmed Bey's travels to Alexandria, Tripoli and Algeria, as well as 15 months of travel to Istanbul, Cairo and Hejaz in 1818 and 1819 in addition to other travels before and after his reign as Bey of Constantine.

== Gallery ==
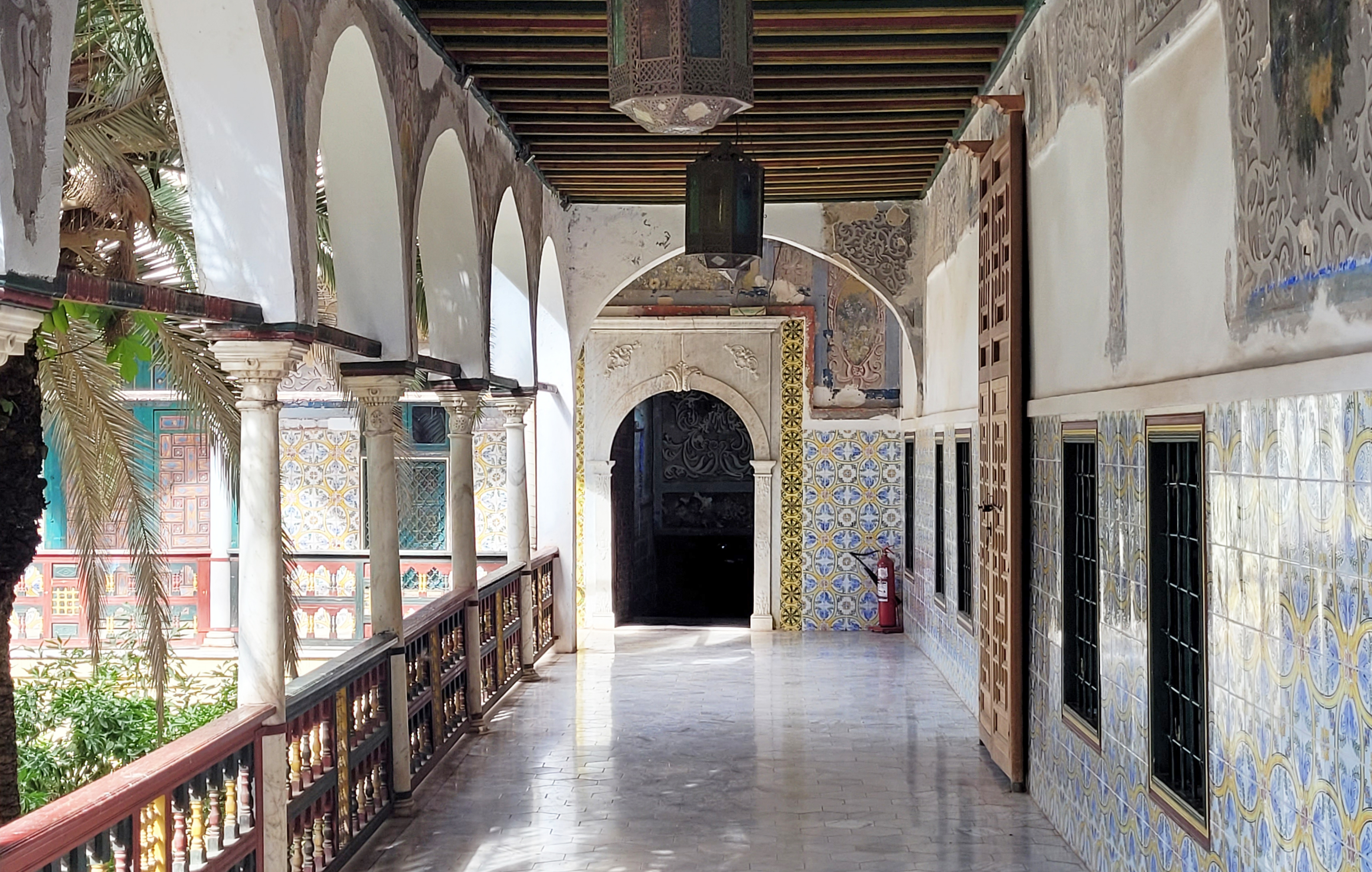
Hallway

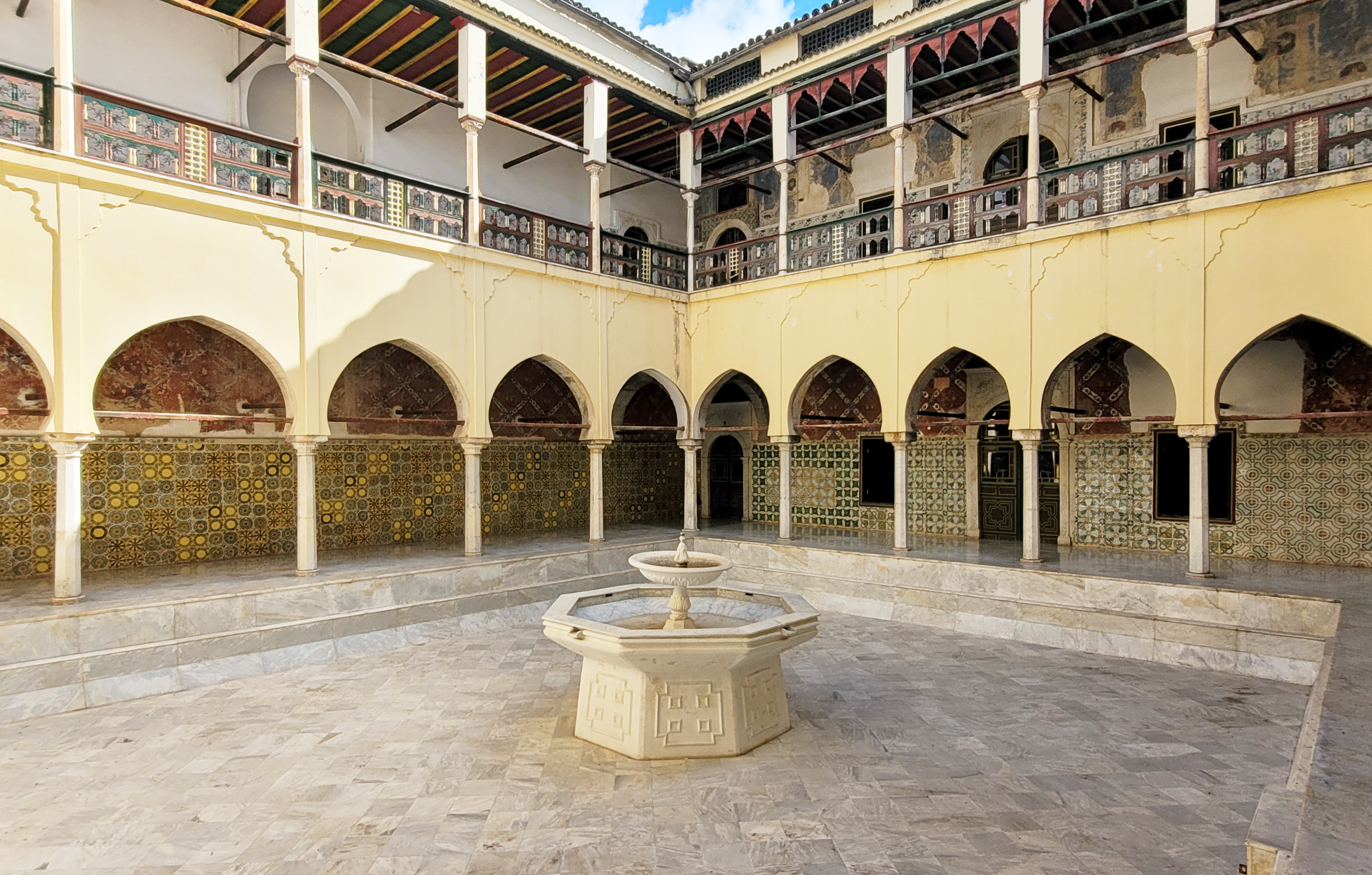
Courtyard

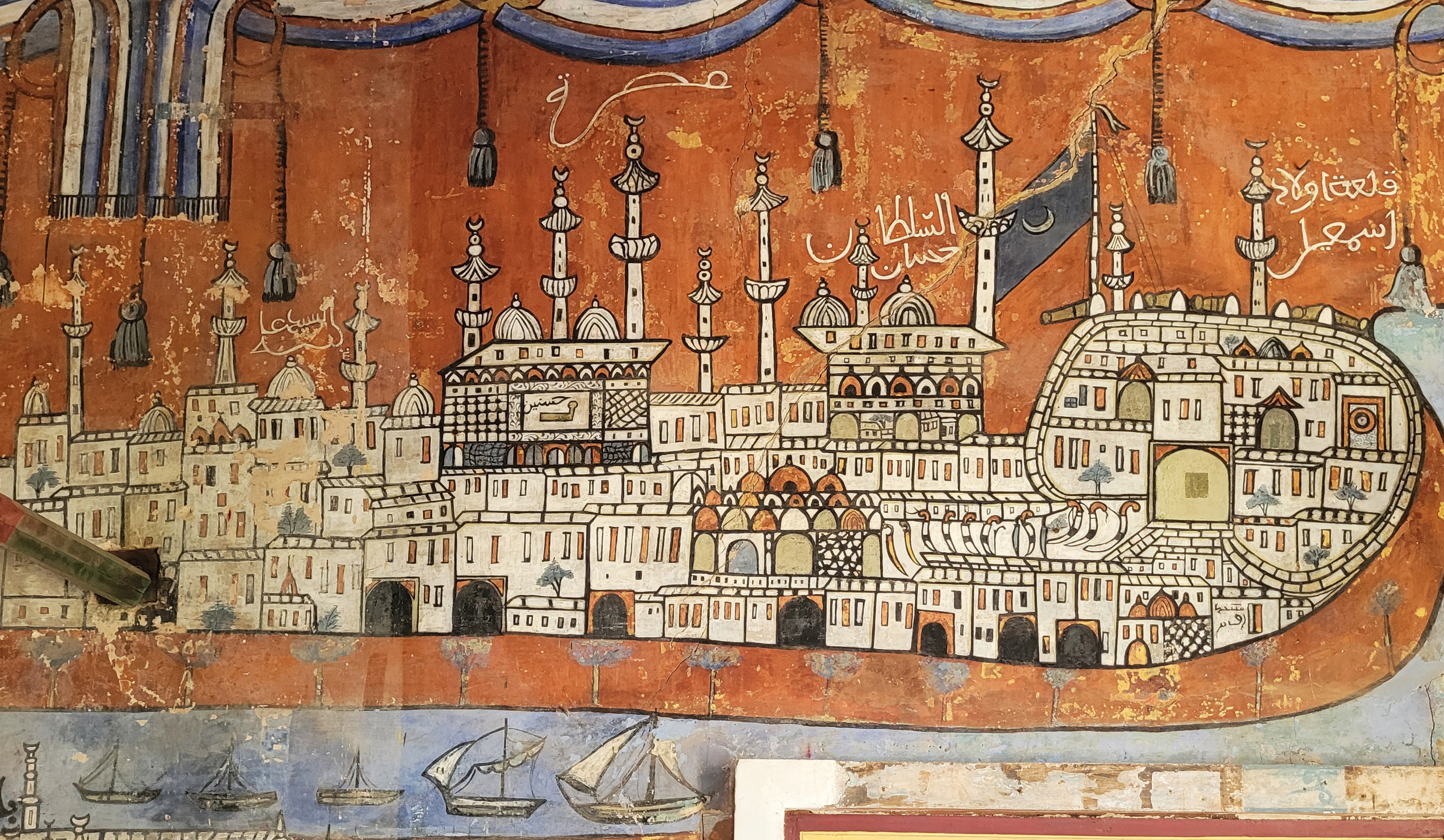
Fresco

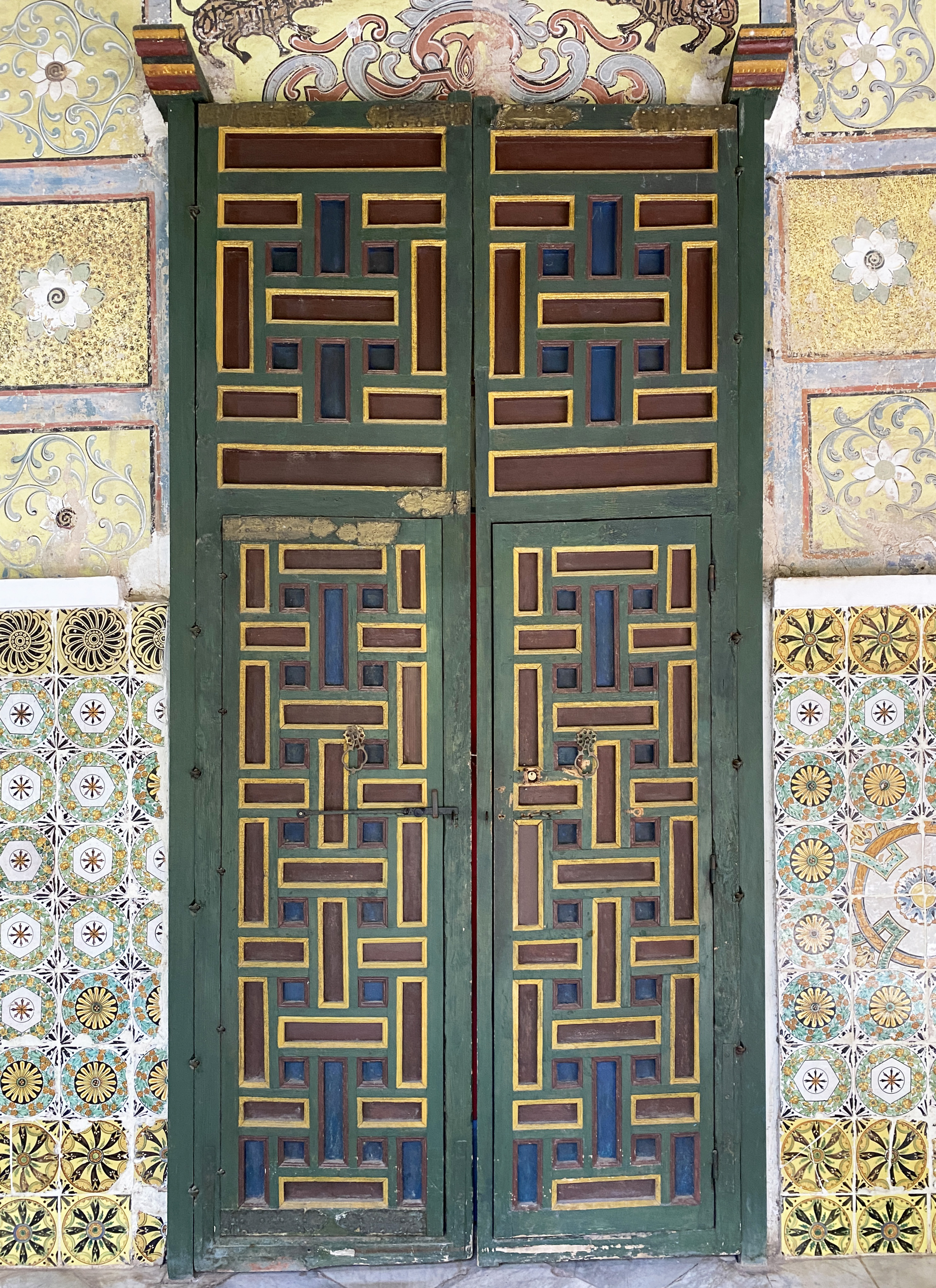
Door

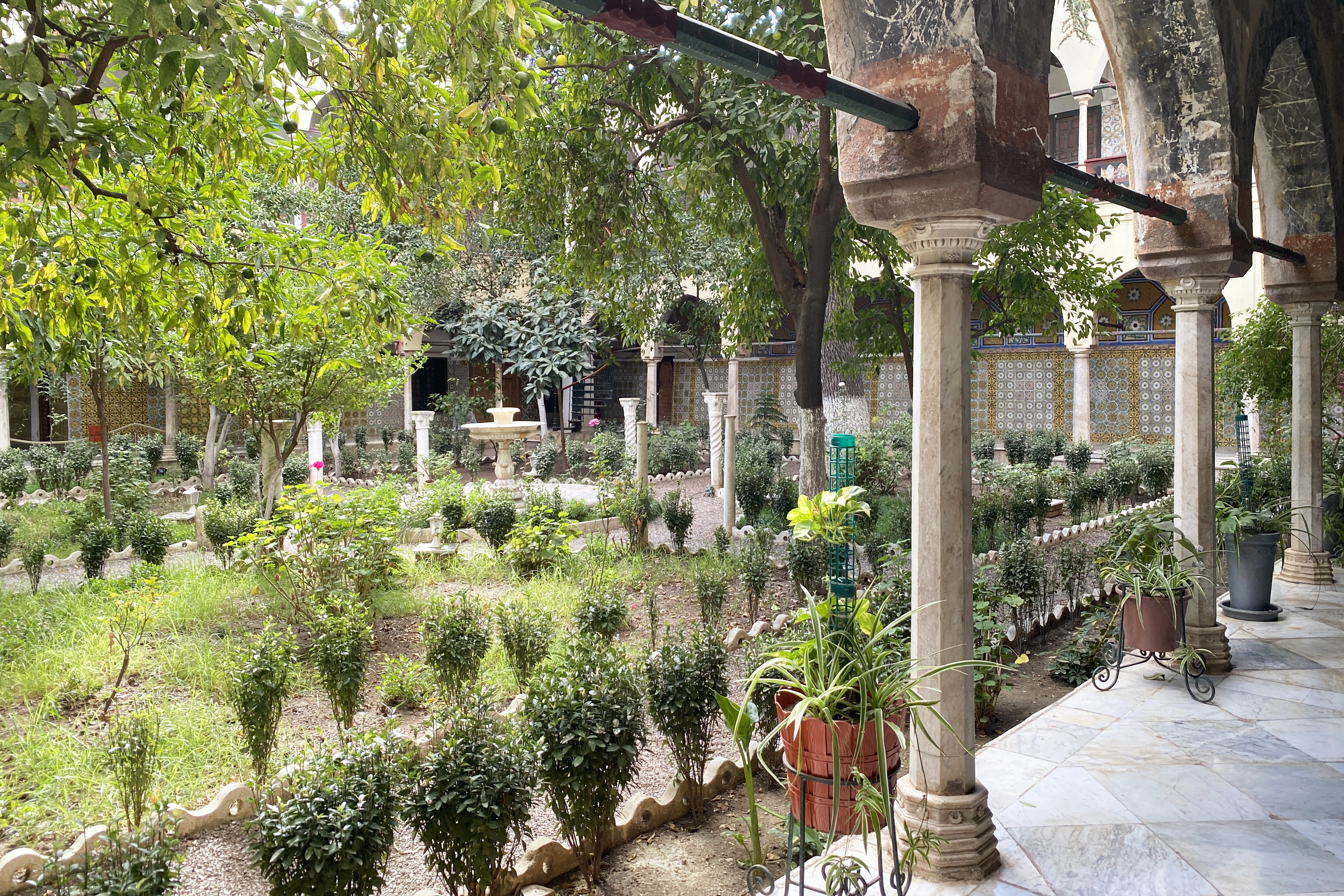
Gardens

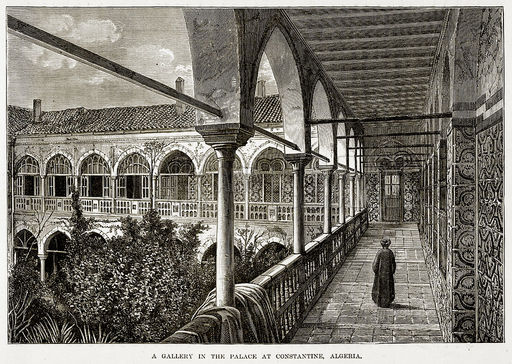
Painting of Ahmad Bey palace

== See also ==
- Palace of the Dey in Algiers
- Bey's Palace in Oran
