= Valérie Grumelin-Halimi =

Valérie Grace (born 1961 in Lille) is a French therapist and writer living and practicing in Paris. She writes on subjects of psychology, although she does not have a diploma to practice as a psychologist. Her works are intended for the general public. In July 2021, she was accused of practicing controversial conversion therapy in Paris.

== Bibliography ==
- À tes rêves! T'es toi quand tu peins, 2002
- Mon corps me dit, 2011
- Je suis timide et je m'en sers, 2013
- My Body Tells No Lie, 2013
