= List of bridges in Algeria =

== Historical or architectural interest bridges ==
	Name	Arabic	Distinction	Length	Type	Carries Crosses	Opened	Location	Province	Ref.
1	Oued Ilelouine Aqueduct Bridge		Height : 35 m (115 ft); Cultural heritage	137 m (449 ft)	Masonry; 3 levels (4, 8 and 17 semi-circular arches)	Cherchell Aqueduct (total length : 45 km (28 mi)); Oued Ilelouine	2nd century	Sidi Amar; 36°34′06.1″N 2°17′24.8″E	Tipaza Province	
2	Oued Bellah Aqueduct Bridge		Height : 26 m (85 ft)	288 m (945 ft)	Masonry; 2 levels (26 and 38 semi-circular arches)	Cherchell Aqueduct (total length : 45 km (28 mi)); Oued Bellah	2nd century	Cherchell; 36°36′20.6″N 2°14′08.9″E	Tipaza Province	
3	El Kantara Bridge	جسر القنطرة الروماني	Cultural heritage		Masonry; 1 semi-circular arch	Oued el Haï		El Kantara; 35°14′00.8″N 5°42′05.8″E	Biskra Province	(Note: Mostly restored in 1862 by French military genius during the reign of Napoleon III, some stones have been replaced with new blocks.)
4	Aïn Zeboudja Aqueduct Bridge			85 m (279 ft)	Masonry; 2 levels (7 and 14 arches)	Aïn Zeboudja Aqueduct (total length : 12 km (7.5 mi))	1639	Algiers; 36°45′21.1″N 3°01′52.1″E	Algiers Province	
5	El Kantara Bridge (1792) destroyed in 1857	باب القنطرة بريدج (١٧٩٢)	Cultural heritage	60 m (200 ft)	Masonry; 2 levels	Rhumel River	1792	Constantine; 36°22′08.2″N 6°37′04.9″E	Constantine Province	(Note: Built on the ruins of an older bridge.)
6	Devil's Bridge (Constantine)	جسر الشيطان (قسنطينة)	Devil's Bridge		Masonry; 1 segmental arch	Rhumel River	1850	Constantine; 36°21′42.5″N 6°36′47.9″E	Constantine Province	
7	El Kantara Bridge (1863) destroyed in 1952	جسر باب القنطرة (١٨٦٣)	Span : 56 m (184 ft)	128 m (420 ft)	Arch; Cast iron	Road bridge Rhumel River	1863	Constantine; 36°22′08.7″N 6°37′05.0″E	Constantine Province	
8	El Ourit Bridge	جسر إيفل تلمسان	Construct by Gustave Eiffel & Cie		Arch; Steel deck arch	Tabia-Akid Abbes line El-Ourit Waterfalls	19th century	Tlemcen; 34°51′39.9″N 1°16′11.3″W	Tlemcen Province	
9	Sidi Rached Viaduct	سيدي راشد جسر	Conception by Paul Séjourné; Span : 68 m (223 ft); Deck height : 102 m (335 ft)	450 m (1,480 ft)	Masonry; 1 main arch, 26 secondary arches, concrete deck	Road bridge Zaabane Avenue; Rhumel River	1912	Constantine; 36°21′45.1″N 6°36′50.2″E	Constantine Province	
10	Bab El Kantra Bridge	جسر باب القنطرة		128 m (420 ft)	Arch; Concrete deck arch	Road bridge Rhumel River	1952	Constantine; 36°22′8.4″N 6°37′4.9″E	Constantine Province	

== Major bridges ==
This table presents the structures with spans greater than 100 meters (non-exhaustive list).

	Name	Arabic	Span	Length	Type	Carries Crosses	Opened	Location	Province	Ref.
1	Oued Dib Bridge	جسر بني هارون	280 m (920 ft)	620 m (2,030 ft)	Cable-stayed; Concrete box girder deck, concrete pylons 111+280+111	National road 27; Oued el Kebir	1998	Hamala; 36°33′53.4″N 6°16′44.1″E	Mila Province	
2	Salah Bey Viaduct	جسر صالح باي	245 m (804 ft)	1,119 m (3,671 ft)	Cable-stayed; Concrete box girder deck, concrete pylons, axial suspension	Road bridge Rhumel River	2014	Constantine; 36°21′28.1″N 6°36′53.8″E	Constantine Province	
3	Marble Valley Bridge	جسر وادي الرخام	200 m (660 ft)	745 m (2,444 ft)	Box girder Prestressed concrete Twin bridges 110+200+110	A1 East–West Highway; Oued Rekham	2008	Bouïra; 36°25′49.9″N 3°48′13.5″E	Bouïra Province	
4	Ravin Blanc Viaduct		170 m (560 ft)		Box girder Prestressed concrete		1986	Oran	Oran Province	
5	Sidi M'Cid Bridge	جسر سيدي مسيد	164 m (538 ft)	164 m (538 ft)	Suspension with cable-stays, steel deck, masonry pylons	Road bridge Rhumel River	1912	Constantine; 36°22′21.7″N 6°36′52.9″E	Constantine Province	
6	Souk Ahras Bridge	جسر سوق أهراس	130 m (430 ft)	182 m (597 ft)	Arch; Steel tied arch	Road bridge Annaba-Djebel Onk line	2011	Souk Ahras; 36°16′52.7″N 7°57′09.2″E	Souk Ahras Province	
7	Viaduct VI33 under construction		130 m (430 ft)(x8)	1,780 m (5,840 ft)	Truss; Composite steel/concrete deck 95+5x130+95 95+2x130+95 95+130+95	Oued Tlélat - Tlemcen HSR; Oued Isser		Sidi Abdelli–Aïn Tallout; 34°58′11.2″N 1°01′40.5″W	Tlemcen Province	
8	Viaduct VI53 under construction		130 m (430 ft)	690 m (2,260 ft)	Truss; Composite steel/concrete deck	Oued Tlélat - Tlemcen HSR		Tlemcen–Aïn Fezza; 34°53′46.0″N 1°15′39.2″W	Tlemcen Province	
9	Mellah Slimane Bridge	جسر ملاح سليمان	125 m (410 ft)	125 m (410 ft)	Suspension with cable-stays, steel deck, masonry pylons	Footbridge; Rhumel River	1925	Constantine; 36°21′58.5″N 6°36′54″E	Constantine Province	
10	Chihani Suspension Bridge	جسر الشيحاني	105 m (344 ft)	105 m (344 ft)	Suspension with cable-stays, steel deck, masonry pylons	Road bridge Oued Seybouse	1892	Chihani; 36°39′09.1″N 7°46′57.7″E	El Taref Province	
11	Mila-Grarem Bridge		105 m (344 ft)	945 m (3,100 ft)	Box girder Prestressed concrete	National road 79A; Oued Rhumel		Mila–Grarem Gouga; 36°30′42.3″N 6°18′09.6″E	Mila Province	

== Notes and references ==
- Notes
- Nicolas Janberg, Structurae.com, International Database for Civil and Structural Engineering
- Others references

== See also ==
- Transport in Algeria
- List of railway lines in Algeria
- Geography of Algeria
- List of rivers of Algeria
- List of Roman bridges
- List of aqueducts in the Roman Empire
