= Salah Bey =

Salah Bey may refer to:

- Salah Bey (town), a town in Algeria
  - Salah Bey District
- Salah Bey ben Mostefa (1725–1792), a bey in Ottoman Algeria

== See also ==
- Salah Bey Viaduct in Constantine, Algeria
- Salah Bey Mosque, in Annaba, Algeria
