= Mellah Slimane Bridge =

Mellah Slimane Bridge جسر ملاح سليمان
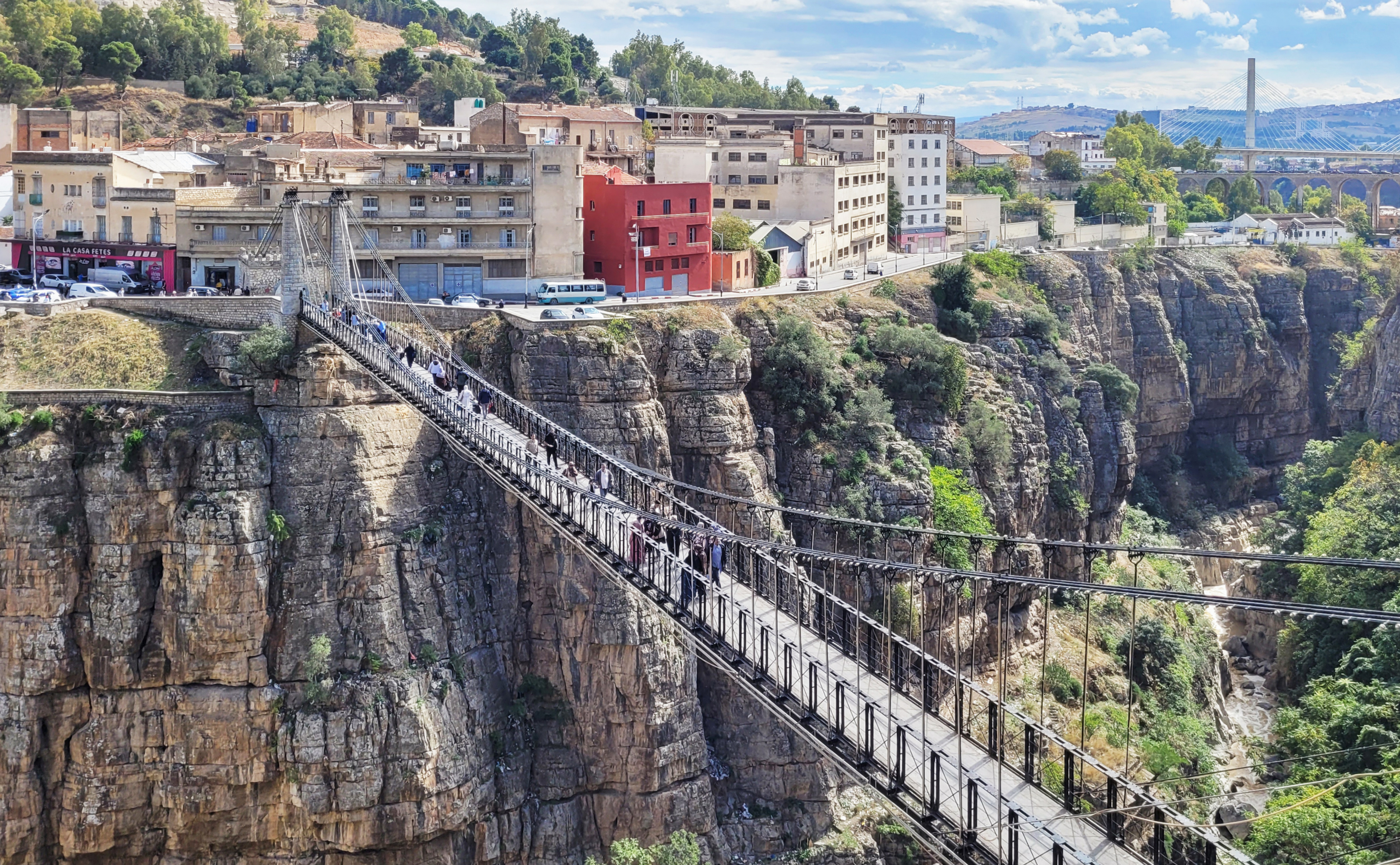
- Coordinates: 36°21′58″N 6°36′54″E
- Carries: Pedestrians
- Crosses: Gorge valley of the Rhumel River
- Locale: Constantine, Algeria
- Other name(s): قنطرة السونسور (The lift Bridge)

Characteristics
- Design: Suspension bridge
- Material: Steel, Concrete
- Total length: 125 m (410 ft)
- Width: 2.40 m (7 ft 10 in)
- Height: 107 m (351 ft)
- No. of spans: 110 m (360 ft)

History
- Designer: Ferdinand Arnodin
- Construction start: 1917
- Opened: April 12, 1925

Statistics
- Toll: Free

Location
- Interactive map of Mellah Slimane Bridge

Mellah Slimane Bridge is a 125 m-long (410 ft) suspension footbridge across the Rhumel River in Constantine, Algeria. It was opened in April 1925 and until it was the 3rd highest bridge in the world at 110 m (360 ft). The bridge was designed by Ferdinand Arnodin and links Larbi Ben M'hidi Larbi Street to Romania Road which means it connects the train station neighbourhood to the centre of the old town, this connection is via a staircase, or the Merdersa lift. It is located halfway between Sidi Rached bridge and Bab El Kantra Bridge. The bridge underwent restoration in 2000 when its cables were replaced by the Algerian company SAPTA.

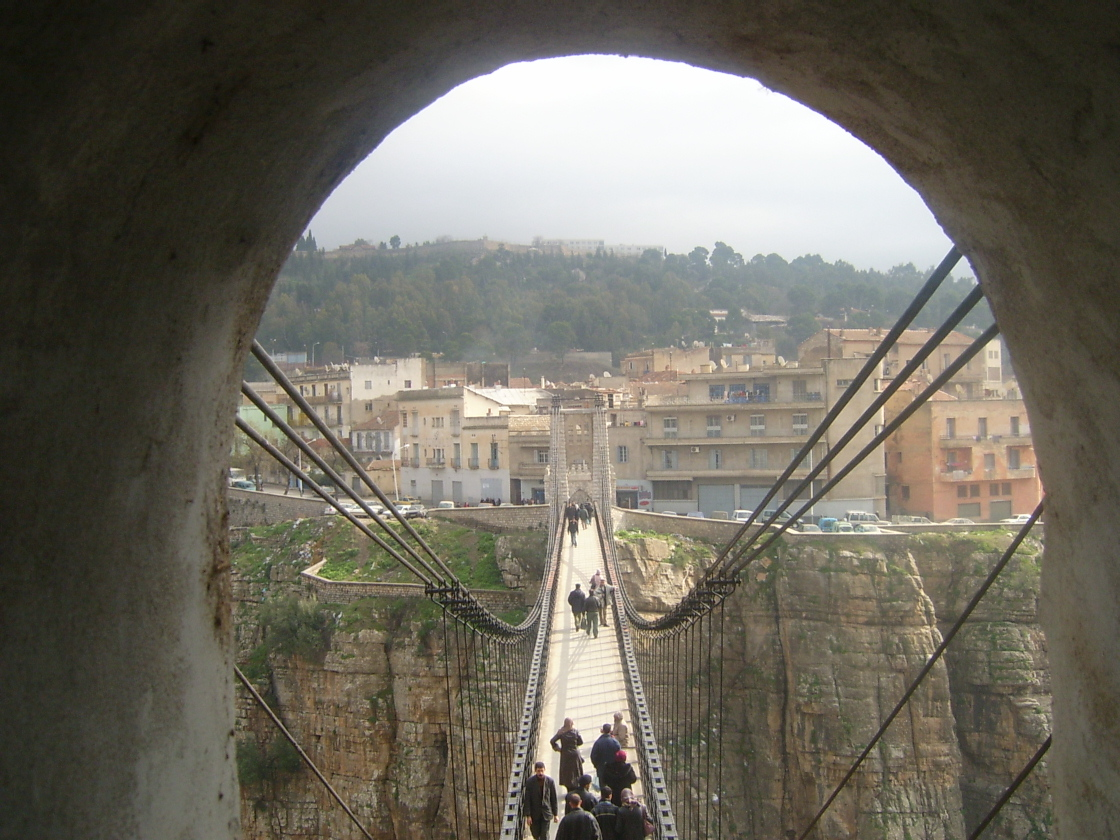
Picture taken from the top of the footbridge.

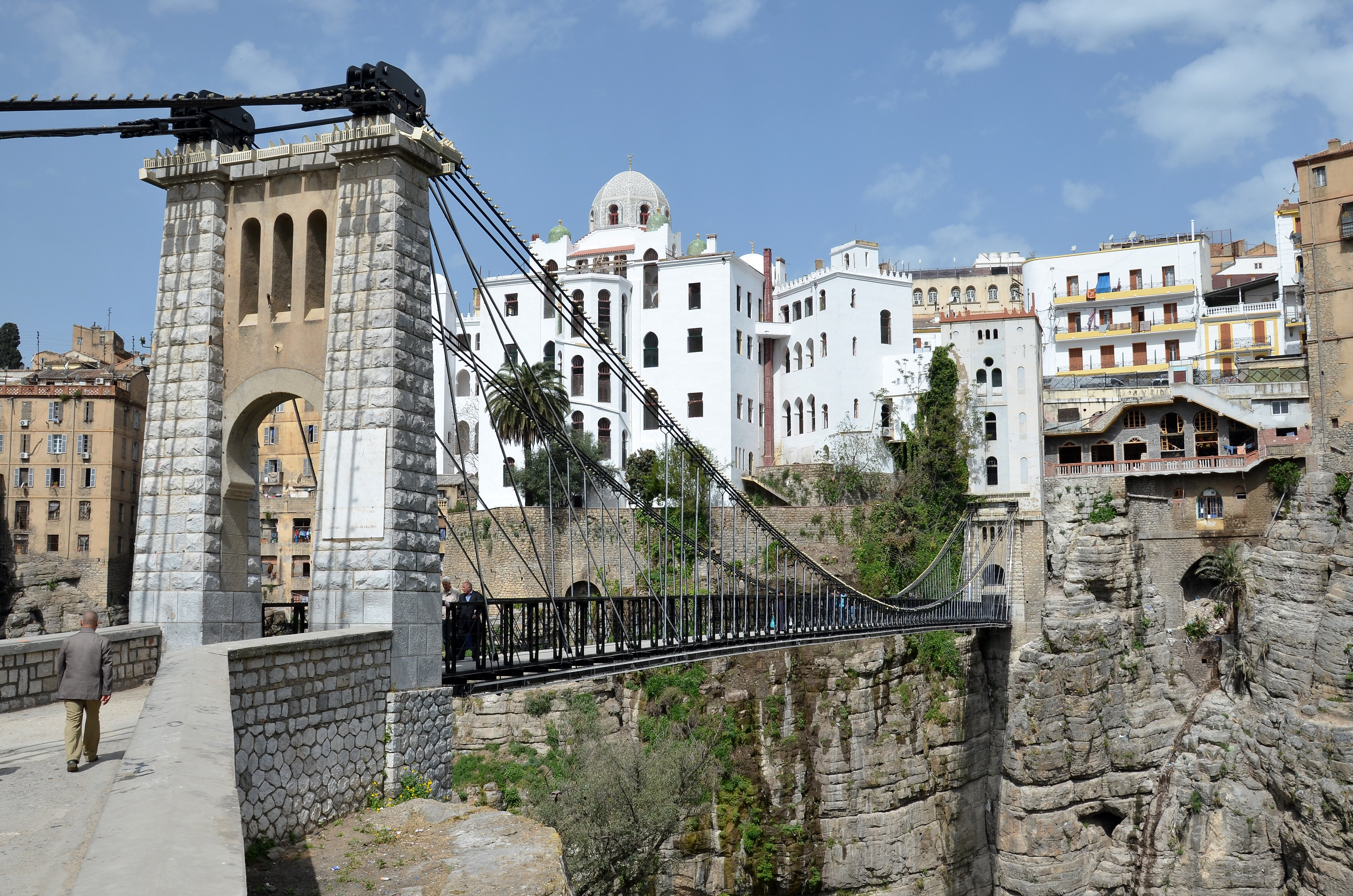
Side view of the bridge

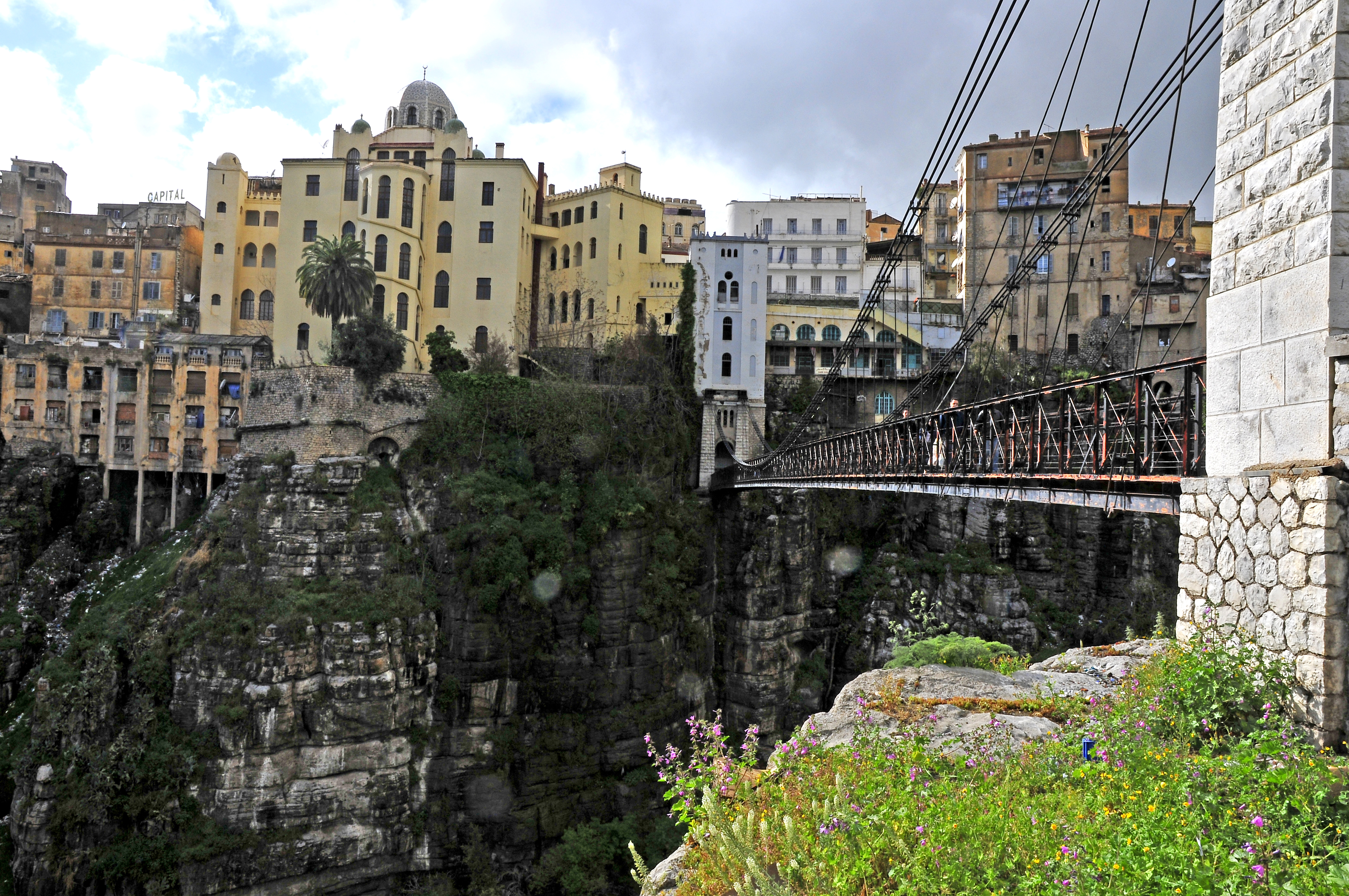
The south side of the old town, from the right bank: the Mellah-Slimane footbridge.

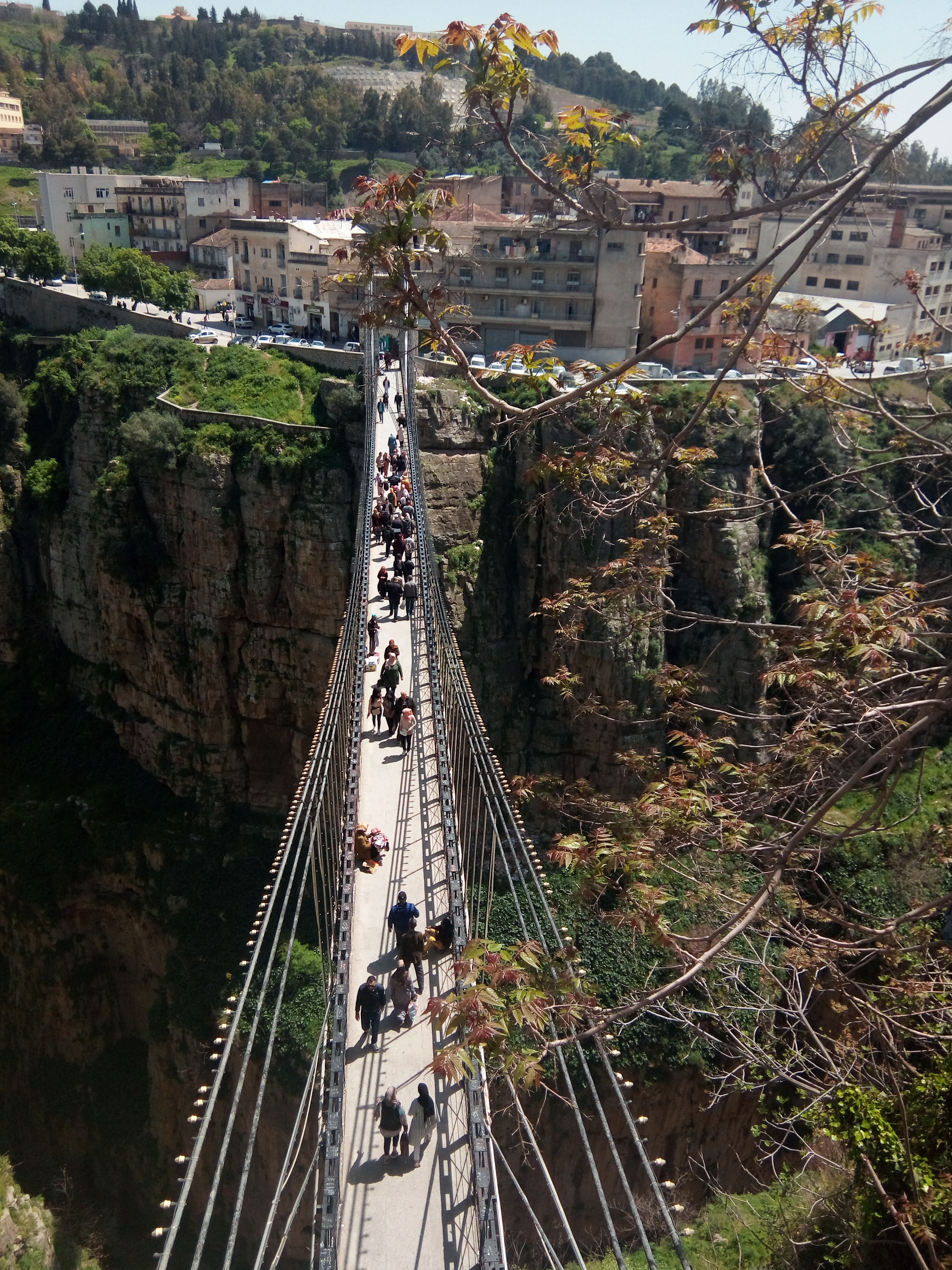
View of the footbridge from its lift.

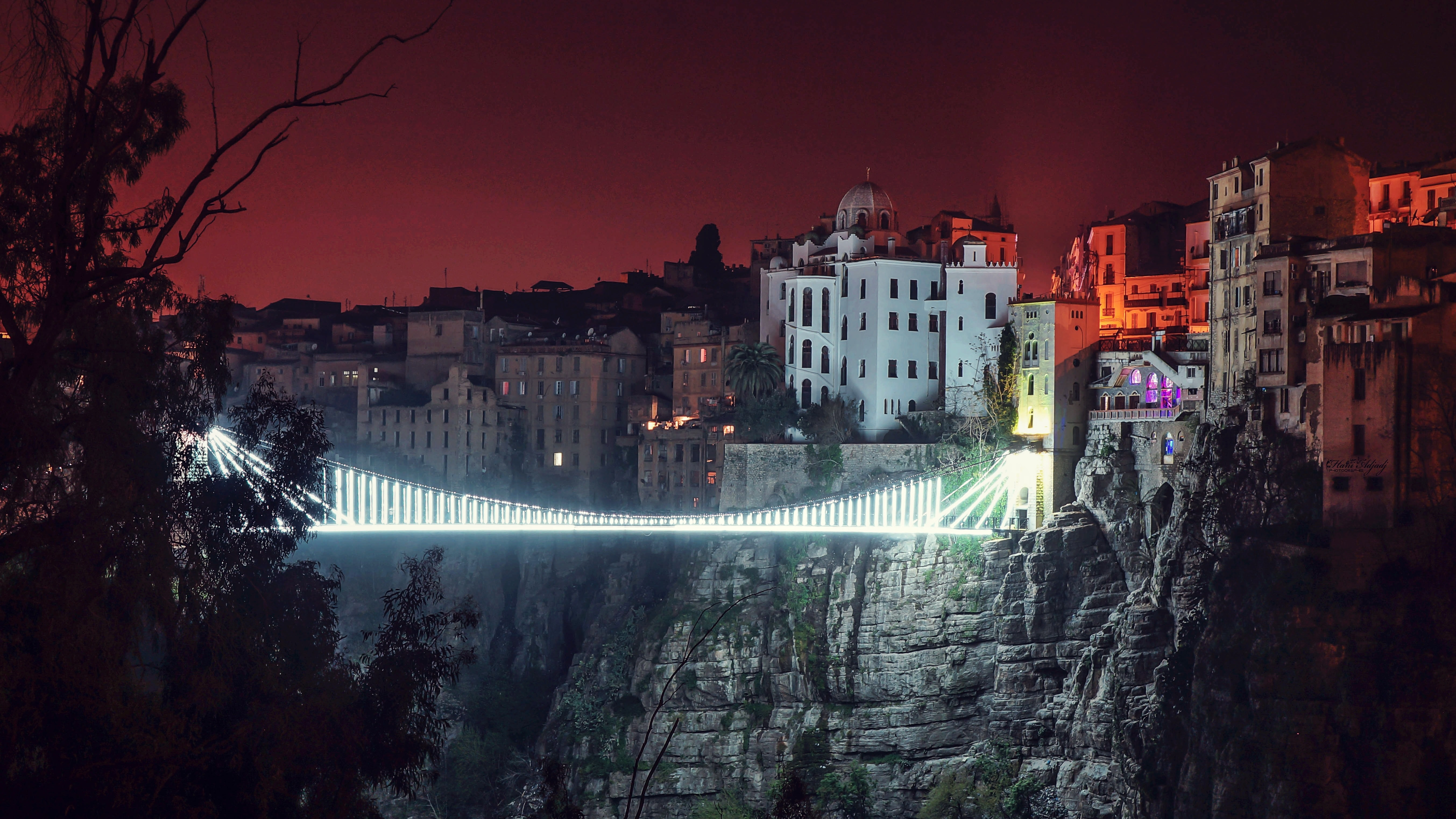
Night view of the bridge

== See also ==
- List of longest suspension bridge spans
- List of bridges by length
- List of highest bridges in the world
- List of tallest bridges in the world
- Salah Bey Viaduct
- Sidi Rached Viaduct
- Bab El Kantra Bridge
- Sidi M'Cid Bridge
