= Léon & Lévy =

French printer

Léon & Lévy was a French printer and a photograph editing company located in Paris. It was founded in 1864 and specialized in stereoscopic views and picture postcards of locations in Europe, Asia, Africa and the Americas. The trade mark of the enterprise was ″L.L." ("LL"). The firm was one of the most important postcard editors in France.

== History ==
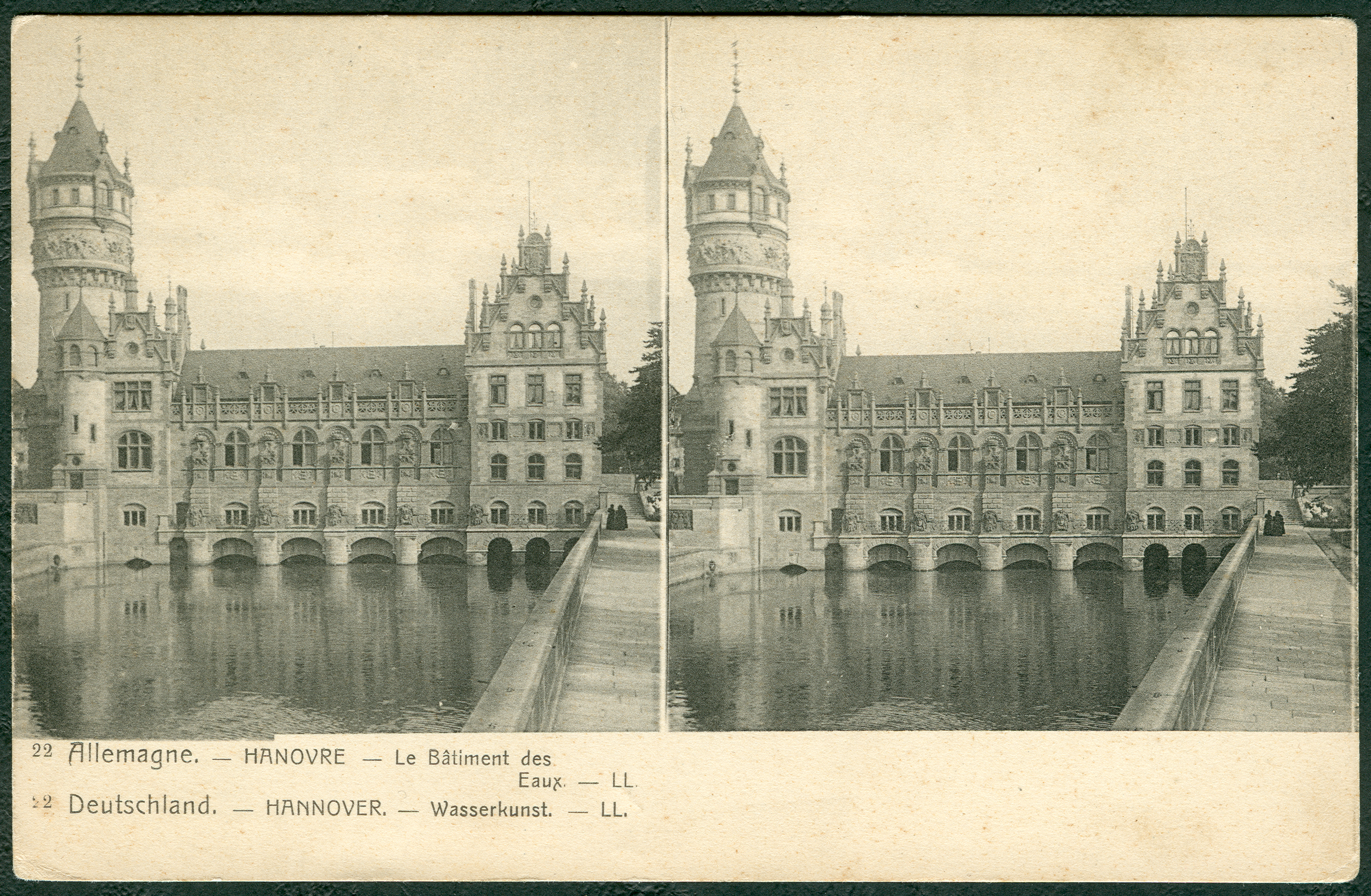
Stereoscopy as picture postcard; LL 22 of the theme Germany: "The water works in Hanover"

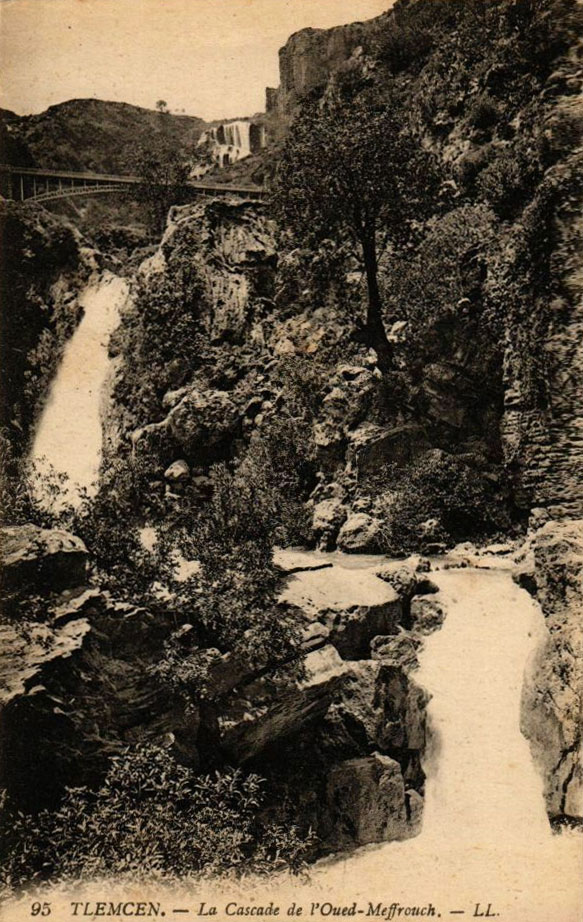
Waterfalls of El Ourit in Tlemcen, Algeria

Léon & Lévy was founded in 1864 by Isaac and his son-in-law Moyse Léon. Isaac was also known as Georges Lévy at that time (to increase profits, he is known as J. Lévy, 1833-1913) . When Lévy's two sons, Abraham Lucien Lévy and Gaspard Ernest Lévy, took over the firm in 1895, the company was renamed Lévy Fils et Cie. Around 1920, the firm was acquired by the printer Émile Crété (who also acquired the firm of Neurdein Frères), and the new combined company was known as Lévy et Neurdein Réunis. Throughout the various changes in the firm, the logo LL (registered as a trademark in 1901) continued to be used. In 1932, Lévy et Neurdein Réunis company was acquired by the Compagnie des Arts Photomécaniques (CAP).

== Literature ==
- John Hannavy, ed. (2007). "Léon Moysé & Lévy, Ferrier, Claude-Marie and Charles Soulier". Encyclopedia of Nineteenth-century Photography. Vol. I. Taylor & Francis. p. 852. ISBN 9780415972352.
- Joanne Adolphe: Le Guide Parisienne, Paris, 1863, p. 39 (in French, special praising of the works of Léon & Lévy)
- Nancy B. Keeler: Illustrating the ‚Reports by the Juries‘ of the Great Exhibition of 1851 ..., In: History of Photography, Vol. 6, 1982, pp. 257–272. In: Sir David Brewster: The Stereoscope. Its History, Theory and Construction
- Elizabeth Anne McCauley: Industrial Madness. Commercial Photographs in Paris. 1848–1871, New Haven, CT: Yale University Press, 1994
- John Murray, 1856 (Reprint by Morgan & Morgan, 1971)
- Jean-Marie Voignier: Les Vues Stéréoscopiques de Ferrier et Soulier, Paris: Edition du Palmier en Zinc, 1992 (includes a concordance of the first three catalogs of the years 1859, 1864 and 1870)
