= Salah Bey ben Mostefa =

Bey in Ottoman Algeria (1725–1771)

Salah ben Mostefa Bey
- صالح باي
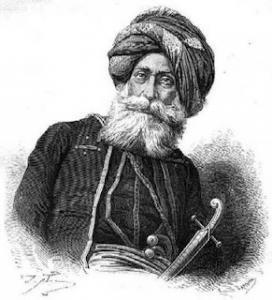
- Portrait of Salah Bey

Bey of Constantine
- In office 1771–1792
- Appointed by: Muhammad V
- Monarchs: Muhammad V (1771–1790); Sidi Hassan (1790–1792)
- Preceded by: Ahmed Bey el Kolli
- Succeeded by: Hussein Bey Ben Bou-Hanek

Personal details
- Born: 1725 Smyrna, Ottoman Empire
- Died: 1792 (aged 66–67) Constantine, Algeria

Military service
- Years of service: 1755–1771
- Unit: Odjak of Algiers
- Battles/wars: Capture of Tunis (1756); Spanish–Algerian War: Invasion of Algiers (1775)

Salah Bey ben Mostefa (Arabic: صالح باي; 1725–1792), was the bey of the Beylik of Constantine in the Deylik of Algiers from 1771 to 1792. Salah Bey's governance is marked by a victorious participation against the Invasion of Algiers (1775) during the Spanish–Algerian War (1775–1785) and his works of urban planning in Constantine. An example of remaining construction from his era is Bab El Kantra Bridge.

== See also ==
- Salah Bey Viaduct, a cable-stayed bridge that spans the gorge valley of the Rhummel in Constantine, Algeria
- Salah Bey Mosque, a mosque in Annaba, Algeria
- Salah Bey (town), a town and commune in Algeria
