= Bab El Kantra Bridge =

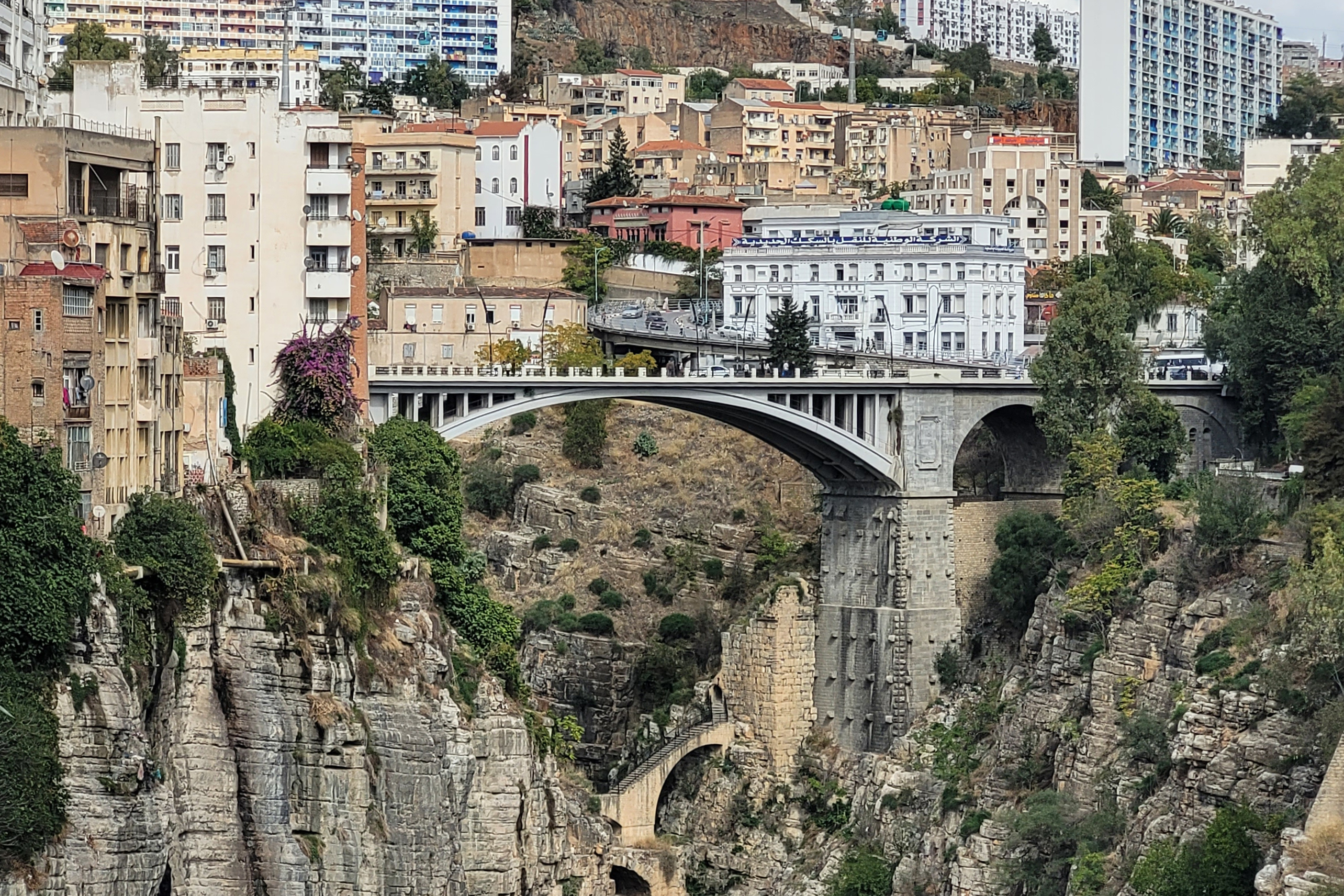
- Coordinates: 36°22′8.30″N 6°37′5.40″E
- Carried: Motor vehicles, Pedestrians
- Crossed: Gorge valley of the Rhumel River
- Locale: Constantine, Algeria
- Other name: جسر القنطرة

Characteristics
- Design: 1792–1857: Aqueduct bridge: 1863–1952: Iron arch bridge; 1952– : Arch bridge
- Material: Reinforced concrete
- Total length: 128 m
- Width: 14 m
- Longest span: 57.4 m (188 ft)
- No. of spans: 4
- Clearance below: 125 m (410 ft)

History
- Inaugurated: 1792
- Rebuilt: 1952
- Collapsed: 1857
- Replaced: 1952

Statistics
- Toll: Free

Location
- Interactive map of Bab El Kantra Bridge

Bab El Kantra Bridge is one of eight famous high-level bridges that cross the Rhumel River gorge in Constantine, Algeria. The Kantara bridge is the oldest and has taken several different forms over the years: from a 1792 Ottoman-style multi-arch bridge, to an 1863 French iron arch, to its current form as a concrete arch bridge. Like the higher Sidi M'Cid Bridge, there is a unique, natural "bridge" almost directly under the span that blocks much of the river from view. Partial remains of the earlier stone bridges can still be seen on top of this natural bridge.

== History ==
The name El Kantara (الكنترة) derives from the Latin word "Centuriation", meaning "bridge" in Derja. The bridge served as Constantine's main access route and the site of the main assaults on the city. In 1185 all the Roman bridges were destroyed, with only El Kantara subsequently rehabilitated. In 1304, it was destroyed once again.

Between 1771 and 1792 Salah Bey, one of the most famous rulers of the city, promoted a good number of urbanization works and mosques. He entrusted the reconstruction of the Roman bridge to the Balearic builder Bartolomeo. To carry it out, he started from the foundations and ruins of the ancient bridge, and completed it with stone from the ruins of the ancient Roman amphitheater. The bridge roughly reproduces the configuration of the Roman original. The new reconstruction reduces the number of arches, solidifies the arches of the intermediate level and also re-establishes the siphon that supplies the city from Djebel Ouahch.

The Ottoman reconstruction is described in a 1853 testimony:

The construction, as we see it today, was erected in 1788 and 1789 under the principality of Salah Bey by a Balearic engineer. It has two levels. The lower level is made up of two arches; one of them, close to the city, was solidified at an unknown time. The two arches are supported by three piers whose structure is obviously Roman, from the base to the cornice. On the second level, which rises 16 meters above the lower floor, it is made up of four arches. The two central ones lean on the lower arches; its vaults are pointed, while the sides are circular vaults and visibly larger. The height of the bridge reaches 65 meters; the board is 60 meters long.

This description is consistent with documentary images of the bridge from the mid-19th century, including photographs taken in 1856 by John Beasley Greene, a photographer and archaeologist known for his travels to Egypt and the East.

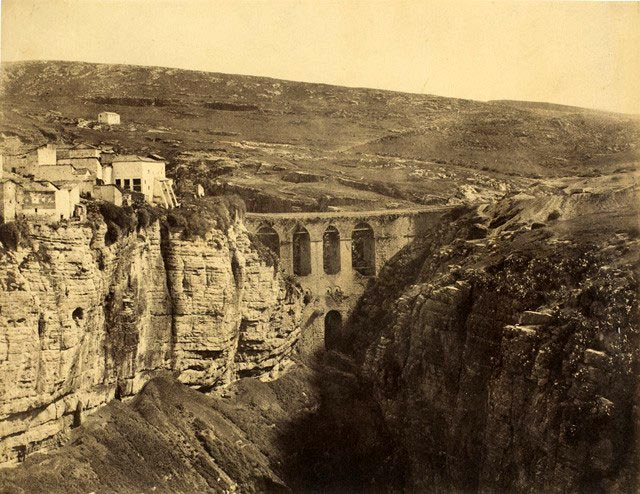
Bab El kantara Bridge 1792-1857

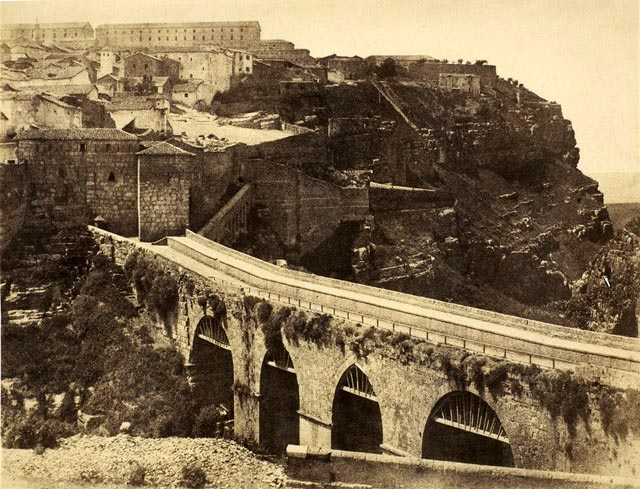
Side view of the Bridge in Ottoman era

In 1836, during the first French attack against the city, known as the Battle of Constantine, General Camille Alphonse Trézel's troops attempted to blow up the door that closed the bridge. The assault was repulsed and many soldiers were thrown into the gorges. On 18 March 1857, the bridge collapsed after the passage of an invading French infantry detachment. The aqueduct was also swept away in the landslide, cutting off the city's main source of water.

The district near the bridge is called Bab El Kantara in Arabic, meaning "the bridge door", as the bridge had indeed been closed by a gate. The elements of this gate still exist and are stored along the road to the Corniche. In 1863, after three years of construction, a new iron arch bridge was completed, and it was subsequently remodelled at the beginning of the 20th century. In 1951, following the partial collapse of the cast iron cladding of the metal arch, the municipality undertook major works to widen both the walkways and the roadway. In 1952, the current concrete arch bridge was inaugurated. It ends at a monumental gate with two stone arches that had formerly defended the entrance to the city, though their narrow width had considerably hampered traffic.

== See also ==
- List of longest suspension bridge spans
- List of bridges by length
- List of highest bridges in the world
- List of tallest bridges in the world
- Salah Bey Viaduct
- Sidi Rached Viaduct
- Sidi M'Cid Bridge
- Mellah Slimane Bridge
