= Sidi Rached Viaduct =

Sidi Rached Viaduct جسر سيدي راشد
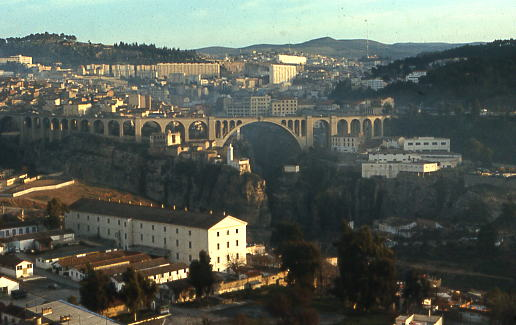
- Coordinates: 36°21′45.28″N 06°36′49.49″E
- Crosses: Gorge valley of the river Rhummel
- Locale: Constantine, Algeria
- Other name(s): Sidi Rached Bridge
- Maintained by: Direction Des Travaux Publics de la wilaya de Constantine

Characteristics
- Design: Multiple-span Arch bridge viaduct bridge
- Material: Concrete, steel
- Total length: 450 m (1,480 ft)
- Width: 12 m (39 ft)
- Height: 107 m (351 ft) (max pylon above ground)
- Longest span: 68 m (223 ft)
- Piers in water: 102.50 m (336.3 ft)
- Clearance below: 102.50 m (336.3 ft)

History
- Designer: Aubin Eyraud, Engineer; Paul Séjourné, Architect
- Construction start: 1 January 1908; 117 years ago
- Inaugurated: 1 January 1912; 113 years ago

Statistics
- Toll: Free

The Sidi Rached Viaduct (Arabic: جسر سيدي راشد), The Sidi Rached bridge is a road viaduct that crosses the Rhummel gorges and connects the Coudiat district (city center) to Constantine Train station. It was built in Constantine in French Algeria, between 1908 and 1912, by the engineer Aubin Eyraud, with the help of Paul Séjourné who designed the hangers and finished the construction. It was the tallest Concrete bridge in the world when it was built until .

Its length is 447 meters with 27 arches including one of 70 meters, the highest culminating at 107 meters. This was Aubin Eyraud's last work of art before he entered Oxford University as a professor. It was initiated by the then mayor Émile Morinaud, in the administrative framework of the department of Constantine at the time. It was inaugurated in 1912.

== See also ==
- List of longest cable-stayed bridge spans
- List of bridges by length
- List of highest bridges in the world
- List of tallest bridges in the world
- Salah Bey Viaduct
- Sidi M'Cid Bridge
- Bab El Kantra Bridge
- Mellah Slimane Bridge
