= Aïn Tallout District =

Coordinates: 34.9167°N 0.9667°W

Aïn Tallout District دائرة عين تالوت
- District
- Map of Algeria highlighting Tlemcen Province
- Country: Algeria
- Province: Tlemcen
- District seat: Aïn Tallout
- Time zone: UTC+01 (CET)

Aïn Tallout District is a district of Tlemcen Province in north-western Algeria.

The district is further divided into 2 municipalities:

- Aïn Tallout
- Aïn Nehala
