= Salah Bey Viaduct =

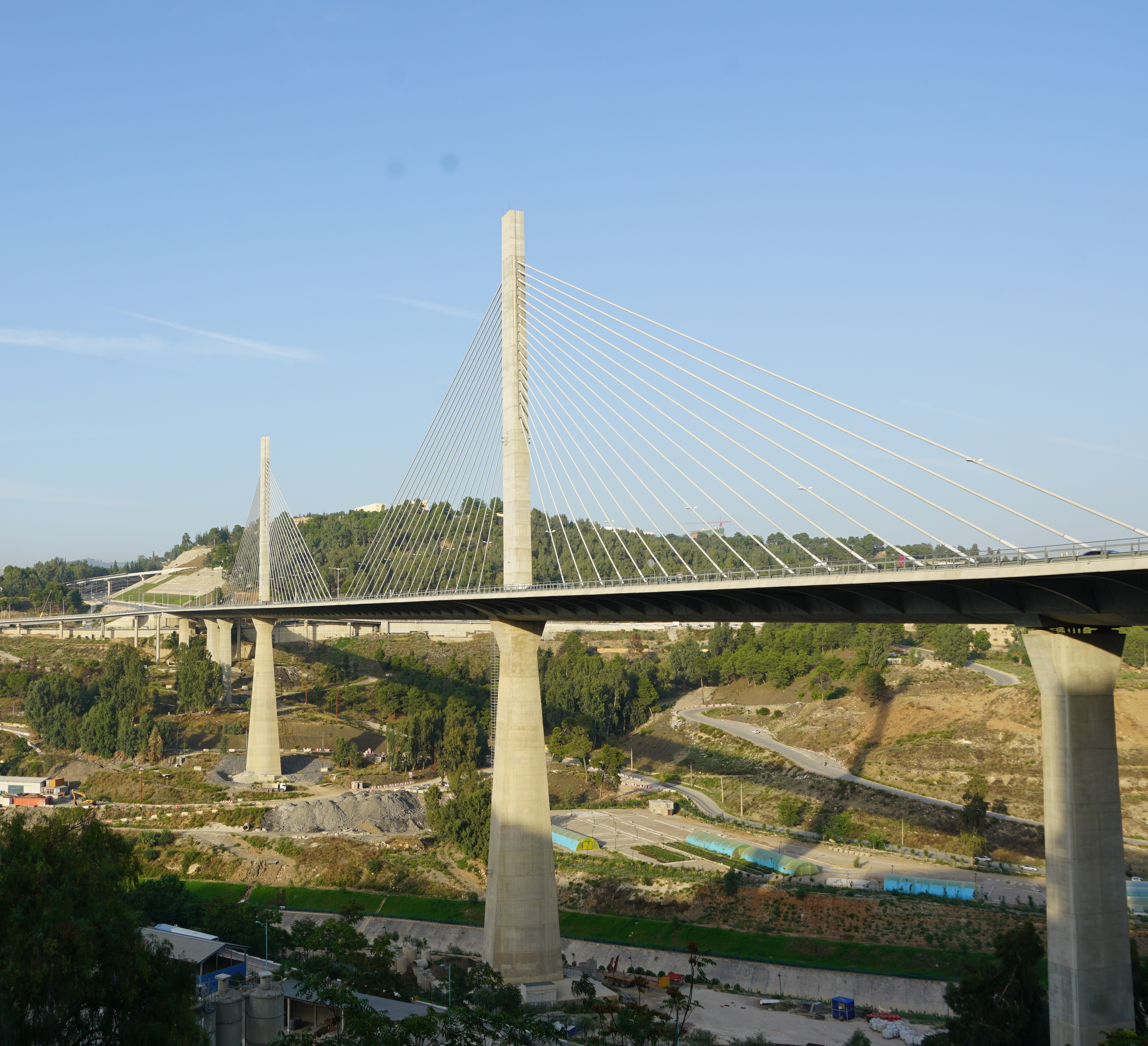
- Coordinates: 36°21′26″N 06°36′51″E
- Crosses: Gorge valley of the Rhumel River
- Locale: Constantine, Algeria
- Official name: جسر صالح باي
- Other name(s): Viaduc Salah Bey
- Maintained by: Direction Des Travaux Publics de la wilaya de Constantine

Characteristics
- Design: Multiple-span cable-stayed viaduct bridge
- Material: Concrete, steel
- Total length: 1,119 m (3,671 ft)
- Width: 27.34 m (89.7 ft)
- Height: 130 m (430 ft) (max pylon above ground)
- Longest span: 245 m (804 ft)
- No. of spans: 204 m (669 ft)
- Piers in water: 80 m (260 ft)
- Clearance below: 270 m (890 ft)
- Design life: 120 years

History
- Designer: COWI A/S, Engineering; Dissing+Weitling, Architect and Design/Build consultant
- Constructed by: Andrade Gutierrez
- Construction start: 15 September 2010; 14 years ago
- Opened: 26 July 2014 @ 09:00 hrs
- Inaugurated: 16 April 2014; 10 years ago

Statistics
- Toll: Free

The Salah Bey Viaduct (Arabic: جسر صالح باي), is a cable-stayed bridge that spans the gorge valley of the Rhumel River in Constantine, North East Algeria is named after Salah Bey whose rule of the city (1771-1792) was marked by major urban works, This viaduct is already considered the "eighth wonder" of the city with seven bridges. With a length of 1119m, the viaduct has a futuristic design, which modernized the urban configuration of the city.

== Characteristics ==
The Salah Bey Viaduct is the eighth bridge in Constantine, the longest with 756 meters for the main viaduct and 4.3 kilometers, counting the connections and accesses. Resting on eight shrouds and culminating at 130 meters.

== Connections ==
The viaduct is connected to the East–West Highway from three sides, from the south via the N5, from the east via the N3, and from the north via the Djebel El Ouahch area, where road widening works were undertaken and a tunnel was built to facilitate access.

== Inauguration ==
The Salah Bey Viaduct was inaugurated on July 26, 2014, by Prime Minister Abdelmalek Sellal, named after the governor of Constantine Salah Bey from 1771 to 1792.

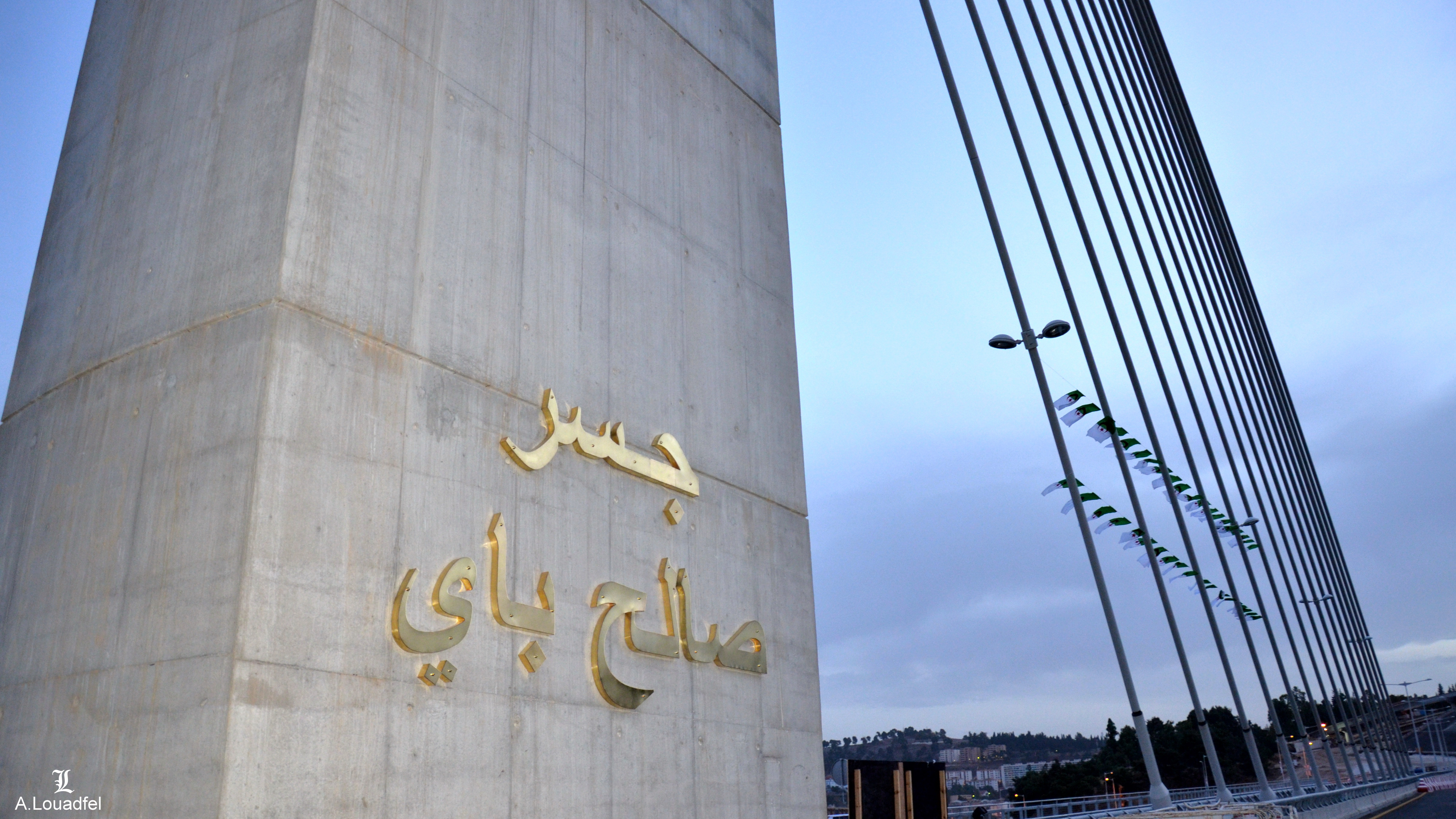
Inauguration Plaque

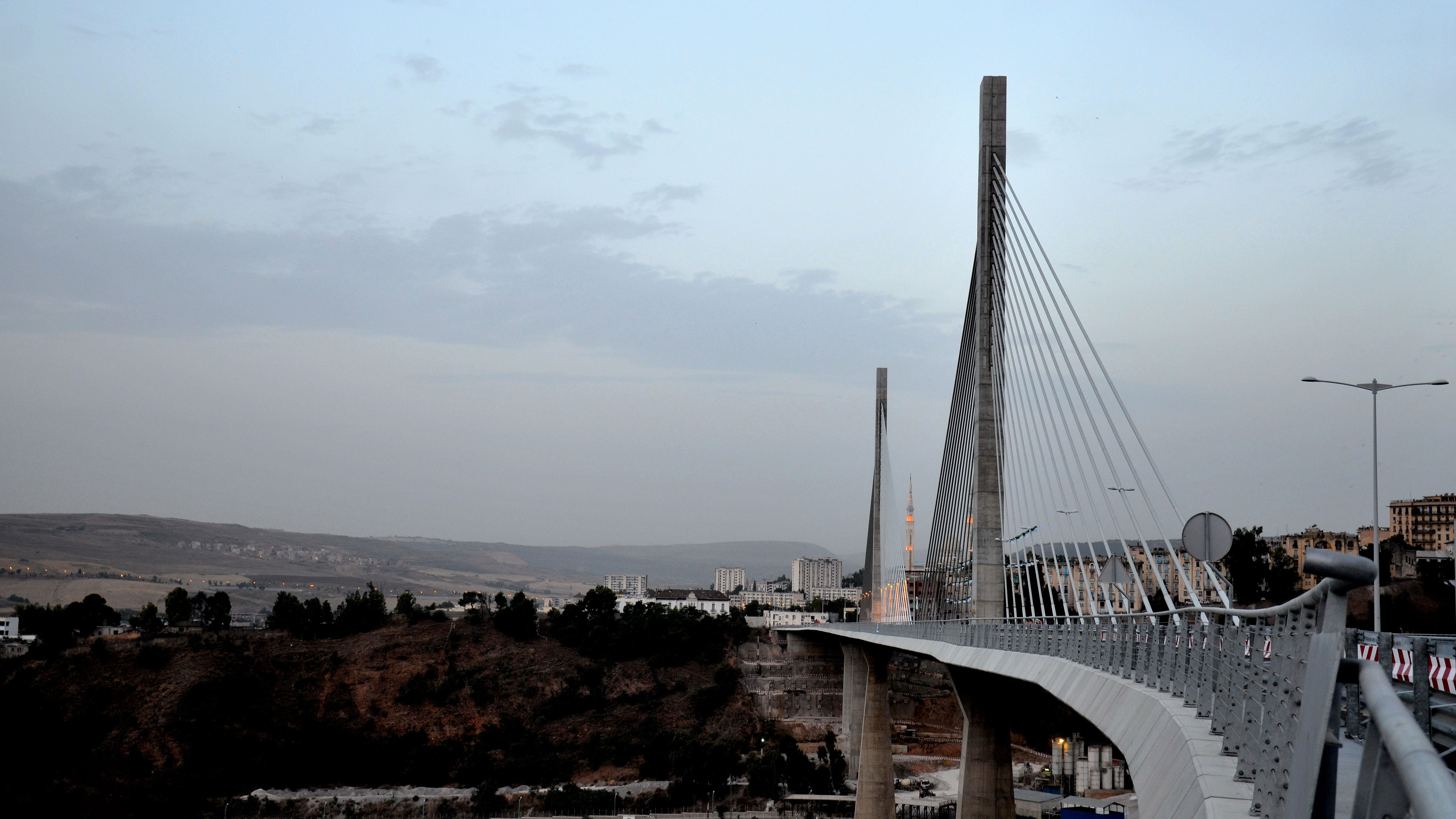
Side view of the Viaduct

== See also ==
- List of longest cable-stayed bridge spans
- List of bridges by length
- List of highest bridges in the world
- List of tallest bridges in the world
- Pont de Normandie
- Baluarte Bridge
- Sidi Rached Viaduct
- Bab El Kantra Bridge
- Sidi M'Cid Bridge
- Mellah Slimane Bridge
