= Salah Bey Mosque =

Mosque in Annaba, Algeria

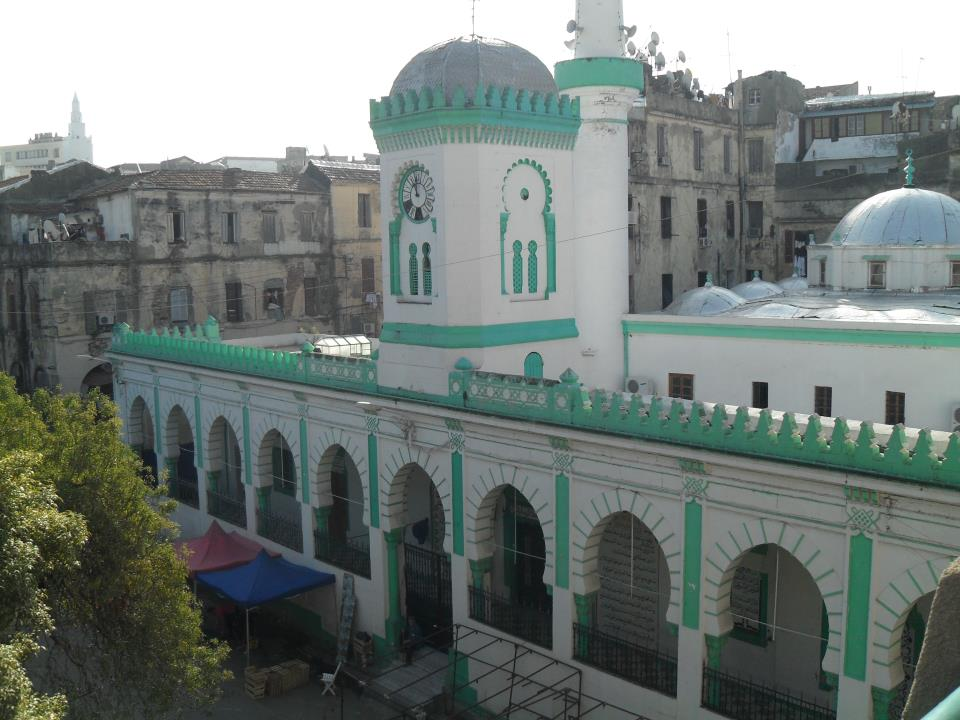

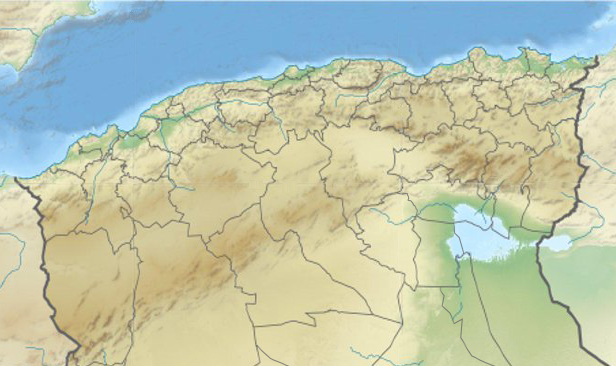
- Location of the mosque in northern Algeria

Religion
- Affiliation: Sunni Islam
- Ecclesiastical or organisational status: Mosque
- Status: Active

Location
- Location: Annaba, Annaba Province
- Country: Algeria
- Interactive map of Salah Bey Mosque
- Coordinates: 36°53′56″N 7°45′37″E

Architecture
- Type: Islamic architecture
- Founder: Salah Bey ben Mostefa
- Completed: 1792

Specifications
- Dome: 2 (maybe more)
- Minaret: 2

The Salah Bey Mosque is a Sunni mosque in Annaba, Algeria.

The mosque was built between 1791 and 1792, during the Ottoman era, by Salah Bey ben Mostefa, the bey of the Beylik of Constantine in the Deylik of Algiers from 1771 to 1792.

== See also ==
- Islam in Algeria
- List of mosques in Algeria
