= Sidi M'Cid Bridge =

Sidi M'Cid Bridge جسر سيدي مسيد
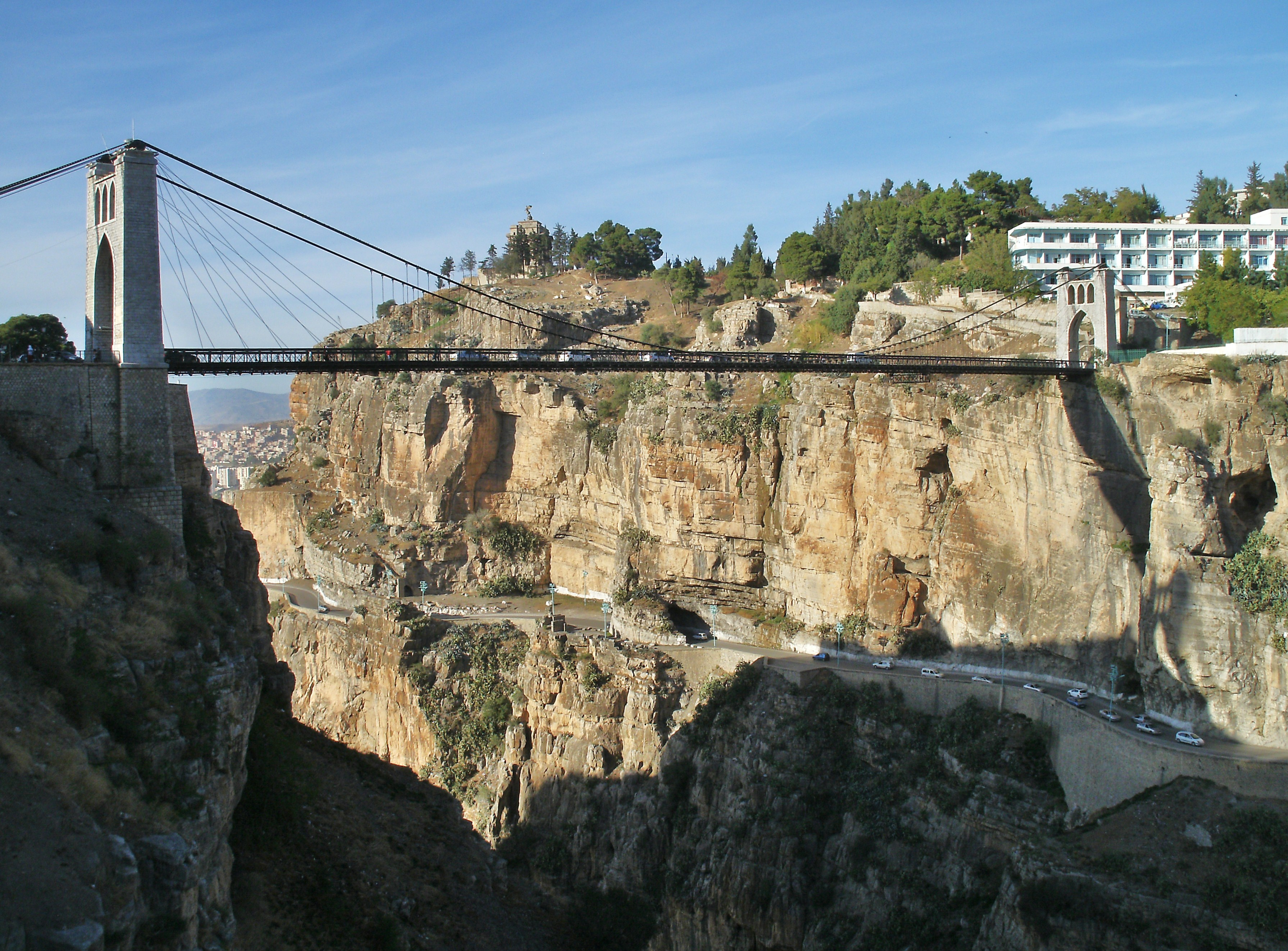
- Coordinates: 36°22′20.8″N 6°36′51.2″E
- Carries: Motor vehicles, Pedestrians
- Crosses: Gorge valley of the Rhumel River
- Locale: Constantine, Algeria
- Other name(s): قنطرة الحبال (The cables Bridge)

Characteristics
- No. of spans: 160 m (520 ft)
- Clearance below: 175 m (574 ft)

History
- Designer: Ferdinand Arnodin
- Construction start: 1909
- Opened: April 19, 1912

Statistics
- Toll: Free

Location
- Interactive map of Sidi M'Cid Bridge

Sidi M'Cid Bridge is a 164-metre-long (538 ft) suspension bridge across the Rhumel River in Constantine, Algeria. It was opened to traffic in April 1912 and until 1929 was the highest bridge in the world at 175 m (574 ft). The bridge was designed by French engineer Ferdinand Arnodin and links the Casbah to Sidi M'Cid hill. The bridge underwent restoration in 2000 when 12 of its cables were replaced by the Algerian company SAPTA.

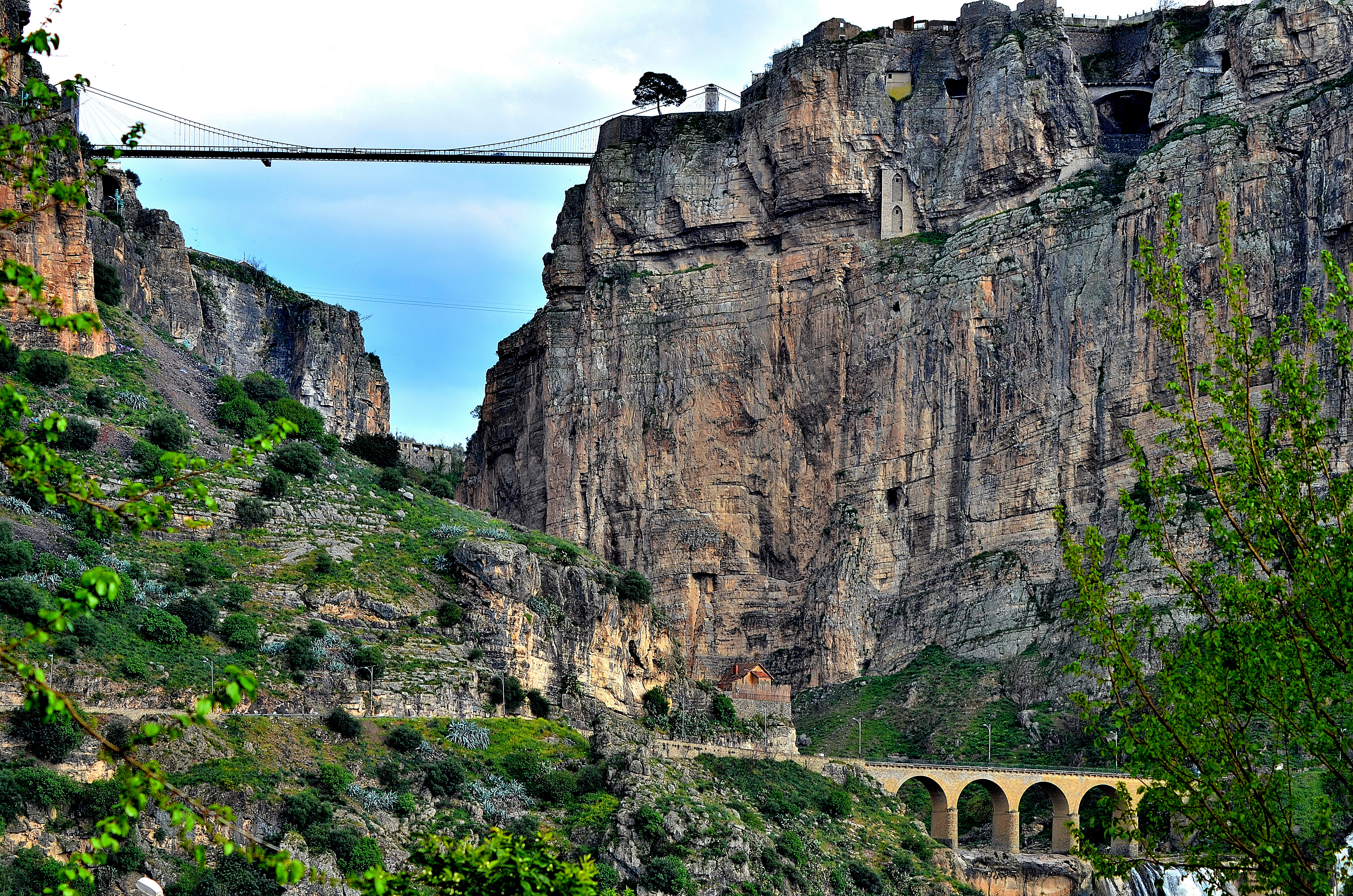
The gorge beneath the bridge

== History ==
Constantine was an important city of 50,000 people when Émile Morinaud took over as the mayor and member of parliament in 1901. During his time in power till 1934, he went about modernizing the city. The Sidi M'Cid bridge, the Sidi Rached bridge and many other prominent buildings were constructed in this period. The bridge remained the highest bridge in the world till the Royal Gorge Bridge in Colorado opened in November 1929.

The Monument of the Dead is on one side of the bridge on the Sidi M'Cid hill. The monument is a replica of the Arch of Trajan in Timgad and commemorates the people of Constantine who laid down their lives fighting for France in the First World War. There is a natural bridge below the Sidi M'Cid bridge which blocks the view of the river from the bridge.

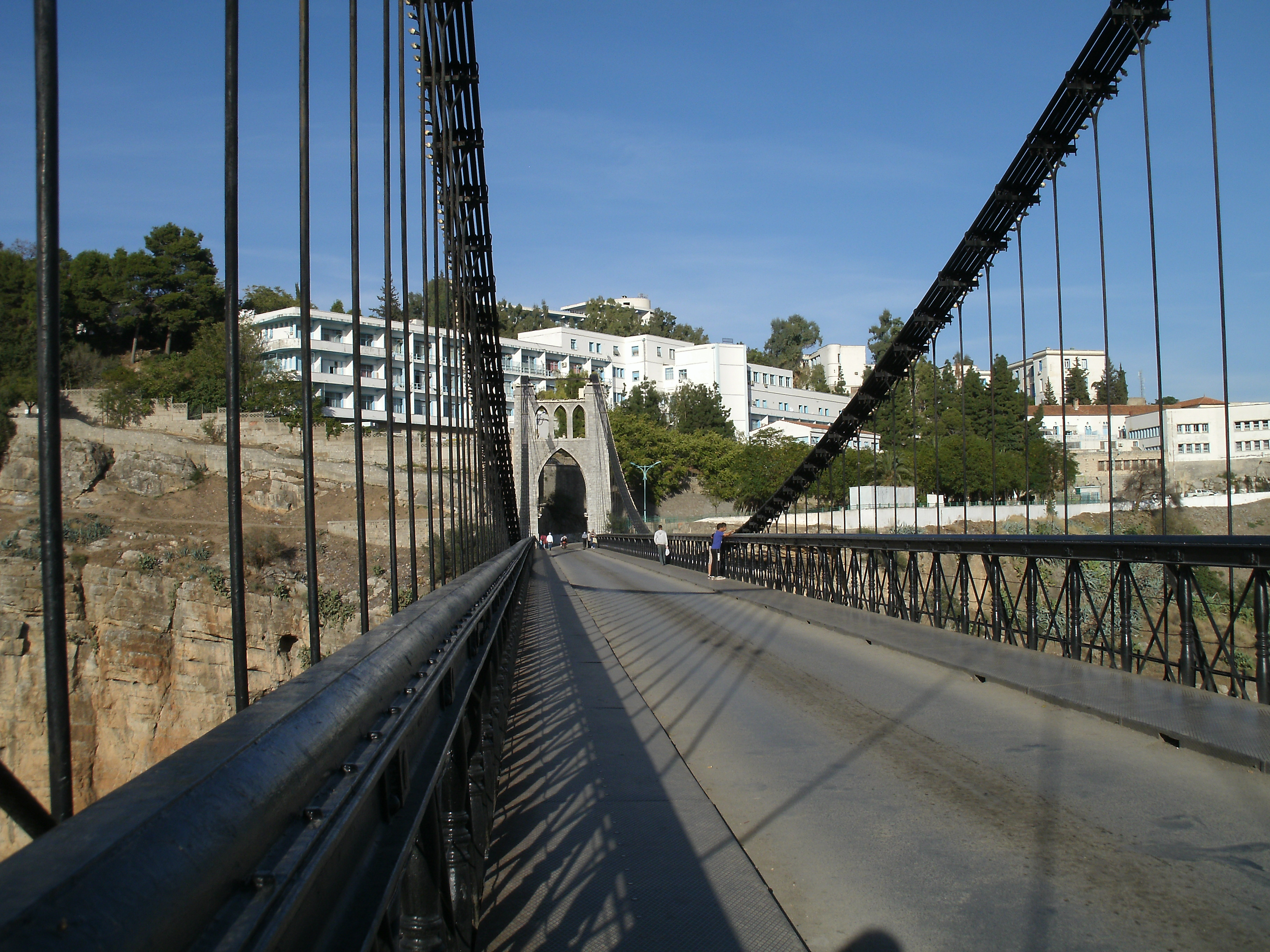
The road and the pedestrian walkway

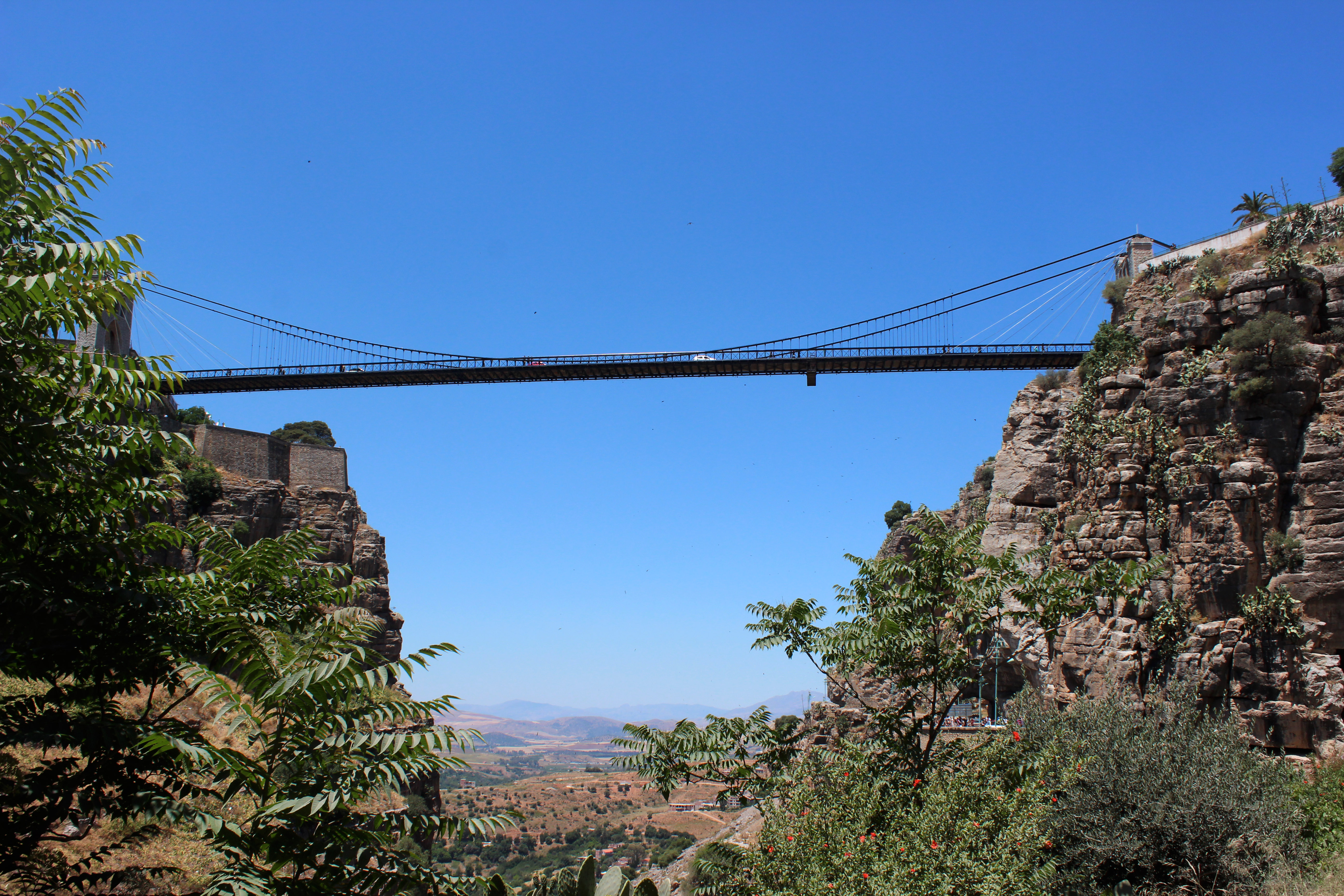
The view from beneath the bridge

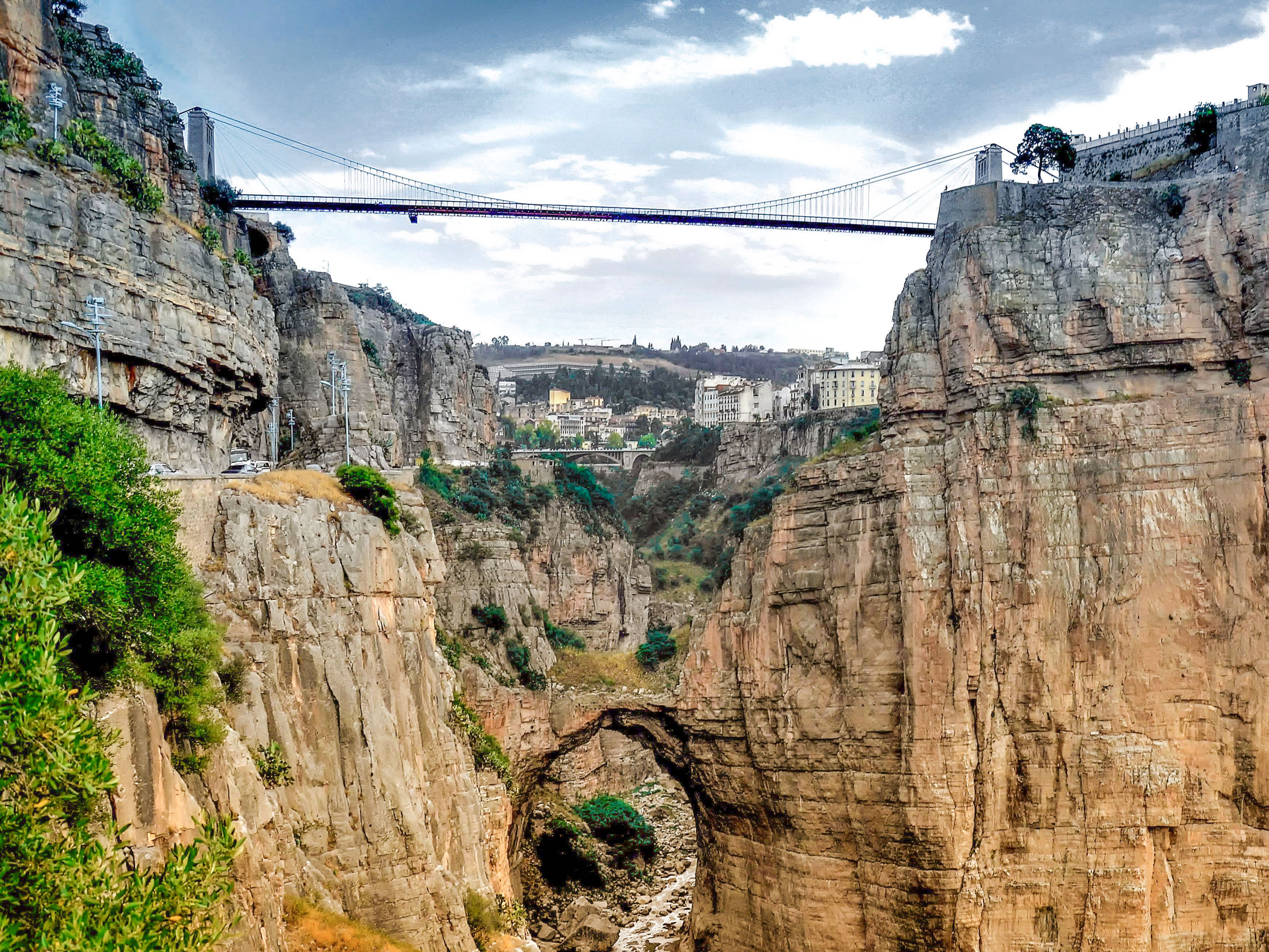
The natural bridge beneath the Sidi M'Cid

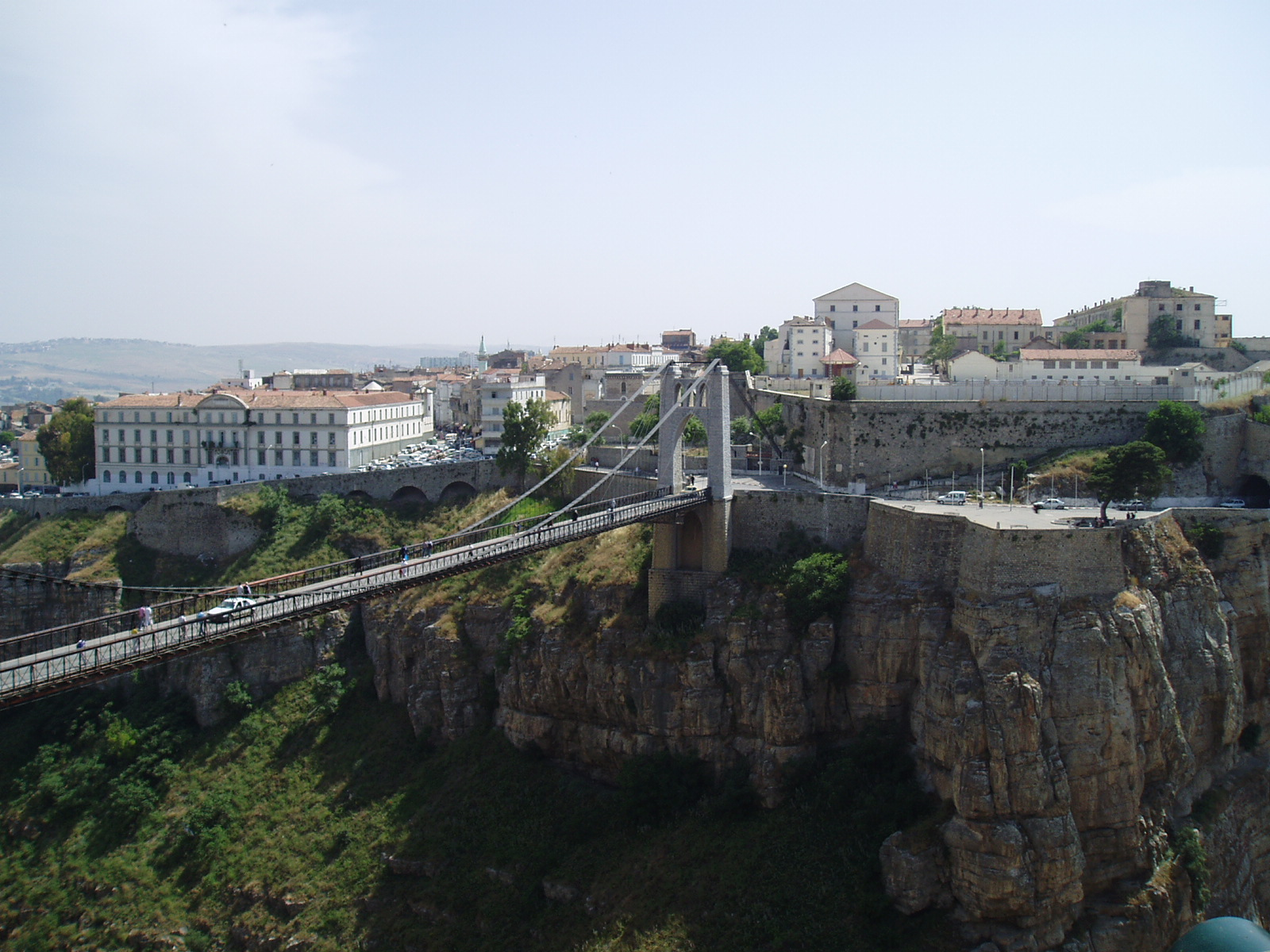
The Sidi M'Cid hill on one side of the bridge

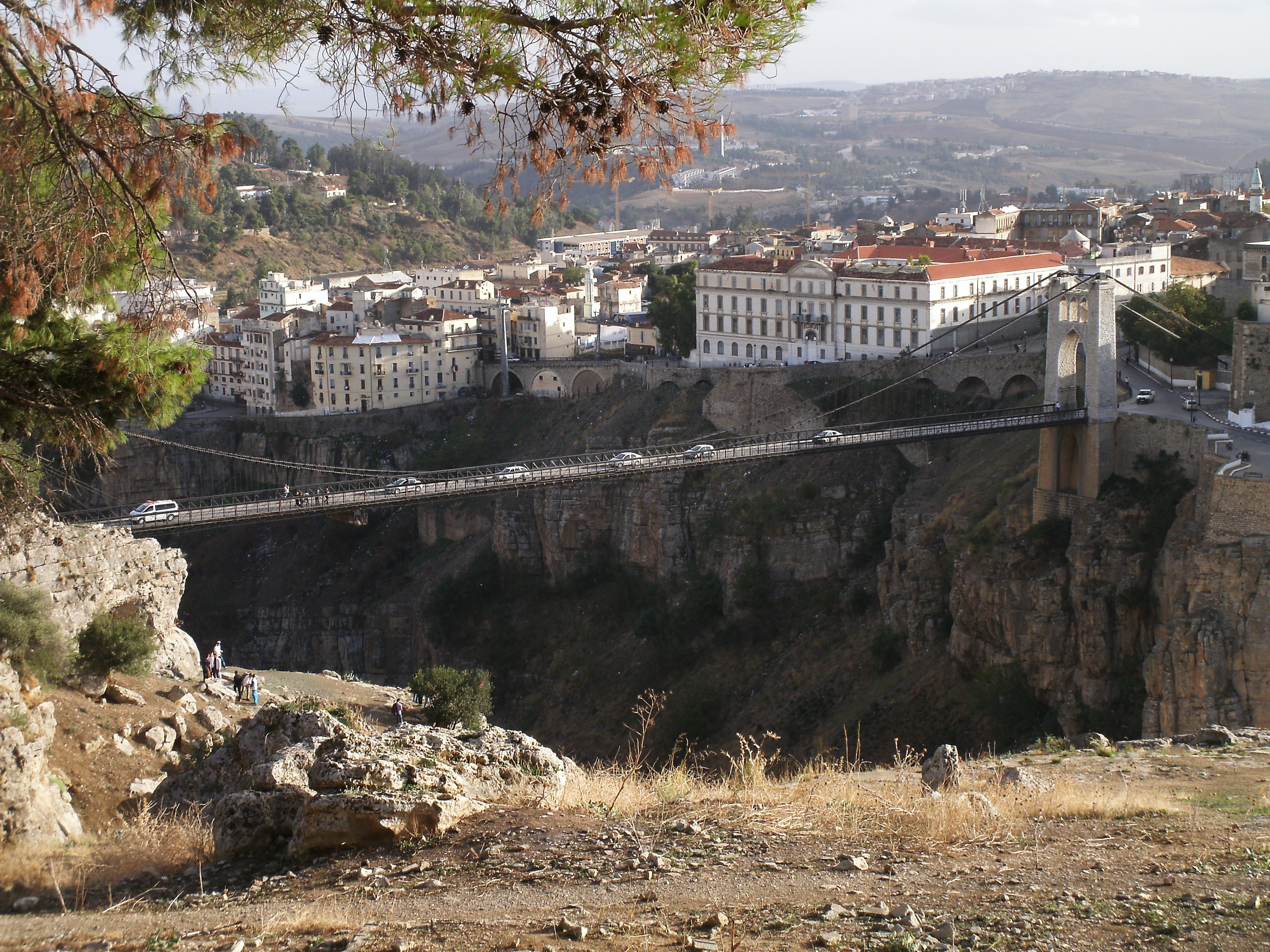
View of the Sidi M'Cid hill and the city

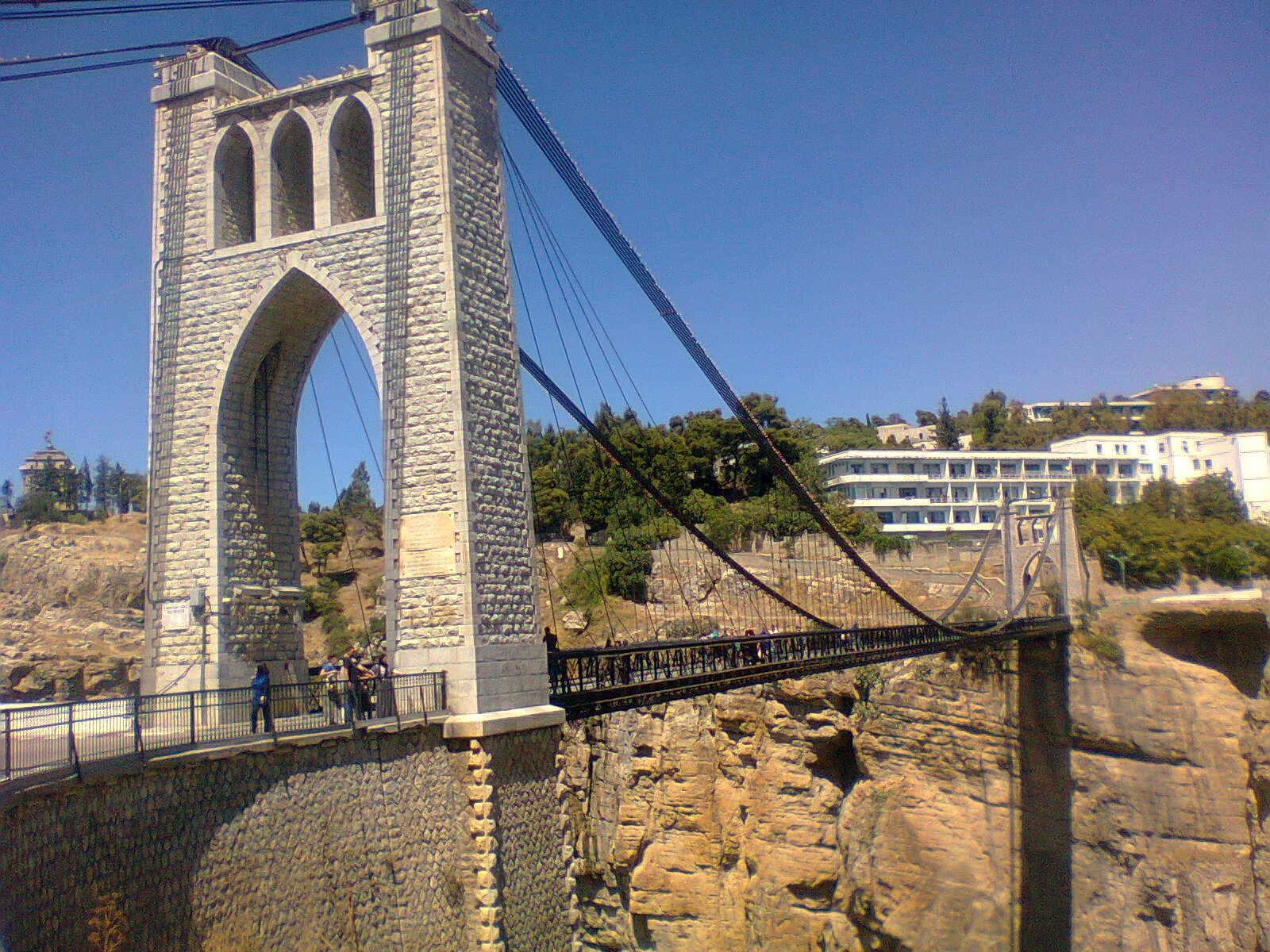
The archways on either side of the bridge

== See also ==
- List of longest suspension bridge spans
- List of bridges by length
- List of highest bridges in the world
- List of tallest bridges in the world
- Salah Bey Viaduct
- Sidi Rached Viaduct
- Bab El Kantra Bridge
