= Aïn Tallout =

Aïn Tallout عين تالوت
- Commune and town
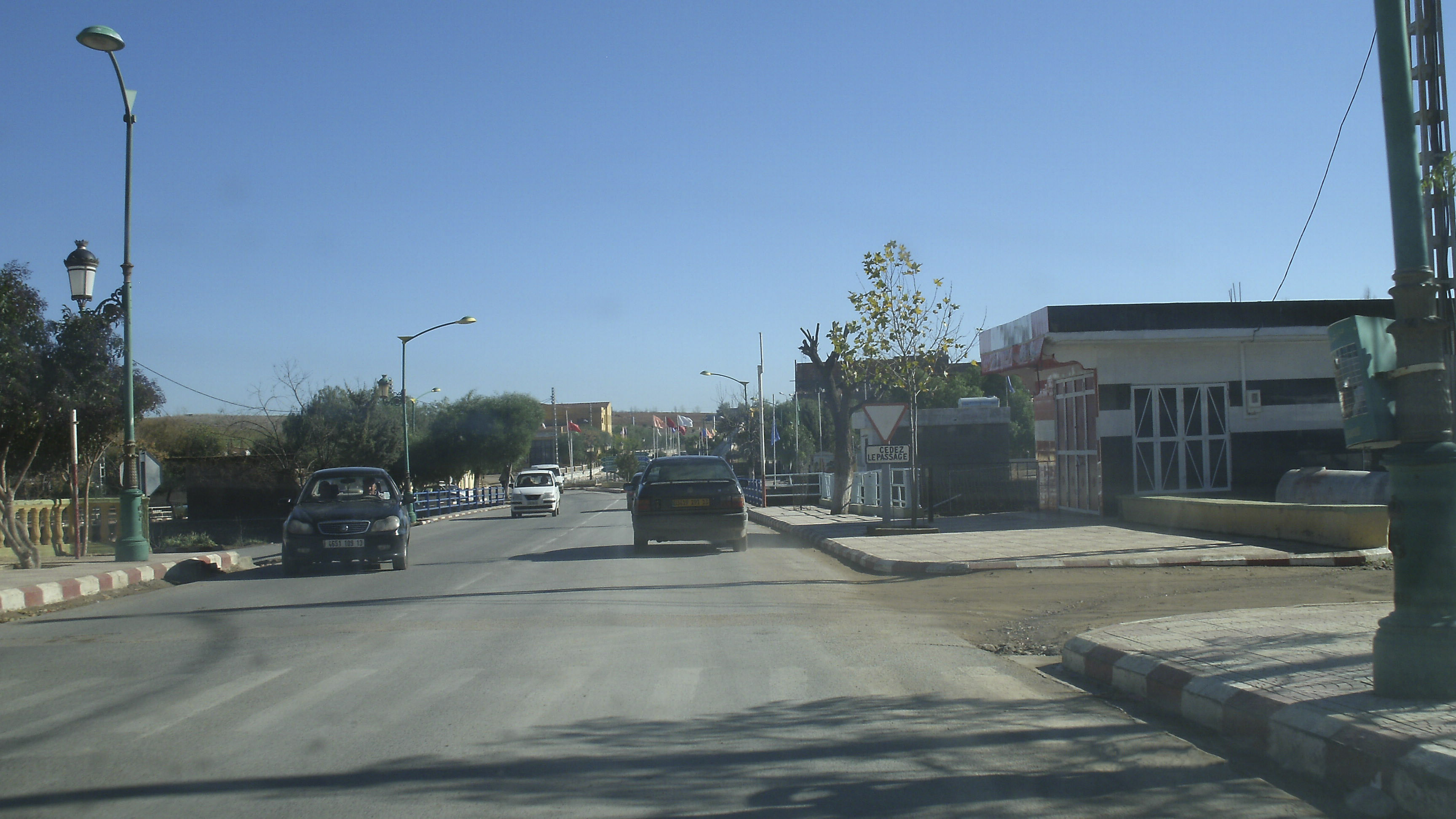
- Aïn Tallout

- Location within Algeria
- Coordinates: 34.9238889°N 0.9544444°W
- Country: Algeria
- Province: Tlemcen Province
- District: Aïn Tallout

Population (2008)
  - Total: 10,286
- Time zone: UTC+1 (CET)
- Postal Code: 13150

Aïn Tallout (Arabic: عين تالوت) is a town and commune in Tlemcen Province in northwestern Algeria.
