= Salah Bey (town) =

- Commune and town
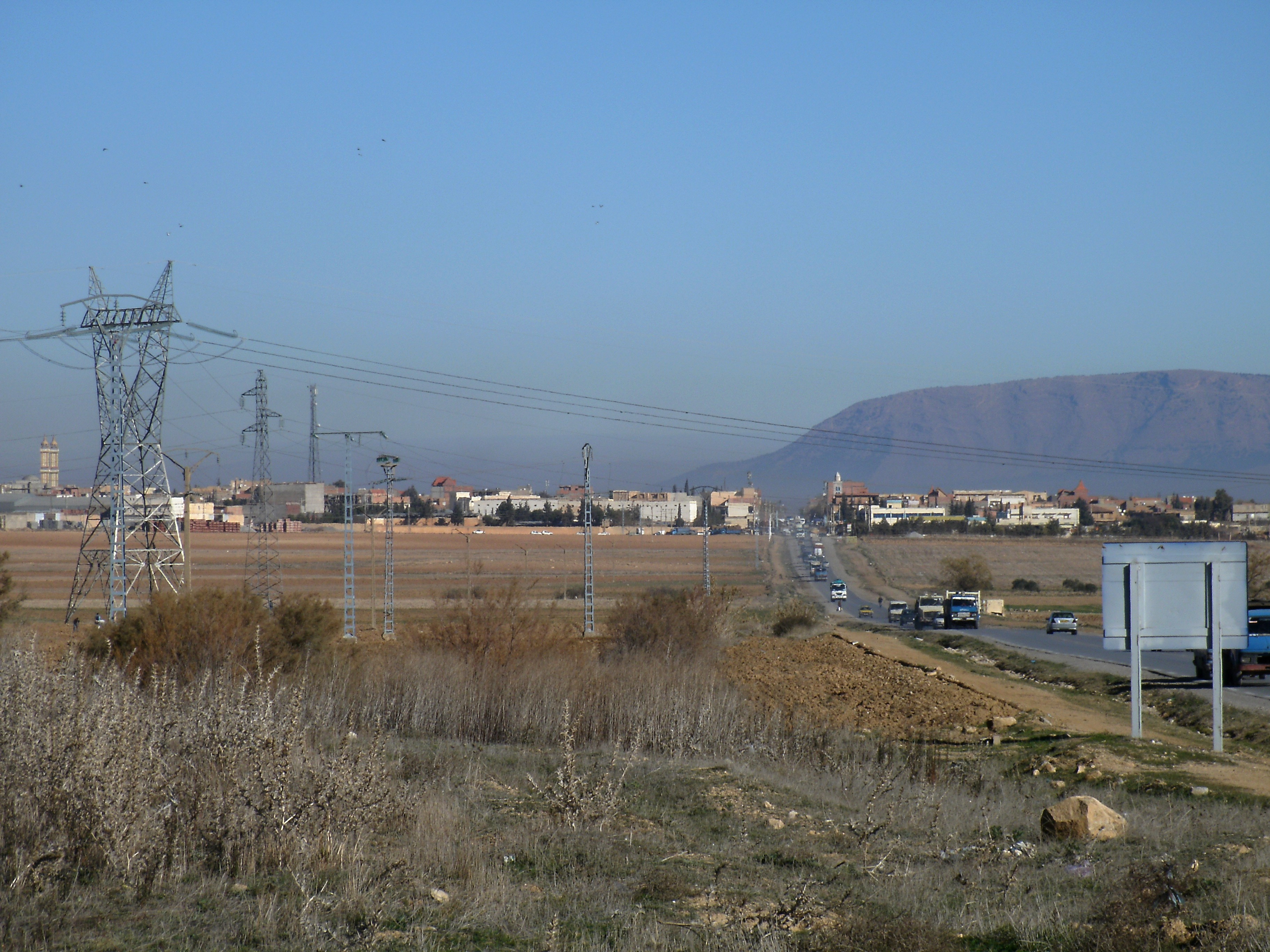

- Location within Algeria
- Coordinates: 35°51′15″N 5°17′30″E
- Country: Algeria
- Province: Sétif Province
- Time zone: UTC+1 (CET)

Salah Bey is a town and commune in Sétif Province in north-eastern Algeria. The town is named after Salah Bey, the bey of Constantine from 1771 to 1792.
