= El-Ourit Waterfalls =

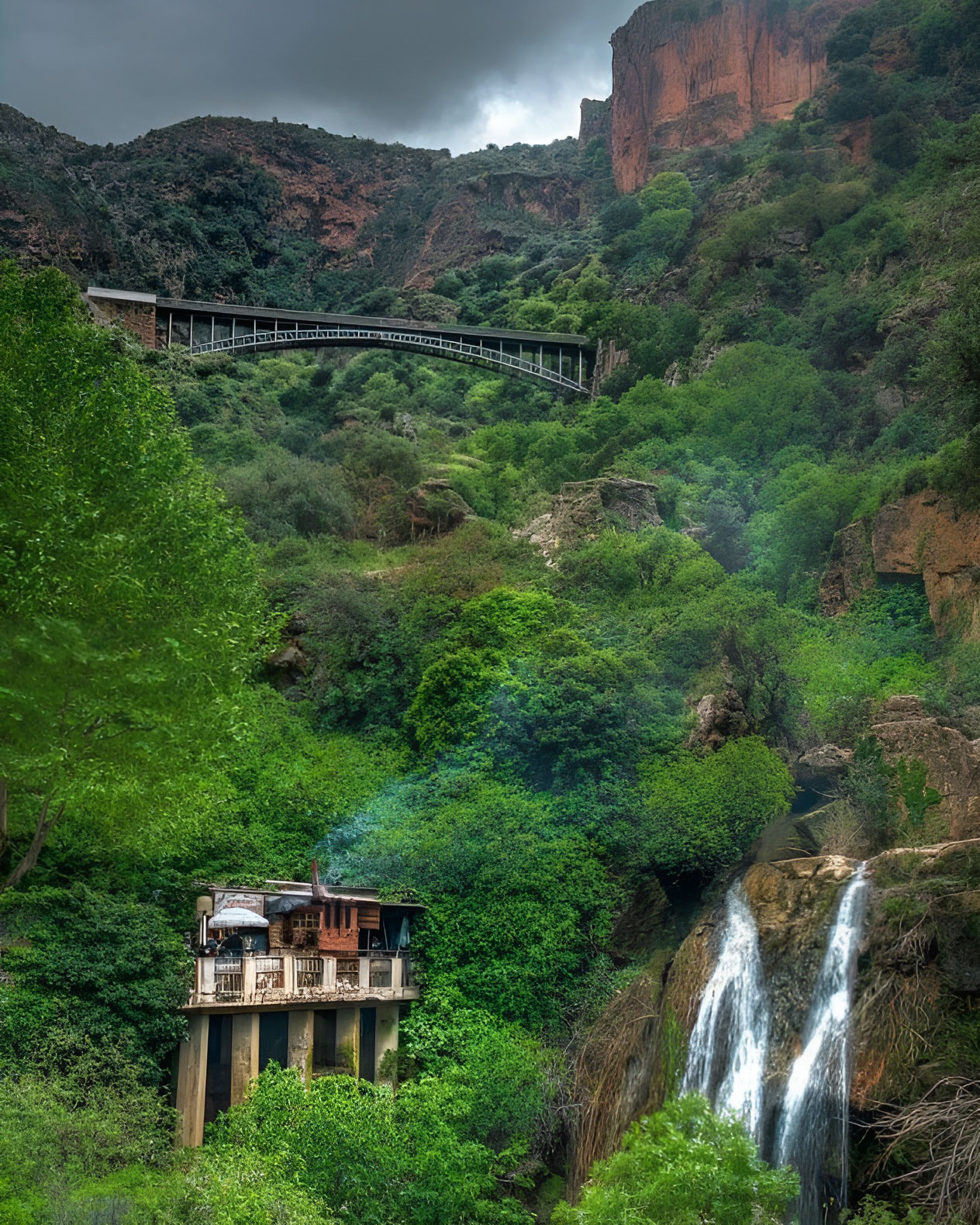
- Location: Tlemcen, Algeria

El-Ourit Waterfalls (Arabic: شلال لوريط) are located seven kilometers from the city of Tlemcen, near the National Road of Algeria in a mountainous area covered with pine trees. Seven stepped cascades form the natural site of Oued El-Ourit, which remained dry for 40 years before reappearing in 2009.
