= Rhumel River =

River in Algeria

Coordinates: 36°52′17″N 6°04′59″E

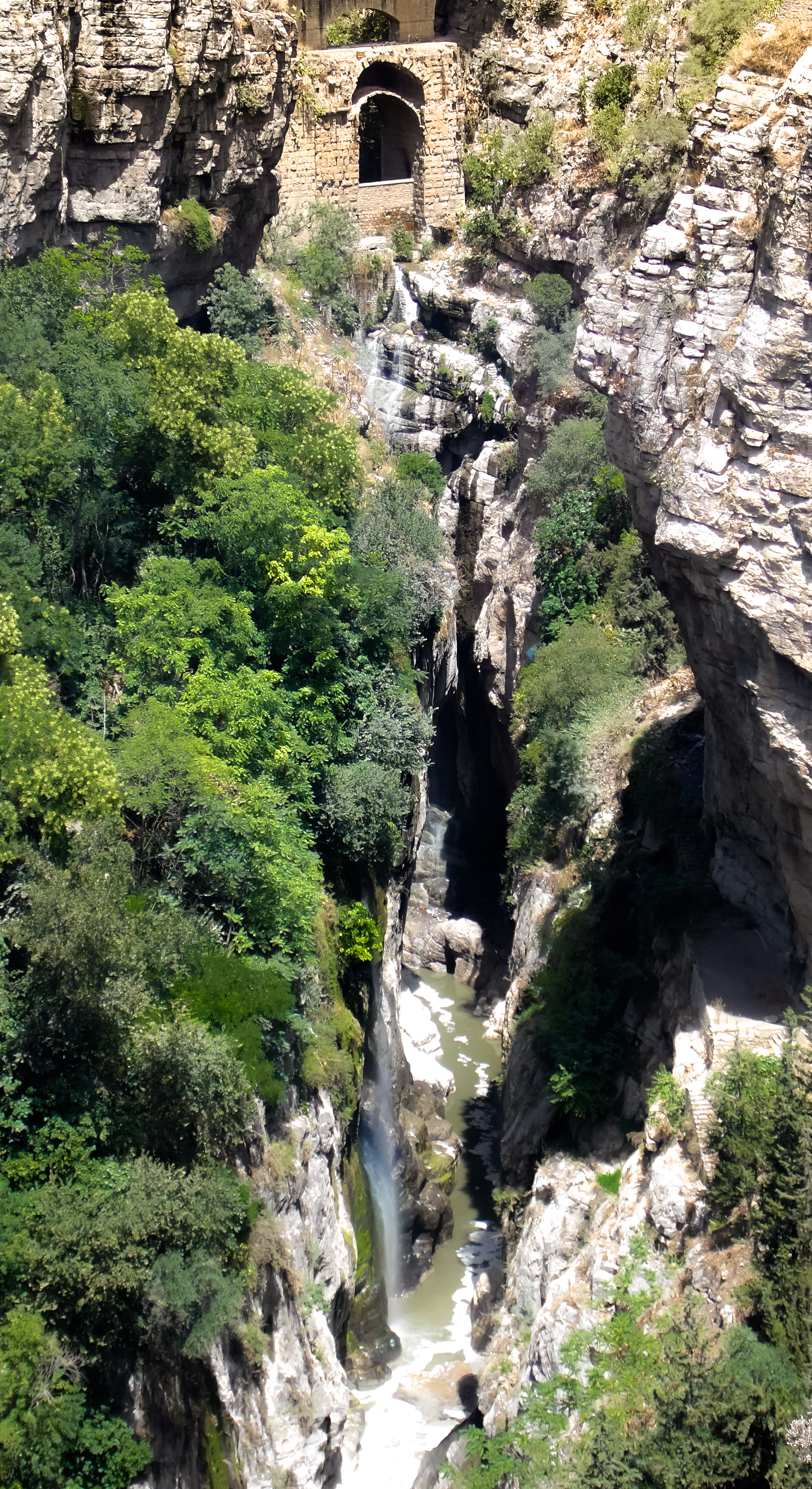
The Rhumel and the Roman bridge

The Rhumel River (Arabic: وادي الرمال), also known as the Rhummel, Rummel, El-Kebîrl, and in antiquity as the Ampsaga river, is the largest river in the Constantine province of Algeria.

== Geography ==
The source of the Rhumel river is in the Ferdjioua (Mila) mountains. From there it meanders through the Constantine plateau, then narrows considerably north of Aïn Smara where it forms an almost complete oxbow before infiltrating, in a SW/NE orientation, the Djebel El Hadjar limestone tables and the Aïn el Bey plateau.

From here, it flows into a narrow ravine near Boussouf, goes through several curves, and becomes very narrow again at a place called "the Roman arches". This leads to the entrance to the Kheneg gorges, whose huge eastern pillar, called the "Tiddis mountain", is the site of Tiddis, a significant Berber and Roman city that was explored by the archaeologist André Berthier. Not far away is the village of Messaoud Boudjriou (previously Aïn-Kerma) and its old antimony mine.

The lower Rhumel (or Oued-el-Kebir) passes through deep gorges in the Numidian mountains and empties into the sea east of the Gulf of Jijel.

== Tributaries ==
The main tributary of the Rhumel is the Oued-Boumerzoug which rises in the commune of Aïn M'lila. Its waters are widely used for irrigation, and the important spa of Ain Fesguia is located towards the head of the valley. This tributary supplies drinking water to the city of Constantine, which is highly prone to flooding being situated at the confluence of the Boumerzoug and the Rhumel.

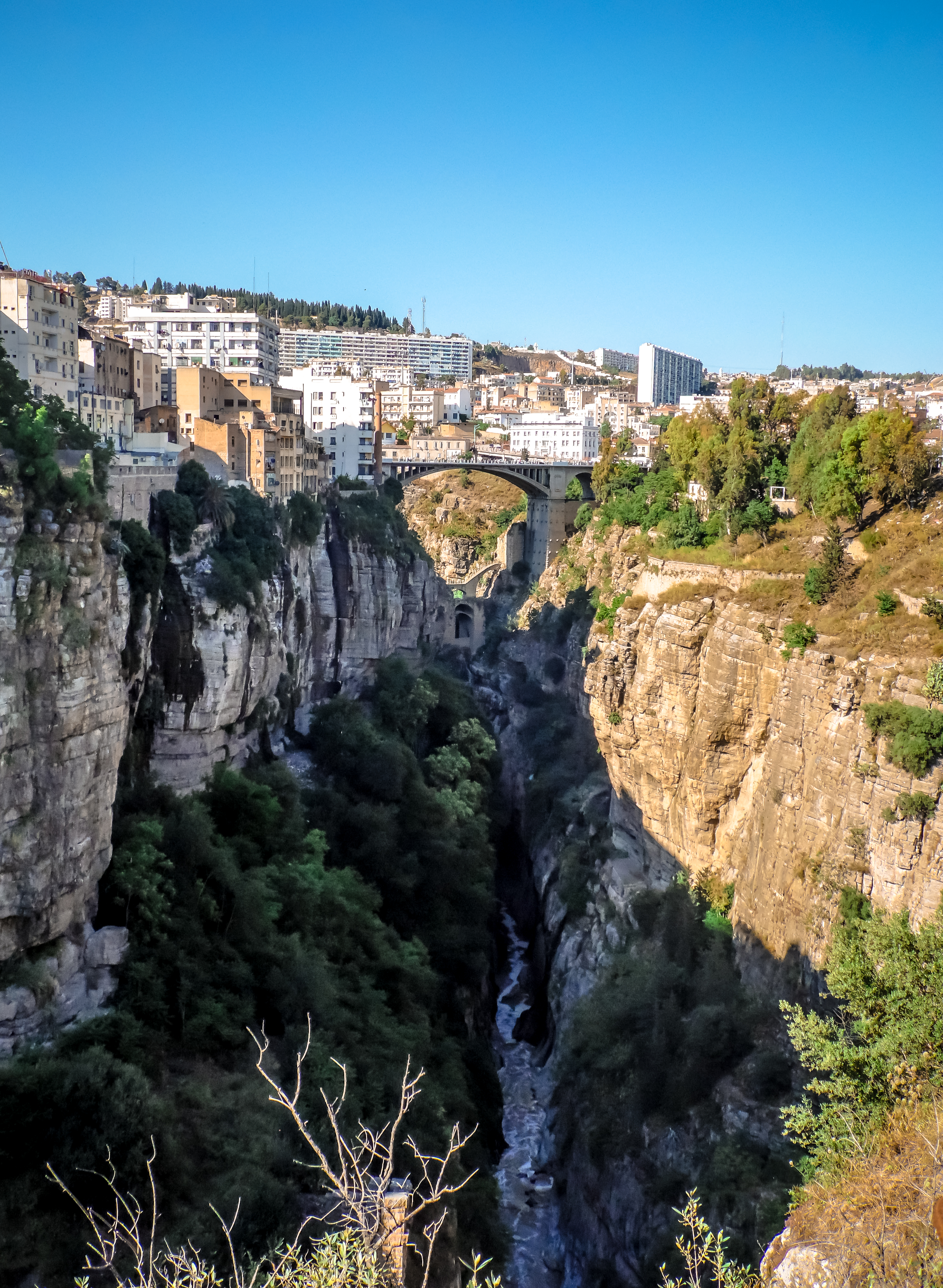
The Rhumel gorges and the El Kantara bridge

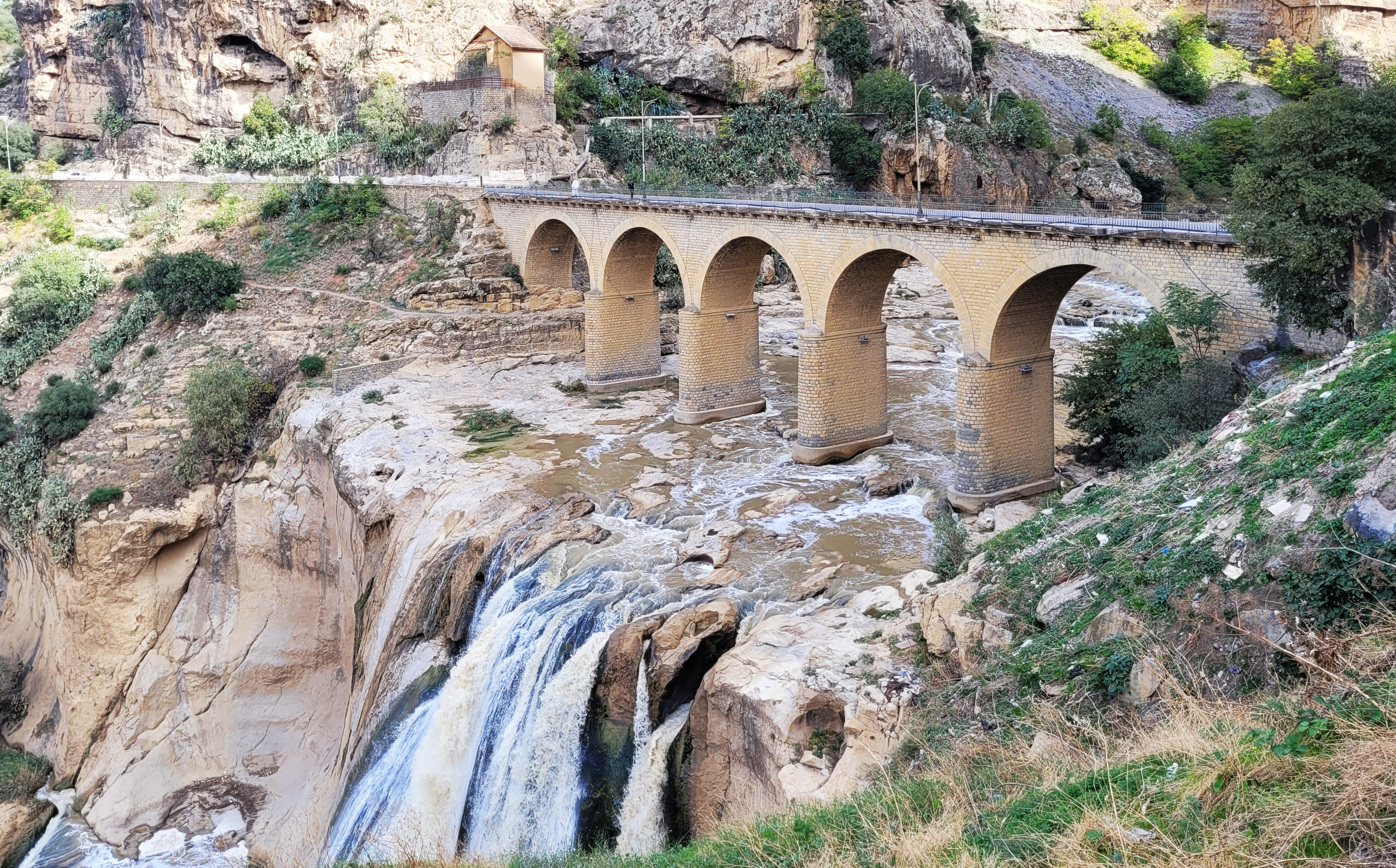
The Falls Bridge on Rhumel River

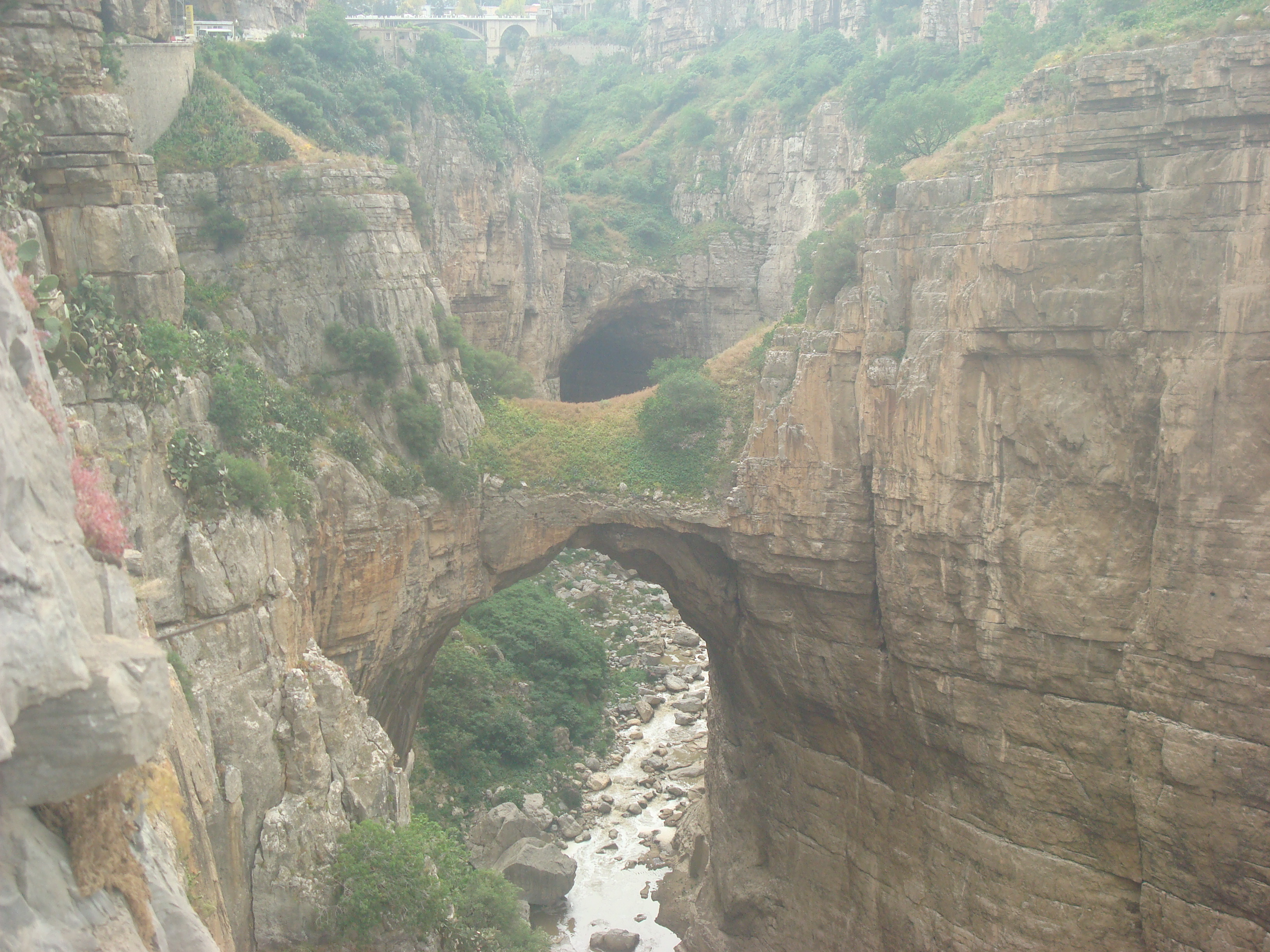
Rhumel canyon, north side

Another tributary is the Oued Dekri, near the town of Chelghoum Laïd, 50 kilometres (31 mi) southwest of Constantine.
