= Tlemcen =

Tlemcen تِلِمْسَان
- City
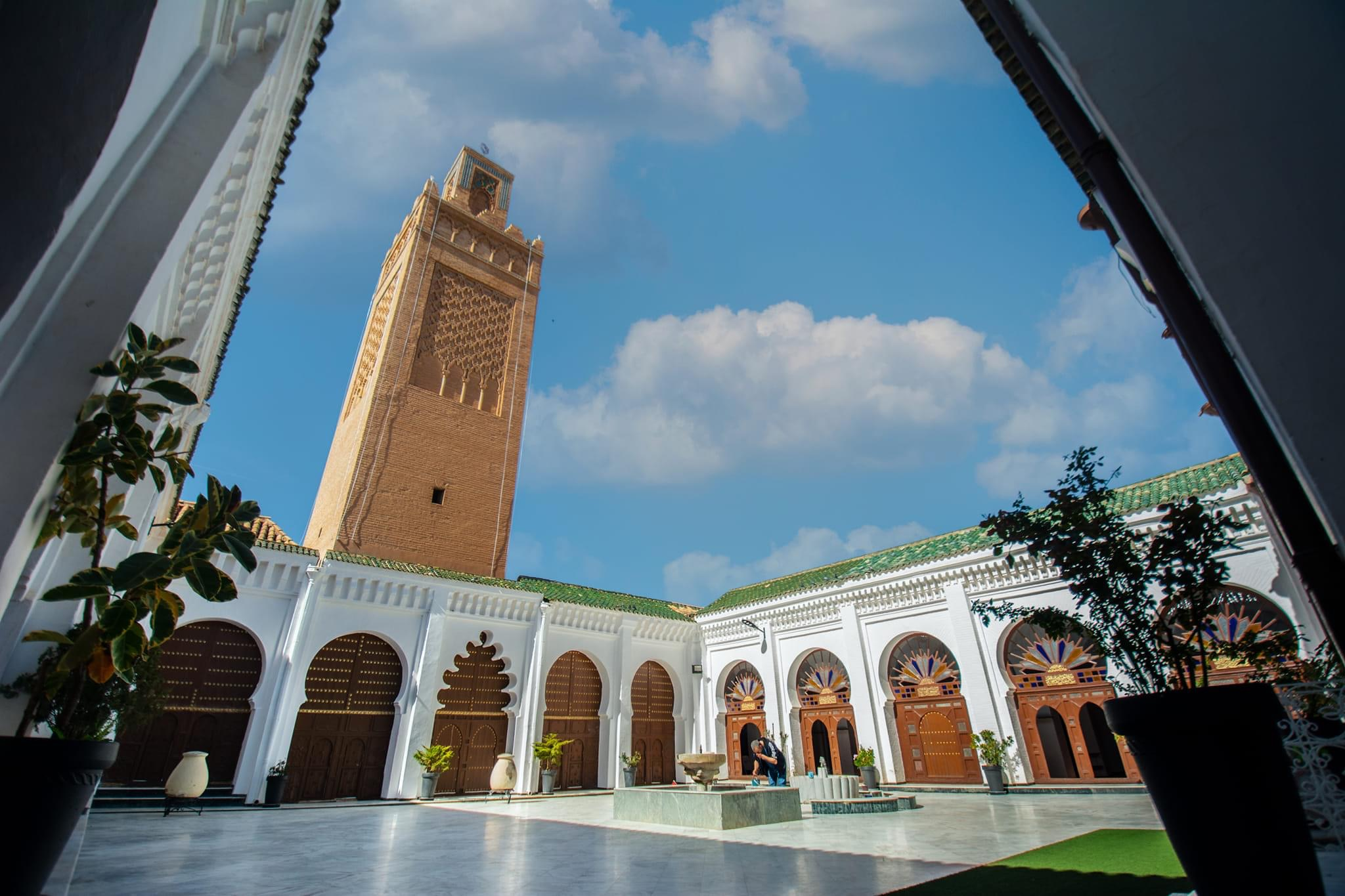
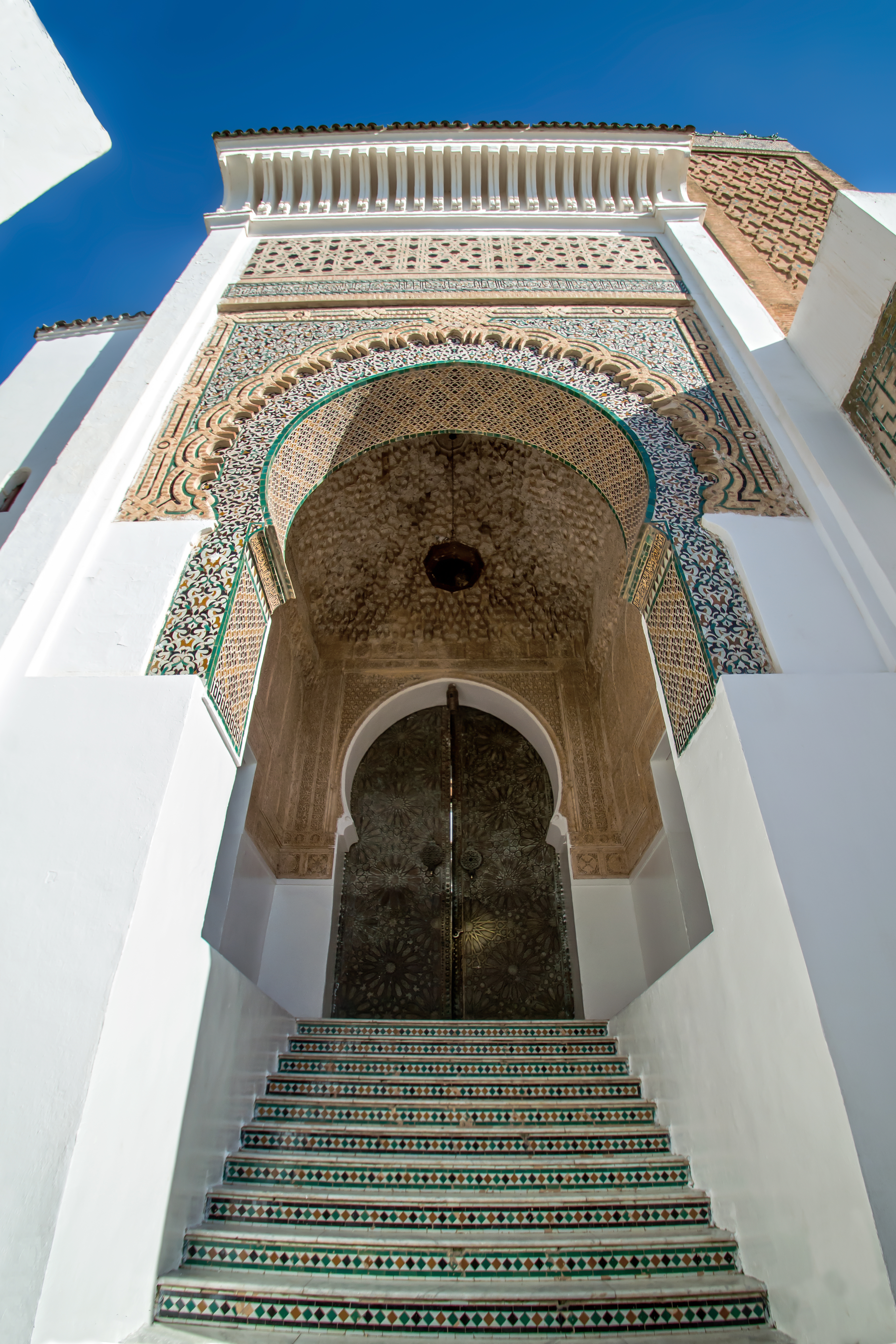
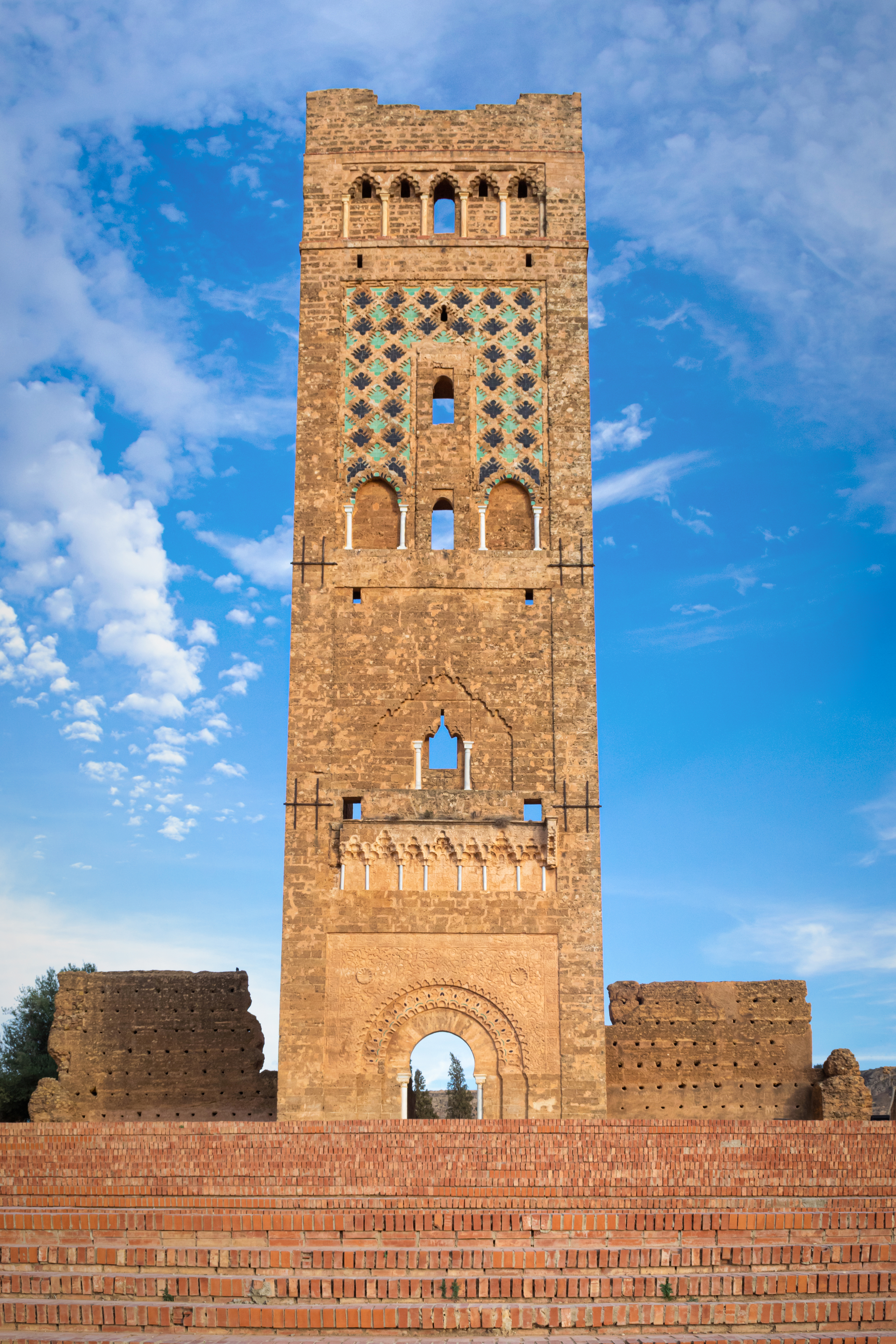
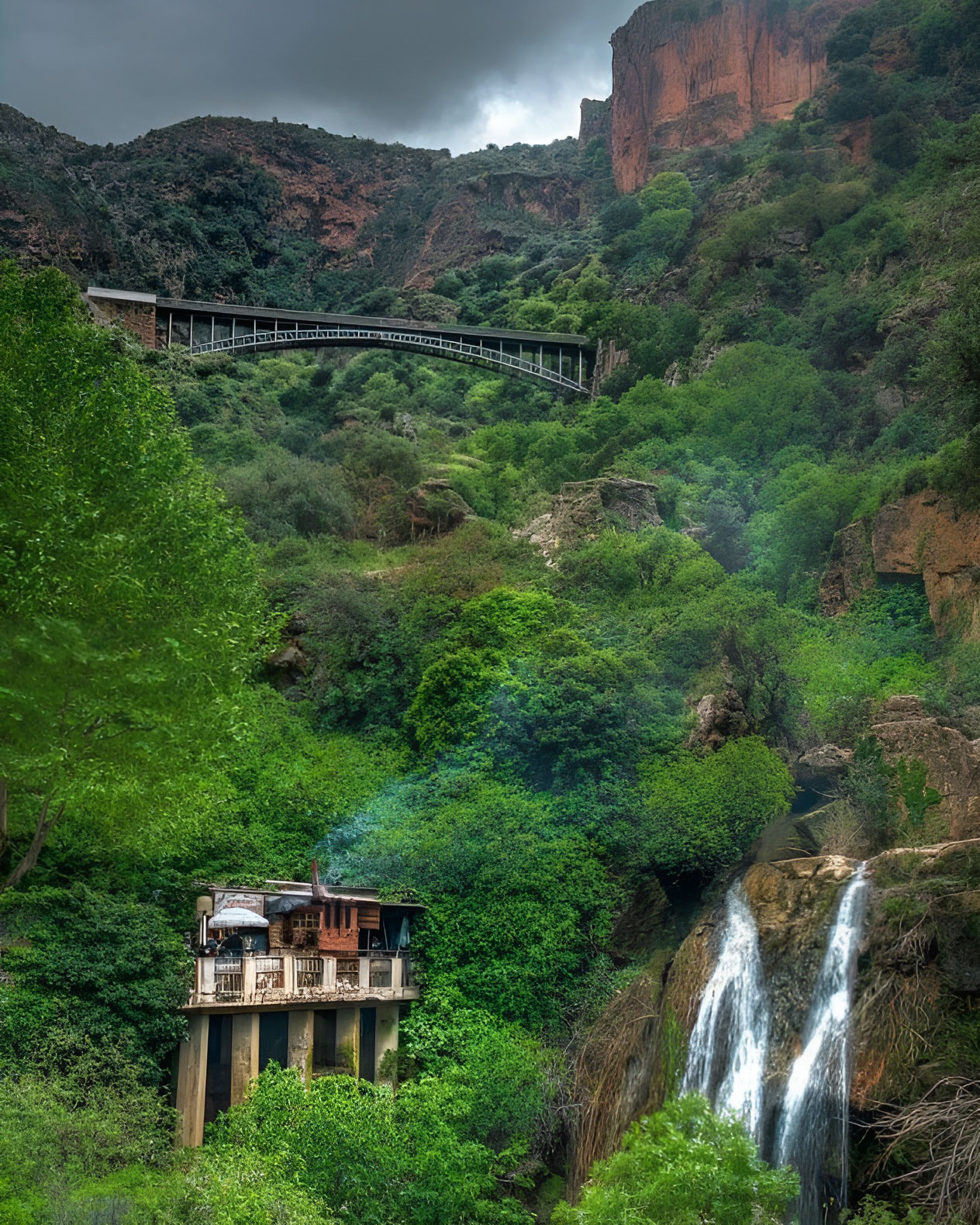
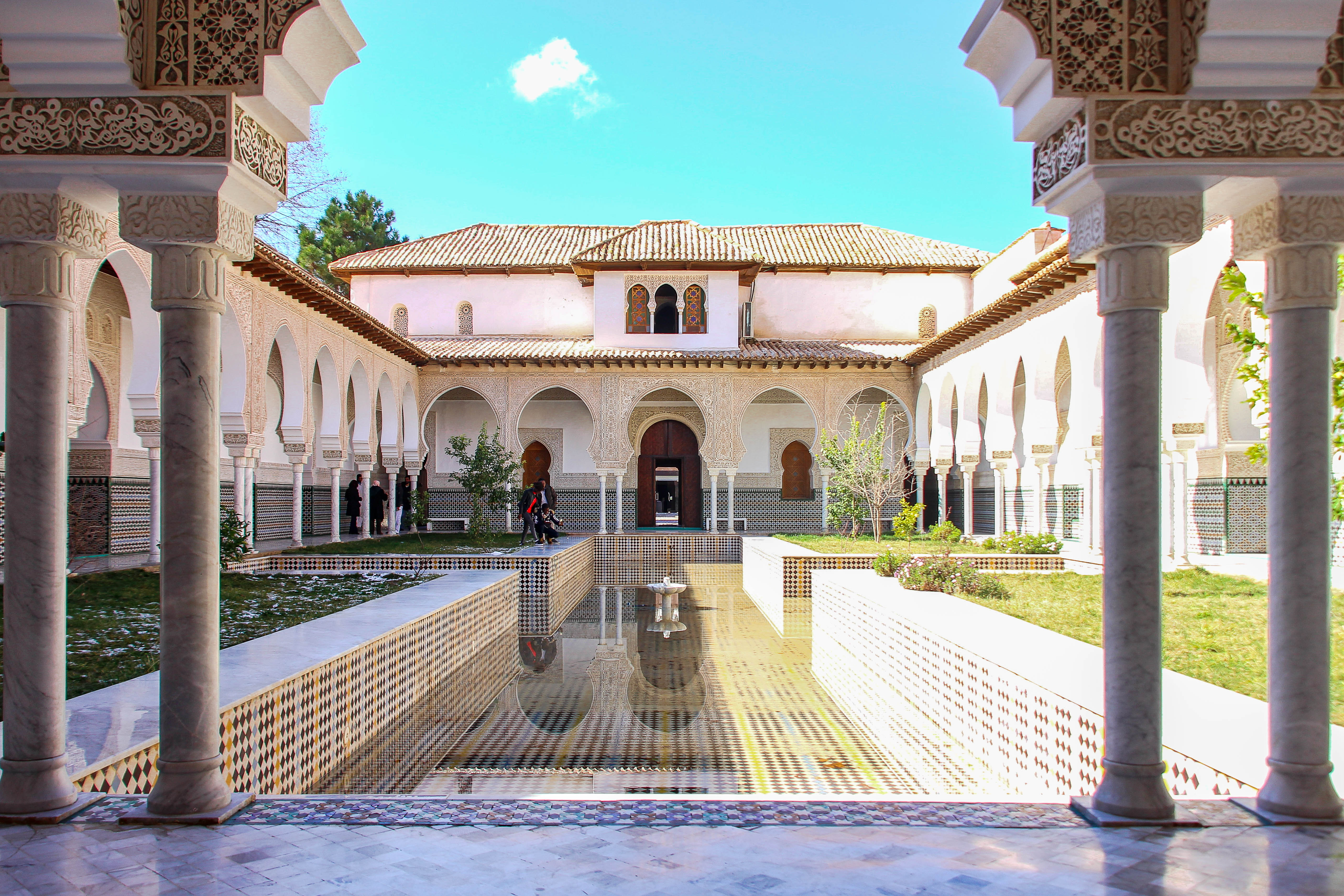
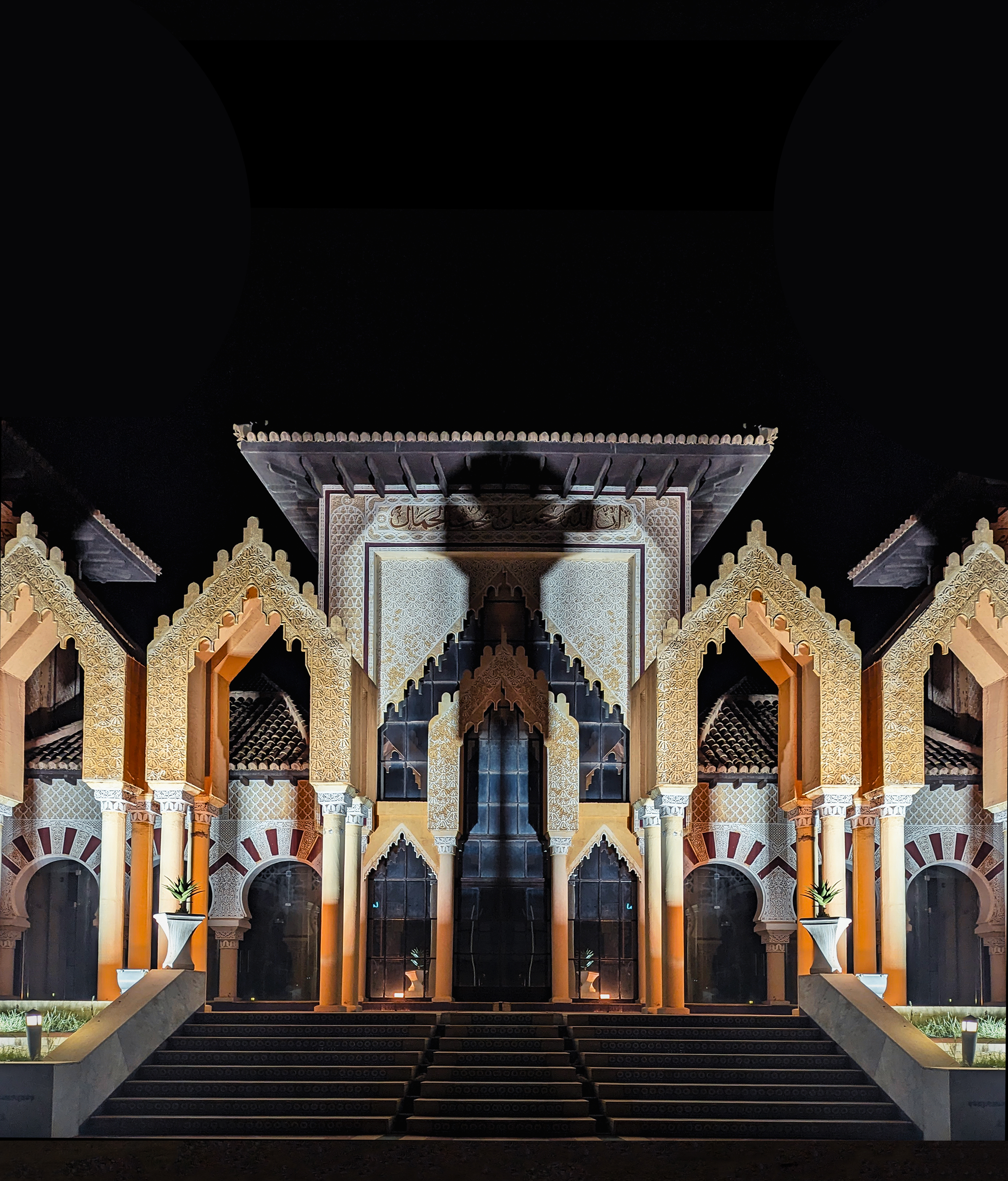
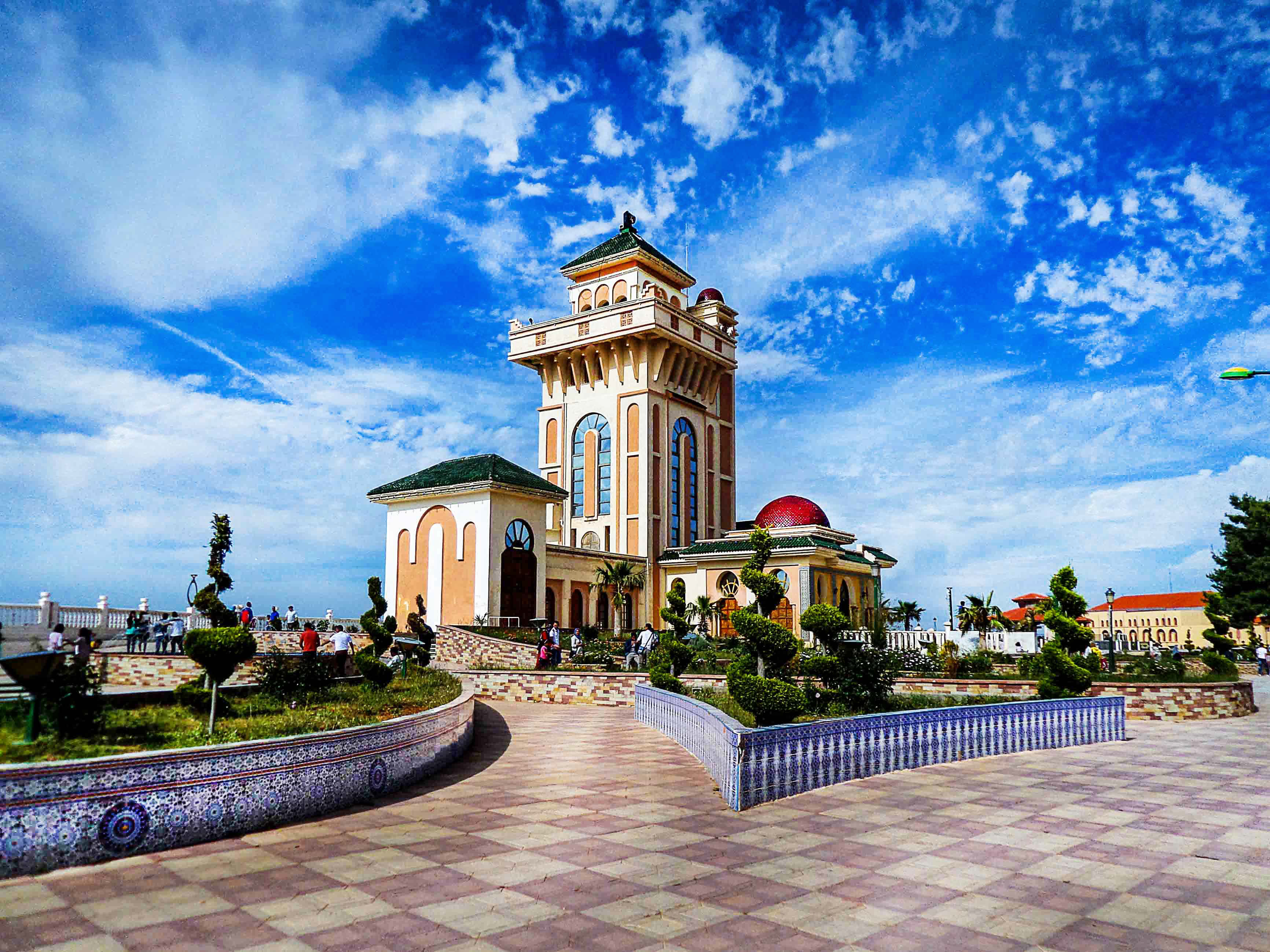
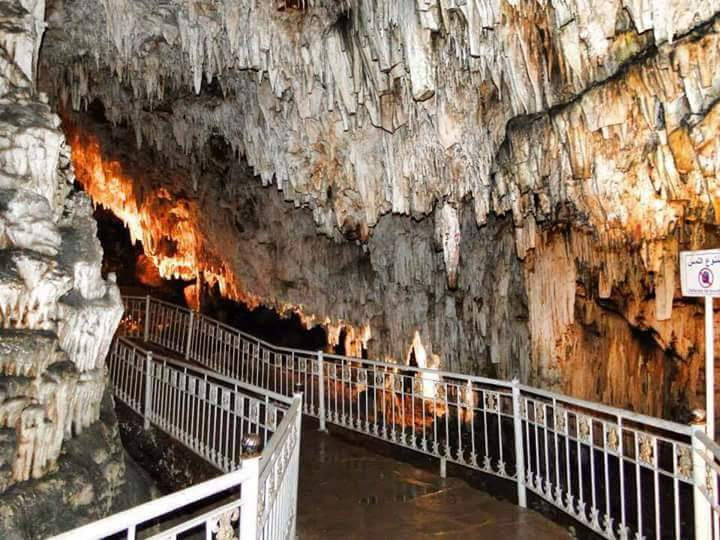
- Great Mosque of Tlemcen Sidi Boumediène Mausoleum Mansourah Mosque El Ourit Waterfalls El Mechouar Palace Andalusian Studies Center Lalla Setti Beni Add Caves

- Location of Tlemcen in the Tlemcen Province

- Location within Algeria
- Coordinates: 34°52′58″N 01°19′00″W
- Country: Algeria
- Province: Tlemcen
- District: Tlemcen District

Area
  - City: 40.11 km^{2} (15.49 sq mi)
- Elevation: 842 m (2,762 ft)

Population (2008)
  - City: 173,531
  - Estimate (2026): 209,575
  - Density: 4,326/km^{2} (11,210/sq mi)
  - Urban: 301,980
- Postal code: 13000
- Climate: Csa

Tlemcen (/tlɛmˈsɛn/; Arabic: تِلِمْسَان, romanized: Tilimsān) is the second-largest city in northwestern Algeria after Oran and the capital of Tlemcen Province. The city has developed leather, carpet, and textile industries, which it exports through the port of Rachgoun. It had a population of 140,158, as of the 2008 census.

A major centre of the Central Maghreb, the city is a mix of Arab, Berber, Andalusi, Ottoman, and Western influences. From this mosaic of influences, the city derives the title of capital of Andalusian art in Algeria. Various titles are attributed to the city including "the Pearl of the Maghreb", "the African Granada".

== Etymology ==
The name Tlemcen (Tilimsân) was given by the Zayyanid King Yaghmurasen ibn Zyan. One possible etymology is that it comes from a Berber word tilmas 'spring, water-hole', or from the combination of the Berber words tala 'fountain', the preposition m-, and sân 'two', thus meaning 'two fountains'. Another proposed etymology is from the Zanata words talam 'junction' and sân 'two', referring to the town's geographic position, which links the desert regions to the south with the mountainous regions to the north.

== History ==
Timeline of Tlemcen (Pomaria)
Historical affiliations

Roman Empire 2nd century–c. 429
Agadir c. 429–c. 477
Kingdom of Masuna c. 477–578
Kingdom of Altava 578–708
Umayyad Caliphate 708–c. 757
Emirate of Tlemcen c. 757–790
Rustamid dynasty 790–798
Idrisid dynasty 798–831
Rustamid dynasty 831–902
Idrisid dynasty 902–919
Fatimid Caliphate 919–944
Zirid dynasty 944–982
Zenata 982–1015
Hammadid Emirate 1015–1083
Almoravid dynasty 1083–1147
Almohad Caliphate 1147–1235
Kingdom of Tlemcen 1235–1337
Marinid Sultanate 1337–1348
Kingdom of Tlemcen 1348–1551
Regency of Algiers, (tributary of the Ottoman Empire) 1551–1832
Emirate of Mascara 1832–1836
France, (French Algeria) 1836–1837
Emirate of Mascara 1837–1842
France, (French Algeria) 1842–1962
Algeria 1962–present

=== Prehistory ===
The areas surrounding Tlemcen were inhabited during the Neolithic period, as evidenced by the discovery of polished axes in the caves of Boudghene by Gustave-Marie Bleicher in 1875.

There are three important prehistoric sites in the region: lake Karar, located one kilometer south of Remchi; the rock shelters of Mouilah, 5 km north of Maghnia; and the deposit called "d'Ouzidan", 2 km west of Aïn El Hout. The shelters found at the Mouilah and Boudghene show evidence of long periods of pre-historic human habitation.

=== Antiquity ===
In AD 17, Tacfarinas led the Gaetuli to revolt against the Romans.

Tlemcen became a military outpost of Ancient Rome in the 2nd century CE under the name of Pomaria. It was then an important city in the North Africa see of the Roman Catholic Church, where it was the center of a diocese. Its bishop, Victor, was a prominent representative at the Council of Carthage (411), and its bishop Honoratus was exiled in 484 by the Vandal king Huneric for denying Arianism.

It was a center of a large Christian population for many centuries after the city's Arab conquest in 708 AD.

=== Early Islamic period ===
In the later eighth century and the ninth century, the city became a Kingdom of Banu Ifran with a Sufri Kharijite orientation. These same Berber Kharijis also began to develop various small Saharan oases and to link them into regular trans-Saharan caravan routes terminating at Tlemcen, beginning a process that would determine Tlemcen's historical role for almost all of the next millennium. In the late 8th century a settlement named Agadir existed on the site of former Roman Pomaria. Idris I founded a congregational mosque here, the Great Mosque of Agadir, circa 790 (no longer extant).

In 1081 or 1082 the Almoravid leader Yusuf ibn Tashfin founded the city of Tagrart ("encampment" in Berber language), just west of Agadir. The fusion of the two settlements of Tagrart and Agadir over time became what is now Tlemcen. At the same time as he founded Tagrart, Ibn Tashfin founded its congregational mosque, known today as the Great Mosque of Tlemcen, which was expanded in 1126 by his son and successor 'Ali Ibn Yusuf. He built a governor's residence next to it, known after as the Qasr al-Qadim ("Old Palace").

In the book Al-Istibsar fi 'agaib al-Amsar, written in the late 12th century, the author wrote: “It is a great and ancient city with numerous timeless ruins, indicating that it was once the capital of past nations. It lies at the foot of a mountain, most of whose trees are walnut. The city once had water brought in by the works of early civilizations from a spring called Burit, located six miles away. A large river, known as Satafsaif, flows through it. Tlemcen was the capital of the Zanata [tribe] kingdom and was surrounded by many tribes, both from Zanata and other Berber groups. It is a land of great fertility, with abundant resources, low prices, and plentiful blessings. The city governs many villages, continuous settlements, and numerous towns under its administration. Adjacent to Tlemcen, there is a fortified citadel rich in fruit-bearing trees and abundant in water and rivers. Connected to it is Mount Tawraniya, a vast, inhabited mountain filled with villages and continuous settlements."

Control of the region passed from the Almoravids to the Almohad Caliphate in the mid-twelfth century. After its conquest, the Almohad ruler 'Abd al-Mu'min surrounded the city with a wall in 1145 and built a new citadel. However, in the early thirteenth century, 'Abdallah ibn Ghaniya attempted to restore Almoravid control of the Maghreb. In about 1209, the region around Tlemcen was devastated by retreating Almoravid forces, not long before their final defeat by the Almohads at the Battle of Jebel Nafusa in 1210. Despite the destruction of Tlemcen's already-feeble agricultural base, Tlemcen rose to prominence as a major trading and administrative center in the region under the ensuing reign of the Almohads.

=== Zayyanid period ===
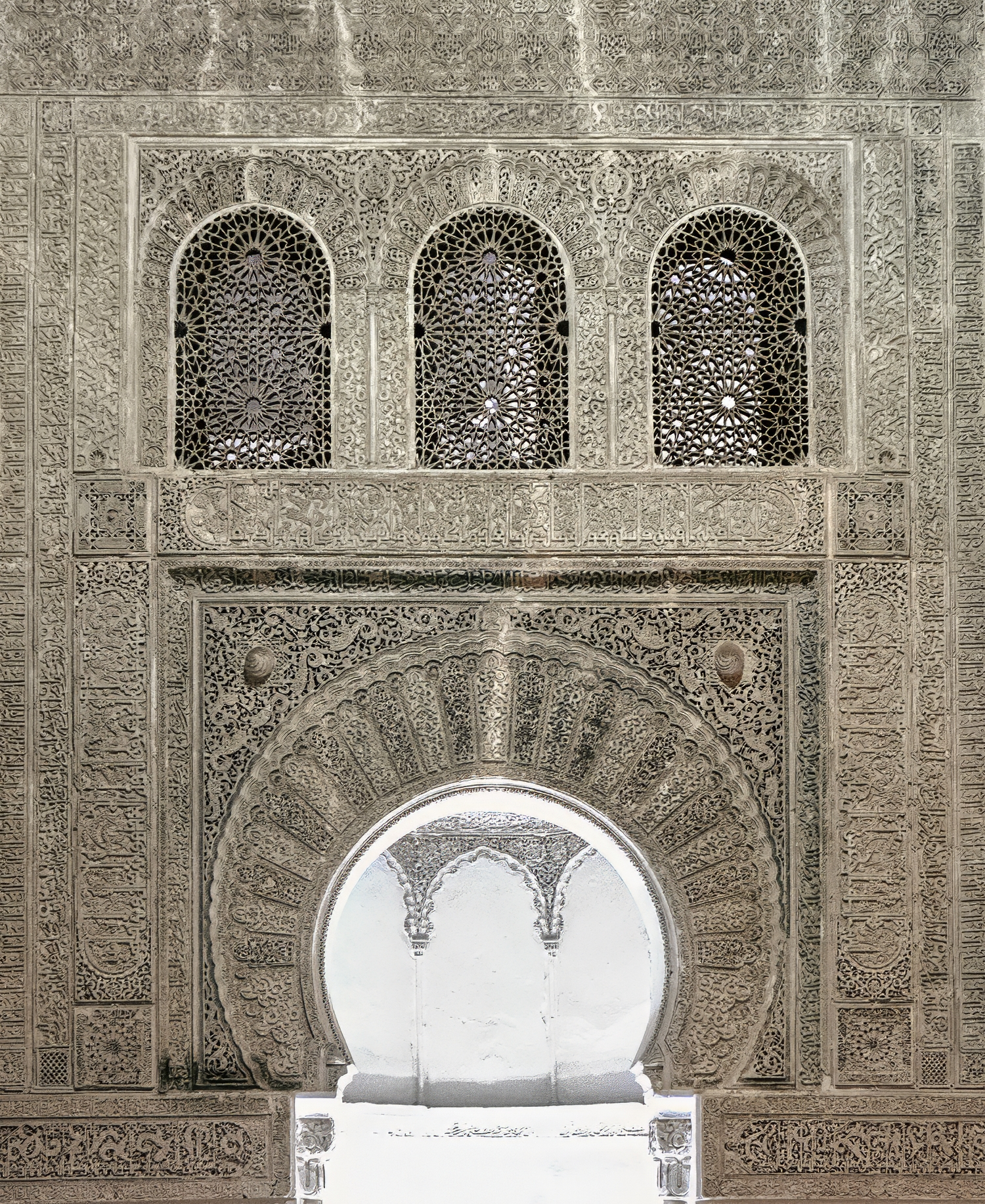
Mihrab of the Sidi Bel Hasan mosque, built by the Zayyanids

After the end of Almohad rule in the 1230s, Tlemcen became the capital of one of the three successor states, the Zayyanid Kingdom of Tlemcen (1236–1554). The Zayyanid ruler Yaghmurasen Ibn Zyan succeeded in merging Agadir and Tagrart into a single city and gave it the name Tlemcen. Initially, Yagmurasen resided in the Qasr al-Qadim but he soon moved the seat of power to a new citadel, the Mechouar, towards the mid 13th century. The city was thereafter ruled for centuries by successive Zayyanid sultans. During this era it was one of the most important economic and cultural centers in the region, alongside other political capitals like Fez, Tunis, and Granada. During the Middle Ages, Tlemcen not only served as a trading city connecting the "coastal" route across the Maghreb with the trans-Saharan caravan routes, but also housed a European trading center, or funduk which connected African and European merchants. African gold arrived in Tlemcen from south of the Sahara through Sijilmasa or Taghaza and entered European hands. Consequently, Tlemcen was partially integrated into the European financial system. For example, Genoese bills of exchange circulated there, at least among merchants not subject to (or not deterred by) religious prohibitions.

At the peak of its success in the first half of the fourteenth century, Tlemcen was a city of perhaps 40,000 inhabitants. It housed several well-known madrasas and numerous wealthy religious foundations, and became the principal centers of culture in the central Maghreb. The Zayyanids were the first to sponsor of the construction of madrasas in this part of the Maghreb, and among the most famous in Tlemcen was the Tashfiniya Madrasa founded by Abu Tashfin I (r. 1318–1337). At the souk around the Great Mosque, merchants sold woolen fabrics and rugs from the East, slaves and gold from across the Sahara, local earthenware and leather goods, and a variety of Mediterranean maritime goods "redirected" to Tlemcen by corsairs—in addition to imported European goods available at the funduk. Merchant houses based in Tlemcen, such as the al-Makkari, maintained regular branch offices in Mali and the Sudan.

Later in the fourteenth century, the city twice fell under the rule of the Marinid sultan, Abu al-Hasan Ali (1337–1348) and his son Abu 'Inan. Both times the Marinids found that they were unable to hold the region against local resistance. Nevertheless, these episodes appear to have marked the beginning of the end. Over the following two centuries, Zayyanid Tlemcen was intermittently a vassal of Ifriqiya (then governed by the Hafsid dynasty), Maghrib al-Aqsa (then governed by the Marinid dynasty), or Aragon. When the Spanish took the city of Oran from the Zayyanids in 1509, continuous pressure from the Berbers prompted the Spanish to start a campaign against Tlemcen in 1543, which ended in the capture of the city and in the installation of a vassal king on the throne.

The ruler of Tlemcen is reported to have been advised by a Jewish viceroy named Abraham, who, in the time of the Inquisition of Torquemada, opened the gates of Tlemcen to Jewish and Muslim refugees fleeing Spain. Abraham is said to have supported them with his own money and with the tolerance of the king of Tlemcen.

=== Regency of Algiers ===
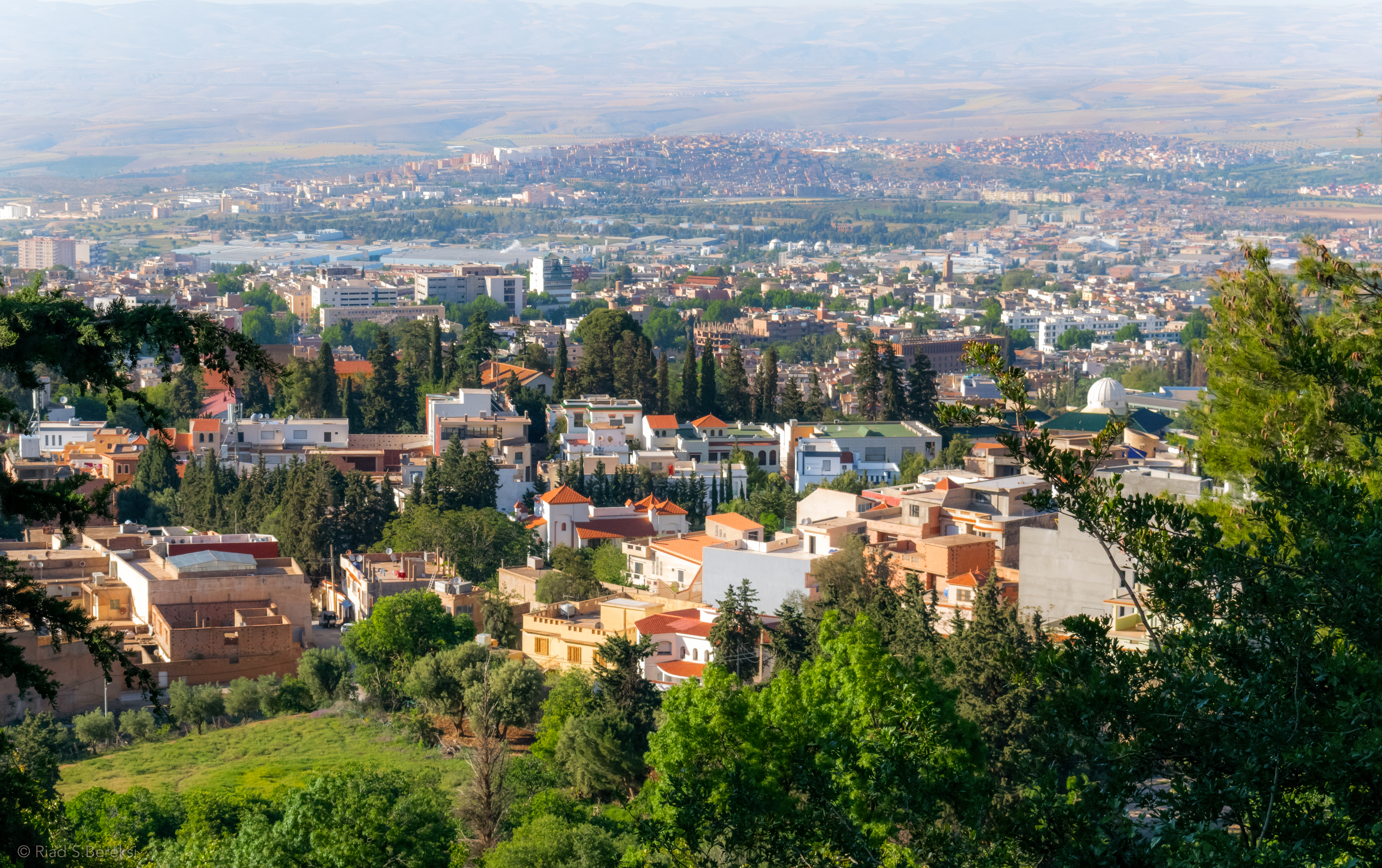
A general view of the city from the heights of Lalla Setti.

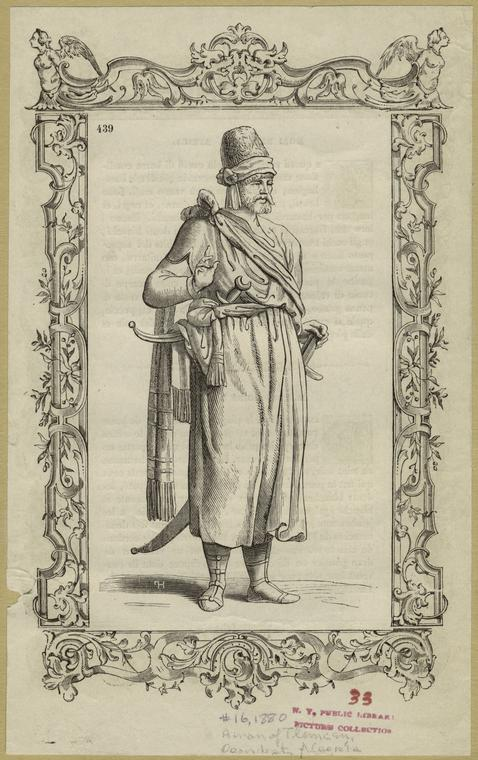
A man of Tlemcen

In 1551, Tlemcen came under Ottoman rule after the Campaign of Tlemcen. Tlemcen and the Algerian provinces regained effective independence in their own affairs in 1671, although Tlemcen was no longer a government seat as before. The Spanish were evicted from Oran in 1792, but thirty years later, they were replaced by the French, who seized Algiers. A French fleet bombarded Algiers in 1830, at which point the dey capitulated to French colonial rule; a broad coalition of natives continued to resist, coordinated loosely at Tlemcen.

At the beginning of the 19th century, Tlemcen had only 10,000 inhabitants, the majority of whom were Kouloughlis. The collapse of Turkish power in Algiers had a negative impact on the urban fabric, particularly due to endemic conflicts between the urban population, from the various Berber and Arab tribes, and that of the Kouloughlis8, hence the ruin of a large part of the urban fabric.

=== French Algeria ===
The collapse of Turkish power in Algiers had a negative impact on the urban fabric, particularly due to endemic conflicts between the city's population, drawn from various Berber and Arab tribes, and the Kouloughlis. The city of Tlemcen was made up of three separate quarters inhabited by three socio-ethnic groups. The upper or western part was occupied by the Kouloughlis; the Hadars lived in the lower part; and finally, the Jews settled in the lower or central area, located north of the Mechouar.

The Kouloughli population, who had become very proud of their origins, had always maintained close relations with the East, with Damascus and Constantinople. Shortly after the invasion of Louis Alexis Desmichels, the Emir entered Tlemcen (July 17, 1833) where he had his authority recognized, except for the Turks and the Kouloughlis who were confined in the "Mechouar".

In 1836, Marshal Clausel entered the city of Tlemcen, deserted by the Moors, to relieve the Kouloughlis garrison of the mechouar. The Kouloughlis, entrenched around the mechouar, were opposed to Emir Abdelkader and allied themselves with the French. The latter appointed Moustapha-ben-Mekallech (son of Mekallech the former Bey of Oran in the Regency of Algiers) as "Bey of Tlemcen". In 1910–1911, a significant exodus of Tlemcenians, 508 families opposed to conscription, was justified by the General Council of Oran as being the work of Kouloughli families, based on the analysis of the names on the list of Tlemcenians who left for Syria.

Tlemcen was a vacation spot and retreat for French settlers in Algeria, who found it far more temperate than Oran or Algiers. The city adapted and became more cosmopolitan, with a unique outlook on art and culture, and its architecture and urban life evolved to accommodate this new sense. In the independence movements of the mid-twentieth century, it was relatively quiet, reflecting the city's sense of aloofness from the turbulence of Algiers. In 1943 Tlemcen was little more than a railway halt. On January 13, 1943 a British and American train patrol engaged in a skirmish with the retreating troops of the Afrika Korps. As the US Army marched eastwards from its Moroccan landing grounds, the British 8th Army drove west, forcing the Germans into an evacuation pocket at Tunis. Between 1942 and 1943, before embarking for Italy, the US Army Medical Corps established two fixed hospitals at Tlemcen: 9th Evacuation (as station), 12–26 December 1942. Seven hundred and fifty beds and 32d Station, 28 February – 28 November 1943, 500 beds.

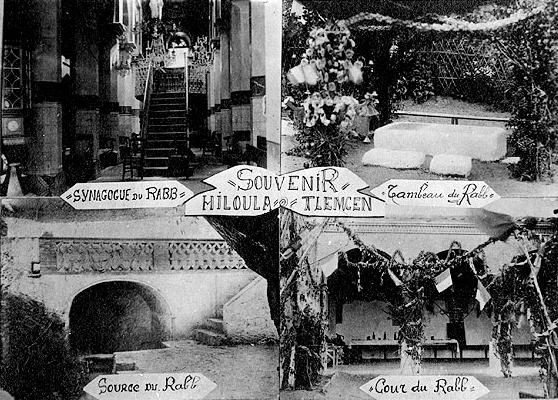
Postcard from 1914 showing the places in Tlemcen related to the Rabb Ephraim Alnaqua and the hiloula on his death anniversary

The most important place for pilgrimage of all religions into Tlemcen was the Jewish cemetery on the outskirts of town. Up to 10,000 people worldwide made the journey to the site. Nonetheless, despite religious freedoms, their community had never numbered more than 5,000–6,000 in the 20th century, and discriminatory laws of had been in force since 1881. After Algerian independence in 1962, most of the small Jewish population evacuated to metropolitan France. During the colonial period they served in the French Army. French Jews of the Alliance Israélite Universelle paid for a local Jewish school, which closed in 1934, perhaps owing to the rise of Fascism. In 2009 Jordanian sources reported that the Algerian government intended to restore the damaged Jewish tombs at the historic cemetery.

== Climate ==
Tlemcen has a hot semi-arid climate (Köppen climate classification BSh).

Climate data for Tlemcen (1991–2020)
Month	Jan	Feb	Mar	Apr	May	Jun	Jul	Aug	Sep	Oct	Nov	Dec	Year
Record high °C (°F)	29.5 (85.1)	33.5 (92.3)	35.7 (96.3)	35.7 (96.3)	42.1 (107.8)	41.5 (106.7)	47.0 (116.6)	46.2 (115.2)	41.5 (106.7)	40.3 (104.5)	33.1 (91.6)	30.4 (86.7)	47.0 (116.6)
Mean daily maximum °C (°F)	16.8 (62.2)	17.7 (63.9)	20.1 (68.2)	22.3 (72.1)	25.8 (78.4)	29.6 (85.3)	33.2 (91.8)	33.8 (92.8)	30.0 (86.0)	26.4 (79.5)	20.9 (69.6)	17.8 (64.0)	24.5 (76.1)
Daily mean °C (°F)	11.1 (52.0)	11.9 (53.4)	14.0 (57.2)	16.0 (60.8)	19.3 (66.7)	23.0 (73.4)	26.4 (79.5)	27.1 (80.8)	23.7 (74.7)	20.1 (68.2)	15.3 (59.5)	12.3 (54.1)	18.4 (65.1)
Mean daily minimum °C (°F)	5.4 (41.7)	6.1 (43.0)	7.9 (46.2)	9.7 (49.5)	12.8 (55.0)	16.4 (61.5)	19.6 (67.3)	20.4 (68.7)	17.5 (63.5)	13.8 (56.8)	9.6 (49.3)	6.9 (44.4)	12.2 (54.0)
Record low °C (°F)	−2.6 (27.3)	−3.1 (26.4)	−0.8 (30.6)	1.0 (33.8)	3.6 (38.5)	9.6 (49.3)	12.0 (53.6)	11.4 (52.5)	9.0 (48.2)	5.0 (41.0)	1.2 (34.2)	−1.5 (29.3)	−3.1 (26.4)
Average precipitation mm (inches)	48.5 (1.91)	38.4 (1.51)	40.5 (1.59)	35.0 (1.38)	25.6 (1.01)	4.3 (0.17)	1.0 (0.04)	3.7 (0.15)	15.9 (0.63)	28.9 (1.14)	46.9 (1.85)	36.8 (1.45)	325.5 (12.81)
Average precipitation days (≥ 1 mm)	6.1	5.3	5.0	5.1	3.4	0.9	0.3	0.6	2.3	3.9	5.2	5.7	43.8
Mean monthly sunshine hours	202.0	200.3	233.3	260.6	298.8	322.9	330.1	315.7	261.8	239.7	199.6	192.1	3,056.9
Source: NOAA

== Culture ==
Its history and culture have made the city a center of music and art. Its textiles and handcrafts, its display of Andalusi culture, and its cool climate in the mountains have made it an important center of tourism in Algeria. It is home to a tomb—that of Sidi Boumédiène, whose tomb adjoins a mosque. The Great Mosque of Tlemcen was completed in 1136 and is said to be the most remarkable remaining example of Almoravid architecture.

== Media ==
=== Newspapers ===
- Le Petit Tlemcenien, French language weekly (1882)

== Notable people ==
- Ahmed Mohammed al-Maqqari (1591–1632), historian
- Eugénie Buffet (1866–1934), French singer
- Messali Hadj (1898–1974), nationalist politician
- Abdelhalim Hemche (1908–1979), painter
- Paul Bénichou (1908–2001), French writer and historian
- Mohammed Dib (1920–2003), writer
- Benaouda Benzerdjeb (1921–1956), physician and martyr
- Bachir Yellès (1921–2022), painter
- Sid Ahmed Inal (born 1931), activist
- Mourad Medelci (1943–2019), politician
- Rachid Baba Ahmed (1946–1995), singer and composer
- Sami Naïr (born 1946), political philosopher
- Latifa Ben Mansour (born 1950), writer
- Patrick Bruel (born 1959), French actor and singer
- Mohamed Zaoui (born 1960), boxer
- Kheireddine Kherris (born 1973), international footballer
- Anwar Boudjakdji (born 1976), international footballer
- Kamel Habri (born 1976), international footballer

== International relations ==
=== Twin towns – sister cities ===
Tlemcen is twinned with:

- Granada, Spain
- Kairouan, Tunisia
- Jajmau, India
- Fez, Morocco
- Nanterre, France
- Lille, France
- Montpellier, France
- Kazan, Russia
- Sarajevo, Bosnia and Herzegovina

== See also ==
- WA Tlemcen
- Tlemcen National Park
- El-Ourit Waterfalls
