= Benaouda Benzerdjeb =

Algerian physician (1921–1956)

- بن عودة بن زرجب
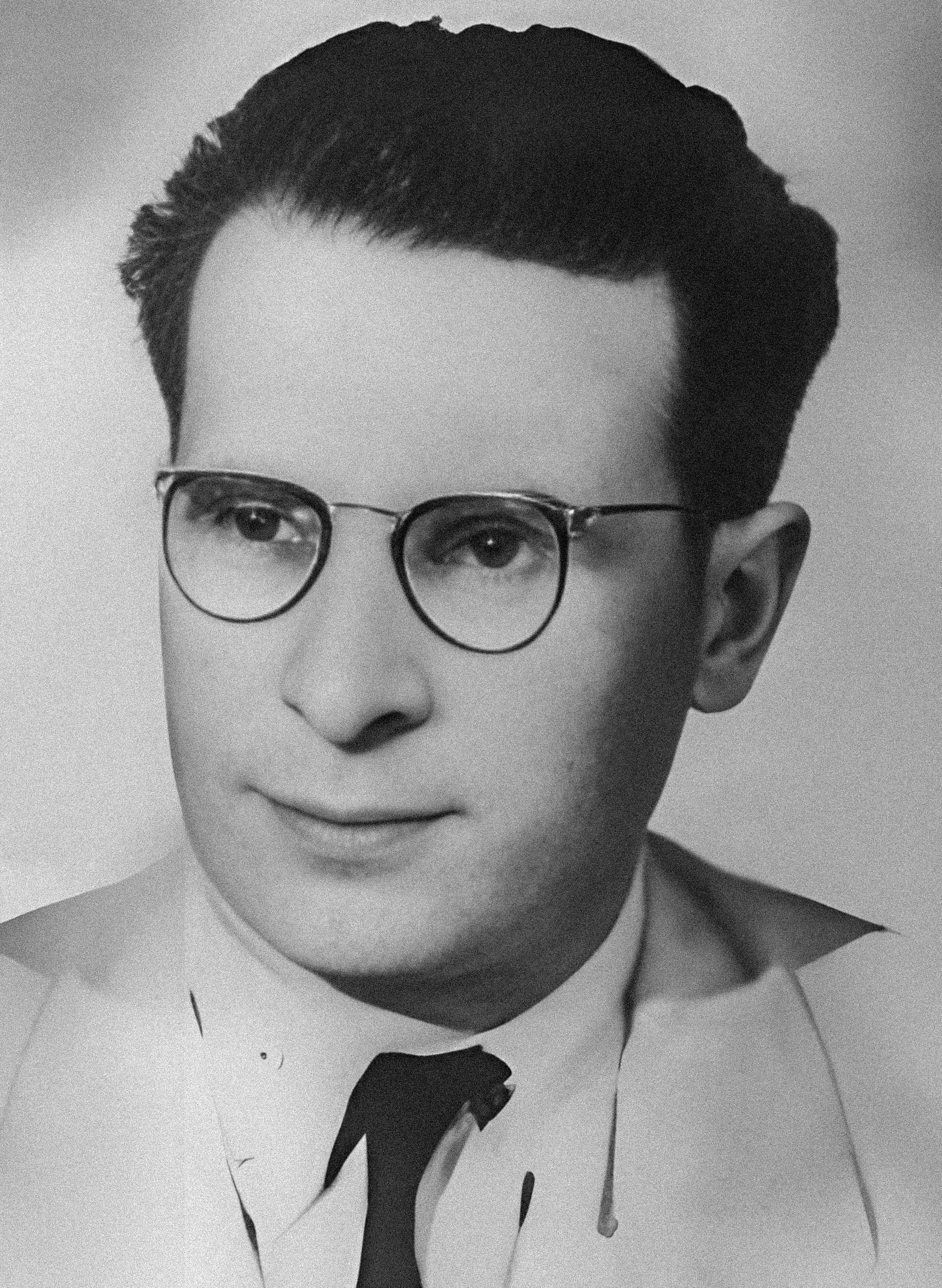
- Born: February 9, 1921; Tlemcen
- Died: January 16, 1956 (aged 34)
- Known for: First medical martyr during the Algerian war

Benaouda Benzerdjeb was an Algerian doctor, born on February 9, 1921, in Tlemcen and died on January 16, 1956, in the village of Ouled Halima, near Sebdou, 36 km from Tlemcen. He was the first medical martyr to die during the Algerian war.

== Biography ==
Benzerdjeb completed his schooling at De Slane College (now Ibn Khaldoun) in Tlemcen and obtained his baccalaureate in the mathematics stream in June 1941. After pursuing higher studies in Montpellier and Paris, he obtained his medical doctorate in 1948.

His nationalist ideas led him to join the Movement for the Triumph of Democratic Freedoms Liberties (MTLD) and take on responsibilities within the Algerian student movement. He served as the general treasurer of the Association of Algerian Muslim Students.

Benzerdjeb used his profession to engage in revolutionary activities. In utmost secrecy, he would receive injured mujahideen (fighters) at his clinic and sometimes relay orders from higher authorities of the National Liberation Front (FLN) to them. He would also venture into the maquis to provide assistance. Using a duplicating machine, he would distribute and print propaganda leaflets for the revolution.

His activities were soon discovered by the French authorities, and on January 17, 1956, he was arrested and executed near the village of Ould H'lima, close to Sebdou in southern Tlemcen.

On January 16, 1956, Dr. Benzerdjeb was arrested by the Gendarmes of the Sebdou Brigade. In the afternoon, he met with Hubert Clément, the brigade commander. The following morning, on the orders of the commander, a group of gendarmes accompanied the doctor to the location of a hideout. According to the Gendarmerie report, the prisoner allegedly attempted to escape and was shot by one of the gendarmes at Douar Ouled H'lima. However, the circumstances surrounding Dr. Benzerdjeb's death are the subject of much controversy. According to several sources, he may have been tortured.

On January 17, in response to this execution, the city of Tlemcen experienced unrest that lasted several days.
