= Tlemcen National Park =

National park in Algeria

- IUCN category II (national park)
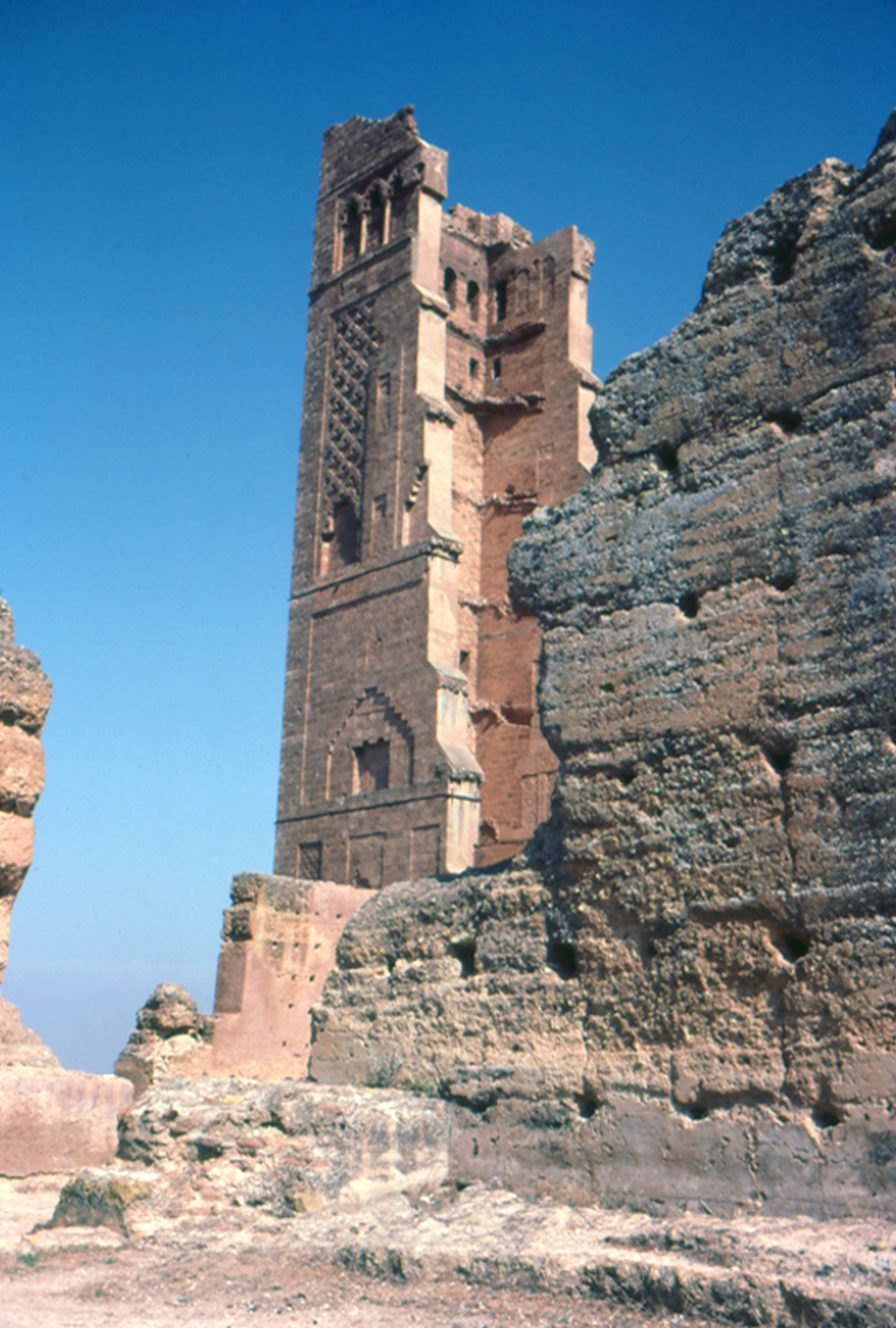
- A Ruin of Mansoura

- Location within Algeria
- Interactive map of Tlemcen National Park
- Location: Tlemcen Province, Algeria
- Nearest city: Tlemcen
- Coordinates: 34°53′N 1°18′W
- Area: 82.25 km^{2} (31.76 sq mi)
- Established: 1993

The Tlemcen National Park (Arabic:الحديقة الوطنية تلمسان) is one of the more recent national parks of Algeria. It is located in Tlemcen Province, named after Tlemcen, a city near this park. The park includes the forests of Ifri, Zariffet, and Aïn Fezza, the waterfalls and cliffs of El Awrit, and many archeological sites and the ruins of Mansoura, the ancient city on whose ruins Tlemcen was built, as well the Mosque of Sidi Boumediene, the patron saint of Tlemcen.

It is home to more than 141 species of animals, including 100 species of various birds, 16 species of mammals, 18 species of reptiles and 7 species of amphibians.
