= Le Petit Tlemcenien =

French language weekly published in Algeria serving the local Jewish community

- Type: Weekly
- Founded: 1882
- Language: French language
- Headquarters: Tlemcen

Le Petit Tlemcenien was a French language weekly newspaper published from Tlemcen, Algeria, serving the local Jewish community. It was founded in 1882.
