= Mansourah Mosque =

Former mosque in Tlemcen, Algeria

- مسجد المنصورة
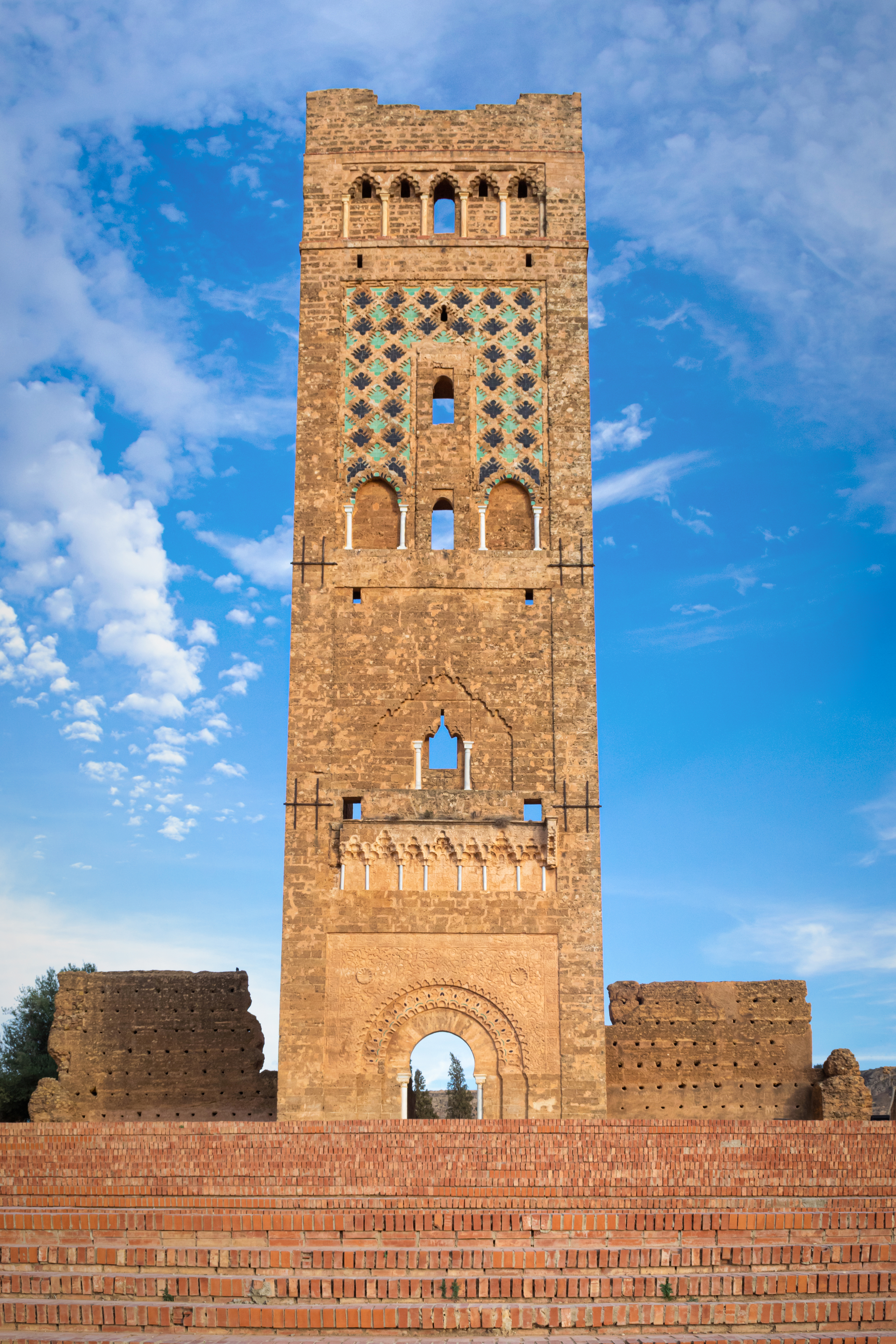
- Remnants of the minaret, in 2024

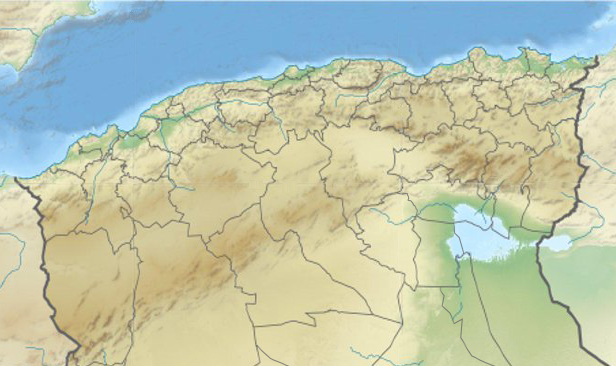
- Location of the former mosque in northern Algeria

Religion
- Affiliation: Islam (former)
- Ecclesiastical or organisational status: Mosque (former)
- Status: Abandoned (in partial ruins)

Location
- Location: Mansoura, Tlemcen National Park, Tlemcen
- Country: Algeria
- Interactive map of Mansourah Mosque
- Coordinates: 34°52′15″N 1°20′19″W

Architecture
- Type: Islamic architecture
- Founder: Abu Yaqub (1302); Abu al-Hassan (1335)
- Completed: 701 AH (1301/1302 CE); 735 AH (1334/1335 CE)

Specifications
- Minaret: 1
- Minaret height: 38 m (125 ft)

The Mansourah Mosque (Arabic: مسجد المنصورة; French: Mosquée de Mansourah) is a former mosque, in a ruinous state, located in the city of Mansourah, in the province of Tlemcen, in northwestern Algeria. The remaining structure is a national monument of Algeria and is situated within the Tlemcen National Park.

== History ==
The mosque was completed in 701 AH (1301/1302 CE), during the Marinid era and comprises part of the Mansourah Castle. Excavations revealed that the mosque was built by the Sultan Abu Yaqub, and that the decoration of the main gate was completed under the patronage of Abu al-Hassan in 735 AH (1334/1335 CE).

Inside the complex there are 13 doors which are surrounded by the wall, and a sahn with a fountain in the middle. The sahn is surrounded by three corridors, which employ similar tilework with the prayer hall. The prayer hall is connected directly to the sahn and contains tilework similar to the qibla wall, and is similar to the design on the 13th-century Baybars Mosque in Samarra. The main entrance to the mosque leads to the iconic square-shaped 38-metre-tall (125 ft) minaret, that was inspired by the minarets built by the previous dynasties in North Africa and Iberia. Only three sides of the minaret remain.

Short sections of the former mosque's walls, and onyx columns are preserved in the National Museum of Art and History in Tlemcen and in the National Museum of Antiquities and Islamic Art in Algiers.

== Gallery ==
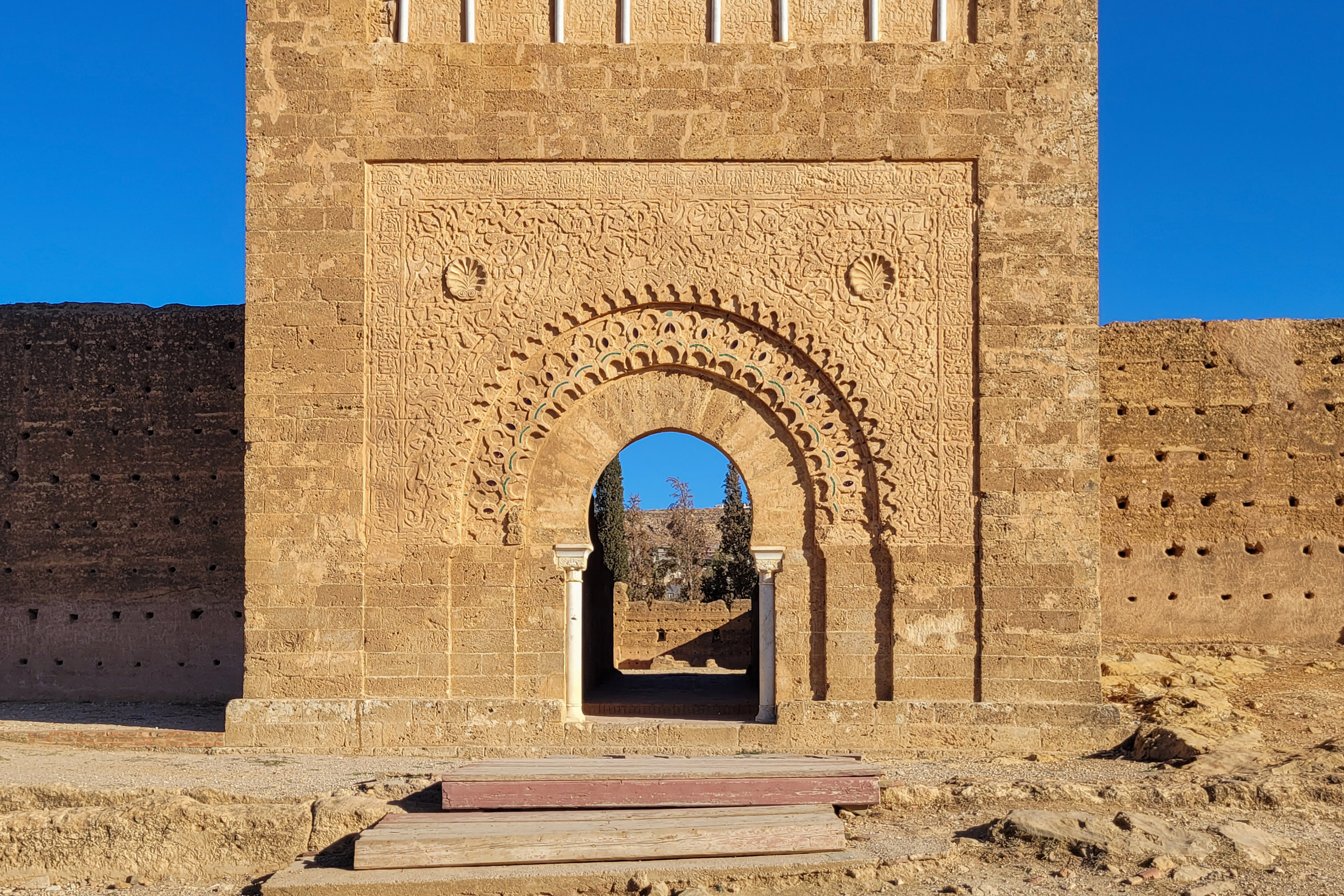
Entrance of the mosque

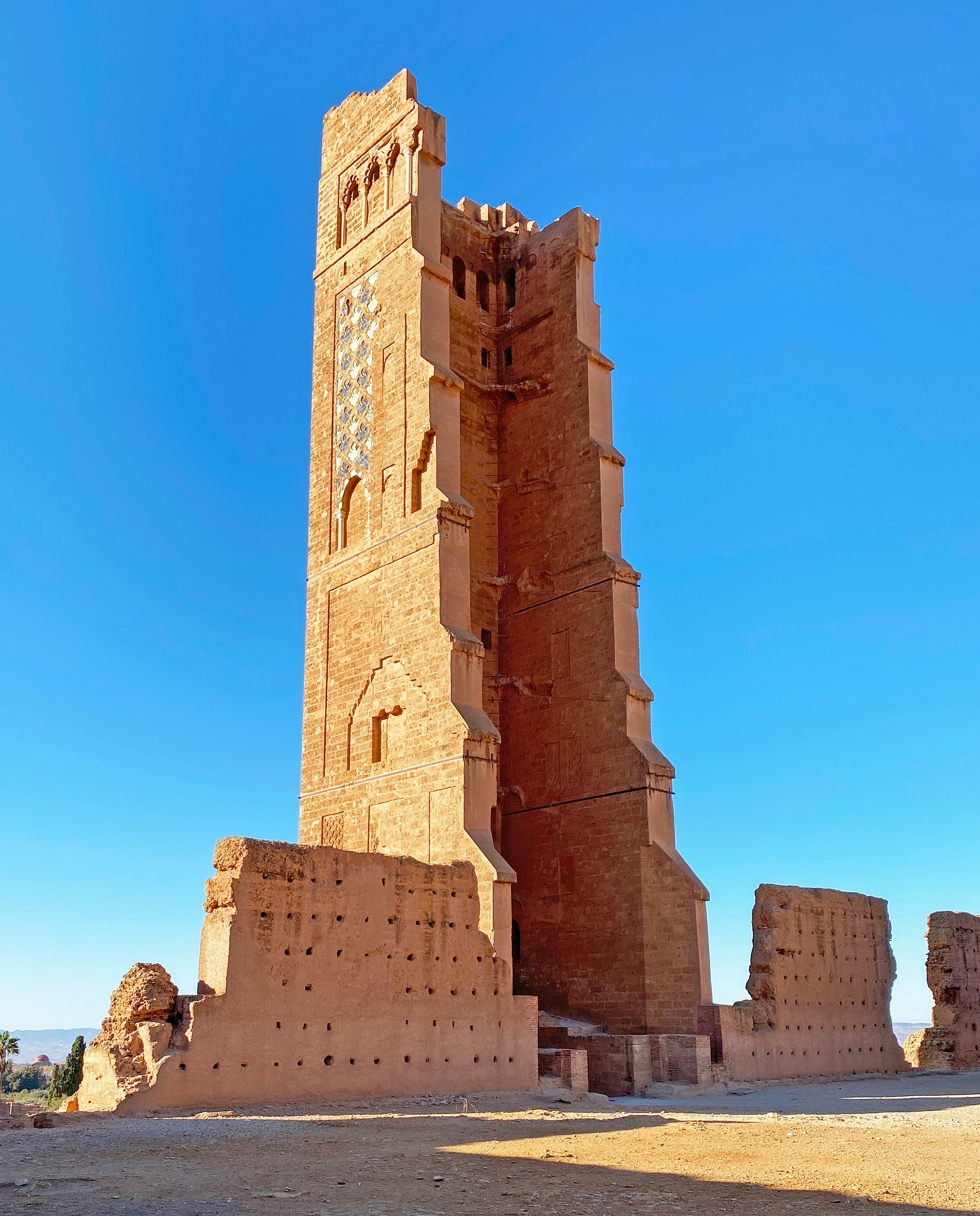
Minaret seen from the interior of the mosque

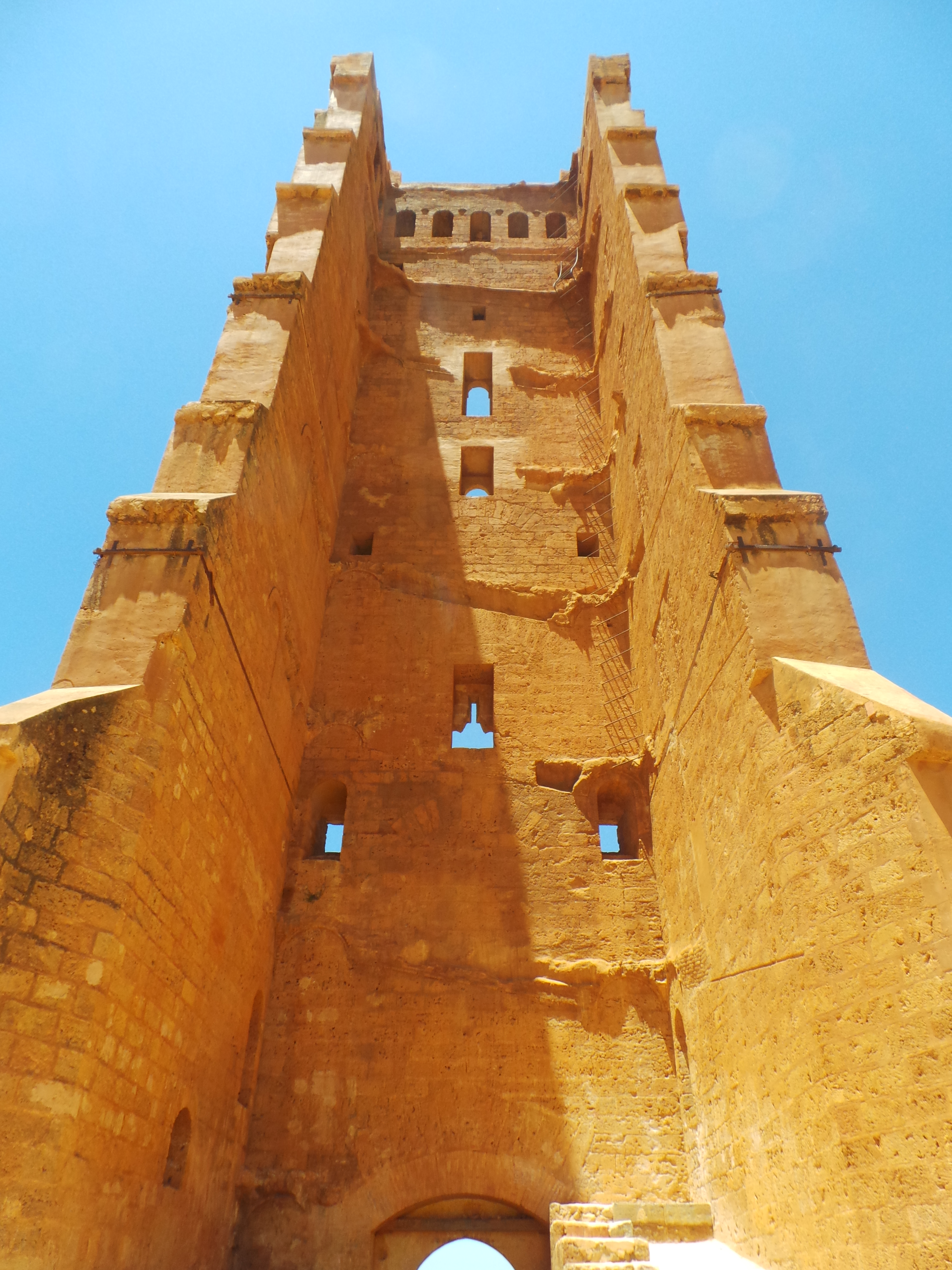
Close-up of the minaret

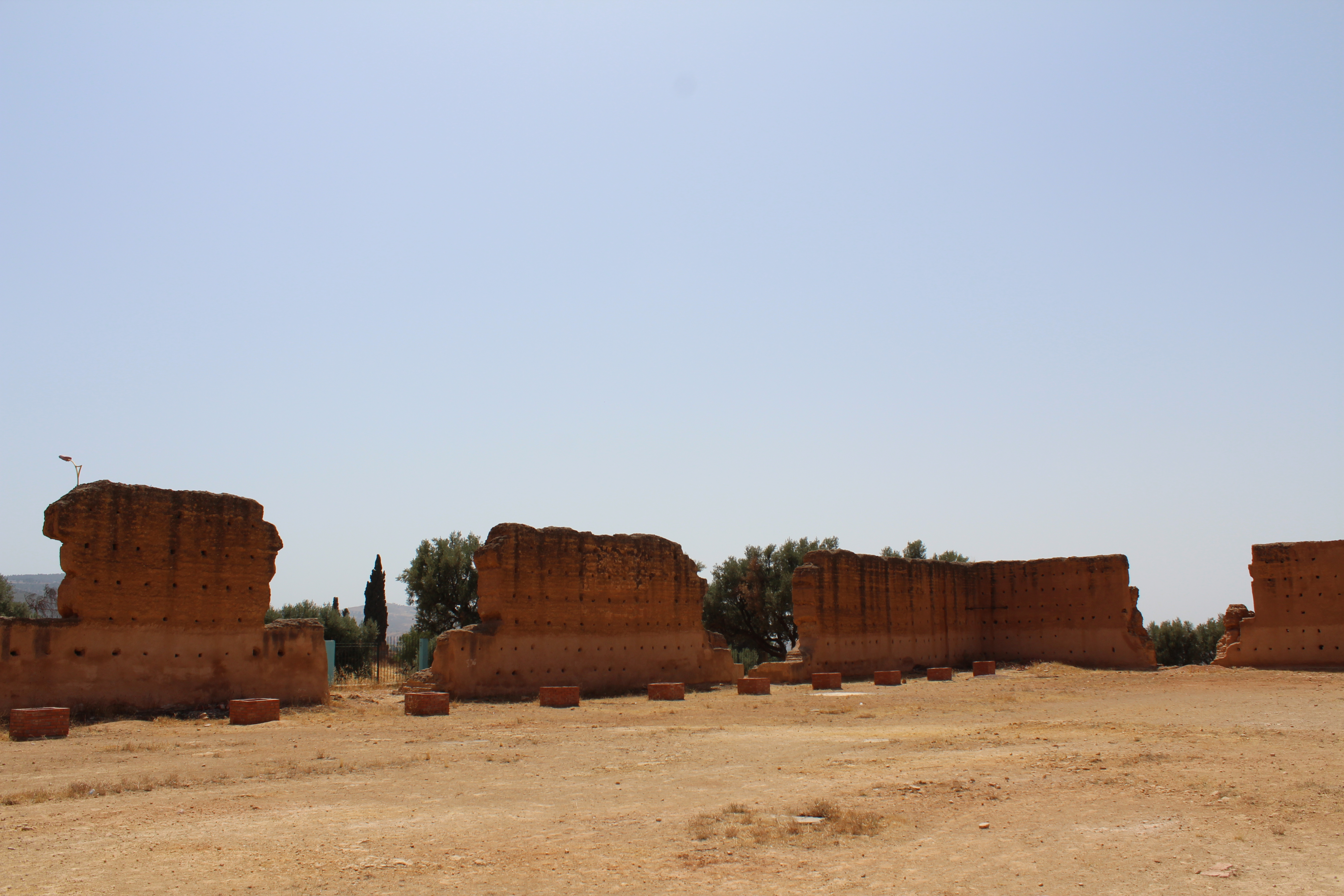
Mosque wall

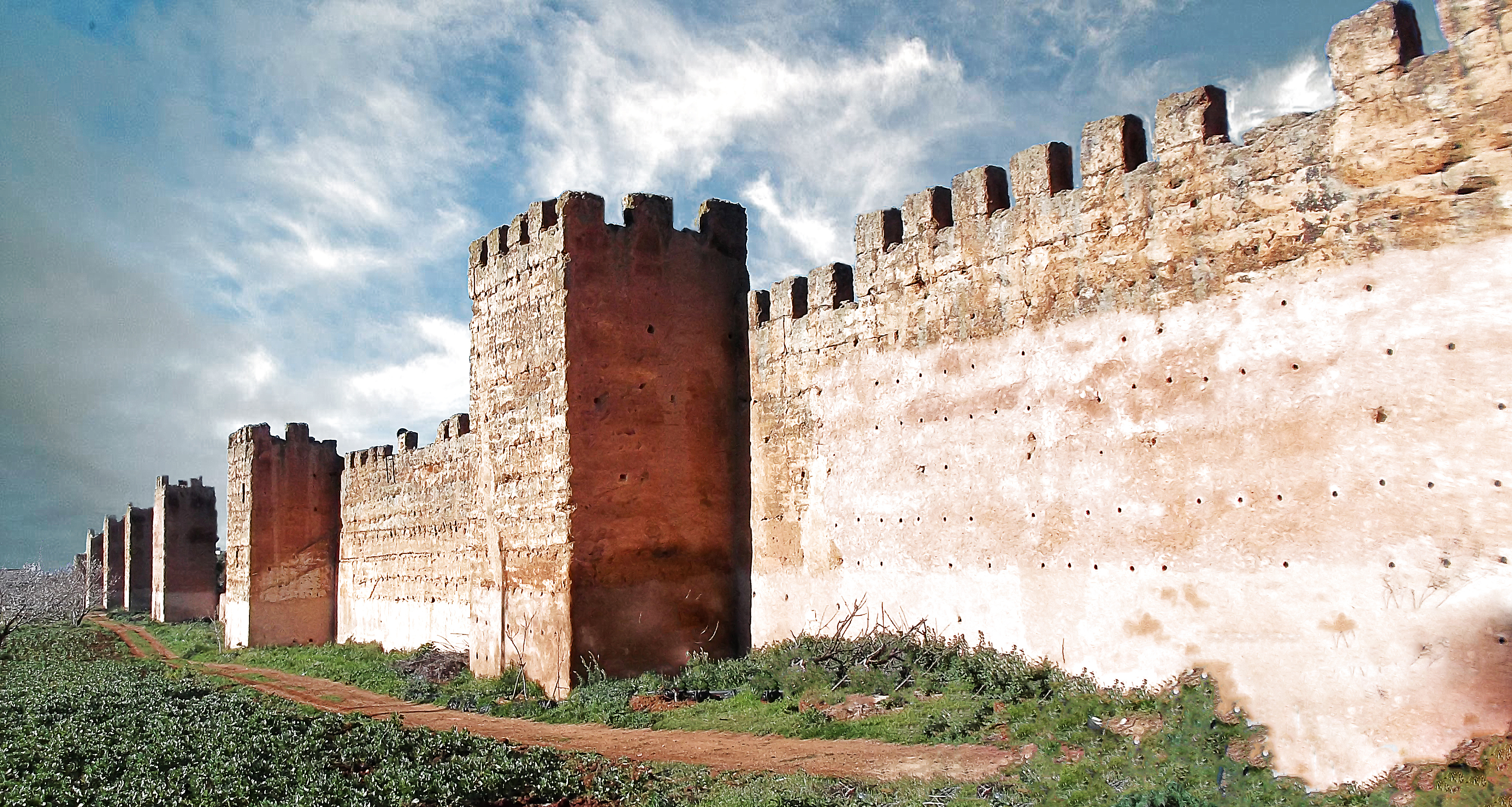
Outer castle wall

Interior of the former mosque

== See also ==
- Islam in Algeria
- List of mosques in Algeria
- List of cultural assets of Algeria in Tlemcen Province
