= A3 motorway (Algeria) =

Motorway in Algeria

A3 autoroute
- Autoroute de l'Ouest
- West Highway
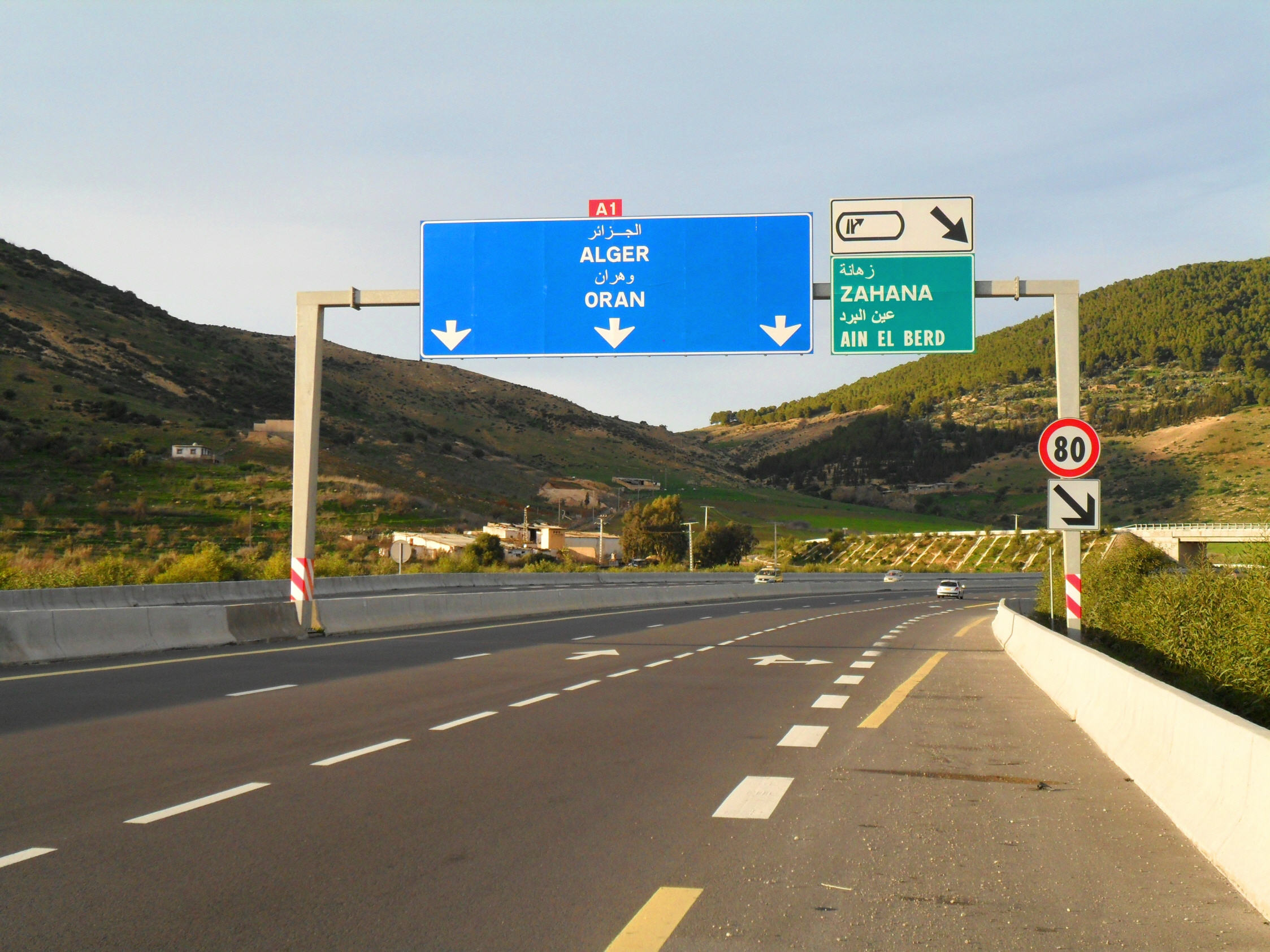

Route information
- Part of TAH 1
- Length: 510 km (320 mi)

Major junctions
- East end: Chiffa
- West end: Maghnia (Algeria-Morocco border)

Location
- Country: Algeria
- Provinces: Blida; Aïn Defla; Chlef; Relizane; Mascara; Sidi Bel Abbès; Tlemcen
- Major cities: Blida, Chlef, Relizane, Sidi Bel Abbès, Tlemcen

Highway system
- Transport in Algeria

The A3 motorway, also called the West Highway (French: Autoroute de l'Ouest; Arabic: الطريق السريع الغربي), is a toll-free controlled-access highway in Algeria. Starting in Chiffa, Blida, it spans a length of 511 km (318 mi) and ends at the Algeria-Morocco border near Maghnia, Tlemcen. The motorway also forms the western part of the East-West Highway route.

== Intersections ==
- Blida
- 1: A1 in Chiffa
- 2: W62 in Mouzaïa
- 3: N4 in El Affroun
- Aïn Defla
- 4: N4 in Boumedfaâ
- 5: 4th Ring Road of Algiers in Aïn Soltane
- 6: N18 in Khemis Miliana
- 7: N4 in Bouchared
- 8: W140 in Tiberkanine
- Chlef
- 9: W132 in Oued Fodda
- 10: N19 in Chlef
- 11: N4 in Oued Sly
- 12: W73 in Boukadir
- Relizane:
- 13: N90 in Oued Rhiou
- 14: N90A and A60 in El Hamadna
- 15: W13 in Relizane
- 16: N4 in Yellel
- Mascara
- 17: N17 in Mohammadia
- 18: N97 in Ras Ain Amirouche (Sig) and PR Mascara P6
- 19: A62 in Zahana
- Sidi Bel Abbès
- 20: N13 in Aïn El Berd
- 21: N95 in Sidi Bel Abbès
- 22: N96 Sidi Ali Boussidi
- Tlemcen
- 23: N2 in Amieur
- 24: N22 in Tlemcen
- 25: N35 in Hammam Boughrara
- 26: N7 in Maghnia
