= Merine =

Coordinates: 34°47′N 0°27′W

- Commune and town
- Merine within the province of Sidi Bel Abbès
- Country: Algeria
- Province: Sidi Bel Abbès
- District: Merine

Population (2008)
  - Total: 7,705
- Time zone: UTC+1 (CET)

Merine (Arabic: مرين, Kabyle: Mrin) is a town and commune in Sidi Bel Abbès Province in northwestern Algeria.

== Geography ==
The municipality is composed by the town of Merine and the village of Amelza. It borders with Oued Sefioun, Oued Taourira, Tafissour, Teghalimet, Telagh and Youb (in Saïda Province).
