= Télagh District =

- District

- Location within Algeria
- Country: Algeria
- Province: Sidi Bel Abbès Province
- Time zone: UTC+1 (CET)

Télagh District is a district of Sidi Bel Abbès Province, Algeria.

The district is further divided into 4 municipalities:

- Telagh
- Teghalimet
- Dhaya
- Mezaourou
