= Mostefa Ben Brahim District =

Coordinates: 35°11′33″N 0°21′32″W

- District
- Country: Algeria
- Province: Sidi Bel Abbès Province
- Capital: Mostefa Ben Brahim
- Time zone: UTC+1 (CET)

Mostefa Ben Brahim District is a district of Sidi Bel Abbès Province, Algeria.

The district is further divided into 4 municipalities:

- Mostefa Ben Brahim
- Tilmouni
- Zerouala
- Belarbi
