= Belarbi =

Belarbi is a surname. Notable people with the surname include:

- Abdeldjelil Belarbi, Algerian-American structural engineer and researcher
- Aïcha Belarbi (born 1946), Moroccan sociologist and diplomat
- Kader Belarbi (born 1962), French ballet dancer, choreographer, and director
- Kamel Belarbi (born 1997), Algerian footballer
- Malek Belarbi (born 1959), Moroccan-French singer-songwriter and record producer, son of Marie-Louise
- Marie-Louise Belarbi (1928–2020), French-Moroccan publisher and author, mother of Malek
- Mohamed Abderrahime Belarbi (born 1992), Algerian badminton player
- Sofia Belarbi (born 1998), Algerian Single Stocks trader

== See also ==
- Belarbi, Algeria, town and commune in Sidi Bel Abbès Province
