= Ténira District =

Coordinates: 35.0197°N 0.5321°W

- District
- Interactive map of Ténira District
- Country: Algeria
- Province: Sidi Bel Abbès Province
- Time zone: UTC+1 (CET)

Ténira District is a district of Sidi Bel Abbès Province, Algeria.

The district is further divided into 4 municipalities:

- Tenira
- Oued Sefioun
- Benachiba Chelia
- Hassi Dahou
