= Sidi Ali Boussidi District =

Coordinates: 35.1000°N 0.8333°W

- District
- Sidi Ali Boussidi district in Sidi Bel Abbes Province
- Country: Algeria
- Province: Sidi Bel Abbès Province
- Capital: Sidi Ali Boussidi
- Elevation: 2,000 ft (600 m)
- Time zone: UTC+1 (CET)

Sidi Ali Boussidi District is a district of Sidi Bel Abbès Province, Algeria.

The district is further divided into 4 municipalities:

- Sidi Ali Boussidi
- Aïn Kada
- Lamtar
- Sidi Dahou el Zairs

== Climate and Geography ==
Sidi Ali Boussidi District is situated at the northern part of Algeria, which allows for the district to get a much more temperate climate then the other parts of Algeria. The Köppen climate classification subtype for this climate is "Csa" (Hot-summer Mediterranean climate). The district is in a very flat plain and has a level elevation of 600 m (1,968.5 ft).
