= Sfisef District =

Coordinates: 35.2344°N 0.2434°W

- District
- Interactive map of Sfisef District
- Country: Algeria
- Province: Sidi Bel Abbès Province
- Time zone: UTC+1 (CET)

Sfisef District is a district of Sidi Bel Abbès Province, Algeria.

The district is further divided into 4 municipalities:

- Sfissef
- M'Cid
- Aïn Adden
- Boudjebaa El Bordj
