= Sidi Ali Benyoub District =

Coordinates: 34.9456°N 0.7194°W

- District
- Interactive map of Sidi Ali Benyoub District
- Country: Algeria
- Province: Sidi Bel Abbès Province
- Time zone: UTC+1 (CET)

Sidi Ali Benyoub District is a district of Sidi Bel Abbès Province, Algeria.

The district is further divided into 3 municipalities:

- Sidi Ali Benyoub
- Boukhanafis
- Tabya
