= Ben Badis District =

Coordinates: 34.9517°N 0.9139°W

- District
- Interactive map of Ben Badis District
- Country: Algeria
- Province: Sidi Bel Abbès Province
- Time zone: UTC+1 (CET)

Ben Badis District is a district of Sidi Bel Abbès Province, Algeria.

The district is further divided into 4 municipalities:

- Ben Badis
- Hassi Zehana
- Chettouane Belaila
- Badredine El Mokrani
