= Sidi Lahcène District =

Coordinates: 35.1633°N 0.6958°W

- District
- Interactive map of Sidi Lahcène District
- Country: Algeria
- Province: Sidi Bel Abbès Province
- Time zone: UTC+1 (CET)

Sidi Lahcène District is a district of Sidi Bel Abbès Province, Algeria.

The district is further divided into 4 municipalities:

- Sidi Lahcene
- Sidi Khaled
- Amarnas
- Sidi Yacoub
