= Marhoum District =

Coordinates: 34.4460°N 0.1950°W

- District
- Interactive map of Marhoum District
- Country: Algeria
- Province: Sidi Bel Abbès Province
- Time zone: UTC+1 (CET)

Marhoum District is a district of Sidi Bel Abbès Province, Algeria.

The district is further divided into 3 municipalities:

- Marhoum
- Sidi Chaib
- Bir El Hammam
