= Mérine District =

District of Algeria

Coordinates: 34.7807°N 0.4510°W

- District
- Interactive map of Mérine District
- Country: Algeria
- Province: Sidi Bel Abbès Province
- Capital: Merine
- Time zone: UTC+1 (CET)

Mérine District is a district of Sidi Bel Abbès Province, Algeria. Its capital is the town of Merine.

== Subdivision ==
- Merine
- Oued Taourira
- Tafissour
- Taoudmout
