= Moulay Slissen District =

Coordinates: 34.8167°N 0.7667°W

- District
- Interactive map of Moulay Slissen District
- Country: Algeria
- Province: Sidi Bel Abbès Province
- Time zone: UTC+1 (CET)

Moulay Slissen District is a district of Sidi Bel Abbès Province, Algeria.

The district is further divided into 3 municipalities:

- Moulay Slissen
- El Hacaiba
- Aïn Tindamine
