= Ras El Ma District =

Coordinates: 34.5000°N 0.8000°W

Ras El Ma District دائرة رأس الماء
- District
- Interactive map of Ras El Ma District
- Country: Algeria
- Province: Sidi Bel Abbès Province
- Time zone: UTC+1 (CET)

Ras El Ma District (Arabic: دائرة رأس الماء) is a district of Sidi Bel Abbès Province, Algeria.

The district is further divided into 3 municipalities:

- Ras El Ma
- Oued Sebaa
- Redjem Demouche
