= Téssala District =

Coordinates: 35.2000°N 0.8000°W

- District
- Interactive map of Téssala District
- Country: Algeria
- Province: Sidi Bel Abbès Province
- Time zone: UTC+1 (CET)

Téssala District is a district of Sidi Bel Abbès Province, Algeria.

The district is further divided into 3 municipalities:

- Tessala
- Aïn Thrid
- Sehala Thaoura
