= Aïn El Berd District =

Coordinates: 35.3658°N 0.5128°W

Aïn El Berd District Oued-Imbert
- District
- Interactive map of Aïn El Berd District
- Country: Algeria
- Province: Sidi Bel Abbès Province
- Time zone: UTC+1 (CET)

Aïn El Berd District is a district (daïra) of Sidi Bel Abbès Province, Algeria. It has a growing population due to high local birth rate and immigration from nearby villages, and has become a large daïra.

The district of Aïn El Berd includes four communes:

- Aïn El Berd (the commune)
- Makedra
- Sidi Brahim
- Sidi Hamadouche

Main settlements include:

- Aïn El Berd
- Ouled Ali
- Makedra
- Dlahim
- Sidi Hamdouche
- Sidi Brahim
- Zleifa
- Oued El Mabtouh
- Louza
