= Ben Badis =

Ben Badis may refer to:

- Abdelhamid Ben Badis (1889–1940), figure of the Islamic Reform movement in Algeria
- Abdelhamid Ben Badis Mosque, a mosque in Oran Province, Algeria
- Ben Badis, Sidi Bel Abbès, a town and commune in Sidi Bel Abbès Province, Algeria
- Ben Badis, Constantine, a town and commune in Constantine Province, Algeria
- Ben Badis District, a district in Sidi Bel Abbès Province, Algeria
