= Compagnie de l'Ouest algérien =

1881 railway company in Algeria

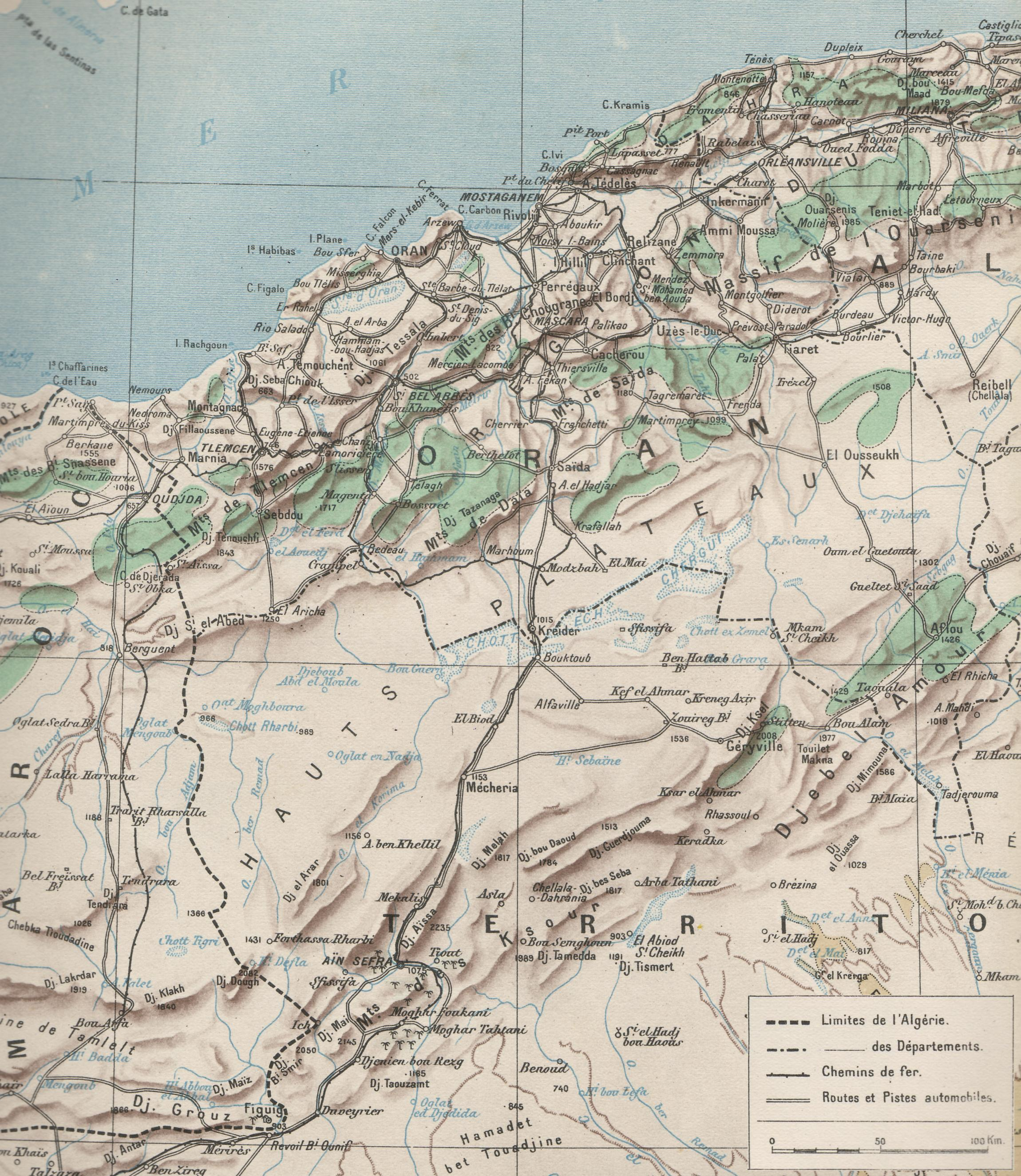
Map of the Oran department and railway lines

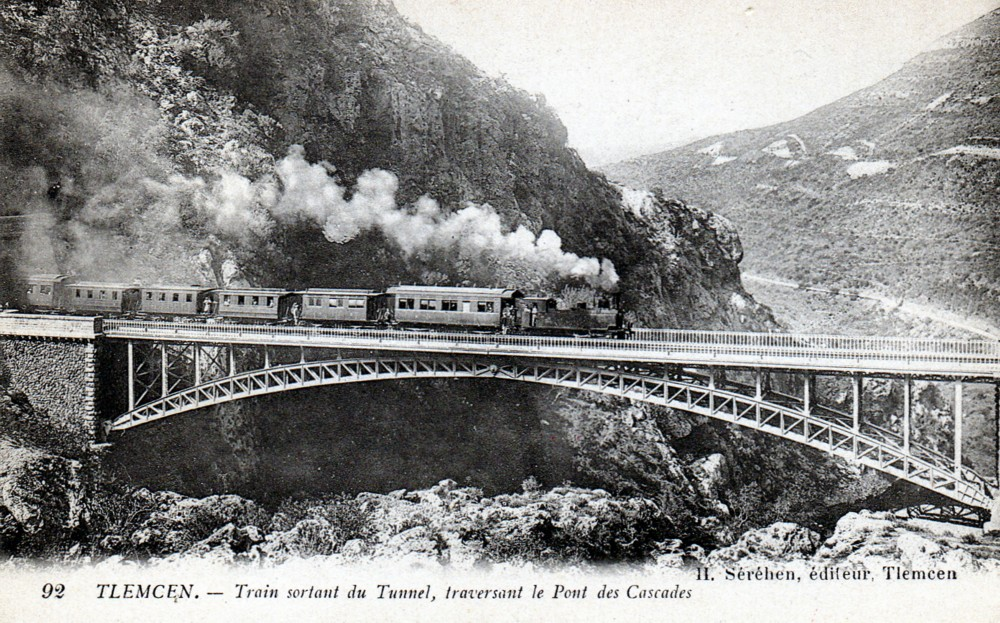
A train crossing the Pont des Cascades in Tlemcen, 1905

The Compagnie de l'Ouest algérien (OA) was a railway company created in 1881 to build and operate a network in the Department of Oran.

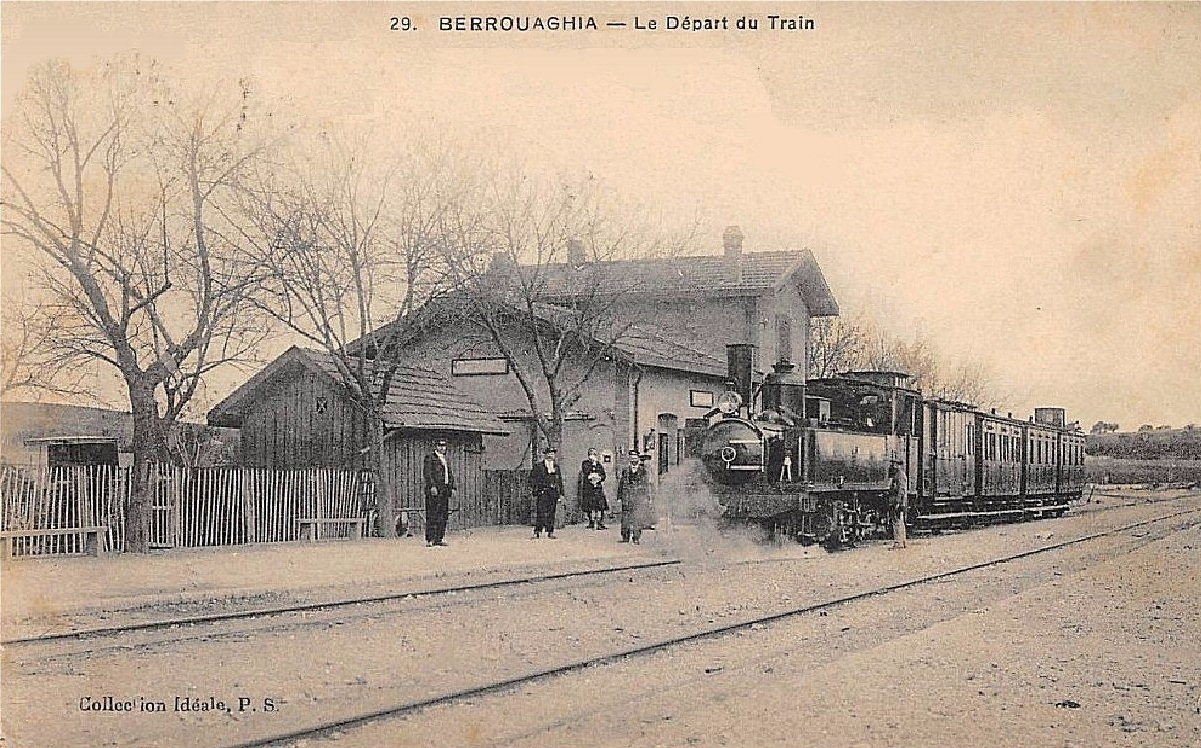
A train at Berrouaghia station with a 130t locomotive, series 1 to 9.

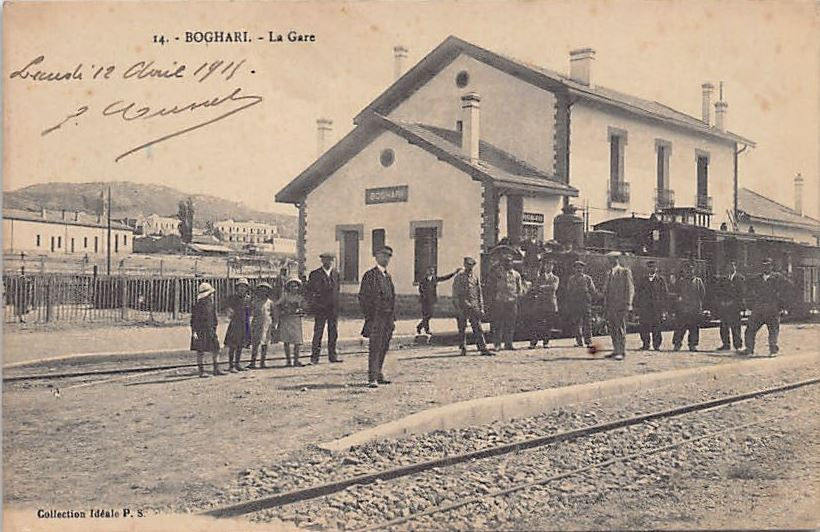
A train at Boghari station.

In 1913, the total length of the network was 449 km.

The lines are of standard gauge, except for the Blida to Djelfa line, which is of narrow gauge, built at a gauge of 1055 mm.

The Compagnie de l'Ouest algérien was integrated into the Compagnie des chemins de fer de Paris à Lyon et à la Méditerranée by decree of 31 December 1920.

== Lines ==
Conceded lines:

- Oran (la Senia) - Aïn Témouchent (75.5 km), opened in 1885, standard gauge,
- Oran (Sainte-Barbe du Tlélat) - Sidi-bel-Abbès - Tabia - Tlemcen (138.5 km), opened in 1890, standard gauge,
- Tabia - Raz-el-Ma - Crampel, (branched off the previous line) (69 km), opened in 1885, standard gauge,
- Blida - Berrouaghia (45 km), narrow gauge line, opened in 1891,
- Berrouaghia - Boghari (40 km), (extension of the previous line),(narrow gauge), opened on 15 July 1912,
- Boghari - Djelfa (155 km), (extension of the previous line),(narrow gauge), opened from 1916 to 1921.

Leased lines:

- Arzew - Aïn-Sefra (454 km), line initially conceded to the Compagnie franco-algérienne,
- Mostaganem - Tiaret (197 km), narrow gauge line, initially conceded to the Compagnie franco-algérienne.

== Rolling Stock ==
Narrow gauge locomotives (1055mm)

- No. 1 to 9, type 130t, delivered in 1891 by SACM, empty weight 29 tonnes, (narrow gauge)
- No. 20 to 24, type 140t, delivered in 1910 by Fives-Lille (narrow gauge)
- No. 101 to 114, type 230, delivered in 1913 by Fives-Lille (narrow gauge)
- No. 115 to 125, type 230, delivered in 1920 by Fives-Lille (narrow gauge)

Standard gauge locomotives (1435mm)

- No. 100 to 106, type 030, delivered in 1882 by Fives-Lille
- No. 107 to 111, type 030, delivered in 1887 by Fives-Lille
- No. 112 to 115, type 030, delivered in 1889 by SACM
- No. 200 to 206, type 030, delivered in 1884 by Fives-Lille
- No. 207 to 209, type 030, delivered in 1887 by Fives-Lille
- No. 300 to 304, type 130, delivered in 1904 by Fives-Lille
- No. 400 to 404, type 130, delivered in 1911 by Fives-Lille
- No. 405 to 409, type 130, delivered in 1913 by Fives-Lille
