= Ras El Ma =

Ras El Ma is a community in at least two Northern African states:

- Ras El Ma or Ras Kebdana, Morocco
- Ras El Ma, Sidi Bel Abbès, Algeria
