= Highway A60 (Algeria) =

Road in Algeria

Penetrating Road of Mostaganem

Route information
- Length: 60 km (37 mi)

Major junctions
- North end: Mostaganem
- A3 in El Hamadna; N90A in Sidi Khettab; W13A in oued el kheir
- Southeast end: El Hamadna

Location
- Country: Algeria

Highway system
- Algerian highways

The A62 highway also called The Penetrating Road of Mostaganem is a 60 km (37 mi) long road with a 2x2 lane configuration.

It spans from Highway A3 to the center of the city of Mostaganem.

== Intersections ==
- 1: A3 in El Hamadna
- 2: N90A in Sidi Khettab
- 3: W13A in Oued El kheir
- 4: N11A (1st Ring Road of Mostaganem)
