= Chanzy =

Chanzy may refer to:

- Chanzy (instrument), a type of three-stringed Mongolian lute from the Tuvan Republic
- Chanzy, an alternative name for Sidi-Ali-Ben-Joub, Algeria, the possible location of ancient Castra Severiana
- Antoine Chanzy (1823–1883), French general
- French cruiser Chanzy, a French Navy cruiser in commission from 1894 to 1907
