= Tenezara =

Coordinates: 34°58′N 0°37′W

- Village
- Interactive map of Tenezara
- Country: Algeria
- Province: Sidi Bel Abbès Province
- Commune: Benachiba Chelia
- Time zone: UTC+1 (CET)

Tenezara is a village in Sidi Bel Abbès Province in north-western Algeria.
