= Éric Delétang =

French footballer (born 1966)

Éric Deletang
Personal information
- Full name: Éric Delétang
- Date of birth: 5 February 1966 (age 60)
- Place of birth: Sidi Bel Abbès, Algeria
- Height: 1.76 m (5 ft 9 1/2 in)
- Position: Midfielder

Senior career*
Years	Team	Apps	(Gls)
1983–1985	Chamois Niortais	29	(7)
1985–1988	Monaco	3	(0)
1988–1990	Martigues	66	(13)
1990–1991	Le Havre	28	(6)
1991–1993	Perpignan	46	(7)
1993–1995	Alès	58	(16)
1995–1997	Lorient	46	(5)
1997–1998	Angers	16	(3)
1998–2000	Rouen	17	(5)
- * Club domestic league appearances and goals

Éric Delétang (born 5 February 1966) is a former French professional footballer. He played as a midfielder. Currently Éric is the manager of the under 16 Jordanian football team.

== See also ==
- Football in France
- List of football clubs in France
