= Hassi Zehana =

Coordinates: 35°01′33″N 0°53′25″W

- Commune and town
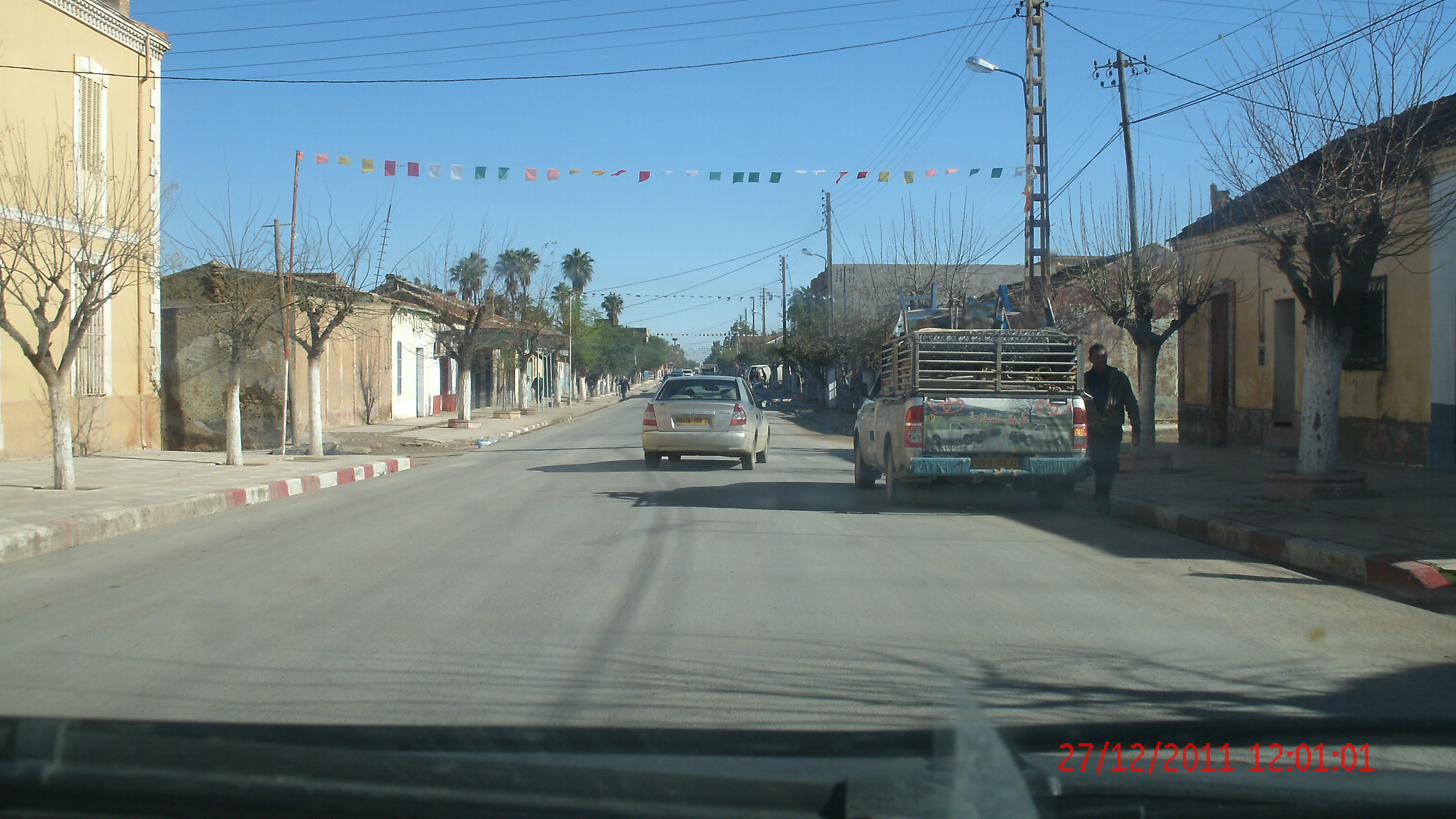
- Interactive map of Hassi Zehana
- Country: Algeria
- Province: Sidi Bel Abbès Province

Population (2008)
  - Total: 7,426
- Time zone: UTC+1 (CET)
- Postal code: 22330

Hassi Zahana (formerly known as Tassin during The French Empire) is a small town and commune in Sidi Bel Abbès Province in northwestern Algeria.

Located in the countryside, the town is surrounded by farms and large fields consisting mostly of wheat and olive trees.

The town was originally named after one Mr. Tassin, who stopped at the stagecoach relay of Hassi-Zehana in 1883.

== History ==
In 1883, a French official, Mr. Tassin, director of civil affairs for Admiral de Gueydon, travelling from Tlemcen to Sidi-Bel-Abbès, stopped at the stagecoach relay at Hassi-Zehana "Auberge du Roulage". This then included only a well dug by engineering, at the time of the conquest of 1830, a Moorish cafe (modest hut of brushwood) and "L'Auberge du roulage", the only European construction of the place.

=== Colonization center ===
After observing the stunning flatland that surrounded the location, the official reported his findings to the Governor of Algeria. In the subsequent year, he made the decision to establish a colonization center in that area, which eventually became known as Tassin.

The land was bought from the native owners and divided into 110 lots, of which 4 were granted to French people in Algeria and 65 to French people from mainland France from the Garonne, Massif Central and Rhône regions, including 9 families from the small mountain village of Hermillon.

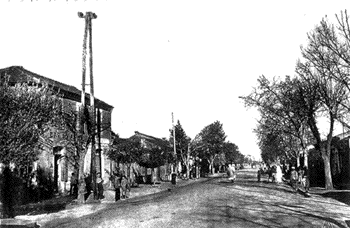
Tassin - Main Street

Creation of the village

Life in Hermillon was very difficult in the 1880s. Winters seemed to be endless, and harvests were uncertain. In 1888, Mr. Serain, the teacher, often listened to the complaints of fellow citizens when the inhabitants met at school in the evening after supper. The women talked about their household chores, and the men asked the teacher for advice. They complained about their fate, lamented the climate, and cursed the snow that covered the region and prevented them from picking up the grass essential for their dairy cows. The idea took shape, and one day in April 1889, Monsieur Serain and a resident of Hermillon set off in recognition of the other side of the Mediterranean. The concession requests having been accepted, 9 families (65 people including 26 adults and 39 children) from the village were designated for the settlement of Tassin. Leaving provisionally women and children, the men left on December 2, 1889. The teacher and his family joined them a few days later.

Arriving amidst torrential rain, the newcomers had to stay in gourbis and wooden huts. The following January, the Savoyards began to build their dwellings: four large yellow walls with a frame covered with tiles and a chimney in a corner, 8 meters long by 5 meters wide and 3.5 meters high. A unique piece that served as a kitchen, living room and bedroom.

They raised chickens and dairy goats behind the houses. The surrounding landscape featured holm oaks, jujube, carob, wild olive, and dwarf palm trees, which had to be cleared. This work was carried out by experienced Spanish charcoal burners. A beautiful red clay-limestone soil appeared, and cultivation began.

By 1895, Tassin had become a fully-fledged commune, and by 1900, there were over 200 houses. In the main street shaded by plane trees, shops opened their doors, and administrations began to set up. The 300 original settlers had become a thousand, and among them were 87 people from Hermillon.

== Places of interest ==
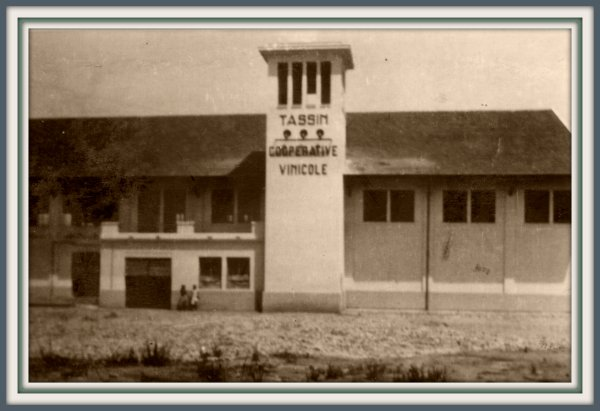
TASSIN-Old Wine factory.

=== Wine Factory (The cooperative cellar) ===
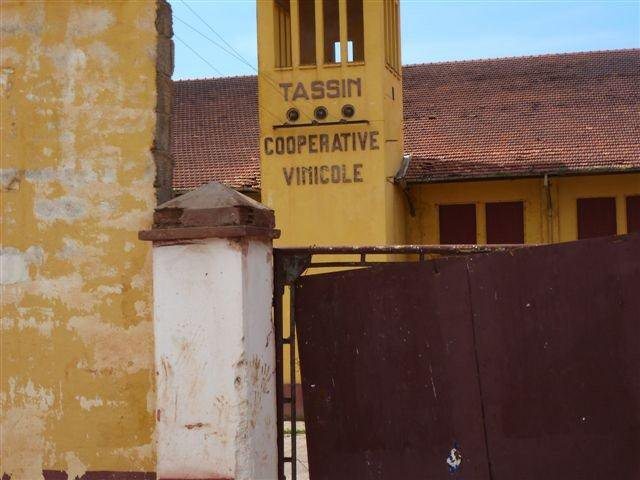
TASSIN-Wine factory now.

Probably one of the well-known places in town, the wine factory is essential to the town's history. This building is located near the west entrance.

The cooperative cellar was created in 1932. It had the particularity of being equipped with centrifugal pumps, which allow handling from 300 to 400 hecto-hours. It was particularly designed to make quality wine, thanks to the variety of grape types brought by them. Cooperative, local and fruity were the specialties of the region's wine. Its creation had allowed the storage and vinification of grapes belonging to winegrowers who did not have a personal cellar. Its capacity was 49,000 hectoliters.
