= Sidi Bel Abbès Province =

Province of Algeria

Sidi Bel Abbès Province ولاية سيدي بلعباس
- Province
- Map of Algeria highlighting Sidi Bel Abbès
- Coordinates: 35°12′N 0°38′W
- Country: Algeria
- Capital: Sidi Bel Abbès

Government
  - PPA president: Mr. M’Kelkel Bouziane (FLN)
  - Wāli: Mr. Samir Chibani

Area
  - Total: 9,150.63 km^{2} (3,533.08 sq mi)

Population (2008)
  - Total: 603,369
  - Density: 65.9374/km^{2} (170.777/sq mi)
- Time zone: UTC+01 (CET)
- Area Code: +213 (0) 48
- ISO 3166 code: DZ-22
- Districts: 15
- Municipalities: 52

Sidi Bel Abbès (Arabic: ولاية سيدي بلعباس) is one of the provinces (wilayas) of Algeria, situated in the northwestern part of the country. Its name is derived from the name of its capital, the city of Sidi Bel Abbès.

== History ==
Sidi Bel Abbès's location, climate, topography and water sources have attracted many immigrants through history; the region has also been subjected to many foreign invasions. The Romans used the region as a military refuge, leaving behind their influence in architecture. Starting at the end of the 5th century, the indigenous population experienced Byzantine domination, to which they responded with almost constant rebellion and attempts at revolution.

This continued until the Islamic conquests at the end of the 7th century, which were welcomed by the Berber tribes, who appreciated the message of equality in Islam. Major population growth occurred in the 11th Century. The emergence of the Almoravid dynasty in the region led to the unification of the Maghreb. This dynasty was overthrown by the Almoahidin in the 12th Century, and in the 13th Century, the unified Maghreb region was split into the domains of three different families. Sidi Bel Abbès eventually fell under the control of the Zayanites, ruled by their founder Ighmrasin bin Zayan, who united the Hilal tribes.

The province of Sidi Bel Abbès was created from Oran (department) in 1974. In 1984, Aïn Témouchent Province was carved out of its territory.

== Geographical features ==
Lake Sidi Mohamed Benali is located in Sidi Bel Abbès Province, within the commune of Aïn Tindamine.

== Administrative divisions ==
The province is divided into 15 districts (daïras), which are further divided into 52 communes or municipalities.

=== Districts ===
1. Aïn El Berd
2. Ben Badis
3. Marhoum
4. Mérine
5. Mostefa Ben Brahim
6. Moulay Slissen
7. Ras El Ma
8. Sfisef
9. Sidi Ali Benyoub
10. Sidi Ali Boussidi
11. Sidi Bel Abbès
12. Sidi Lahcène
13. Télagh
14. Ténira
15. Téssala
16. amirnas

=== Communes ===
1. Aïn Adden
2. Aïn El Berd
3. Aïn Kada
4. Aïn Thrid
5. Aïn Tindamine
6. Amarnas
7. Badredine El Mokrani
8. Belarbi
9. Ben Badis
10. Benachiba Chelia
11. Bir El Hammam
12. Boudjebaa El Bordj
13. Boukhanafis
14. Chettouane Belaila
15. Dhaya
16. El Hacaiba
17. Hassi Dahou
18. Hassi Zehana
19. Lamtar
20. Makedra
21. Marhoum
22. M'Cid
23. Merine
24. Mezaourou
25. Mostefa Ben Brahim
26. Moulay Slissen
27. Oued Sebaa
28. Oued Sefioun
29. Oued Taourira
30. Ras El Ma
31. Redjem Demouche
32. Sehala Thaoura
33. Sfissef
34. Sidi Ali Benyoub
35. Sidi Ali Boussidi
36. Sidi Bel Abbès
37. Sidi Brahim
38. Sidi Chaib
39. Sidi Dahou el Zairs
40. Sidi Hamadouche
41. Sidi Khaled
42. Sidi Lahcene
43. Sidi Yacoub
44. Tabya (Tabla)
45. Tafissour
46. Taoudmout
47. Teghalimet
48. Telagh
49. Tenezara
50. Tenira
51. Tessala
52. Tilmouni
53. Zerouala
