= Sidi Bel Abbès Airport =

- IATA: BFW; ICAO: DAOS

Summary
- Airport type: Public
- Serves: Sidi Bel Abbès, Algeria
- Elevation AMSL: 492 m (1,614 ft)
- Coordinates: 35°10′20″N 000°35′41″W

Map
- Location of the airport in Algeria

Runways
Direction	Length		Surface
Direction	m	ft	Surface
10L/28R	1,484	4,869	Asphalt
- Sources: WAD, GCM, STV Google Maps

Sidi Bel Abbès Airport (IATA: BFW, ICAO: DAOS), is an airport located 4 kilometres (2.5 mi) southeast of Sidi Bel Abbès, Algeria.
