= Lake Sidi Mohamed Benali =

Lake in Sidi Bel Abbès Province, Morocco

Lake Sidi Mohamed Ben Ali
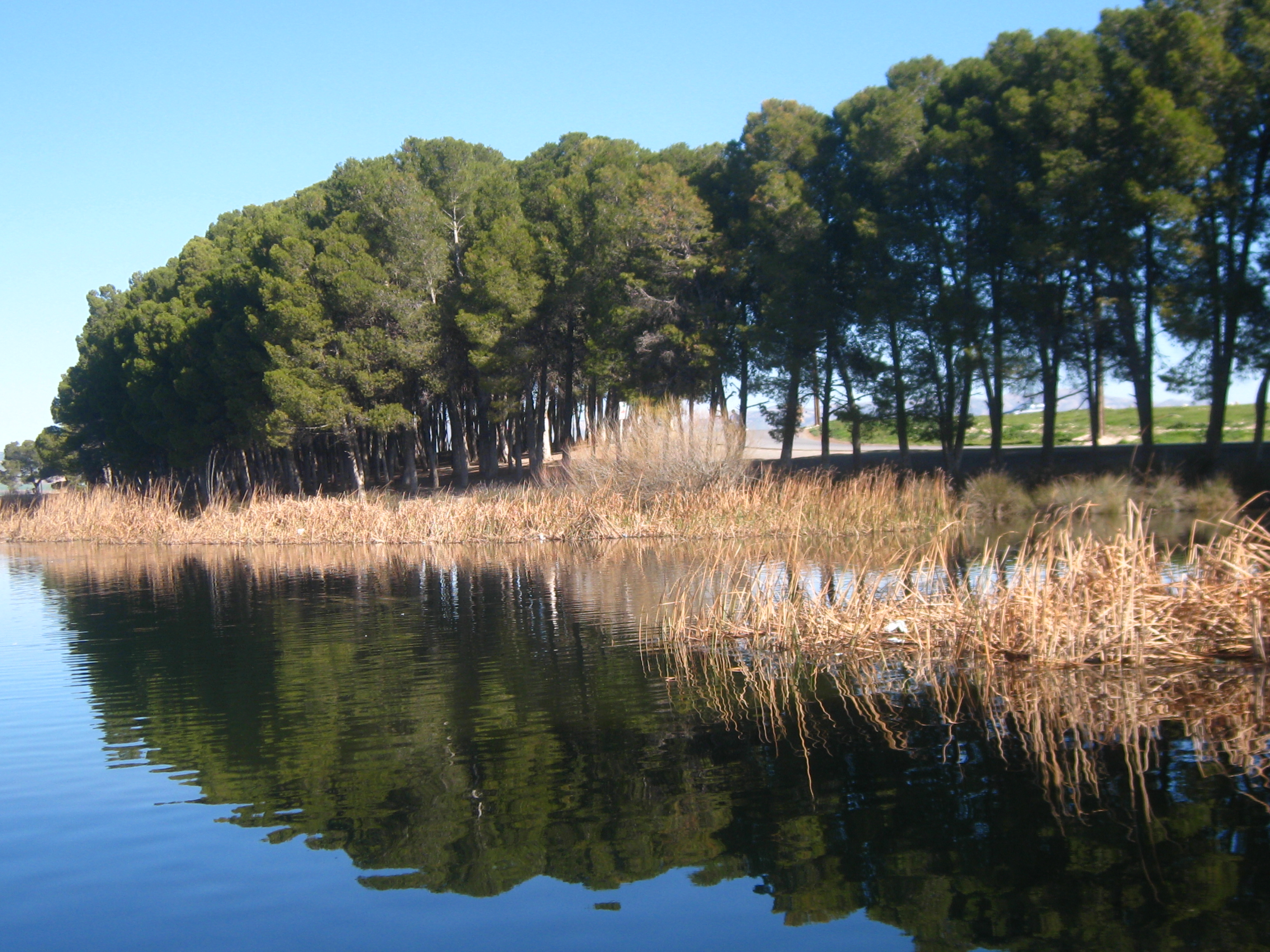
- Interactive map of Lake Sidi Mohamed Ben Ali
- Coordinates: 35°14′33″N 0°38′51″W
- Type: Lake
- Basin countries: Algeria
- Built: 1940s
- Max. length: 0.748 km (0.465 mi)
- Surface area: 0.5 km^{2} (0.19 sq mi)
- Average depth: 30 m (98 ft)
- Water volume: 3 km^{3} (1 cu mi)
- Surface elevation: 456 m (1,496 ft)

Lake Sidi Mohamed Benali is a lake located in western Algeria, within the Sidi Bel Abbès Province, specifically on the lands of Ain Thrid municipality, approximately 1.7 kilometers from the city of Sidi Bel Abbès and near the East–West Highway.

The lake covers an area of over 35 hectares, is surrounded by diverse floral vegetation, and provides a natural habitat for 26 species of water birds, fish, and various wildlife, including wolves, domestic cats, and hedgehogs.

The lake is entirely man-made, created during the 1940s, and fed by the flow of the Sig River and Sarno Valley. It was constructed to manage the floodwaters of the Mekerra River, thus mitigating the risk of destructive floods that used to threaten the city of Sidi Bel Abbès.

The lake occupies a natural basin carved into sedimentary terrain, which is sealed downstream by an earthen dam. The lake bed prevents water seepage due to sediment deposition, and its maximum depth reaches approximately 30 meters.

Recent (2022) research at the lake suggests that rising temperatures adversely affect the food chain in the lake by reducing the number of zooplankton.

== See also ==
- Chott Tinsilt
- Dhaya
- Sabkha Zamoul.
- Ben Aknoun Forest
- Bachdjerrah Forest
