= Djillali Liabès University of Sidi Bel Abbès =

Public research institution in Sidi Bel Abbes, Algeria

- Type: Public university
- Established: 1989
- Rector: Pr. BOUZIANI MERAHI (April 2023)
- Academic staff: 1,480 (2022)
- Students: 28,900 (2022)
- Location: Sidi Bel Abbès, Algeria; 35.179°N 0.660°W
- Website: http://www.univ-sba.dz/

The Djillali Liabès University of Sidi Bel Abbès is a public university located in Sidi Bel Abbès, Algeria.

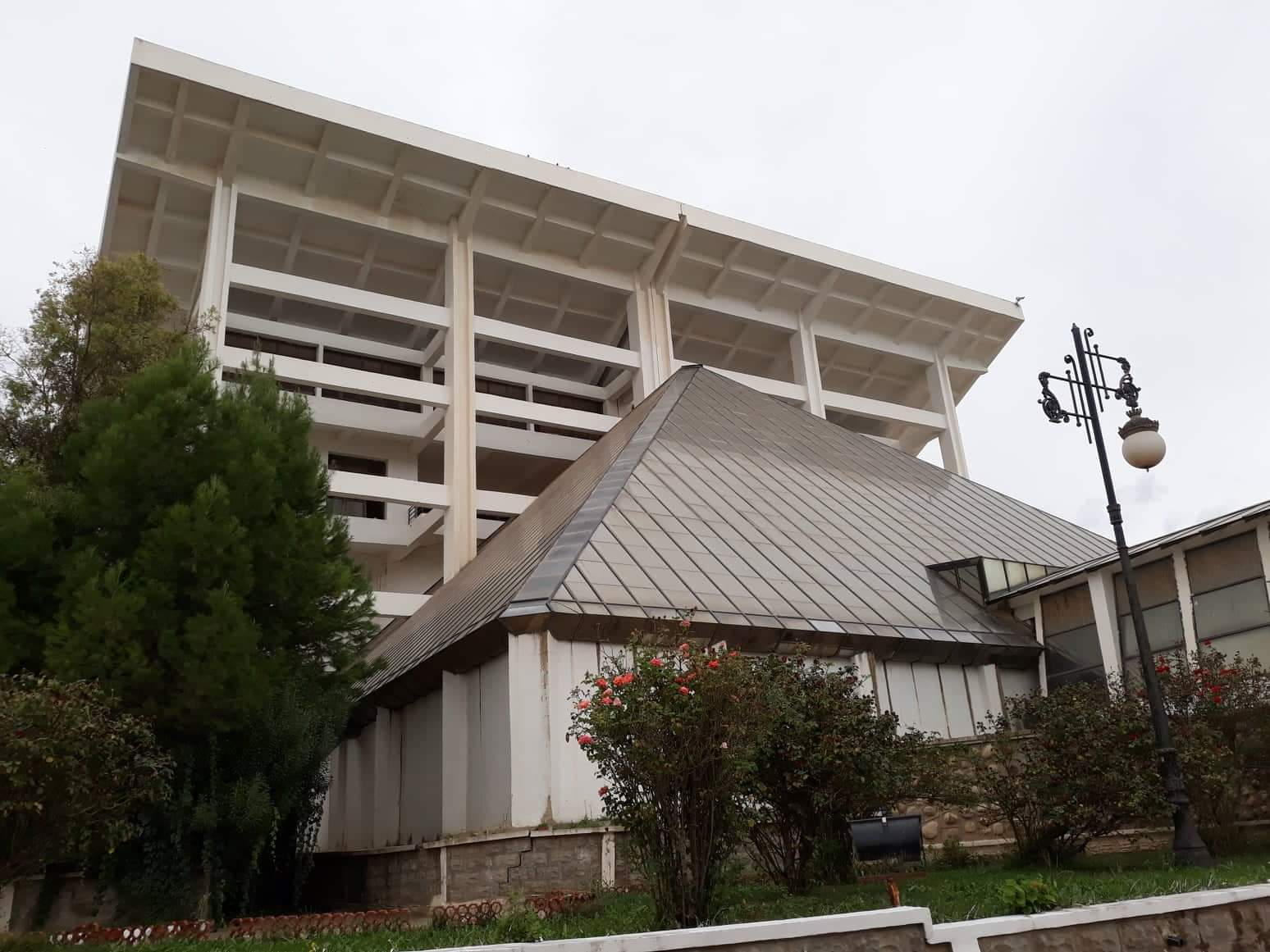

== History ==
The University Djillali Liabès was established on August 1, 1989. Its development spans over twenty years, during which it was continually expanded. Before achieving university status, the institution operated under various statuses:

- University Center status: From the establishment's opening in September 1978 to August 1984.
- National Institutes of Higher Education (INES) status: From August 1984 to July 1989.

== Overview ==
The university of Sidi Bel Abbès gained university status in 1989, having previously been a university center since 1978. The university comprises various campuses surrounding the city. It includes six faculties: Sciences, Law, Engineering Sciences, Medicine, Economic Sciences, and Human Sciences, spread across nine sites. The university had 15,000 students in the academic year 2000/2001 and 22,000 students in 2005.

=== University in Numbers ===
Designation	Number	Observation
Faculties	06	
University Sites	10 (23,700 PP)	06 Faculties, 01 Rectorate, 01 Campus, 01 Research Center, 01 Central Library
Students	33,069	Including 5,503 LMD system students and 1,977 postgraduate students
Graduated Students	4,089	Including 3,699 in the Classical system, 117 in LMD, and 273 postgraduates
Permanent Faculty	959	Including 244 senior faculty
ATS Staff	729	Including 310 administrative staff
University Residences	14 (14,700 beds)	19,358 residents including 9,182 females

=== University Development from 1998 to 2008 ===
	1999	2004	2008
Pedagogical Capacity	6,260	16,300	23,700
Housing Capacity	6,000	9,424	14,700

=== Projections 2009–2014 ===
	2009	2014
Student Population Growth	37,069	52,069
Faculty Growth	1,080	1,580
Pedagogical Capacity	30,700	40,700
Theoretical Housing Capacity	19,700	24,700

== Ranking ==
It was ranked 62nd in the 2016 regional ranking of Arab universities by U.S. News & World Report.
