= Sidi Hamadouche =

Coordinates: 35°17′57″N 0°32′56″W

Sidi Hamadouche سيدي حمادوش
- Commune and town
- Interactive map of Sidi Hamadouche
- Country: Algeria
- Province: Sidi Bel Abbès Province
- Time zone: UTC+1 (CET)

Sidi Hamadouche ( Arabic: سيدي حمادوش) is a community in the Algerian province Sidi Bel Abbès with 9,264 inhabitants in 1998.

Near Sidi Hamadouche, there is a large medium wave broadcasting, station, which transmits the program of "Chaîne 1" on 549 kHz with 600 kW. One of the three masts of the facility, which is situated at 35°17'16N 000°34'57W is 270 metres tall and is among the tallest manmade structures in Algeria.
