= Sidi Ali Benyoub =

Coordinates: 34°56′44″N 0°43′10″W

Sidi Ali Benyoub سيدي علي بن يوب
- Commune and town
- Interactive map of Sidi Ali Benyoub
- Country: Algeria
- Province: Sidi Bel Abbès Province
- Time zone: UTC+1 (CET)
- Postal code: 2246

Sidi Ali Benyoub is a town and commune in Sidi Bel Abbès Province in north-western Algeria. It is located at 34°56'44"N, 0°43'10"W. between Tabia and Mezaourou.

It is also known as Chanzy, with reference to Alfred Chanzy, French settler who was the first to settle there.
