= Highway A62 (Algeria) =

Road in Algeria

A62 autoroute
- Penetrating Road of Oran
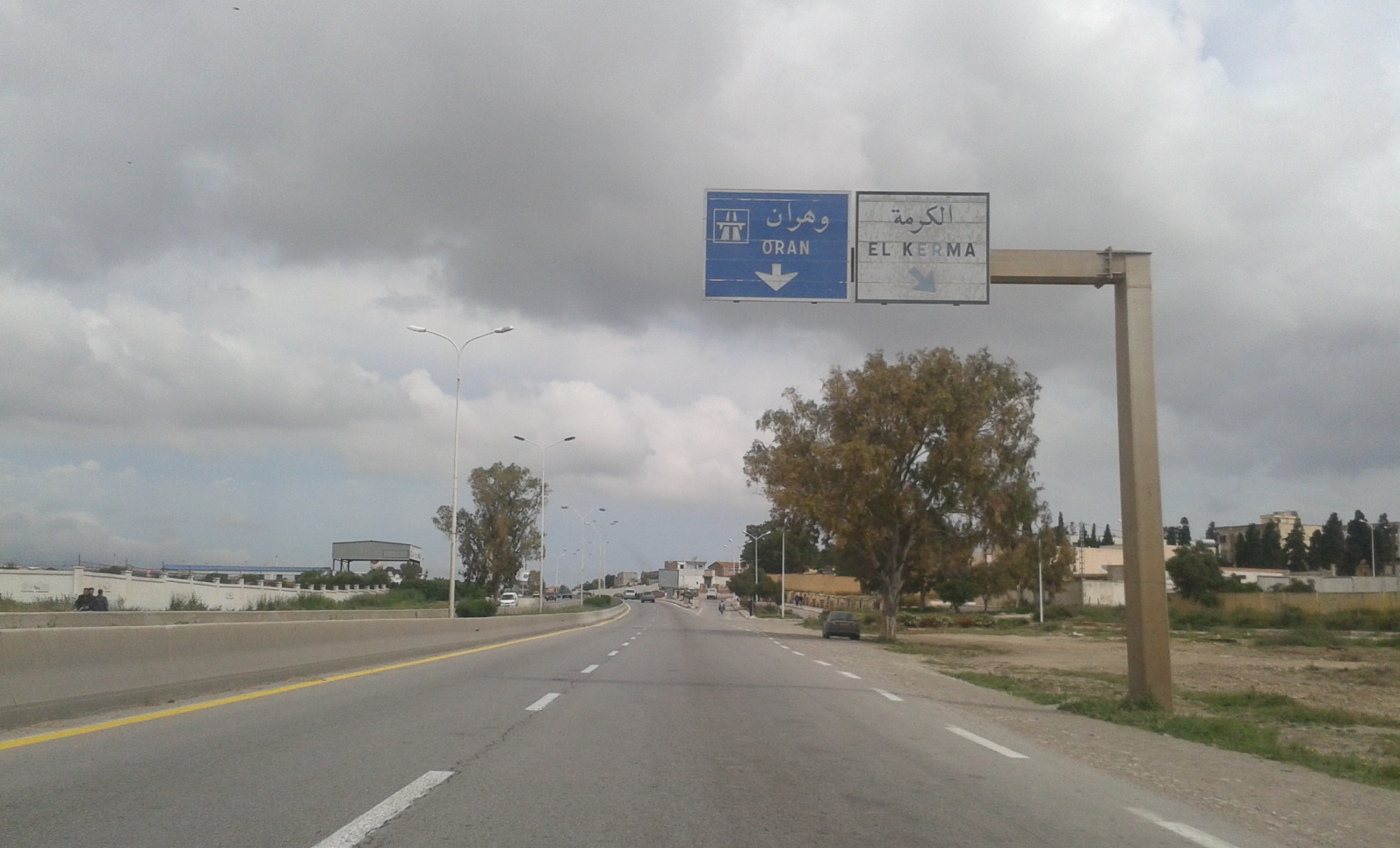

Route information
- Length: 24 km (15 mi)

Major junctions
- North end: El kerma
- A3 in Zahana; N13 an N4 in Oued Tlelat; N108 and W50 in El Hamoul; 2nd Ring Road of Oran; 1st Ring Road of Oran
- Southwest end: A3

Location
- Country: Algeria

Highway system
- Algerian highways

The A62 highway also called The Penetrating Road of Oran is a 24-kilometre-long (15 mi) road with a 2x3 lane configuration. It spans from Highway A3 to El Kerma. It starts in the city of Zahana and ends in El Kerma going through the wilaya's biggest industrial zones. It has a speed limit of 120 kilometres per hour (75 mph) with a few exceptions in dangerous roads it gets lowered to 100 kilometres per hour (62 mph). It is supposed to be extended to the Port of Oran through the ring road.

== Intersections ==
- 1: A3
- 2: N4
- 3: N108 and W50
- 4: RR2 of Oran
- 5: RR1 of Oran
