= M'Cid =

Coordinates: 35°08′18″N 0°14′46″W

- Commune and town
- Interactive map of M'Cid
- Country: Algeria
- Province: Sidi Bel Abbès Province
- Time zone: UTC+1 (CET)

M'Cid is a town and commune in Sidi Bel Abbès Province in northwestern Algeria.
