= Sidi Bel Abbès District =

Coordinates: 35.1939°N 0.6414°W

Sid Bel Abbès District is an important region in north-western Algeria which plays host to many communes and towns in its geographic location.

The district is further divided into 1 municipalities:

- Sidi Bel Abbès

== See also ==
- Sidi Bel Abbès
