= Mostefa Ben Brahim, Sidi Bel Abbès =

Coordinates: 35°11′33″N 0°21′30″W

Mostefa Ben Brahim
- Commune and town
- Country: Algeria
- Province: Sidi Bel Abbès Province
- Time zone: UTC+1 (CET)

Mostefa Ben Brahim is a town and commune in Sidi Bel Abbès Province in northwestern Algeria.
