= Marie-Louise Belarbi =

French-Moroccan bookseller, publisher, and writer (1928–2020)

Marie-Louise Belarbi (1928–28 May 2020) was a French-Moroccan bookseller, publisher, editor, and writer. Born in France, she spent most of her life in Morocco, where she established a popular bookstore, Carrefour des Livres, as well as a publishing house for French, Moroccan and Maghreb literature. She published works by several notable writers, including Françoise Sagan, Tahar Ben Jelloun, Driss Chraïbi, Abdellah Taïa and others. She also wrote two books, a novel and a memoir. In 2001, she was awarded the distinction of an officer of the French Ordre des Arts et des Lettres for her contributions to publishing and literature.

== Biography ==
She was born Marie-Louise Guibal in 1928, in Montpellier and moved to Morocco, following her marriage, dividing her time between Rabat and Casablanca. She married Abdelkader Belarbi, a Moroccan government official who worked in Morocco's Ministry of Education and Ministry of Industry. They had three children: Myriam Belarbi, Mounia Belarbi (a journalist), and Malek Belarbi (a musician). She died on 20 May 2020 at age 91, following a prolonged illness.

== Career ==
Belarbi initially worked at Éditions Julliard, a French publisher in Paris, and accepted Françoise Sagan's first book, Bonjour tristesse for publication, convincing René Julliard to read the book and publish it. She met and married her husband, Abdelkader Belarbi, a Moroccan government official, and moved with him to Morocco, where she initially worked as a school teacher.

In 1984, she established Carrefour des Livres, a bookstore in the Maârif area of Casablanca, and along with actor Bichr Bennani, created the Tarik Publishing House to publish writing from Morocco and the Maghreb. Carrefour des Livres was a notable institution in Morocco, and according to Le Desk, "....symbolized the cultural and intellectual life" of Casablanca. The bookstore hosted readings, conferences, and events featuring African and French authors, including Rachid Mimouni, Abraham Serfaty, Yasmina Khadra, Guy Bedos, and Frédéric Beigbeder. Tarik Publishing House published early works by several well-known African and French authors, including Tahar Ben Jelloun, Driss Chraïbi, Abdellah Taïa, Christine Daure-Serfaty and Ahmed Marzouki. Tarik Publishing House was notable for publishing several prison memoirs, including Ahmed Marzouki's On affame bien les rats.

From 1986 to 1990, Belarbi hosted a television program on literature titled Plaisir de Lire on SNRT's Chaîne Inter channel. She was the director of the Coup de Soleil, a literary association, in Morocco, and in 1994, was one of the founders of the Maghreb Book Fair, which is held in Paris every year and hosts over a hundred authors. In 1999, she was a founder of a publishing association, the Association for the Promotion of Publishing, Books and Reading (APELL) in Morocco.

Belarbi wrote two books: a novel, titled Ligne brisée (tr. Broken Line, Zellige 2013), and a memoir titled Soixante ans de passion pour le livre.

== Awards and honors ==
In 2001, Belarbi was awarded the position of an officer of the Ordre des Arts et des Lettres for her contributions to publishing and literature.
