= Sidi Lahcene =

Sidi Lahcene سيدي لحسن
- Commune and town
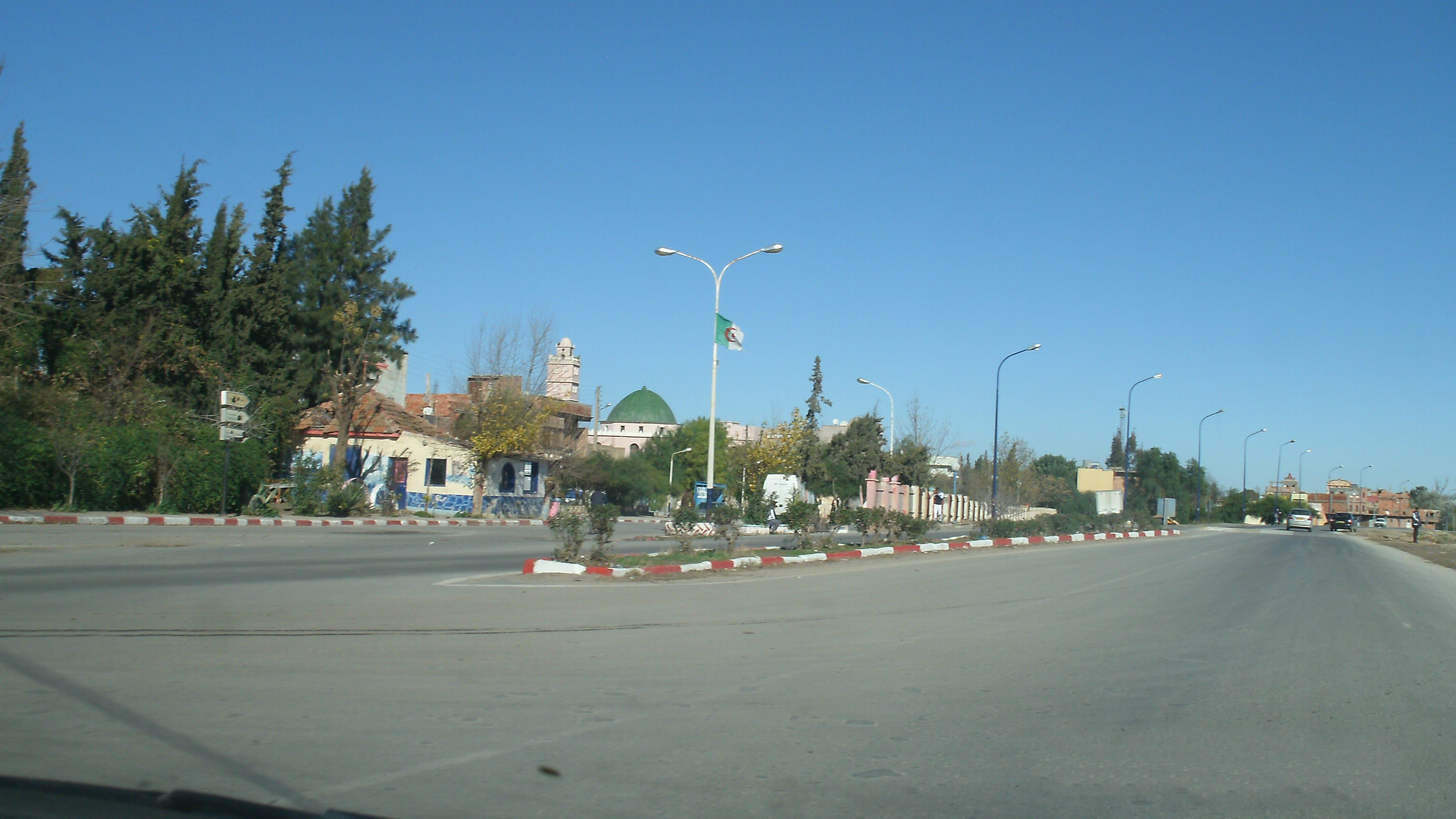
- Sidi Lahcene

- Location within Algeria
- Coordinates: 35.1632838°N 0.6959152°W
- Country: Algeria
- Province: Sidi Bel Abbès Province
- District: Sidi Lahcène District

Population (2008)
  - Total: 20,999
- Time zone: UTC+1 (CET)

Sidi Lahcene (Arabic: سيدي لحسن) is a town and commune in Sidi Bel Abbès Province in north-western Algeria.
