= Makedra =

Coordinates: 35°26′27″N 0°25′53″W

- Commune and town
- Interactive map of Makedra
- Country: Algeria
- Province: Sidi Bel Abbès Province
- Time zone: UTC+1 (CET)

Makedra is a town and commune in Sidi Bel Abbès Province in northwestern Algeria.
