= Lamtar =

Lamtar لمطار
- Commune and town
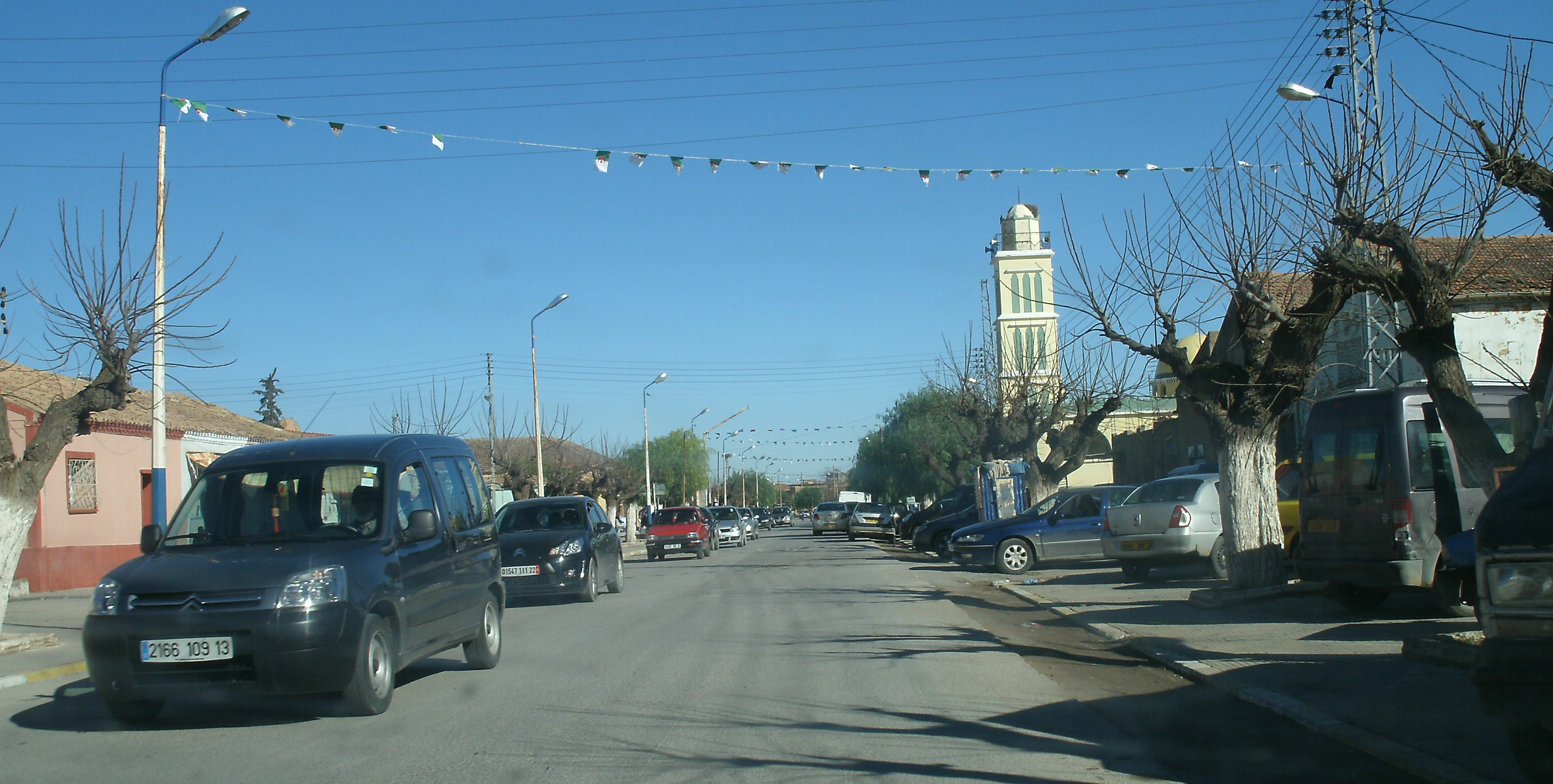

- Location within Algeria
- Coordinates: 35.070627°N 0.79814°W
- Country: Algeria
- Province: Sidi Bel Abbès Province

Population (2008)
  - Total: 7,530
- Time zone: UTC+1 (CET)

Lamtar is a town and commune in Sidi Bel Abbès Province in northwestern Algeria.
