= Amarnas =

Coordinates: 35°08′08″N 0°37′22″W

- Commune and town
- Interactive map of Amarnas
- Country: Algeria
- Province: Sidi Bel Abbès Province
- Time zone: UTC+1 (CET)

Amarnas is a town and commune in Sidi Bel Abbès Province in northwestern Algeria.
