= Aïcha Belarbi =

Moroccan diplomat

- عائشة بلعربي
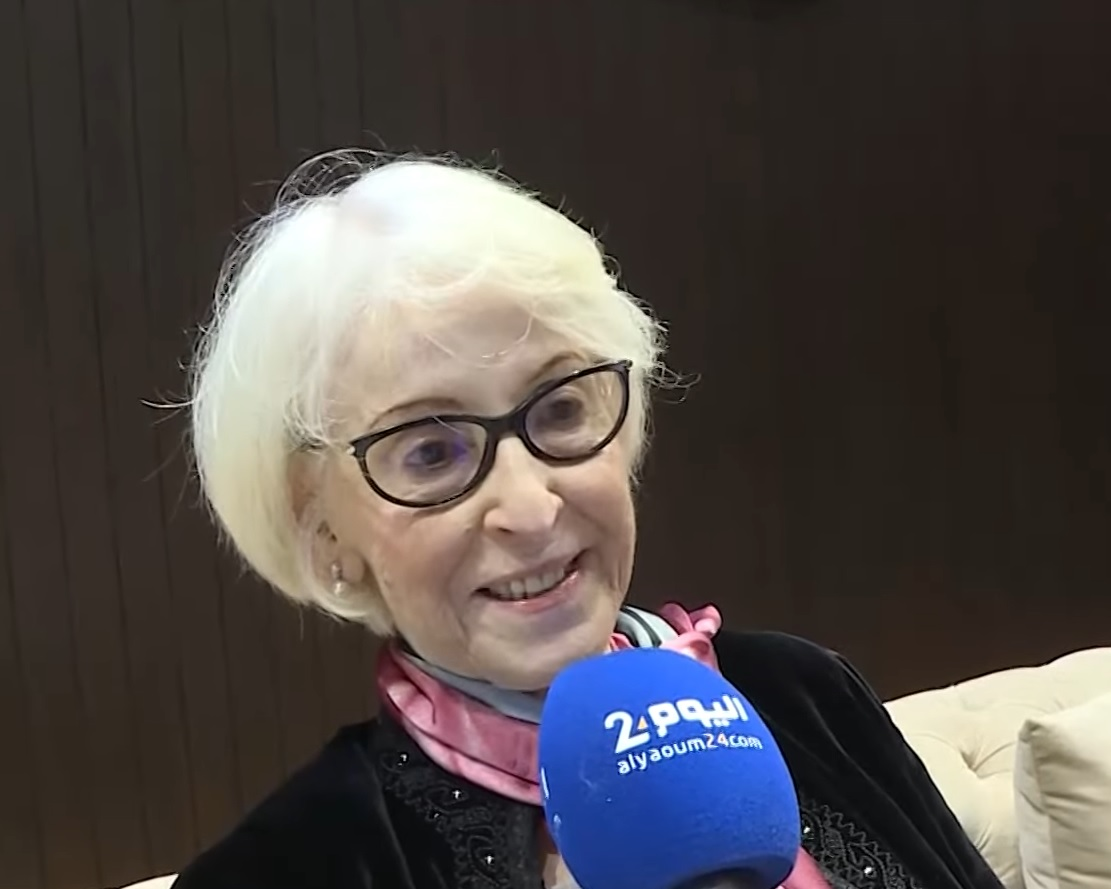
- Born: 1946 (age 79–80); Salé, Morocco
- Education: Paris 8 University
- Occupations: Sociologist; Diplomat; Women's rights activist; Politician; Professor
- Employer: Mohammed V University
- Known for: Women's rights advocacy and diplomacy
- Office: Secretary of State for Foreign Affairs in charge of Cooperation
- Political party: Socialist Union of Popular Forces

Aïcha Belarbi (born 1946) is a Moroccan sociologist, women's rights activist and diplomat. She was ambassador to the European Union from 2000 to 2008.

== Life ==
Aïcha Belarbi was born in Salé in 1946. She became an activist in the Association of Women of the Mediterranean Region (AWMR).

From 1998 to 2000 she was Secretary of State of Foreign Affairs in charge of Co-operation. In 2000 she was appointed Ambassador to the European Union.

== Works ==
- (ed.) Couples en question / Azwāj wa-tasāʼulāt, Casablanca: Editions Le Fennec, 1990
- Le salaire de madame, Casablanca: Editions Le Fennec, 1991
- (ed.) Femmes rurales / Nisāh qarawiyāt (Rural women), Casablanca: Editions Le Fennec, 1995
