= Oued Sebaa =

- Commune and town
- Location in Algeria
- Coordinates: 34°35′12″N 0°42′32″W
- Country: Algeria
- Province: Sidi Bel Abbès Province
- Time zone: UTC+1 (CET)

Oued Sebaa is a town and commune in Sidi Bel Abbès Province in northwestern Algeria.
