= Redjem Demouche =

Coordinates: 34°25′38″N 0°48′35″W

Redjem Demouche رجم دموش
- Commune and town
- Interactive map of Redjem Demouche
- Country: Algeria
- Province: Sidi Bel Abbès Province
- Time zone: UTC+1 (CET)

Redjem Demouche (Arabic: رجم دموش) is a town and commune in Sidi Bel Abbès Province in north-western Algeria.
