= Zerouala =

Coordinates: 35°15′N 0°31′W

- Commune and town
- Interactive map of Zerouala
- Country: Algeria
- Province: Sidi Bel Abbès Province
- Time zone: UTC+1 (CET)

Zerouala is a town and commune in Sidi Bel Abbès Province in north-western Algeria.
