= Ras El Ma, Sidi Bel Abbès =

Ras El Ma رأس الماء
- Commune and town

- Location within Algeria
- Coordinates: 34.4973612°N 0.8195114°W
- Country: Algeria
- Province: Sidi Bel Abbès Province
- District: Ras El Ma District
- APC: 2012-2017

Government
  - Type: Municipality
  - Mayor: Guendouzi Slimane (FLN)

Population (2008)
  - Total: 18,644
- Time zone: UTC+1 (CET)

Ras El Ma is a town and commune in Sidi Bel Abbès Province in north-western Algeria.
