= Tenira =

- Commune and town
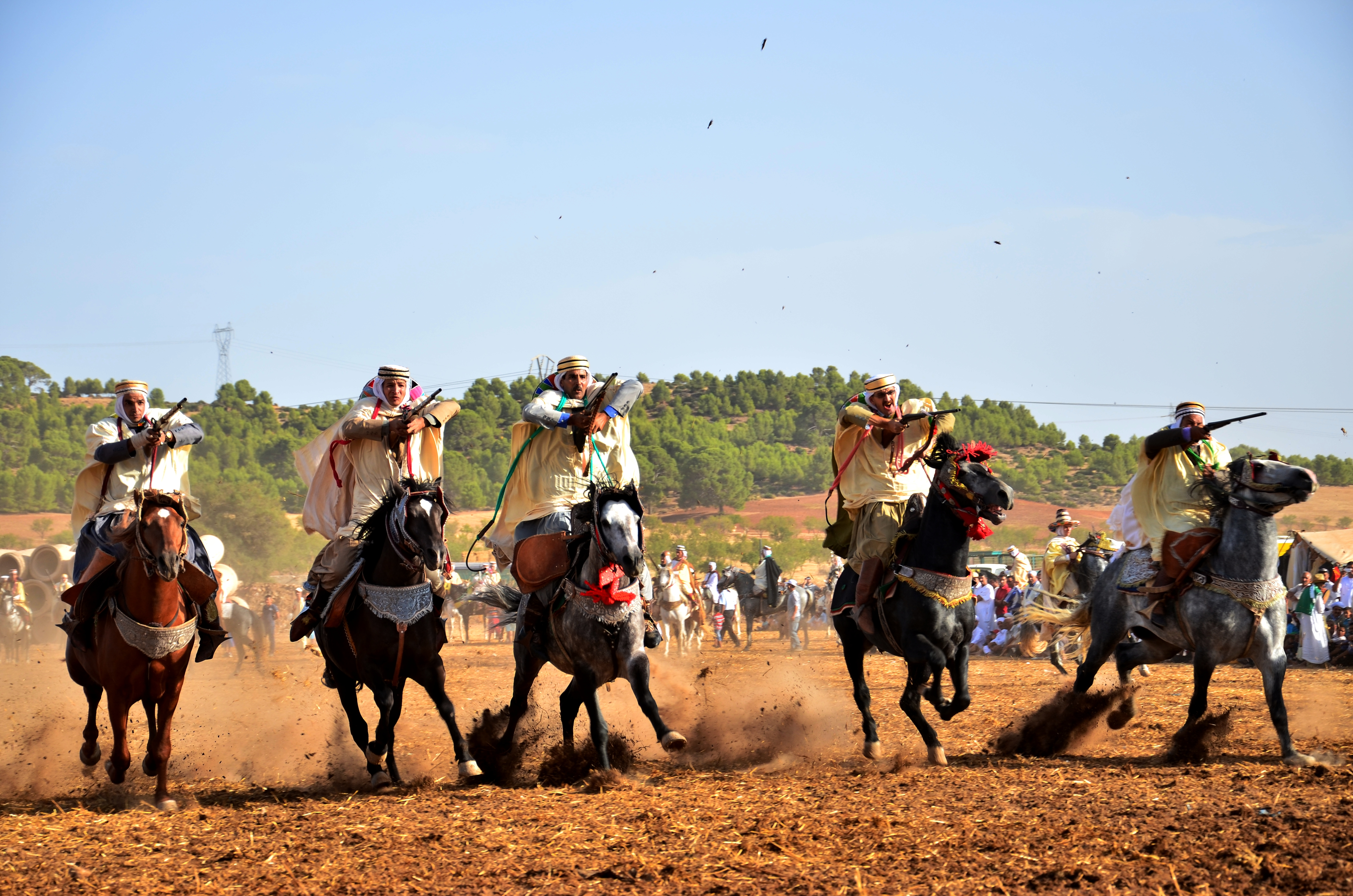

- Location within Algeria
- Country: Algeria
- Province: Sidi Bel Abbès Province
- Time zone: UTC+1 (CET)

Tenira is a town and commune in Sidi Bel Abbès Province in north-western Algeria.
