= Badredine El Mokrani =

- Commune and town

- Location within Algeria
- Coordinates: 35°0′32″N 0°51′0″W
- Country: Algeria
- Province: Sidi Bel Abbès Province
- Time zone: UTC+1 (CET)

Badredine El Mokrani is a town and commune in Sidi Bel Abbès Province in northwestern Algeria.
