= Sidi Dahou el Zairs =

Coordinates: 35°06′59″N 0°54′35″W

- Commune and town
- Interactive map of Sidi Dahou el Zairs
- Country: Algeria
- Province: Sidi Bel Abbès Province
- Time zone: UTC+1 (CET)

Sidi Dahou el Zairs is a town and commune in Sidi Bel Abbès Province in north-western Algeria.
