= Marhoum =

Coordinates: 34°27′N 0°12′W

- Commune and town
- Interactive map of Marhoum
- Country: Algeria
- Province: Sidi Bel Abbès Province
- Time zone: UTC+1 (CET)

Marhoum is a town and commune in Sidi Bel Abbès Province in northwestern Algeria.
