= Aïn El Berd =

Aïn El Berd عين البرد Oued Imbert
- Commune
- Location of Aïn El Berd within Sidi Bel Abbès Province

- Location of Aïn El Berd within Algeria
- Coordinates: 35°21′57″N 0°30′46″W
- Country: Algeria
- Province (Wilaya): Sidi Bel Abbès
- District (Daïra): Aïn El Berd
- Commune Established: April 15, 1886

Area
  - Total: 84 km^{2} (32 sq mi)
- Elevation: 486 m (1,594 ft)

Population (2008)
  - Total: 16,013
  - Density: 190.6/km^{2} (494/sq mi)
- Time zone: UTC+1 (CET)
- Postal codes: 22022, 22057
- Area code: 48

Aïn El Berd is a commune (baladiyah) in the Aïn El Berd district (daïra) in the Sidi Bel Abbès province (wilayah) of Algeria. It is situated in the northwestern part of the country, in the Hauts Plateaux region, and has a typical Mediterranean climate. Established as an official commune on April 15, 1886, Aïn El Berd is known for its beautiful countryside views and sites, as well as for its vineyards, olive trees, and wheat products. During the French colonial era, the surrounding areas, then called Saint-Marc and Saint-Henri, gave wines of good quality, and in 1889 and 1900 won silver and gold medals, respectively.

== Settlements ==
Aïn El Berd Commune consists of two main settlements:

- Aïn El Berd - with a population of 12,179 is the capital of Aïn El Berd commune. The colonial name was "Oued-Imbert", which is a contraction of its name Oued Aïn El Berd. Before the French colonial era, Aïn El Berd was inhabited by the tribe of Ouled Sidi Ma'âchou. It is situated 25 km from Sidi Bel Abbès and 57 km from Oran on national highway N13.
- Ouled Ali - population of 3,487.

== Demographics ==
During the French colonial era, the area around Aïn El Berd from Oran to Sidi Bel Abbès was heavily populated with French colonists, sometimes referred to as Pied-Noir. After the massacre of Pieds-Noirs in Oran by the suburban Muslim population in which European people were shot, molested and brought to Petit-Lac slaughterhouse where they were tortured and executed, the Pied-Noir exodus began in earnest. By September 1962, cities such as Oran and Sidi Bel Abbès were half-empty.

Despite losing so many people in the Pied-Noir exodus, the region is currently rebounding. The population of the commune in 1933 was 41,645. In 1998 the population was 13,779. And according to the 2008 census, the population was 16,013.

== Other ==
- Aïn El Berd is the location of the mausoleum of Sidi (Saint) Ma'âchou, which attracts visitors from all around north-western Algeria.
- There is a celebration every autumn - the Waada of Aïn El Berd.
- Nearby spring: 'Ain Melegra 35°22′25.07″N 0°28′9.7″W
- Nearby hill: Hammar Zahtar 35°20′45.6″N 0°28′19.96″W
- Nearby mountain: Djebel Boû Rdjiyâ 35°22′51.24″N 0°32′44.38″W

== See also ==
- Algerian War
- Pied-Noir
