= Sehala Thaoura =

Coordinates: 35°12′04″N 0°49′54″W

- Commune and town
- Interactive map of Sehala Thaoura
- Country: Algeria
- Province: Sidi Bel Abbès Province
- Time zone: UTC+1 (CET)

Sehala Thaoura is a town and commune in Sidi Bel Abbès Province in north-western Algeria.
