= Boukhanafis =

Coordinates: 35°03′58″N 0°43′24″W

- Commune and town
- Interactive map of Boukhanafis
- Country: Algeria
- Province: Sidi Bel Abbès Province
- Time zone: UTC+1 (CET)

Boukhanafis is a town and commune in Sidi Bel Abbès Province in northwestern Algeria.
