= Aïn Kada =

Ain Kada عين قادة
- Commune and town
- Coordinates: 35.1369491°N 0.8558715°W
- Country: Algeria
- Province: Sidi Bel Abbès Province
- Time zone: UTC+1 (CET)

Ain Kada is a town and commune in Sidi Bel Abbès Province in northwestern Algeria.
