= Tilmouni =

Coordinates: 35°10′27″N 0°32′55″W

- Commune and town
- Interactive map of Tilmouni
- Country: Algeria
- Province: Sidi Bel Abbès Province
- Time zone: UTC+1 (CET)

Tilmouni is a town and commune in Sidi Bel Abbès Province in north-western Algeria.
