= Moulay Slissen =

Coordinates: 34°49′N 0°46′W

- Commune and town
- Interactive map of Moulay Slissen
- Country: Algeria
- Province: Sidi Bel Abbès Province
- Time zone: UTC+1 (CET)

Moulay Slissen is a town and commune in Sidi Bel Abbès Province in northwestern Algeria.
