= Sfissef =

Coordinates: 35°14′N 0°15′W

Sfissef mercier lacombe
- Commune and town
- Interactive map of Sfissef
- Country: Algeria
- Province: Sidi Bel Abbès Province

Government
  - Type: baladiyah

Population (2025)
  - Total: 59,352
- Time zone: UTC+1 (CET)

Sfissef is a town and commune in Sidi Bel Abbès Province in north-western Algeria.
