= Hassi Dahou =

Coordinates: 35°04′19″N 0°32′34″W

- Commune and town
- Interactive map of Hassi Dahou
- Country: Algeria
- Province: Sidi Bel Abbès Province
- Time zone: UTC+1 (CET)

Hassi Dahou is a town and commune in Sidi Bel Abbès Province in northwestern Algeria.
