= Sidi Yacoub, Algeria =

Coordinates: 35°08′N 0°47′W

Sidi Yacoub
- Commune and town
- Interactive map of Sidi Yacoub
- Country: Algeria
- Province: Sidi Bel Abbès Province
- Time zone: UTC+1 (CET)

Sidi Yacoub is a town and commune in Sidi Bel Abbès Province in north-western Algeria.
