= Chettouane Belaila =

Coordinates: 34°57′00″N 0°50′11″W

- Commune and town
- Interactive map of Chettouane Belaila
- Country: Algeria
- Province: Sidi Bel Abbès Province
- Time zone: UTC+1 (CET)

Chettouane Belaila is a town and commune in Sidi Bel Abbès Province in northwestern Algeria.
