= Dhaya, Algeria =

Coordinates: 34°41′N 0°37′W

Dhaya
- Commune and town
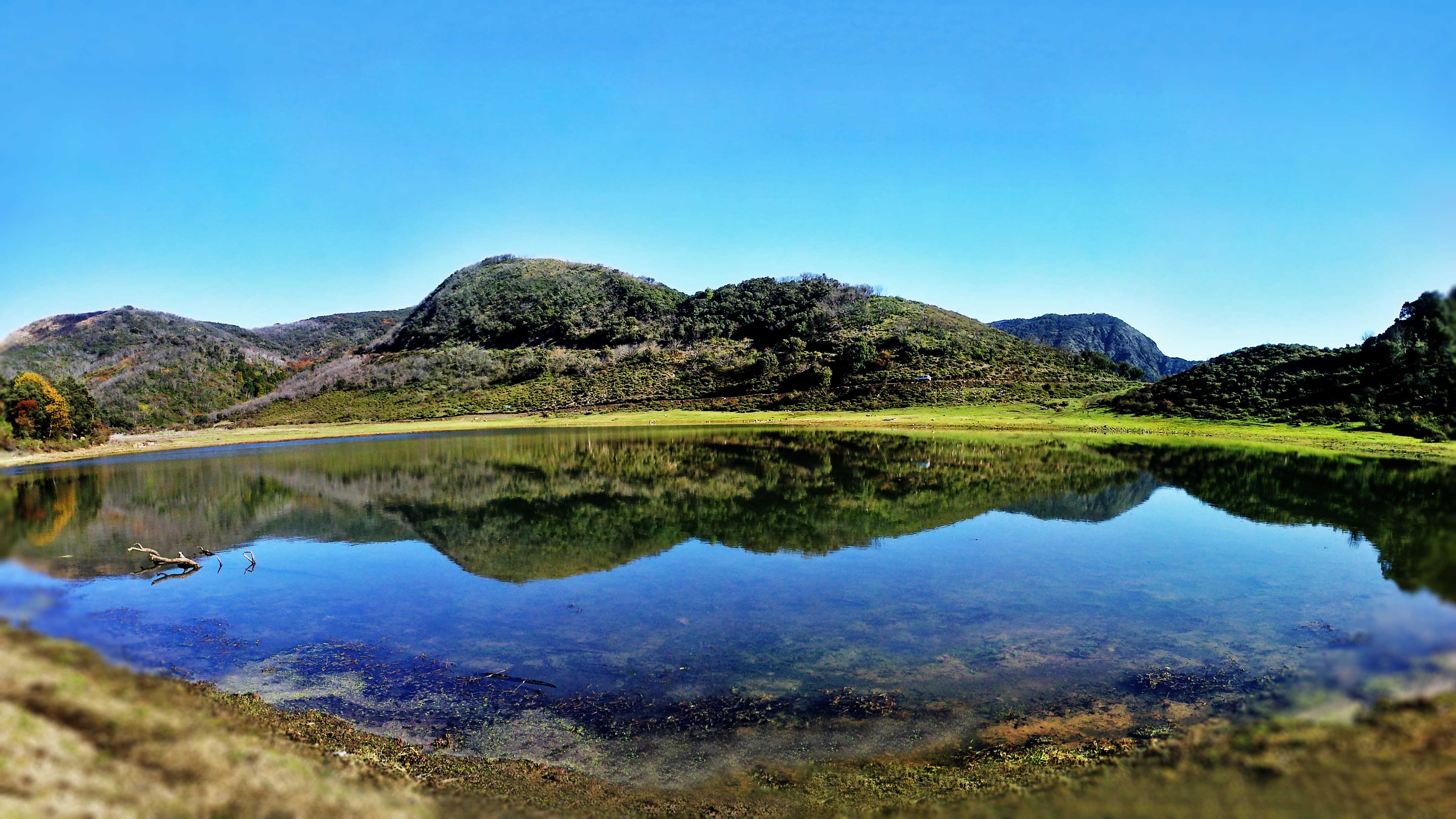

- Location within Algeria
- Country: Algeria
- Province: Sidi Bel Abbès Province
- Time zone: UTC+1 (CET)

Dhaya is a town and commune in Sidi Bel Abbès Province in northwestern Algeria.
