= Aïn Adden =

Coordinates: 35°19′46″N 0°15′41″W

Ain Adden
- Commune and town
- Interactive map of Ain Adden
- Country: Algeria
- Province: Sidi Bel Abbès Province
- Time zone: UTC+1 (CET)

Ain Adden is a town and commune in Sidi Bel Abbès Province in northwestern Algeria.
