= Malek Belarbi =

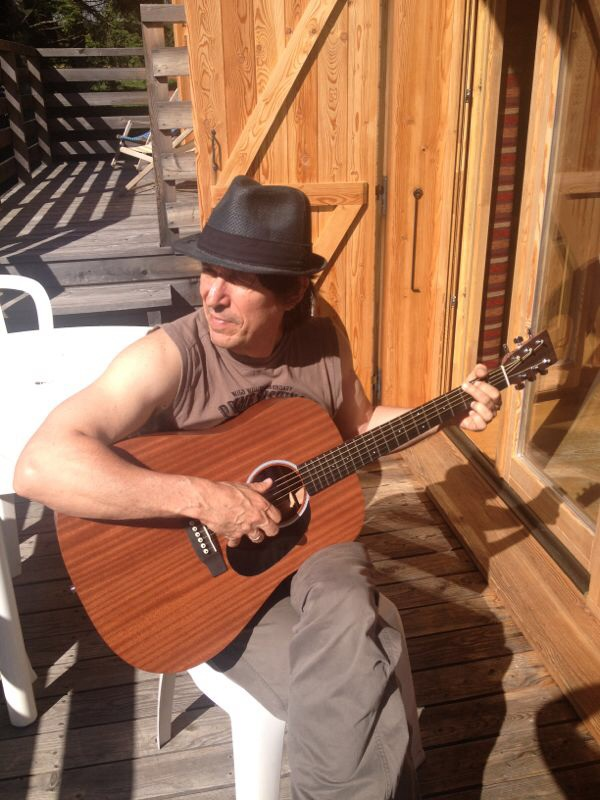

Background information
- Born: 21 July 1959 (age 65); Aix-en-Provence, Bouches-du-Rhône
- Genres: French pop music; Chanson; soul; rhythm and blues
- Occupations: Singer-songwriter; record producer; Poet
- Instrument(s): Vocals, guitar
- Years active: 1976–present

Malek Belarbi (born 21 July 1959) is a Moroccan French singer-songwriter, record producer and poet. His mother, Marie-Louise Belarbi, was a bookseller and publisher.
