= Sidi Chaib =

Coordinates: 34°35′36″N 0°32′55″W

Sidi Chaib سيدي شعيب
- Commune and town
- Interactive map of Sidi Chaib
- Country: Algeria
- Province: Sidi Bel Abbès Province
- Time zone: UTC+1 (CET)

Sidi Chaib ( Arabic: سيدي شعيب) is a town and commune in Sidi Bel Abbès Province in north-western Algeria.
