= Aïn Tindamine =

Coordinates: 34°41′23″N 0°43′14″W

Ain Tindamine
- Commune and town
- Interactive map of Ain Tindamine
- Country: Algeria
- Province: Sidi Bel Abbès Province
- Time zone: UTC+1 (CET)

Ain Tindamine is a town and commune in Sidi Bel Abbès Province in northwestern Algeria.
