= Aïn Thrid =

Coordinates: 35°17′05″N 0°40′33″W

Ain Thrid
- Commune and town
- Interactive map of Ain Thrid
- Country: Algeria
- Province: Sidi Bel Abbès Province
- Time zone: UTC+1 (CET)

Ain Thrid is a town and commune in Sidi Bel Abbès Province in northwestern Algeria.

Lake Sidi Mohamed Benali is located within the territory of the municipality.
