= Abdeldjelil Belarbi =

Algerian-American structural engineer

Abdeldjelil "DJ" Belarbi is an Algerian-American structural engineer and researcher whose research deals with the design, evaluation, and rehabilitation of reinforced and prestressed concrete bridges and buildings. He is currently the Hugh Roy and Lillie Cranz Cullen Distinguished Professor at University of Houston and previously a Distinguished Professor of Civil Engineering at Missouri University of Science and Technology.

Belarbi is engaged in structural engineering research areas. His primary research contributions focus on the constitutive modelling, analytical, and experimental investigations of reinforced and prestressed concrete structures. His research has also focused on the use FRP composites for internal reinforcement of structural concrete as well as rehabilitation and strengthening of aging and deteriorated civil engineering infrastructure. Belarbi has published over 230 technical research papers and had supervised over 50 MSCE theses and PhD dissertations and he is a Fellow of the American Society of Civil Engineers (ASCE), the American Concrete Institute (ACI) and the Structural Engineering Institute (SEI). He is the recipient of over 30 awards and honors for his excellence in research, teaching and service to professional community. Belarbi completed his undergraduate studies in Algeria before going to the US in 1984 to further his studies in Houston, Texas.
