= Highway A1 (Algeria) =

Road in Algeria

The North-South Highway

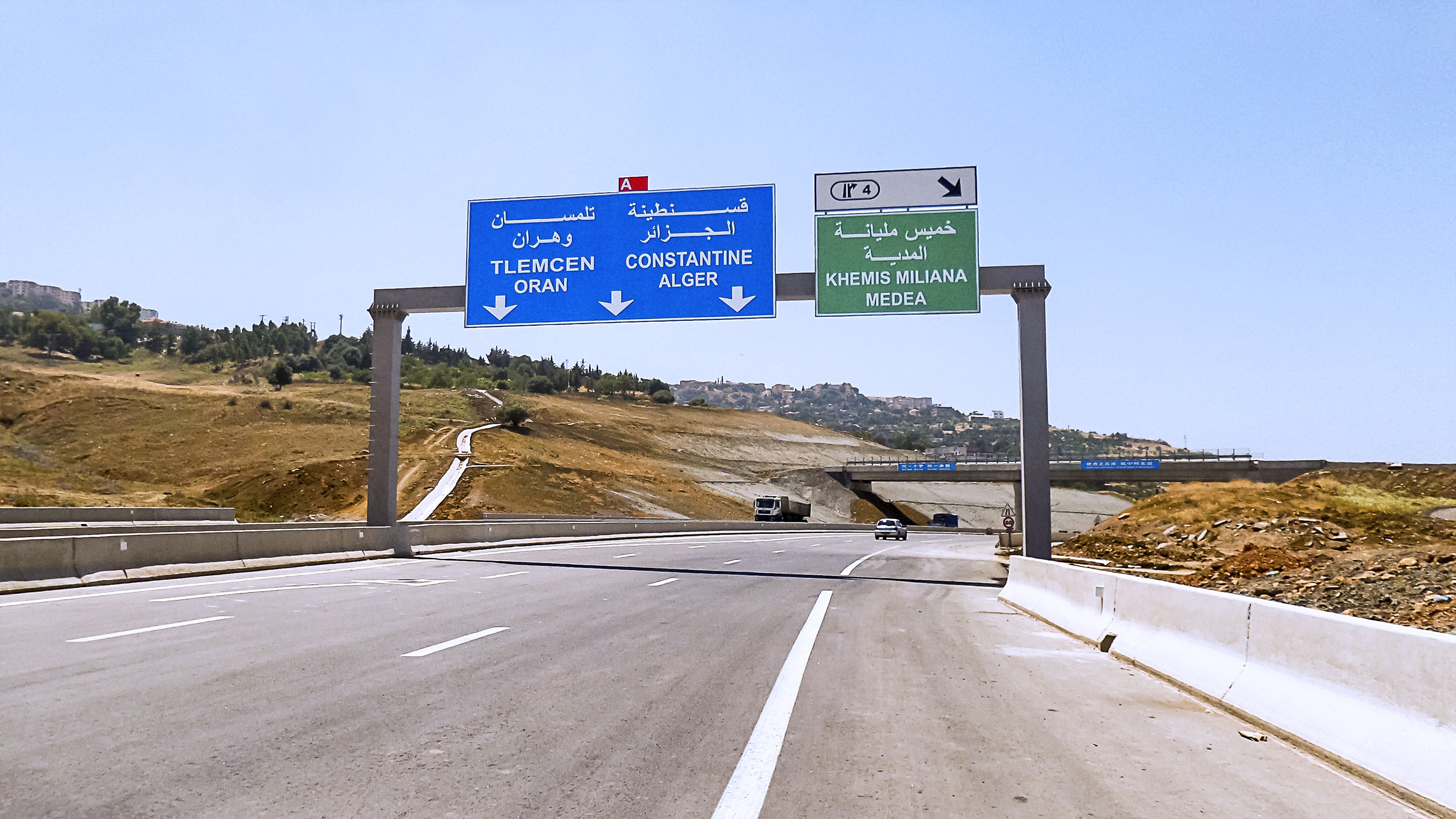

Route information
- Part of TAH 1
- Length: 2,330 km (1,450 mi)

Major junctions
- North end: Algiers
- south end: In Guezzam (Niger-Algeria Border)

Location
- Country: Algeria
- Provinces: Algiers; Blida; Medea; Djelfa; Laghouat; Ghardaia; El Menia; In Salah; Tamanrasset

Highway system
- Algerian Highways

Highway A1 also called The North-South Highway (Autoroute Nord-Sud) is a toll-free controlled-access highway in Algeria

It spans the length of 306 km with 2x3 lane configuration it starts in Hussein Dey in Algiers and turns into 2x2 lane configuration in Djelfa and it's under construction to be a 2x3 until El Menia and ends at the Algeria-Niger Border near In Guezzam
