= Sidi Khaled, Sidi Bel Abbès =

Coordinates: 35.1131°N 0.7194°E

Sidi Khaled
- Commune and town
- Interactive map of Sidi Khaled
- Country: Algeria
- Province: Sidi Bel Abbès Province
- Time zone: UTC+1 (CET)

Sidi Khaled is a town and commune in Sidi Bel Abbès Province in north-western Algeria.
