= Bir El Hammam =

Coordinates: 34°25′08″N 0°29′57″W

- Commune and town
- Interactive map of Bir El Hammam
- Country: Algeria
- Province: Sidi Bel Abbès Province
- Time zone: UTC+1 (CET)

Bir El Hammam is a town and commune in Sidi Bel Abbès Province in northwestern Algeria.
