= Taoudmout =

Coordinates: 34°35′16″N 0°06′37″W

- Commune and town
- Interactive map of Taoudmout
- Country: Algeria
- Province: Sidi Bel Abbès Province
- Time zone: UTC+1 (CET)

Taoudmout is a town and commune in Sidi Bel Abbès Province in north-western Algeria.
