= Boudjebaa El Bordj =

Coordinates: 35°21′05″N 0°19′29″W

- Commune and town
- Interactive map of Boudjebaa El Bordj
- Country: Algeria
- Province: Sidi Bel Abbès Province
- Time zone: UTC+1 (CET)

Boudjebaa El Bordj is a town and commune in Sidi Bel Abbès Province in northwestern Algeria.
