= Benachiba Chelia =

Coordinates: 34.9634°N 0.6145°W

- Commune and town
- Interactive map of Benachiba Chelia
- Country: Algeria
- Province: Sidi Bel Abbès Province
- Time zone: UTC+1 (CET)

Benachiba Chelia is a town and commune in Sidi Bel Abbès Province in northwestern Algeria.
