= Teghalimet =

Coordinates: 34°53′N 0°33′W

- Commune and town
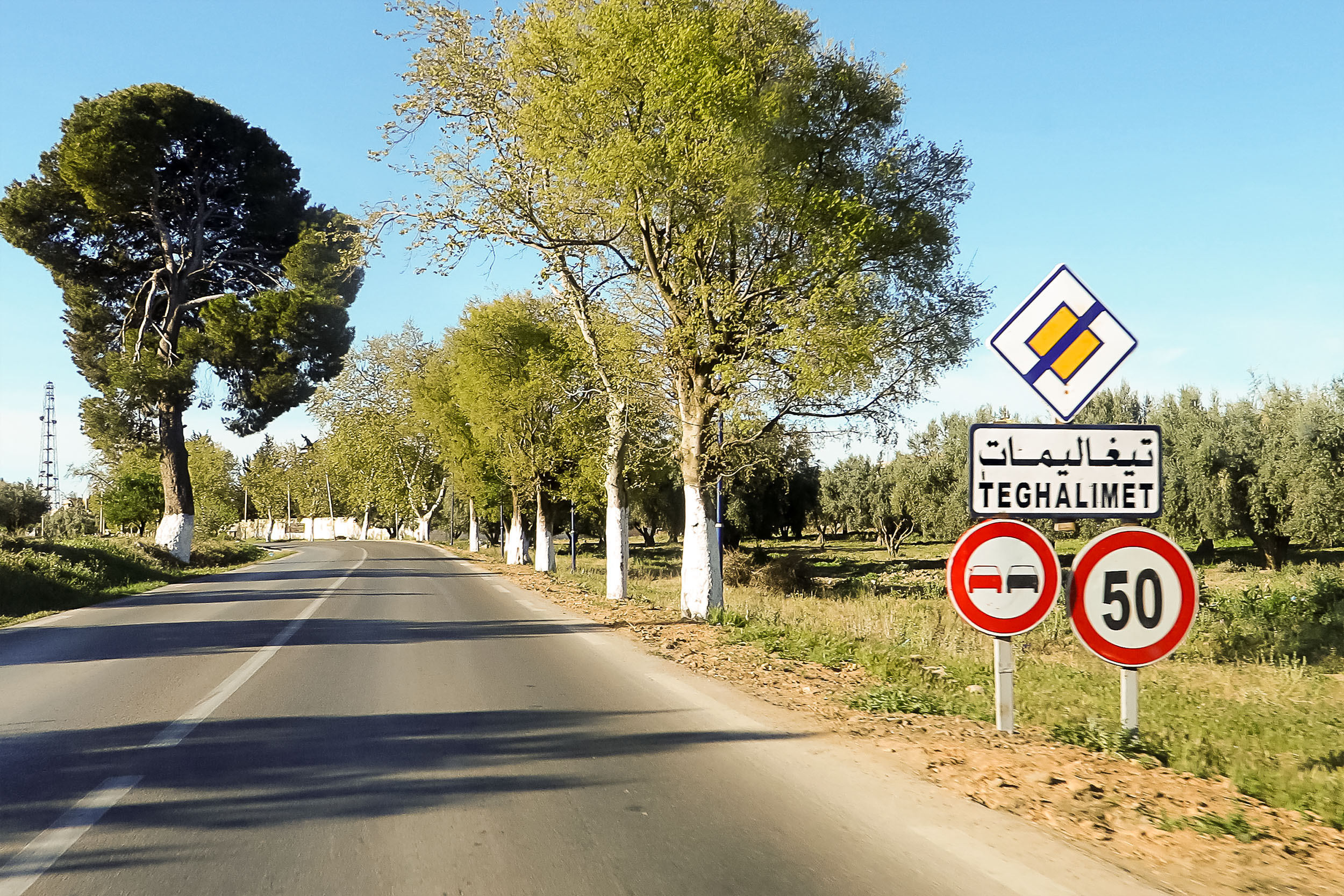
- Interactive map of Teghalimet
- Country: Algeria
- Province: Sidi Bel Abbès Province
- Time zone: UTC+1 (CET)

Teghalimet is a town and commune in Sidi Bel Abbès Province in north-western Algeria.
