= Ben Badis, Sidi Bel Abbès =

Coordinates: 34°57′10″N 0°54′52″W

Ben Badis
- Commune and town
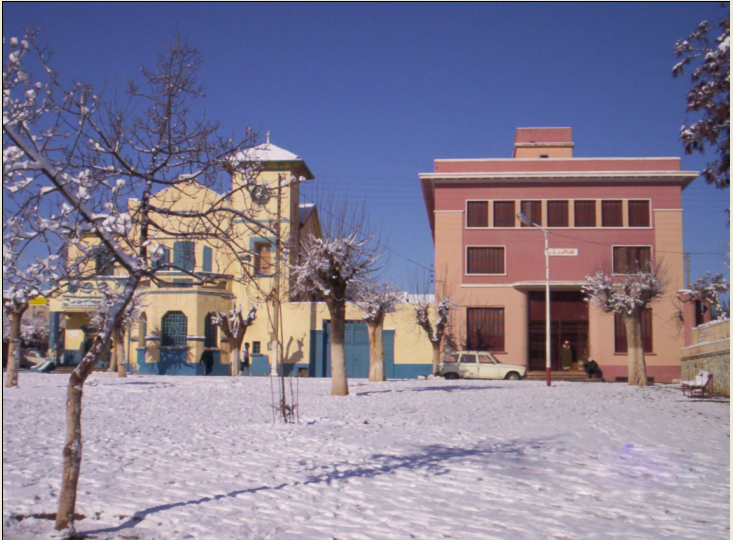
- Interactive map of Ben Badis
- Country: Algeria
- Province: Sidi Bel Abbès Province
- Time zone: UTC+1 (CET)

Ben Badis is a town and commune in Sidi Bel Abbès Province in northwestern Algeria.
