= Sidi Ali Boussidi =

Coordinates: 35°06′N 0°50′W

- Commune and town
- Interactive map of Sidi Ali Boussidi
- Country: Algeria
- Province: Sidi Bel Abbès Province
- Time zone: UTC+1 (CET)

Sidi Ali Boussidi is a town and commune located in the Sidi Bel Abbès Province in northwestern Algeria. The town is situated approximately 22 kilometers from the provincial capital, Sidi Bel Abbès.

Historical Background

Originally known as Aïn el Hadjar, the town was established in 1876 as a center for colonization. In 1885, it was renamed Parmentier, in honor of Antoine-Augustin Parmentier, a renowned French agronomist and pharmacist celebrated for promoting the cultivation of potatoes in France. Following Algeria's independence, the town adopted its current name, Sidi Ali Boussidi.

Geography and Climate

Sidi Ali Boussidi is located in a flat plain at an elevation of approximately 600 meters (1,968.5 feet). The region experiences a hot-summer Mediterranean climate ("Csa" according to the Köppen climate classification), characterized by hot, dry summers and mild, wet winters. Wikipedia

Administrative Division

The town serves as the administrative center of the Sidi Ali Boussidi District, which is further divided into four municipalities:

- Sidi Ali Boussidi
- Aïn Kada
- Lamtar
- Sidi Daho el Zairs

Nearby Localities

Adjacent to Sidi Ali Boussidi are the villages of Aïn Kada, located approximately 4.5 kilometers to the northwest, and Lamtar, situated about 4.5 kilometers to the southeast. The town's historical evolution from Aïn el Hadjar to Parmentier and finally to Sidi Ali Boussidi reflects its rich cultural heritage and the broader historical shifts in the region.
