= Telagh =

Coordinates: 34°47′N 0°34′W

Telagh تلاغ
- Commune and town
- Country: Algeria
- Province: Sidi Bel Abbès Province
- Established: 2012-2017

Government

Area
  - Total: 68.37 sq mi (177.09 km^{2})

Population (2008)
  - Total: 24,594
- Time zone: UTC+1 (CET)
- CP: 22400

Telagh (Arabic: تلاغ) is a town and commune in Sidi Bel Abbès Province in north-western Algeria.
