= Tafissour =

Coordinates: 34°46′51″N 0°27′02″W

- Commune and town
- Interactive map of Tafissour
- Country: Algeria
- Province: Sidi Bel Abbès Province
- Time zone: UTC+1 (CET)

Tafissour is a town and commune in Sidi Bel Abbès Province in north-western Algeria. According to the 1998 census it has a population of 1864 and 2515 according to the 2008 census.
