= Oued Sefioun =

Coordinates: 34°59′46″N 0°05′36″W

- Commune and town
- Interactive map of Oued Sefioun
- Country: Algeria
- Province: Sidi Bel Abbès Province
- Time zone: UTC+1 (CET)

Oued Sefioun is a town and commune in Sidi Bel Abbès Province in northwestern Algeria.
