= El Hamadna =

- Commune and town
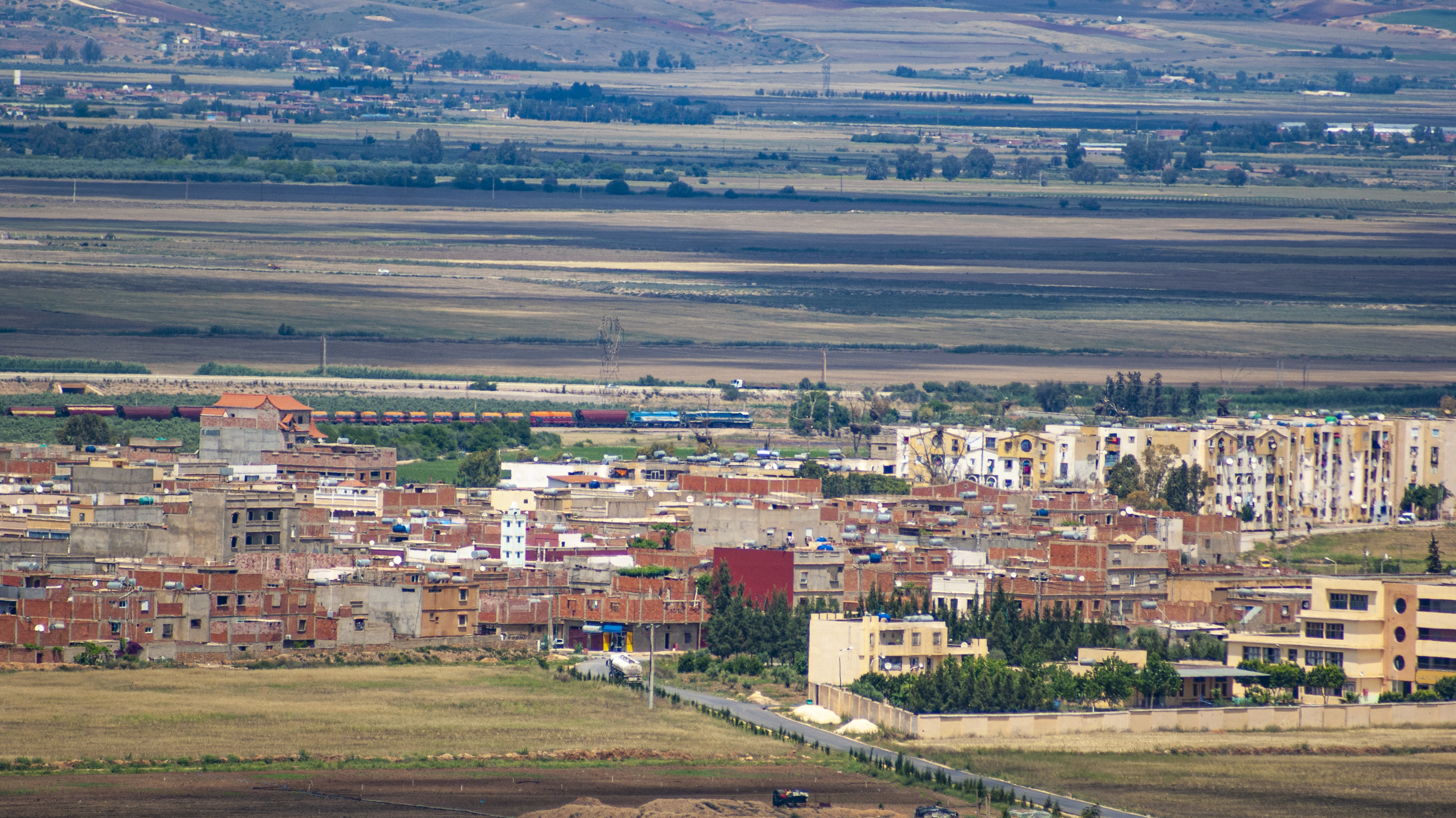

- Location within Algeria
- Country: Algeria
- Province: Relizane Province
- Time zone: UTC+1 (CET)

El Hamadna is a town and commune in Relizane Province, Algeria.
