= Mezaourou =

- Commune and town
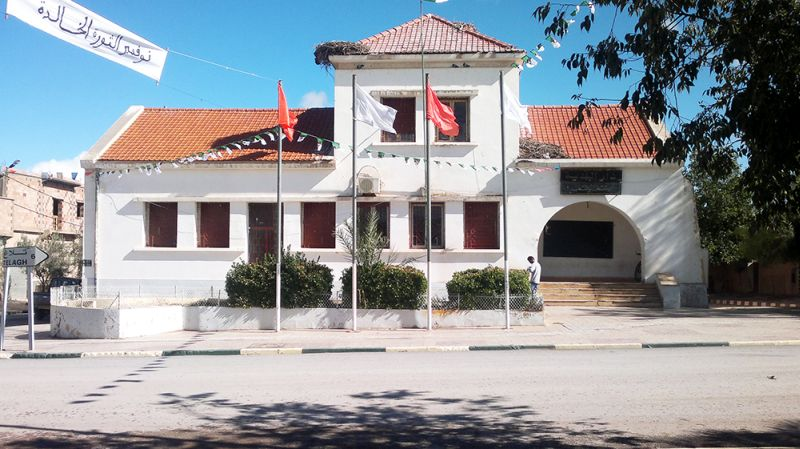
- Mezaourou

- Location within Algeria
- Coordinates: 34.8173267°N 0.6233189°W
- Country: Algeria
- Province: Sidi Bel Abbès Province
- Time zone: UTC+1 (CET)

Mezaourou is a town and commune in Sidi Bel Abbès Province in northwestern Algeria.
