= Oued Taourira =

Coordinates: 34°37′11″N 0°20′20″W

- Commune and town
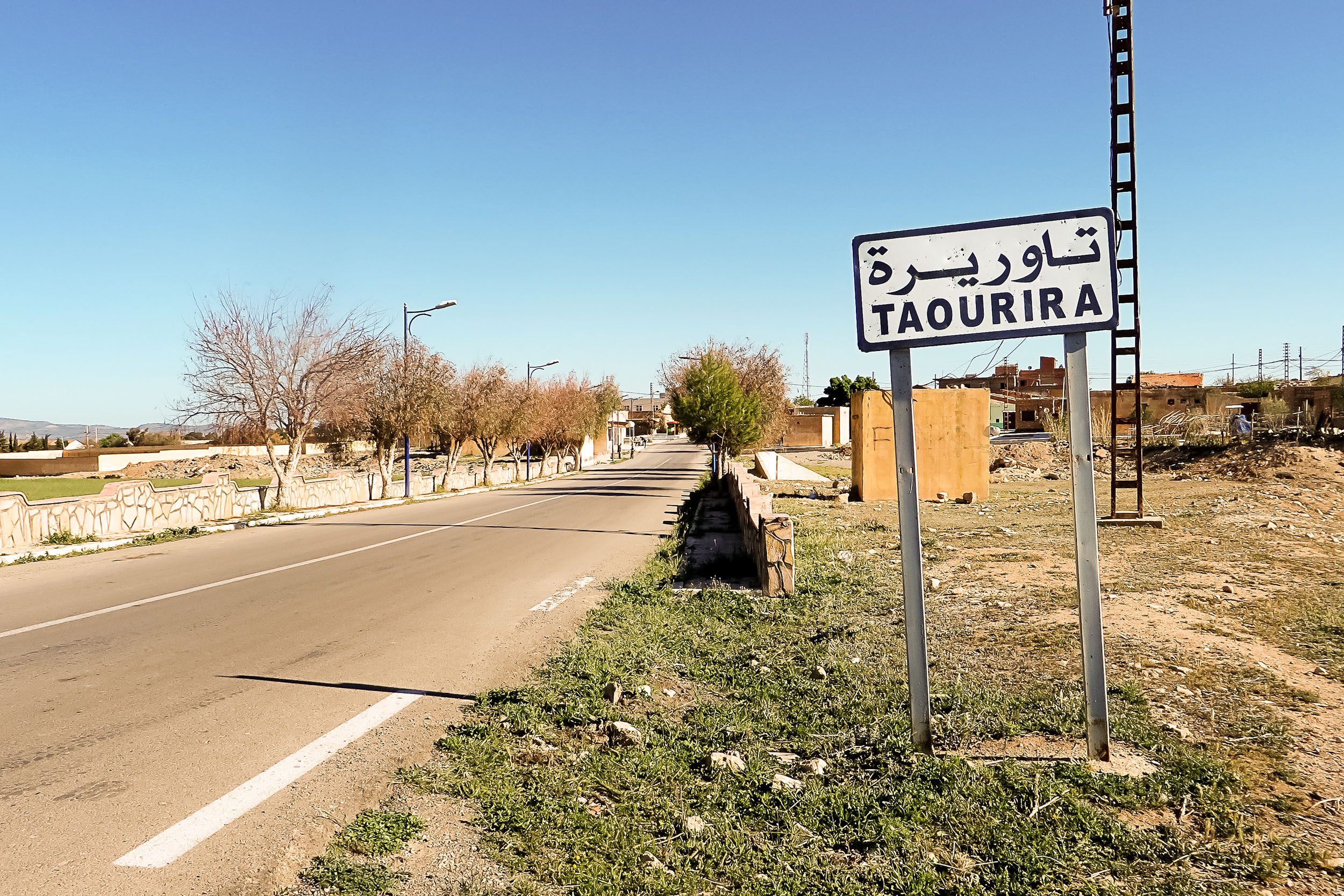
- Oued Taourira
- Interactive map of Oued Taourira
- Country: Algeria
- Province: Sidi Bel Abbès Province
- Time zone: UTC+1 (CET)

Oued Taourira is a town and commune in Sidi Bel Abbès Province in northwestern Algeria.
