= Tabia, Sidi Bel Abbès =

Coordinates: 35°01′04″N 0°44′02″W

Tabia Tabia - Sidi Bel Abbès
- Commune and town
- Interactive map of Tabia
- Country: Algeria
- Province: Sidi Bel Abbès Province
- Time zone: UTC+1 (CET)

Tabia is a town and commune in Sidi Bel Abbès Province in north-western Algeria.
