= Sidi Bel Abbès =

City in Algeria

Sidi Bel Abbès سيدي بلعباس
- City
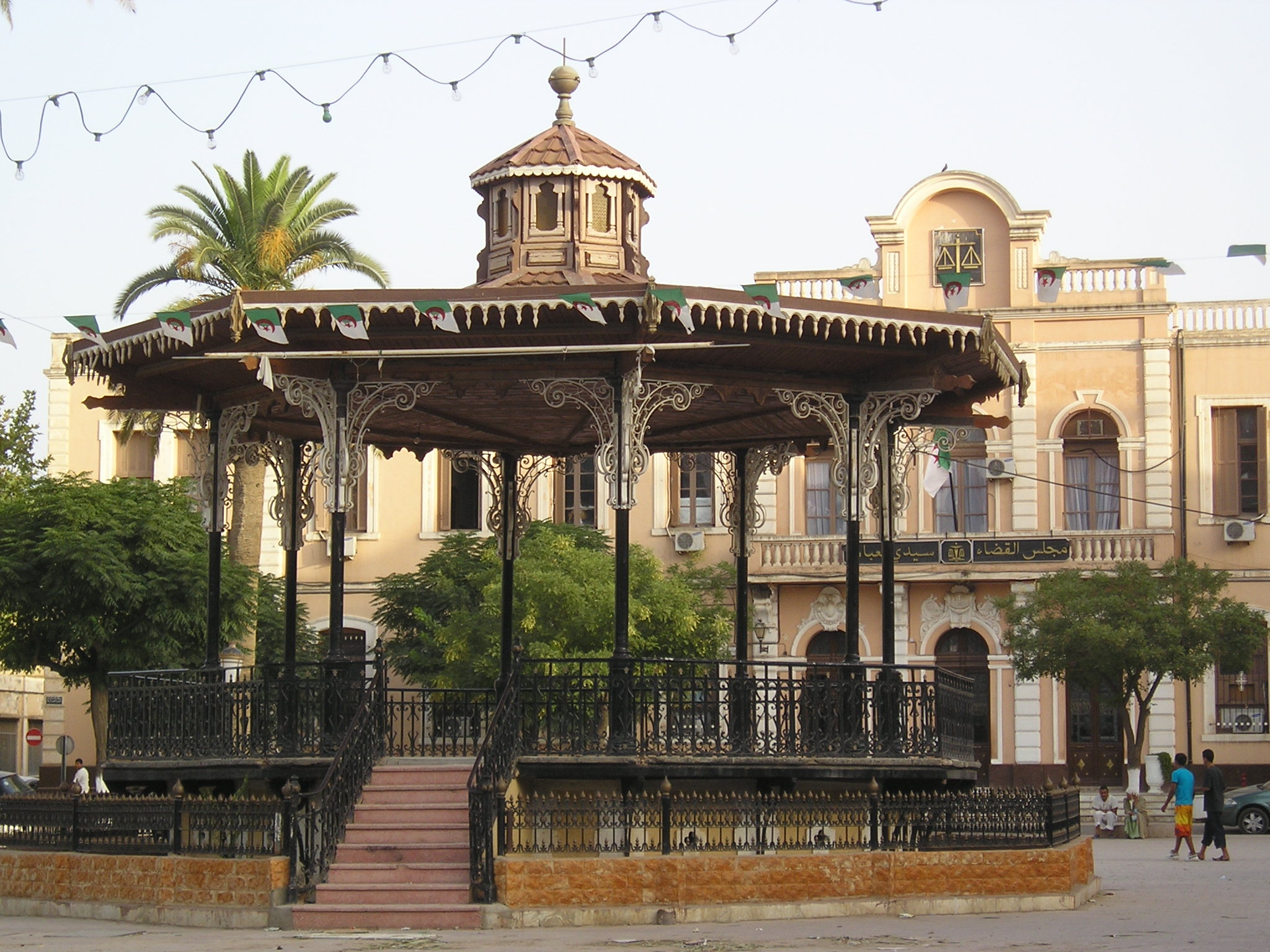
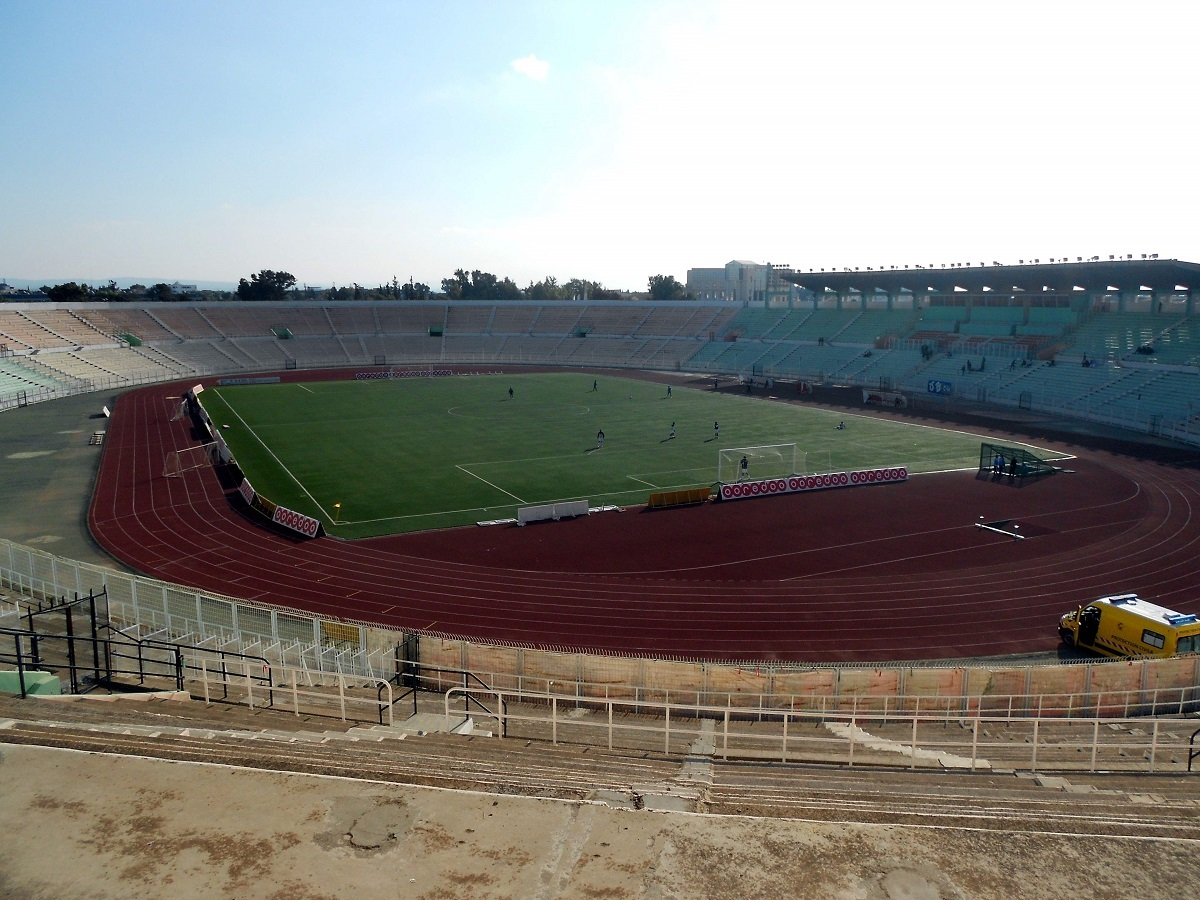
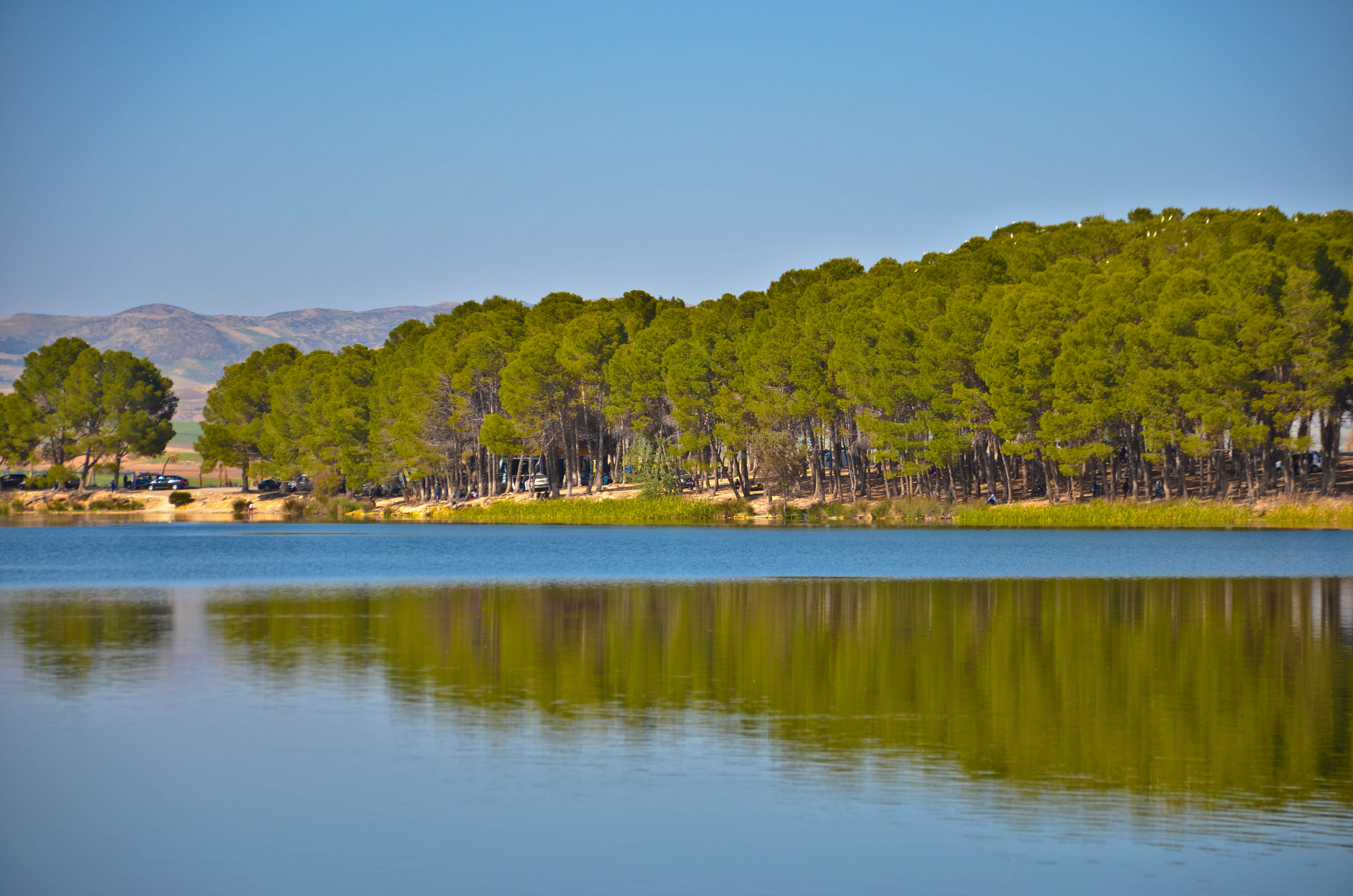
- Motto: 1st November Place 24 February 1956 Stadium Sidi Mohamed Benali Lake

- Location of Sidi Bel Abbès in the Sidi Bel Abbès Province

- Location of Sidi Bel Abbès in Algeria Sidi Bel Abbès (Africa)
- Coordinates: 35°11′38″N 0°38′29″W
- Country: Algeria
- Province: Sidi Bel Abbès Province
- District: Sidi Bel Abbès District
- APC: Miloud Magherbi (2021-2026)

Government
  - Type: Municipality

Area
  - Total: 27 sq mi (70 km^{2})
- Elevation: 1,540 ft (470 m)

Population (2008)
  - Total: 212,935
  - Density: 7,900/sq mi (3,000/km^{2})
- Time zone: UTC+1 (CET)
- Postal code: 22000
- Area code: 048
- ISO 3166 code: CP

Sidi Bel Abbès (Arabic: سيدي بلعباس, romanized: Sīdī Bu ’l-ʿAbbās), also called Bel Abbès, is the capital (2005 pop. 200,000) of the Sidi Bel Abbès wilaya (2005 pop. 590,000), Algeria. It is named after Sidi bel Abbass, a Muslim marabout or noble man who is buried there. The city is the commercial center of an important area of vineyards, market gardens, orchards, and grain fields. It was formerly surrounded by a wall with four gates, and today is home to a university. Sidi Bel Abbès is 75 kilometers from the Mediterranean Sea.

== History ==
The present city, on the Wadi Sig River, developed around a French camp built in 1843. In 1849 a planned agricultural town was established around the existing military post. From the 1830s until 1962 the city was closely associated with the French Foreign Legion, being the location of its basic training camp, and the headquarters of its 1st Foreign Regiment. In the late 1890s the town, described as being of Spanish appearance, had a civilian population of about 30,000. The main buildings were in the French military district of the Quartier Vienot. The training centre of the modern Algerian National Gendarmerie is located in Sidi Bel Abbès.

In the 1930s much of the old city walls were demolished. Wide boulevards and squares replaced the traditional quarters, causing the town to lose much of its former character.

== Geography ==
The city sits astride both banks of the Sig River, and lake Sidi Mohamed Benali. The lake provides a major water reserve for the area.

=== Climate ===
Sidi Bel Abbès has a semi-arid climate (Köppen climate classification BSk).

Climate data for Sidi Bel Abbès (1991–2020)
Month	Jan	Feb	Mar	Apr	May	Jun	Jul	Aug	Sep	Oct	Nov	Dec	Year
Record high °C (°F)	24.5 (76.1)	30.5 (86.9)	33.6 (92.5)	35.1 (95.2)	42.7 (108.9)	43.7 (110.7)	44.9 (112.8)	45.0 (113.0)	41.4 (106.5)	38.6 (101.5)	31.2 (88.2)	28.0 (82.4)	45.0 (113.0)
Mean daily maximum °C (°F)	15.4 (59.7)	16.4 (61.5)	19.1 (66.4)	21.7 (71.1)	26.2 (79.2)	31.3 (88.3)	35.5 (95.9)	35.6 (96.1)	30.4 (86.7)	26.0 (78.8)	19.5 (67.1)	16.3 (61.3)	24.4 (75.9)
Daily mean °C (°F)	9.0 (48.2)	9.9 (49.8)	12.2 (54.0)	14.5 (58.1)	18.4 (65.1)	23.0 (73.4)	26.8 (80.2)	27.1 (80.8)	22.8 (73.0)	18.7 (65.7)	13.2 (55.8)	10.3 (50.5)	17.2 (63.0)
Mean daily minimum °C (°F)	2.7 (36.9)	3.4 (38.1)	5.4 (41.7)	7.2 (45.0)	10.6 (51.1)	14.6 (58.3)	18.1 (64.6)	18.5 (65.3)	15.2 (59.4)	11.4 (52.5)	6.9 (44.4)	4.2 (39.6)	9.8 (49.6)
Record low °C (°F)	−9.4 (15.1)	−5.5 (22.1)	−4.2 (24.4)	−2.0 (28.4)	−1.5 (29.3)	5.3 (41.5)	8.4 (47.1)	6.7 (44.1)	4.4 (39.9)	0.8 (33.4)	−3.8 (25.2)	−6.6 (20.1)	−9.4 (15.1)
Average precipitation mm (inches)	49.0 (1.93)	38.0 (1.50)	37.8 (1.49)	32.4 (1.28)	22.9 (0.90)	7.4 (0.29)	2.0 (0.08)	4.2 (0.17)	20.6 (0.81)	29.2 (1.15)	50.9 (2.00)	41.4 (1.63)	335.8 (13.22)
Average precipitation days (≥ 1.0 mm)	6.5	5.8	5.4	5.0	3.5	1.1	0.3	1.0	3.0	3.8	5.9	5.5	46.8
Source: NOAA

=== Neighborhoods ===
Sidi Bel Abbès has 26 regional neighborhoods. These are: Campus, Ben Hamouda, American Village, Rocher, Sidi Djilali, Environment, Gambetta, Maconi, Soricor, La Brimer, Londeau, Sidi Yacine, Saqia Hamra, Village Perrin, Village Bira, Adda boudjelal, El Makam, El madina el Mounaouara, Bab Eddaya, Boumlik (Campo), Downtown, Grebah, Cimitiere Houria, Cite 20 Aout, Village Tierre, Village de Gaulle.

== Culture ==
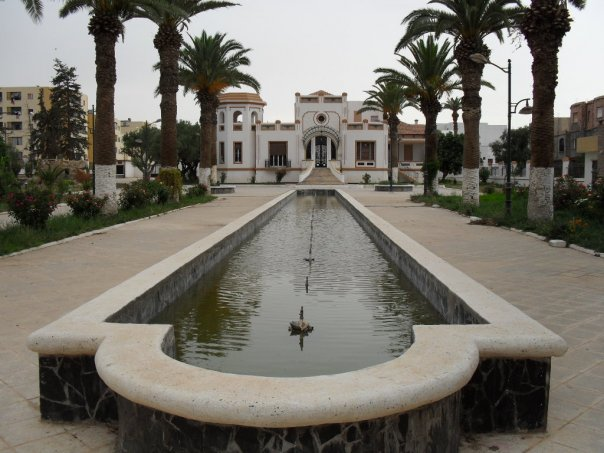
École des Beaux Arts in Sidi Bel Abbès

=== Music ===
Rai music is the most famous music in the city and it is known for many rai chebs like Djilali Amarna.

=== Sport ===
Association football is the most popular sport in the city. The local football team is USM Bel Abbès, which plays in 24 Fevrier Stadium. Basketball, handball, and volleyball are also popular and are played in middle and high schools or sports complexes, such as Adda Boudjelal Sportive Complex. The city also has a rugby union club, MC Sidi Bel Abbès.

== Economy ==
The economy centers on agriculture, particularly the production of cereals such as wheat and barley and the grape industry. A farm machine manufacturing complex is located there. There is an industrial zone which plays a major role in the city's economy.

=== Markets ===
There are many markets in Sidi Bel Abbès. Souk el Felah and Souk el Lile are the main two markets for fruit and vegetables.

== Education ==
- Djillali Liabès University of Sidi Bel Abbès

== Transportation ==
=== Route ===
Sidi Bel Abbès is well connected to other Algerian cities by roads. Oran is 70 kilometers north and Tlemcen is 90 kilometers west. The West-East Route passes near the city.

=== Airport ===
The closest international airport is Oran Es Sénia, but the city is served by a domestic one: Sidi Bel Abbès Airport (IATA: BFW, ICAO: DAOS) but it is not for the public use.

=== Tramway ===
The Sidi Bel Abbès tramway line was opened on July 25, 2017. The light rail line is 14.7 kilometers in length, with 22 stations covering most of the main points in the city such as 3 Bus stations, Daira, University campus, Down Town, and Public Garden, although it doesn't serve the west of the city and the south.

=== Train ===
Sidi Bel Abbès has a railway station from which trains travel to Oran, Tlemcen, Béchar and Saïda. A rail link between Algeria and Morocco passes through the city but this link has been discontinued for political reasons.

== Tourism ==
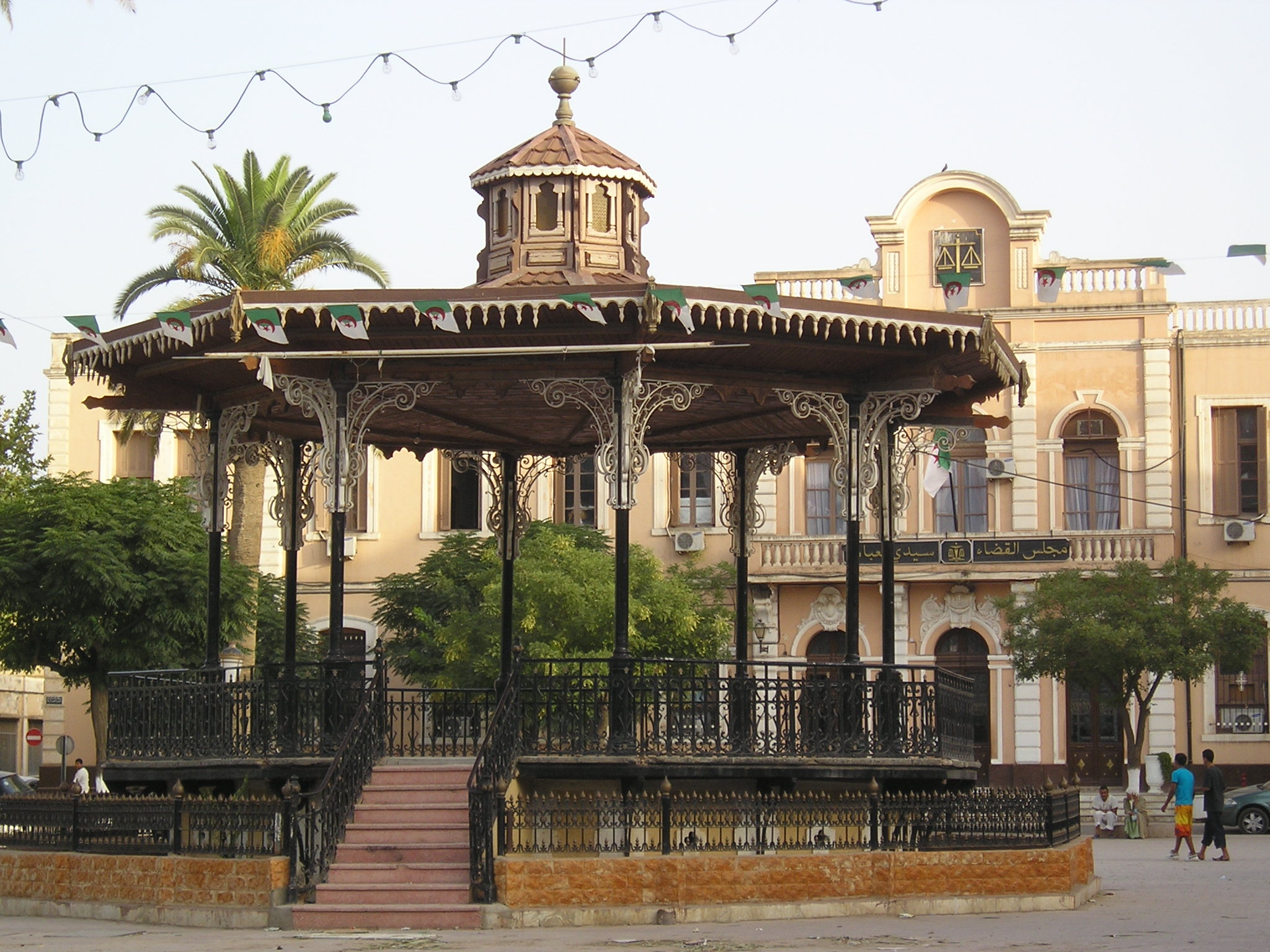
Place Carnot

=== Landmarks ===
Sidi Bel Abbès has several historical landmarks. These include Place Carnot which was renamed Place 1er Novembre after independence. This is a square situated in the central city. Perrin Castle is a fortress situated between Sidi Bel Abbès and Sidi Lahcene and built in the French style of architecture. The town hall, also built in the historical French pattern was formally a cathedral. The FLN party office was in colonial times a military building.

=== Hotels ===
Sidi Bel Abbès has five hotels, including Beni tella and Eden, "Metropole I", "Metropole II", "Quods".

== Notable people ==
- René Viviani (November 8, 1863 – September 7, 1925), French politician of the Third Republic, who served as Prime Minister for the first year of World War I
- Marco Torrès (January 22, 1888 – January 15, 1963), Olympic gymnast, two-time World All-Around Champion
- Gaston Julia (February 3, 1893 – March 19, 1978), mathematician famous for the Julia set in chaos theory
- Marcel Cerdan (1916–1949), French boxer, known as Le Bombardier Marocain ("The Moroccan Bomber")
- Mohammed Bedjaoui (born 21 September 1929), foreign minister, former Minister of Justice (1964–1970), Ambassador to France (1970–1979) and Algerian permanent representative to the UN (1979–1982). He was a judge on the International Court of Justice at The Hague (1982–2001).
- Jean Boyer (1948–2004), French organist
- Jean-Marc Noël Cardinal Aveline, Archbishop of Marseille born in 1958
- Brigitte Giraud (born 1960), French writer
- Kad Merad (born 1964), actor in the 2008 French comedy film Bienvenue chez les Ch'tis
- Éric Delétang (born 1966), former French professional footballer
