= Yellel District =

Coordinates: 35°43′19″N 0°21′13″E

- District
- Interactive map of Yellel District
- Country: Algeria
- Province: Relizane Province
- Time zone: UTC+1 (CET)

Yellel District is a district of Relizane Province, Algeria.

The district is further divided into 4 municipalities:

- Yellel
- Aïn Rahma
- Kalaa
- Sidi Saada
