= Al-Batha, Algeria =

Medieval city in Algeria

Al-Batha', also known as El-Batha (in Arabic: البطحاء, Arabic pronunciation: [al‿batˈħaːʔ]), is a medieval historical city from the central Maghreb, located in Algeria, that no longer exists today. Mentioned as early as the first centuries of Islam, it has had a tumultuous history, particularly under the Rustemids, Fatimids, Zirids, and Zayyanids. Its strategic military, political, and economic role made it an important center, before the city was reduced to ruins at the end of the 15th century due to tribal conflicts.

The name of the city appears to derive from the Arabic term batha, which means a flat area where water flows, leaving behind earth and small pebbles. However, medieval sources also mention variations such as Al-Sedra or Bunobure. The exact location of the city remains uncertain, although some researchers suggest sites between Relizane and Mostaganem. After its destruction, the city was revived in the 16th century by a Sufi hermit named Sidi Céna. It is possible that he was Yahia Ben Mohammed, known as Abou es-Sadat, from Tlemcen, who founded a zawiya and attracted a spiritual community.

Despite having played a major role in the history of the central Maghreb, the city left no clear trace of its end, and its exact location is still a matter of debate among historians.

== History ==
=== Name ===
The most commonly attributed name to this city in historical sources is Al-Batha' (البطحاء), a toponym that seems to derive from the Arabic word batha (بطحة), which can mean a vast and flat area where water flows, leaving behind soil and small gravel. However, some sources propose variations. The Algerian historian Mebarek Al-Mili, in his work The History of Algeria in Ancient and Modern Times , cites a medieval author, al-Dimashqi (11th century), who refers to the city under the name Al-Sedra (السدرة). On his side, the Spanish geographer and chronicler of the 16th century Luis del Mármol Carvajal, in his work General Description of Africa, recounts that the city was once called Bunobure.

=== Origins and historical evolution ===
The exact origin of Al-Batha' remains difficult to establish with certainty. However, the region is mentioned as early as the first centuries of the Islamic conquest, notably during the time of the Rustemids, when it fell under their authority. Around 785 (240 AH), following the internal troubles that struck the Rustemid Imamate, the city is believed to have fallen under the control of an opponent of Imam Aflah ibn Abd al-Wahhab.

With the arrival of the Fatimids and their expansion into the Central Maghreb, Al-Batha' was briefly incorporated into their domain. However, this control was short-lived, as according to Ibn Khaldun, the region later passed under the authority of the Banu Ilumi, a tribe from the Zenata confederation of the Maghraouas. The situation changed again with the rise of the Zirids, a Sanhaja dynasty initially allied with the Fatimids. During this period, a rival leader, Mohammed ibn Khayr ibn Khurz al-Maghrawi, (Note: Mohammed ibn Khurz Al-Maghrawi (in Arabic: محمد بن خير بن خرز المغراوي) was an ally of the Umayyads of Córdoba. He was opposed by Ziri ibn Menad during the reign of Al-Hakam II. In 360 AH (970–971), he committed suicide, believing he would be captured) managed to take control of Al-Batha' with the support of his Umayyad allies and the Zenata tribes. This takeover prompted a response from the Zirid leader Ziri ibn Menad, who armed his son Bologhine ibn Ziri to recapture the city and restore Zirid authority.

After the Zirids broke with the Fatimids, the latter encouraged the settlement of Hilalian tribes in the Zirid hinterland, notably the tribe of the Habra, a branch of the Banu Suwayd, which eventually took control of Al-Batha'. From then on, the city entered a prolonged period of instability, marked by repeated tribal conflicts, a climate of tension that seemed to persist even after the arrival of the Hammadids and the Almoravids.

Mohammed al-Baydhaq, 11th-century Maghrebi chronicler in the service of the Almohads, recounts that Ibn Tumart stopped in Al-Batha' on his return journey from Béjaïa to Marrakesh, accompanied by his companion Abd al-Muʾmin. During this stop, Ibn Tumart gave an amulet to his host as a token of gratitude. This testimony confirms that the city had some significance during the Almoravid period. According to researcher Younès Mouassim, the city "would probably have been one of the strategic locations chosen by Ibn Tumart as part of his state-building project, given that all his movements were designed to spread his ideology and seek allies."

As for Ibn Abi Zarʿ, 14th-century Maghrebi chronicler, he mentions in his Rawd al-Qirtas that it was the Almohad caliph ʿAbd al-Muʾmin who ordered the construction of a city at the location where Ismaʿil Al-Khazraji had sacrificed himself to save his life. The exact spot was said to have been marked by the kneeling of the camel carrying the body of the deceased. A qubba (mausoleum) and a mosque were built at this site, and the city was said to have developed around it. ʿAbd al-Muʾmin also stationed 10 trusted men chosen from loyal tribes. However, according to historical accounts, as well as testimonies from earlier chroniclers, it is clear that Al-Batha' existed before the Almohads came to power.

=== Banu Abd al-Wad period ===
Map of the connections of al-Batha' in the 14th century

In the 13th century, with the arrival of the Banu Abd al-Wad Period in the region, the city of Al-Batha' came under their influence. This occurred after Yaghmurasen Ibn Zayan no longer aligned himself with the Almohads and chose to govern his territory independently, thus founding his own kingdom.

== Disappearance and resurgence ==
The city was reduced to ruins by the end of the 15th century. According to Mármol, a 16th-century Spanish chronicler, the city probably remained uninhabited until the arrival of a hermit Sufi, Sidi Céna.

This figure, Sidi Céna, gradually gained popularity among the population, and the local governors began to view him with suspicion, even going so far as to grant him an exemption from paying the traditional tax, the itawa, a form of fiscal tribute. He decided to establish a zawiya and asked his followers, eager to join his ṭariqa (Sufi path of spiritual elevation), to assist him in its construction. He is said to have gathered about 500 disciples (muridin). According to Selma Kasbadji, this figure may be related to Yahia Ben Mohammed, also known as Abou es-Sadat, mentioned by Ibn Maryam in his Boustane. He was said to have come from a Madyouna family and was born in Tlemcen.

Just like the story of its foundation, the circumstances surrounding the disappearance of Al-Batha' remain unknown.

== Location ==
Different hypotheses about the location of the city

The precise location of Al-Batha' remains uncertain, and despite historical suggestions, there are different hypotheses about the location of the city.

From the early 20th century, no archaeological trace or study has definitively confirmed any hypothesis.

Yaqut al-Hamawi, a 13th-century Arab geographer, described it as "a city in the Maghreb, located about three or four days' walk from Tlemcen". Mármol, on the other hand, placed it three leagues from Oran. Leo Africanus localized the city on the territory of the Banu Rached tribe, specifying that not far from there flowed a modest stream: the Oued Mina. Ibn Khaldoun, a 14th-century Arab historian, reported that the city was situated beyond the territory of the Houaras, who controlled the Kalâa des Beni Rached. He also mentioned that the Zenata tribe of the Beni Ilumi took control of the city after the weakening of the Maghraouas and settled on the western bank of the Oued Mina.

Other contemporary researchers, including Mebarek El-Mili, Mokhtar Hassani, Mahdi El-Bouabdelli, and Abderrahmane Djilali, suggest locating Al-Bathaʾ in the current municipality of El Matmar. Salma Kasbadji proposes that the location of Al-Batha', according to historical accounts, could be near the locality of Bou-Guirat.

== Sources ==
=== Primary sources ===
- Africanus, Leo (1896–1898). Description de l'Afrique, traduit par Charles Schefer [Description of Africa, translated by Charles Schefer.] (in French). Ernest Leroux. pp. 37–40.
- del Mármol Carvajal, Luis (1669). "De Batha". L'Afrique de Marmol, de la traduction de Nicolas Perrot [The Africa of Marmol, from the translation of Nicolas Perrot] (in French). pp. 359–360.

=== Secondary sources ===
- Dahmani, Saïd (2016). "Villes et villages d'Algérie du VIIIème au XVIème siècles d'après les géographes" [Towns and villages of Algeria from the 8th to the 16th centuries according to geographers]. Ikosim (in French). 5 (1): 163–175. doi:10.3917/ikos.005.0163. ISSN 2170-1016.
- Kasbadji, Selma (2021). Organisation urbaine du royaume des Banü Ziyyän : entités territoriales et réseaux urbains : XIIIe-XVIe siècles [Urban organization of the Kingdom of the Banü Ziyyän: territorial entities and urban networks: 13th-16th centuries] (in French). Université de Nantes. pp. 166–176.
- Mouassim, Younès (2023). "مدينة البطحاء دراسة تاريخية" [The city of Al-Batha - Historical study]. مجلة قبس للدراسات الإنسانية والاجتماعية (in Arabic). 7 (1): 313–329.
