= Oued Rhiou District =

Coordinates: 35.9667°N 0.9167°E

- District
- Interactive map of Oued Rhiou District
- Country: Algeria
- Province: Relizane Province
- Time zone: UTC+1 (CET)

Oued Rhiou District is a district of Relizane Province, Algeria.

The district is further divided into 4 municipalities:

- Lahlef
- Merdja Sidi Abed
- Ouarizane
- Oued Rhiou
