= El Matmar District =

Coordinates: 35°43′51″N 0°27′42″E

- District
- Interactive map of El Matmar District
- Country: Algeria
- Province: Relizane Province
- Time zone: UTC+1 (CET)

El Matmar District is a district of Relizane Province, Algeria.

The district is further divided into 4 municipalities:

- El Matmar
- Belassel Bouzegza
- Sidi Khettab
- Sidi M'hamed Benaouda
