= Patriots (Algeria) =

- Patriotes
- Founders: Redha Malek; Salim Saadi
- Military leader: Commander Azzedine
- Founded: 1994
- Dates active: 1993-2000
- Dissolved: 1999
- Merged into: Algerian government
- Allegiance: Algerian government
- Size: 80,000 (1995-1999); 6,000 (2005)
- Wars: Algerian Civil War

The Patriots (French: Patriotes), sometimes called the resistance fighters or popular militias (Note: The Algerian government rejected the term militia. According to Mokdad Sifi in 1995, "Much to the chagrin of certain politicians removed from reality, there are no militias in Algeria, there are no mercenaries, there are only Algerians, old mujahideen, children of mujahideen, as well as patriots engaged in the security forces and the communal guard to defend the population against murder, theft, and rape.") (French: resistants; milices populaires) were a loosely-knit organization of pro-government civilian militias during the Algerian Civil War. The Patriots fought alongside Algerian forces against the Armed Islamic Group in areas that were hard to reach or inaccessible for the Algerian government.

The recruitment of volunteers for the Patriots began in 1994 under the government of Redha Malek, a staunch anti-Islamist and member of the hardline éradicateurs faction within the Algerian government. This plan was fully launched by Colonel Salim Saadi during a speech in Blida in March 1994. However, the plan for a government-backed militia was first envisioned by General Mohammed Touati in an article in the army magazine El Djeich, where Touati argued the government should "involve civil society in the fight against terrorism," by creating a "paramilitary self-defense corps led by former mujahideen or ex-military personnel."

== History ==
The idea of forming a pro-government "people's militia" began in Oran during the funeral of Abdelkader Alloula on March 16, 1994, several days after he had been assassinated by Armed Islamic Group (GIA) militants. The first Patriots militias formed in the mountains of Kabylia, spurred by local leaders of the Rally for Culture and Democracy (RCD) and Berber Cultural Movement (MCB) as the only way to defend against the GIA.

Two types of pro-government militias emerged. The first group, based primarily in Kabylia, were the armed wings of local political parties. These groups were often tolerated by the Algerian government, but were not under their control and often coalesced as a result of an Islamist attack. The kidnapping of Kabylian singer Lounès Matoub in 1994 justified the existence of these groups. These self-defense groups were tasked with defending the entrances and exits of their villages.

The second group was more integrated with the government. These militias worked with the gendarmerie, and were equipped by the Algerian government. These groups were made up of the family members of those killed by Islamists, or people threatened by the Islamists themselves. These militants were backed by the National Organization for Mujahideen. Many government-backed Patriots worked alongside the Rural Guards, groups of veterans from the Algerian War of Independence who returned to service against the GIA, including Commander Azzedine's group of 400 fighters.

Over 80,000 Patriots were reportedly recruited between 1994 and 1999 for a salary three times that of the country's minimum wage. Between 1995 and 1997, a group of Patriots led by the presidents of the Relizane municipal councils Djidioua and El H'Madna were arrested for carrying out the kidnappings and murders of people they considered terrorists. Mass graves were discovered in the areas where these commanders operated.

== Dissolution ==
The dissolution of the Patriots came into effect after the 1999 Algerian Civil Concord referendum that gave amnesty to all Islamist fighters in 2000. Many disarmed Patriots reorganized themselves as the Coordination of Algerian Patriots for a Legitimate Defense (CPALD), but the CPALD was prevented by Algerian authorities from being established. By 2005, only about 6,000 Patriots were active, mostly in areas were the GIA's successor group, the Salafist Group for Preaching and Combat (GSPC) was present. Most of these fighters were integrated into Algerian state agencies like Sonelgaz, the National Rural and Agricultural Development Program, local gendarmeries, and the forest service.
