= Ain Tarik District =

Ain Tarik District دائرة عين طارق
- District
- Map of Algeria highlighting Relizane Province
- Coordinates: 35°46′N 1°7′E
- Country: Algeria
- Province: Relizane
- District seat: Ain Tarik

Area
  - Total: 322 km^{2} (124 sq mi)

Population (2002)
  - Total: 19,160
  - Density: 59.5/km^{2} (154/sq mi)
- Time zone: UTC+01 (CET)
- District code: 48015
- Municipalities: 2

Ain Tarik (Arabic: عين طارق) is a district located in the southeast of Relizane Province, Algeria. The District of Ain Tarik consists of two municipalities: Ain Tarik and Had Chakkala. According to a population census from 2002, the district exceeded 19,000 people. The district covers 322 km^{2}.

== Geography ==
The district is bordered by Ammi Moussa District to the north and west, Ramka District to the east, as well as Tiaret Province and Tissemsilt Province to the south and southeast.

Ain Tarik is surrounded by Bourokba (بوركبة) and El-Aria (العرية) mountains from the east, Ouled Bouriah (أولاد بورياح) mountains from the west, and El-Aria (العرية) and Malouia (ملوية) from the south. The river Oued Rhiou flows northward into Chlef river. The district occupies 322 km^{2} (124.325 sq mi).

== Climate ==
Ain Tarik region enjoys a Mediterranean Climate which is warm, dry summers and mild, rainy winters with snow at upper elevations. In the summer, the temperature may reach 40 degrees Celsius with hot and dry winds blowing in from the Sahara desert. In winter, temperatures may reach freezing point. Annual precipitation ranges from 250 mm to 500 mm.

== Education ==
There are many elementary schools within Ain Tarik District. Furthermore, there are three secondary schools and one high school.

Secondary schools: Mohamed Boudiaf (Ain Tarik), Rabeh Douis (Marioua), Malek Bennabi (Boughidane)

High school: Mohamed Bendjamaa (Ain Tarik)

Professional and technical training center - CFPA (Ain Tarik)

== Municipalities ==
Ain Tarik District consists of two municipalities:

- Ain Tarik
- Had Echkalla
