= Djidiouia District =

Coordinates: 35°55′46″N 0°49′50″E

- District
- Interactive map of Djidiouia District
- Country: Algeria
- Province: Relizane Province
- Time zone: UTC+1 (CET)

Djidiouia District is a district of Relizane Province, Algeria.

The district is further divided into 3 municipalities:

- Djidioua
- Hamri
- Ouled Sidi Mihoub
