= Sidi M'Hamed (disambiguation) =

Sidi M'Hamed may refer to:

== People ==
- Sidi M'hamed Bou Qobrine, an Algerian theologian and Sufi
- Sidi M'Hamed al-Ayachi, a Moroccan theologian and Sufi

== Places ==
- Sidi M'Hamed, a municipality in Algiers Province
- Sidi M'Hamed, a municipality in M'Sila Province
- Sidi M'hamed Bou Qobrine Cemetery, a cemetery in Algiers Province
- Sidi M'hamed Benaouda, a municipality in Relizane Province
- Sidi M'hamed Ben Ali, a municipality in Relizane Province
- Sidi M'Hamed District, a district in Algiers Province
- Sidi M'Hamed Ben Ali District, a district in Relizane Province
- Sidi M'Hamed Akhdim, a commune in El Jadida Province
