= Mass graves in Algeria =

Mass grave site

Mass graves in Algeria containing thousands of skeletons have been uncovered since the Algerian War. According to a source close to the Algerian People's National Army admitted that 3,030 Algerians were buried in unidentified graves during the Algerian Civil War. that killed according to Amnesty International up to 200,000 people. The biggest mass grave site in Algeria is located near Khenchela where over 984 remains were found in the area.

== Summary ==
=== During the Algerian War ===
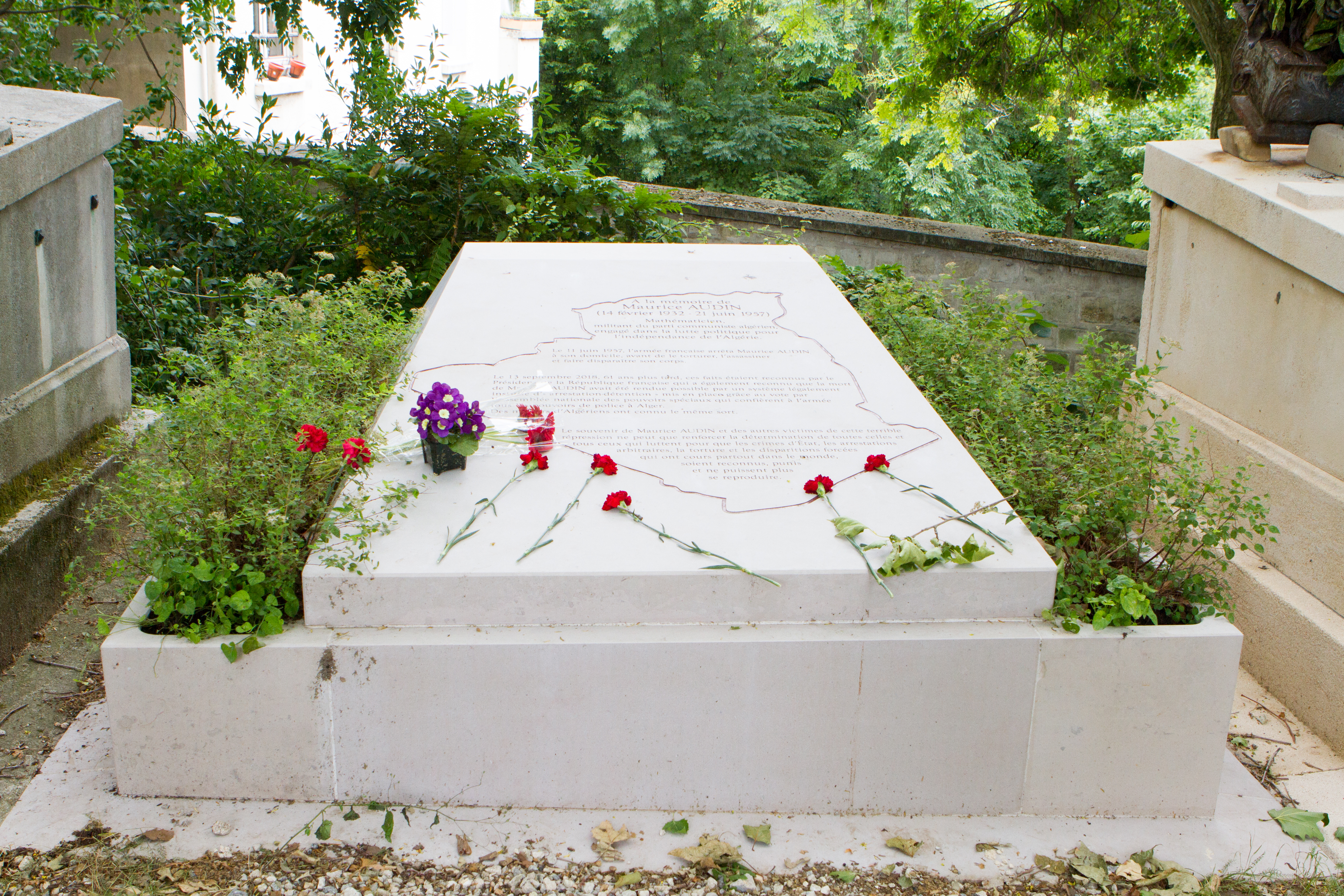
Cenotaph of Maurice Audin at the Père Lachaise Cemetery.

Over 2,200 Algerians are reported to have disappeared during the Algerian War, including Maurice Audin, Djillali Bounaama, M'hamed Bougara, Larbi Tbessi among others. On the French side over 3,000 were taken by Algerian fighters with 1700 remaining unidentified.

=== During the Black Decade ===
In a 2003 HRW report, Algerian daily newspapers recorded a number of mass graves during and after the Algerian Civil War. According to the same report, 7,000 people were arrested and disappeared between 1992 and 1998, the highest number of disappearances in the past decade except for wartime Bosnia. 4,950 admitted by the Minister of Interior to have disappeared though they claim "many have joined the Islamists or were snatched by them." According to HRW 7,000 to 20,000 disappearances were responsible by security officers and state-sponsored militias during the Algerian Civil War. There still remained dozens of mass graves in Algeria by July 2004.

==== Relizane mass grave affair ====
In 1998, Relizane Mayor Hadj Mohamed Fergane, Djidioua Mayor Mohamed Abed, and eight other militiamen were arrested and brought to the Oran military court, sued by Mohamed Smaïn, human rights activist and head of the Algerian League for the Defence of Human Rights (LAADH) in Relizane, he accused Mohamed Fergane and his men of having killed 93 civilians and abducting another 230, he named Colonel Abdelattef and Commander Saïdi two security officers who claimed that they had helped Fergane and his militia hide their grim deeds, however he was found not guilty despite testimonies, Smaïn also claimed that the reason the Military had been obstructing evidence was due to their involvement in masking these atrocities (through Saïdi and Abdelattef). On 6 February 2001 Smaïn, alerted the Algerian press to the discovery of a mass grave near the village of Sidi Mohamed Benaouda containing up to 212 victims he alleged were executed by the Gendarmerie Nationale and the militia loyal to Hadj Mohamed Fergane. The Arab journal Er-Ray immediately notified families in the region about the discovery.

Rather than investigating the killings, the authorities investigated Smaïn where he was sentenced on January 5th 2002 to 2 months in prison and a fine of 5,000 DZD and damages of 30,000 DZD to each of the 9 plaintiffs accumulating to a total of 275,000 DZD, he appealed and his sentence was increased to one year in prison.

The mass grave was investigated once again by Mohamed Smaïn in January 2004, where he had found a lighter belonging to a man identified as Saidane Abed, his son (whose name is also Mohamed Abed) said in an interview that his father was taken by Mohamed Fergane and his men in a vehicle belonging to the Relizane local administration at nine o'clock on 9 September 1996, after which he was never seen again. Smaïn would take this to the nearest court in Oued Rhiou where they ordered that police investigate the mass grave. On 11 January 2004, police failed to come to investigate, by the next day when Smaïn accompanied police to investigate, they found that the remains had disappeared. Smaïn claimed that the police "wanted to remove everything." At the age of 70, Mohamed Smaïn was once again arrested in 2012, due to defamation lawsuits against him following his discovery of these mass graves, where it had caused international outcry, leading to a condemnation from the Special Rapporteur on Human Rights Defenders in Africa in August 2012.

==== Impediments to investigation ====
Between 2007 and 2014, the UN Human Rights Committee issued approximately 20 condemnations against Algeria for the enforced disappearances committed during the Civil War, in each case it found Algeria guilty of multiple violations including the right to life, to freedom and to not be subjected to torture. Victims included: Djilali Larbi, Mohamed Lemmiz, Benattia Zerrougui, Nour-Eddine Mihoubi, Farid Faraoun and much more. Despite these condemnations, Algeria pursued a "policy of reconciliation", that entrenched impunity for gross human rights abuses, the laws declared that any complaint against security forces would be inadmissible, effectively granting blanket immunity to perpetrators. Algerian authorities have failed to disclose the procedures for preserving evidence and identifying human remains found at these sites. On many occasions, after a mass grave is discovered by Algerian press the authorities refuse to give any comment about it. Somoud demanded that Algerian authorities DNA test the bodies found in mass graves, but those requests were never answered.

On 16 March 2026, Algeria sealed off SOS Disparus' headquarters in Algeria due to a lack of administrative authorization, the decision was condemned by the United Nations. SOS Disparu director Fatima Yous mentioned in 2006 that she believed a number of the disappeared were buried in mass graves.

== Selected discoveries ==
=== Algerian War ===
- 1982 - Algeria found the remains of 984 bodies in the town of Khenchela in eastern Algeria. It is the largest mass grave ever found in Algeria.
- August 1985 - Algeria reports having found the remains of 57 Algerians in an abandoned Zinc mine dating to the Algerian War.
- April 2001 - Algeria reports having found a large mass grave involving over 330 in the town of Cheria, Tébessa Province dating back to the Algerian War of Independence with estimates as high as 600 bodies in the area, the grave covered over 1,000 square meters, the victims were supposedly shot by French SAS. The skeletons bore signs of torture.

=== Algerian Civil War ===
- 9 October 1997 - The Algerian army discovers 20 remains near Ouled Allel (Sidi Moussa) during an offensive against the GIA. They managed to kill two fundamentalist leaders and a score of their fighters.
- 26 November 1998 - Algeria reports the remains of an unknown amount of remains near the neighborhood of Haouch Hafiz in Les Eucalyptus.
- February 1999 - In Ouled Allel (Sidi Moussa) 70 bodies are pulled from a well.
- 12 May 1999 - 63 bodies found in another well in Haouch Vallonni (Larbaâ). The prosecutor for this case Salih Slimi mentioned that he had witnessed two other mass graves one in 1998 where two bodies were found and another in 1999 where five bodies were found.
- 20 May 1999 - August 2002 - Unspecified amount of remains found near Djelfa, Oued Allel (Boumerdès), Boumerdès, Tiaret, and Saïd Gassem (Baraki).
- 2001 - 2004 - 212 remains near Relizane, reported by Algerian human activist Mohamed Smaïn, erased.
