= Al Jabal =

Al Jabal الجبل (Arabic) ⴰⵍ ⵊⴰⴱⴰⵍ (Berber)
- Town
- Location within Algeria
- Coordinates: 35°33′12″N 0°21′38″E
- Country: Algeria
- Province: Mascara Province

Al Jabal (Amazigh : ⴰⵍ ⵊⴰⴱⴰⵍ, Arabic : الجبل) is a historic mountain village in Mascara Province, northwestern Algeria. Located in a strategic position in the Djebel Bargar, south of the Qal'a of the Beni Rached and of the city of Yellel (L'Hillil), it was founded by the Banu Masala, a Huwwara Berber emirate rebel to the Rustamid Kingdom during the 9th century. The city of Al Jabal reportedly was the residence of the Banu Masala. Following the fall of the emirate in 910-911, when Huwwara tribes converted to Ismailism under pressure from the Fatimids, the city lost importance and remains a simple Berber village today.
