= El Hassi =

El Hassi may refer to:

- El Hassi, Batna, a municipality or commune of Batna province, Algeria
- El Hassi, Relizane, a municipality or commune of Relizane province, Algeria
