= Sidi M'Hamed Benali District =

Coordinates: 36°08′36″N 0°50′36″E

- District
- Interactive map of Sidi M'Hamed Benali District
- Country: Algeria
- Province: Relizane Province
- Time zone: UTC+1 (CET)

Sidi M'Hamed Benali District is a district of Relizane Province, Algeria.

The district is further divided into 3 municipalities:

- Sidi M'hamed Benali
- Beni Zentis
- Mediouna
