= Mehdi Mostefa =

Algerian professional footballer (born 1983)

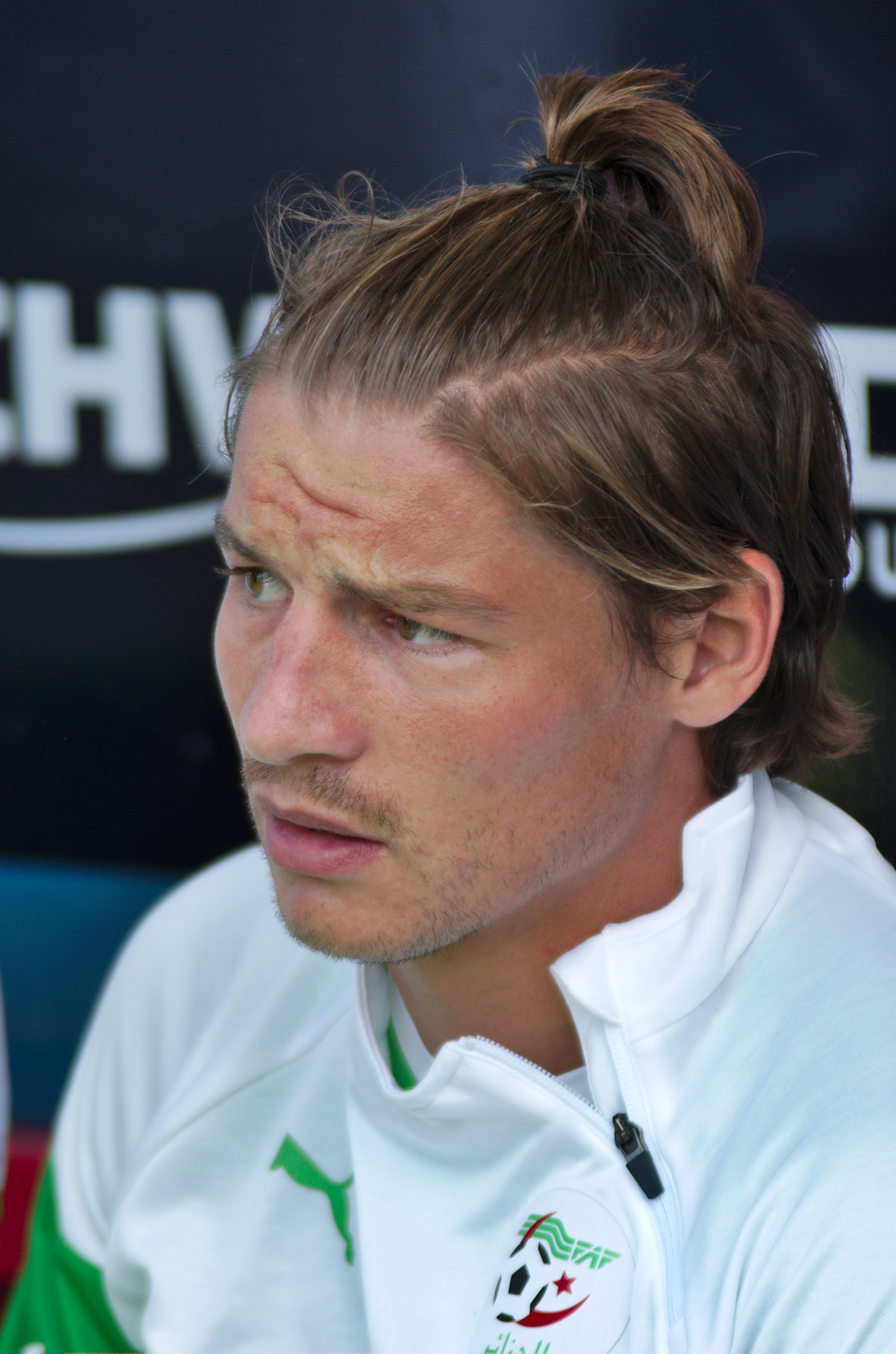
- Mostefa in 2014

Personal information
- Full name: Mehdi Mostefa Sbaa
- Date of birth: 30 August 1983 (age 43)
- Place of birth: Dijon, France
- Height: 1.81 m (5 ft 11 in)
- Position: Defensive midfielder

Youth career
- 1994–1997: Fontaine-les-Dijon FC
- 1997–1998: Dijon
- 1998–2003: Monaco

Senior career*
Years	Team	Apps	(Gls)
2004–2005	Valence	37	(1)
2005–2006	Montluçon		
2006–2007	Sète	31	(4)
2007–2011	Nîmes	104	(6)
2011–2014	Ajaccio	101	(7)
2014–2015	Lorient	24	(1)
2015–2017	Bastia	56	(0)
2017–2018	Pafos	22	(0)
2018–2023	Béziers	63	(2)

International career
2010–2014	Algeria	25	(0)
- * Club domestic league appearances and goals

Mehdi Mostefa Sbaa (Arabic: مهدي مصطفى سبع; born 30 August 1983) is a former professional footballer who played as a defensive midfielder. Born in France, he played for the Algeria national team.

== Personal life ==
Mostefa was born in Dijon, France, to an Algerian father and a French mother. His father is originally from the town of Mazouna in the Relizane Province in Algeria.

== Club career ==
On 6 June 2011, Mostefa signed a two years contract with newly promoted Ligue 1 side AC Ajaccio.

On 7 August 2014, Mostefa moved to FC Lorient for a three years contract because he's interested with the club project.

On 27 August 2015, Bastia reached an agreement with Lorient to sign Mostefa.

== International career ==
On 30 October 2010, Mostefa was called up to the Algeria national team by head coach Abdelhak Benchikha for a friendly against Luxembourg. He made his debut in that game as a starter, before being substituted off in the 69th minute. On 30 March 2011, Mostefa played his first official match for Algeria in a 2012 Africa Cup of Nations qualifier against Morocco. He played the entire match as Algeria went on to win 1–0.
