= Ammi Moussa District =

Coordinates: 35°52′N 1°07′E

- District
- Interactive map of Ammi Moussa District
- Country: Algeria
- Province: Relizane Province
- Time zone: UTC+1 (CET)

Ammi Moussa District is a district of Relizane Province, Algeria.

The district is further divided into 4 municipalities:

- Ammi Moussa
- El Hassi
- El Ouldja
- Ouled Aiche
