= Mendes District =

Coordinates: 35°38′59″N 0°51′43″E

- District
- Interactive map of Mendes District
- Country: Algeria
- Province: Relizane Province
- Time zone: UTC+1 (CET)

Mendes District is a district of Relizane Province, Algeria.

The district is further divided into 3 municipalities:

- Mendes
- Oued Essalem
- Sidi Lazreg
