= Zemmoura District =

Coordinates: 35°43′N 0°45′E

- District
- Interactive map of Zemmoura District
- Country: Algeria
- Province: Relizane Province
- Time zone: UTC+1 (CET)

Zemmoura District is a district of Relizane Province, Algeria.

The district is further divided into 3 municipalities:

- Zemmoura
- Beni Dergoun
- Dar Ben Abdellah
