= Ballene praesidium =

Locality in Algeria

- Roman Empire - Mauretania Caesariensis (125 AD)
- Location: Algeria

Site notes
- Area: Yellel

Ballene praesidium or Baliana is a locality in Algeria, North Africa. located at 35° 43' 19" North, 0° 21' 13" East. in Relizane Province, Algeria. Relizane Township, is 31.2 km

away.

== History ==
During the Roman Empire a town called Baliana stood here. Baliana was also the seat of an ancient Christian bishopric, which exists today as a titular see of the Roman Catholic Church.

Shrines to Sidi Ali Ben Messaoud (2.7 km) and Koubbet Sidi Abd el Kader are also at the town.

== See also ==
=== Related articles ===
- Mauretania Caesariensis
- List of cultural assets of Algeria
