= Mediouna =

Mediouna may refer to:

- Mediouna, Algeria
- Mediouna, Morocco
