= Oued Essalem =

Coordinates: 35°35′N 0°55′E

Oued Essalem وادي السلام
- Commune and town
- Interactive map of Oued Essalem
- Country: Algeria
- Province: Relizane Province
- District: Mendes District

Area
  - Total: 292.95 km^{2} (113.11 sq mi)
- Elevation: 487 m (1,598 ft)

Population (2008)
  - Total: 9,319
  - Density: 32/km^{2} (83/sq mi)
- 3731 in the main settlement, and 5588 in rest of the area of the commune
- Time zone: UTC+1 (CET)
- Postal code: 48175

Oued Essalem (in Arab وادي السلام) is a town and commune in Relizane Province, Algeria. According to the 2008 census, it has a population of 9319. It was previously named Henri Hoc under French colonization. The commune is located in the south-west of its province, it spans over 292.95 km^{2} and the Manesfa River passes through it, it is the largest commune by area of its district. It is linked by the RN23, and is a stop between the large cities of the west, Tiaret, Oran and Mostaganem, it also possesses a departemental road linking it with the town of Oued El Abtal. Located 100 km away from the Mediterranean Sea, Oued Essalem experiences a warm and dry climate, with a slight alpine tendency, its winters are often rainy, and snowfall can sometimes occur.
