= Wilaya of Relizane massacres of 30 December 1997 =

1997 mass killings during the Algerian Civil War

1997 Relizane massacres
- Part of Algerian Civil War
- Location: Relizane, Algeria
- Date: 30 December 1997
- Deaths: 272 to 412 villagers

The Wilaya of Relizane massacres of 30 December 1997 were probably the single bloodiest day of killing in the Algerian Civil War of the 1990s. Many residents of four villages were killed; the exact number of casualties has varied according to sources.

== Background ==
In 1998, Algeria was near the peak of a brutal civil war, which had begun after the military's cancellation of 1992 elections, which were about to be won by the Islamic Salvation Front (FIS). The arid, inaccessible, poor Ouarsenis Mountains, about 150 miles west of Algiers, had experienced little or no violence. In the 1997 elections, most inhabitants had voted for the pro-government FLN and RND.

On the first day of Ramadan, at about 6:15 pm, assailants, armed with axes and knives, swept down on four farming villages in the Ammi Moussa area, and killed hundreds of people as they sat down to break their fast:

- at Kherarba, or Ouled Kherarba, Khrouba or Khourba, 21 (officially) or 176 (Liberté) were killed;
- at Sahnoun, or Ouled Sahnoun, Ouled Sahnine, Ouled Sahrine or Ouled Sahnine, 29 or 113 were killed;
- at El-Abadel, or Al Abadel, 73 (Liberté), were killed;
- at Ouled-Tayeb, or Oulad Taieb, Ben Taïyeb or Douar Ouled Tayeb, 28 or 50 were killed.

The attackers killed families indiscriminately, including men, women, children and babies, in their homes; beheaded some; and butchered others. They threw babies over walls, reportedly even butchered dogs and livestock and left only at dawn. The assailants were dressed as "Afghans". Survivors were quoted in the Algerian press as identifying the leader of the assailants as Aoued Abdallah, called "Cheikh Noureddine", a western Algeria head of the Armed Islamic Group (GIA). Pamphlets were reportedly distributed in Algiers that announced, "We will arrive here soon. We have breakfasted in Algiers, we will dine in Oran. Signed - GIA". The massacres were followed shortly afterwards by the Wilaya of Relizane massacres of 4 January 1998; together, the events provoked a widespread exodus from the region.

The Algerian government told the UN Commission on Human Rights,(E/CN.4/2000/3/Add.1) "On 31 December 1997, a judicial inquiry was opened and on 8 February 1998 the examining magistrate ordered that further investigations be carried out. The legal proceedings continue".

== Reports of casualties ==
As a result of the massacre, 78 people (the initial official estimate), 252 people (according to Le Matin and El Watan, quoting hospital sources), 272 people (according to the Algerian government's statement to the UN Commission on Human Rights (E/CN.4/2000/3/Add.1) or 412 people (according to Liberté) were killed in four villages.

== See also ==
- List of Algerian massacres of the 1990s
- List of massacres in Algeria
