= Wilaya of Relizane massacres of 4 January 1998 =

Terrorist incident in Algeria

1998 Relizane massacres
- Part of Algerian Civil War
- Location: Oued Rhiou, Algeria
- Date: 4 January 1998
- Deaths: At least 172 villagers

The Wilaya of Relizane massacres of 4 January 1998 were massacres that took place in three remote villages around Oued Rhiou in Relizane Province, Algeria, during the Algerian conflict of the 1990s.

In the massacres on this date, the following numbers were recorded:

- at Had Chekala, at least 150 killed; no residents survived; more than 30 guerrillas burned the village down afterwards
- at Remka, initial reports claimed 117 killed; in 2006, Prime Minister Ahmed Ouyahia declared that the true toll had been 1000.
- at Ain Tarik, an unknown number were killed

The massacres were attributed to the GIA, an armed Islamist group, and had been preceded some days before by the Wilaya of Relizane massacres of 30 December 1997.

They resulted in a mass population flight from the afflicted area, and led to international condemnation and calls for an independent investigation. Algeria rejected an inquiry into the massacres, blaming the slaughters on Islamist guerrillas.

== See also ==
- List of massacres in Algeria
- List of Algerian massacres of the 1990s
