= El Ouldja =

El Ouldja may refer to the following places in Algeria:

- El Ouldja, Relizane
- El Ouldja, Sétif
