= Nouria Kazdarli =

Algerian actress (1921–2020)

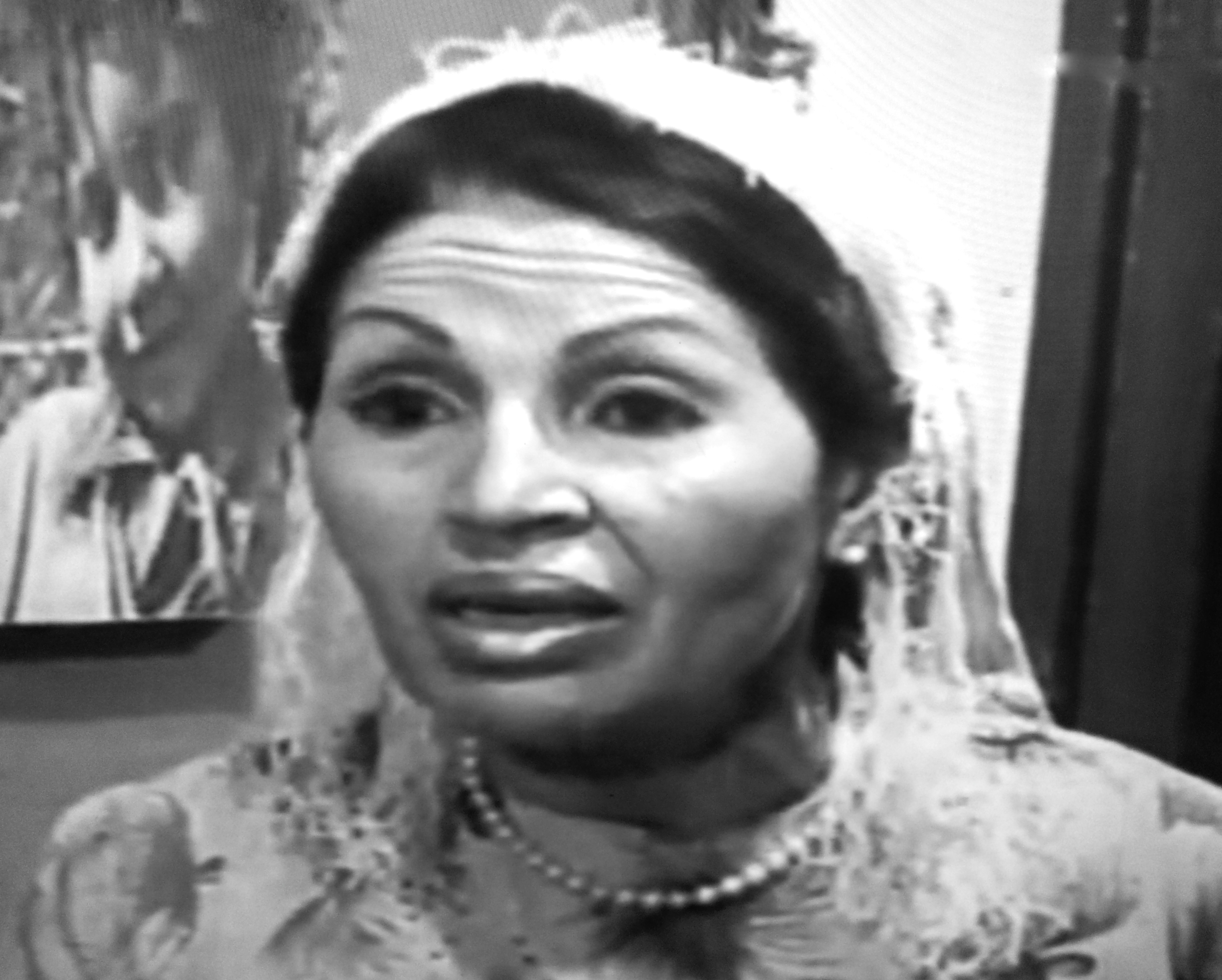
- Born: Khadidja Benaïda; 1921; Ammi Moussa, French Algeria
- Died: 9 August 2020 (aged 98–99)
- Occupation: Actress

Nouria Kazdarli, stage name of Khadidja Benaïda (1921 – 9 August 2020) was an Algerian actress. She was one of the largest names in theatre and small screen acting within Algeria.

== Biography ==
Kazdarli was born in Ammi Moussa in 1921 to a family from Tissemsilet, a region in the north-central part of Algeria. Shortly after her birth, the family moved to Mostaganem. Here, she met Mustapha Bouhrir, who went by the pseudonym of Mustapha Kazdarli, and the couple married in 1939 before settling in Algiers. Mustapha worked for Électricité et gaz d'Algérie while Nouria worked as a seamstress.

Mustapha Kazdarli discovered theatre while in Algiers, where he was introduced to a theatre troupe. Nouria Kazdarli quickly followed him to the troupe, joining him in 1945 while on a tour in Constantine. She adopted her husband's pseudonym of Kazdarli and changed her first name to Nouria, and subsequently asserted herself as a highly important actress.

Nouria Kazdarli died on 9 August 2020 at the age of 99.
