= Banu Masala =

Banu Masala or Aws was an ibadi Hawwara dynasty that split off from the Rustamids and formed a small state which controlled L'Hillil and al Jabal (around 15-20 km from L'Hillil).

== Establishment ==
The Rustamid imam, Abd Al wahhab married a young girl belonging to the Luwata tribe who was promised to the Aws chief, upon hearing of this the Aws chief marched with his tribe to Wadi huwwara (about 20 km west of Tahert) where the battle of Nahr ishlan against the Rustamids was fought however they were forced to retreat after suffering heavy losses. Despite this however they were able to maintain their independence. The Banu Masala then established Al Jabal as their capital.

== Capture of Tahert ==
Around 871/872, the Rustamid capital Tahert was occupied by a coalition of Hawwara and Luwata troops under Muhammad ibn Masala forcing the imam Abu bakr to leave. Soon however divisions arose between the two tribes and the Luwata were forced to leave the city and settled in a fort named Hisn Luwata south of Tahert after which they allied with Muhammad Abu l-Yaqzan.* Around 878/879 the Huwwara left Tahert after concluding a treaty with Abu l-Yaqzan.

== See also ==
- Rustamid dynasty
