= Mazouna District =

Coordinates: 36.1257°N 0.8765°E

- District
- Interactive map of Mazouna District
- Country: Algeria
- Province: Relizane Province
- Time zone: UTC+1 (CET)

Mazouna District is a district of Relizane Province, Algeria.

The district is further divided into 3 municipalities:

- Mazouna
- El Guettar
