= Zemmour =

Zemmour is a surname. Notable people with the surname include:

- Éric Zemmour (born 1958), French writer, journalist and politician
- Freddy Zemmour (born 1942), French footballer

== See also ==
- Ait Zemmour, Moroccan Berber tribe
- Beni Zemmour, Moroccan Arab tribe
- Guelta Zemmur, town in Western Sahara
- Tiris Zemmour Region, region of Mauritania
- Zemmoura, town in Algeria
