= Lazreg =

Lazreg is a surname, most commonly found in North Africa. Notable people with the surname include:

- Ahmed Lazreg (born 1934), Moroccan middle-distance runner
- Marnia Lazreg (1941–2024), Algerian academic

== See also ==
- Sidi Lazreg, a town in Relizane Province, Algeria
