= El Guettar =

El Guettar may refer to:

- El Guettar, Algeria, a town in Relizane Province, Algeria
- El Guettar, Tunisia, a town in Gafsa Governorate, Tunisia
  - Battle of El Guettar, engagement in World War II fought near the Tunisian town
