= Bendaoud =

- Commune and town
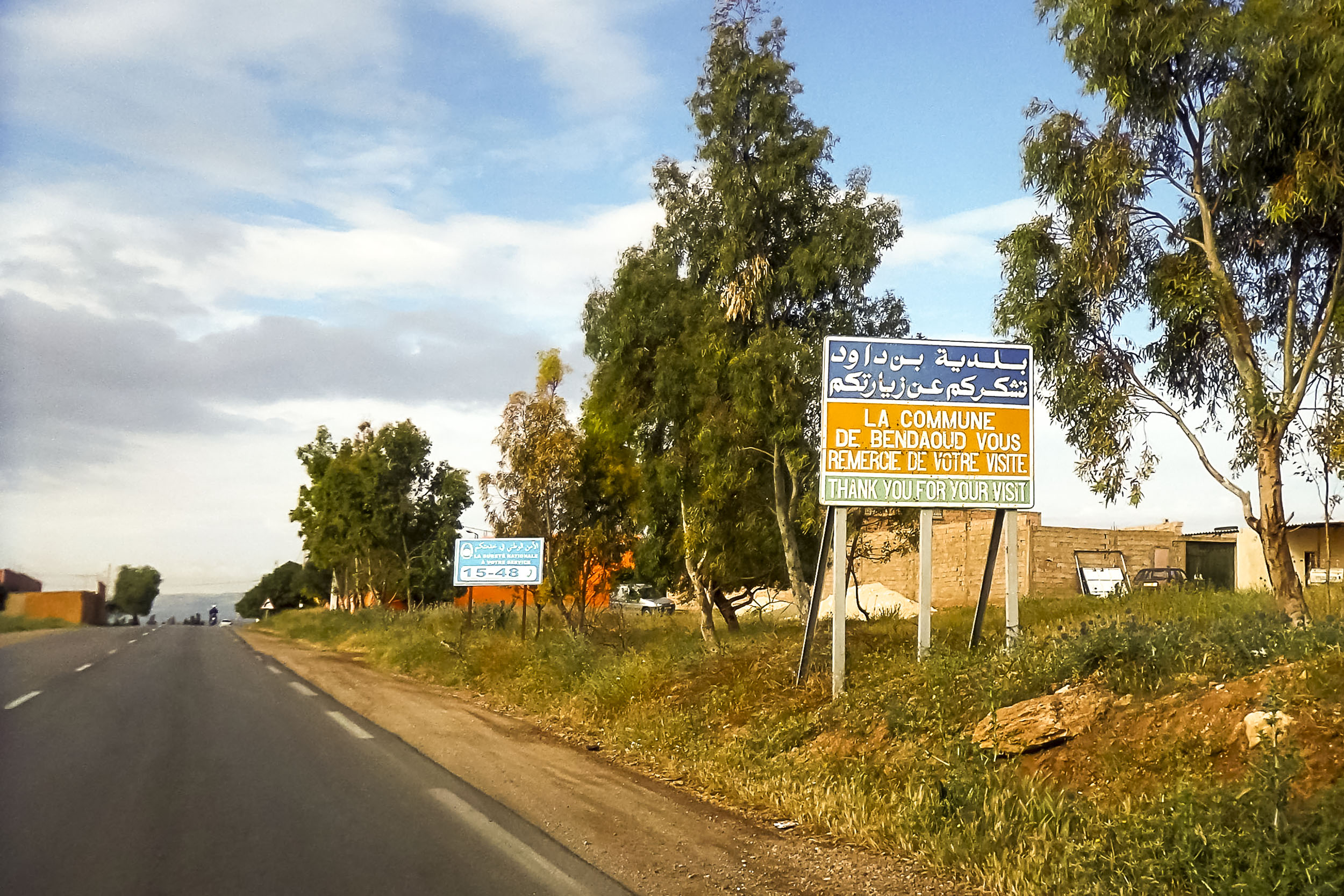

- Location within Algeria
- Coordinates: 35°43′09″N 0°31′13″E
- Country: Algeria
- Province: Relizane Province
- District: Relizane District

Population (2008)
  - Total: 17,953
- Time zone: UTC+1 (CET)

Bendaoud is a town and commune in Relizane Province, Algeria. According to the 2008 census it has a population of 17,953. It is located just to the southwest of Relizane.
