= Sahnoun =

Sahnoun or Sahnoune is a surname. Notable people with the surname include:

- Sahnun ibn Said at-Tanukhi (d. 854), Maliki jurist, author of the Mudawana.
- Omar Sahnoun (1955–1980), French footballer
- Mohamed Sahnoun, Algerian diplomat
- Nicolas Sahnoun, French footballer
- Mustapha Sahnoune, Algerian songwriter
- Oussama Sahnoune, Algerian swimmer
- Camélia Sahnoune, Algerian triple jumper
- Mehdi Sahnoune, French boxer

== See also ==
- a village in the Relizane Province
