= Mina (Relizane) =

Ancient city

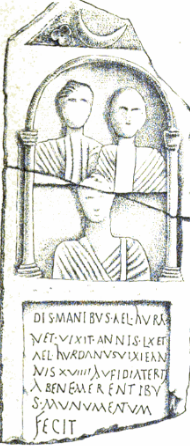
- Epitaph found in the ruins of Mina
- Location: Algéria
- Region: Relizane

Mina is one of the cities of Mauretania Caesarieansis., located west of the capital Caesarean. The site is 4 km from the city center of Relizane. and is located exactly in the new town of Adda Benaouda (Bourmadia). It was classified as an archaeological site by the Algerian Ministry of Culture and Arts in 2019.

== Geography ==
=== location ===
The city is situated amidst many important strategic points such as :

ّQuiza Xenitana
		north
Ballene praesidium	west	self	east	Cadum Kastra
		south
Frantassa

Map showing Mina in western Caesarean Mauretania around 150

== History ==
=== Numidian period ===
According to archaeological evidence, the city's existence dates back to the 2nd century BC. The Romans divided North Africa into provinces according to a specific policy aimed at strengthening their control over the region.

=== Roman period ===
The Romans divided North Africa into provinces according to a specific policy aimed at strengthening their control over the region. Mauretania Caesarea was the largest of these provinces, stretching from the Moulouya River to the Ampsaga River Valley. It was subject to the Romans immediately after Caligula's accession to power in 40 AD, and all its cities, including Mina, were dependent on the capital, Caesarea.

The city witnessed many important historical events, such as local revolutions and those opposed to the policies of the Roman emperors in North Africa. However, it experienced a golden age between the 2nd and 3rd centuries AD.

=== Vandal period ===
The city continued to exist until the end of the Vandal reign in North Africa. Many objects from excavations on the site, including a set of jewelry bearing witness to the Vandal settlement in the town, are integrated into the collections of the National Archaeology Museum of Saint-Germain-en-Laye.

== Religion ==
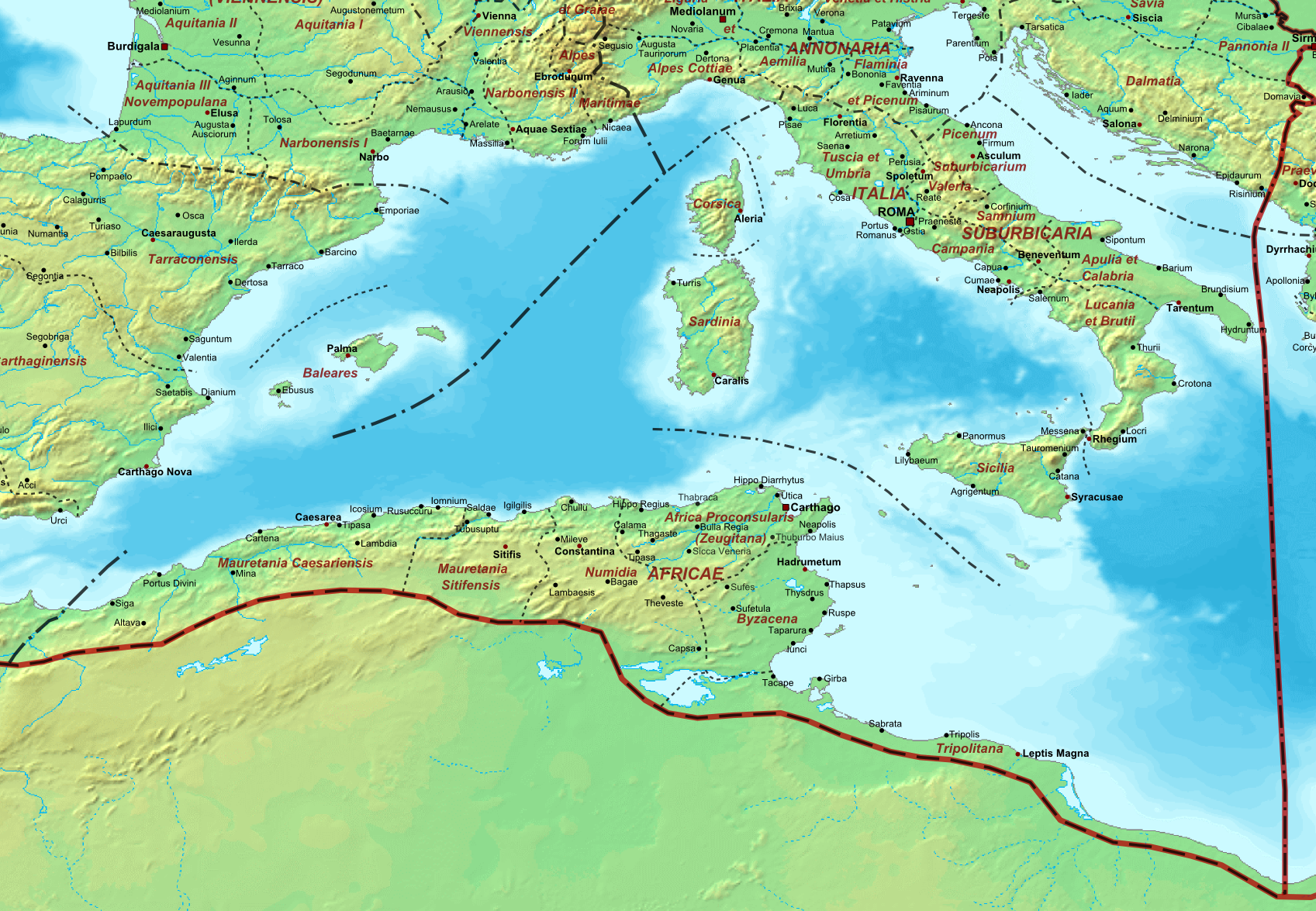
Diocese of Africa - AD 400

=== Christianity ===
In the 1st century AD, Christianity emerged as a new religion in Palestine, attracting a large number of followers, prompting the Romans to seek to eliminate Christ and his disciples. However, it spread rapidly to Anatolia, Egypt, and North Africa.

Between the 2nd and 3rd centuries AD, a diocese was established in the city before Constantinople adopted Christianity. Among the major Christian gatherings attended by the city's priests was the Council of Carthage in 484 and 525 during the Vandal period, which was the scene of violent revolts between local Arian and Donatist factions.

== Legacy ==
Many objects from the city of Mina are preserved in Algerian regional museums, such as the Ahmed Zabana Museum and the Abdelmadjid Meziane Museum in Chlef, but the most important archaeological collection is exhibited at the National Archeology Museum in Saint-Germain-en-Laye:. The most important artifacts collected there are:

1. 70 lamps;
2. 163 coins;
3. Funeral furniture from the tomb of a newborn buried in an amphora

== See also ==
- Numidia
- Mauretania Caesariensis
- List of cultural assets of Algeria
