= Aïn Djasser District =

Coordinates: 35°54′N 6°18′E

Aïn Djasser District دائرة عين جاسر
- District
- Country: Algeria
- Province: Batna Province
- District seat: Aïn Djasser

Area
  - Total: 73 sq mi (189 km^{2})

Population (2008)
  - Total: 23,694
  - Density: 325/sq mi (125/km^{2})
- Time zone: UTC+1 (CET)

Aïn Djasser District is a district of Batna Province, Algeria.

== Municipalities ==
The district further divides into two municipalities:

- Aïn Djasser
- El Hassi
