= Aïn Tarik =

Ain Tarik بلدية عين طارق
- Municipality
- Commune of Ain Tarik

- Location of Ain Tarik within Algeria
- Coordinates: 35°46′N 1°07′E
- Country: Algeria
- Province: Relizane
- District: Ain Tarik (seat)

Government
  - PMA Seats: 9

Area
  - Total: 178 km^{2} (69 sq mi)
- Elevation: 250 m (820 ft)

Population (2002)
  - Total: 12,287
  - Density: 69.0/km^{2} (179/sq mi)
- Time zone: UTC+01 (CET)
- Postal code: 48325
- ONS code: 48015

Ain Tarik (Arabic: عين طارق) is a municipality occupying 178 km^{2} located southeast of Relizane Province, Algeria. It is the district seat of Ain Tarik District. In 2002, its population was 12,287.

== History ==
French settlers arrived in the 1880s and built several administrative buildings in the area. They named the village Guillaumet, after Gustave Achille Guillaumet (1840–1887), a French orientalist painter. The location of the village was chosen because of its fertile lands and its strategic location among the three main tribes of the region: Meknessa, Chakkela, and Marioua. As many cities changed names after the independence of Algeria in 1962, the city was named Marioua (Arabic: مريوة) after a region located 5 km north of the city. In 1968 the name of the city changed to Ain Al-Hammam (Arabic: عين الحمام) after another location 3 km north of the present one. Since 1972 the municipality has been called Ain Tarik, in memory of the freedom-fighter Mujahid Adbul Arrahman, nicknamed Si Tarik. Ain Tarik can be translated to mean "location of Tarik."

Ain Tarik became a municipality in 1908. It was first under the jurisdiction of Oran Province then Mostaganem Province in 1957. After the reorganization of Algerian territory in 1984, the city became part of Relizane Province. During the Algerian War of Independence from 1954 to 1962, Ain Tarik was under the FLN commandment of Wilya five.

== Geography ==
Ain Tarik Municipality is located southeast of Relizane Province, midway between Algiers and Oran. It is located 250 km west of Algiers and 200 km east of Oran. It lies between four major cities, Tiaret 75 km to the south, Relizane 90 km to the northwest, Chlef 64 km to the northeast, and Tissemsilt 72 km to the south. The municipality covers 178 km ^{2} (68.726 sq mi) with an urban area of 34 km^{2} (13.127 sq mi). The city of Ain Tarik lies 250m above sea level.

== Neighborhoods ==
The city consists of many neighborhoods: Downtown, Sinistre, Chtaibou, and Douar. The commercial core is concentrated in the downtown area on both sides of the main street which is the N90; however, many shops can be found in surrounding neighborhoods.

== Education ==
The education in Ain Tarik is delivered through an elementary school, a secondary school, a high school, and a professional training center. The success rate in the Baccalaureat test in 2007 and 2008 were 59.6% and 70% respectively.

== Sport ==
Ain Tarik is home to ARAT soccer team which plays at the municipality stadium. The team participates in the Regional 3 Group A soccer division. Furthermore, many school clubs in various sports participate in regional and national competitions. in 2006, the girls handball team of En-Nasr elementary school won the national competition by beating Bordj Bou Arreridj team 18–9.
