= Hamri (Algeria) =

- Commune and town

- Location within Algeria
- Coordinates: 36°1′16″N 0°41′57″E
- Country: Algeria
- Province: Relizane Province
- Time zone: UTC+1 (CET)

Hamri is a town and commune in Relizane Province, Algeria.
