= Ramka =

Coordinates: 35°52′N 1°17′E

Ramla
- Commune and town
- Interactive map of Ramla
- Country: Algeria
- Province: Relizane Province
- Time zone: UTC+1 (CET)

Ramla is a town and commune in Relizane Province, Algeria.

== See also ==
- Ramka District
