= El H'Madna District =

Coordinates: 35.9000°N 0.7500°E

- District
- Interactive map of El H'Madna District
- Country: Algeria
- Province: Relizane Province
- Time zone: UTC+1 (CET)

El H'Madna District is a district of Relizane Province, Algeria.

The district is further divided into 2 municipalities:

- El Hamadna
- Oued El Djemaa
