= Aïn Djasser =

Aïn Djasser عين جاسر
- Town
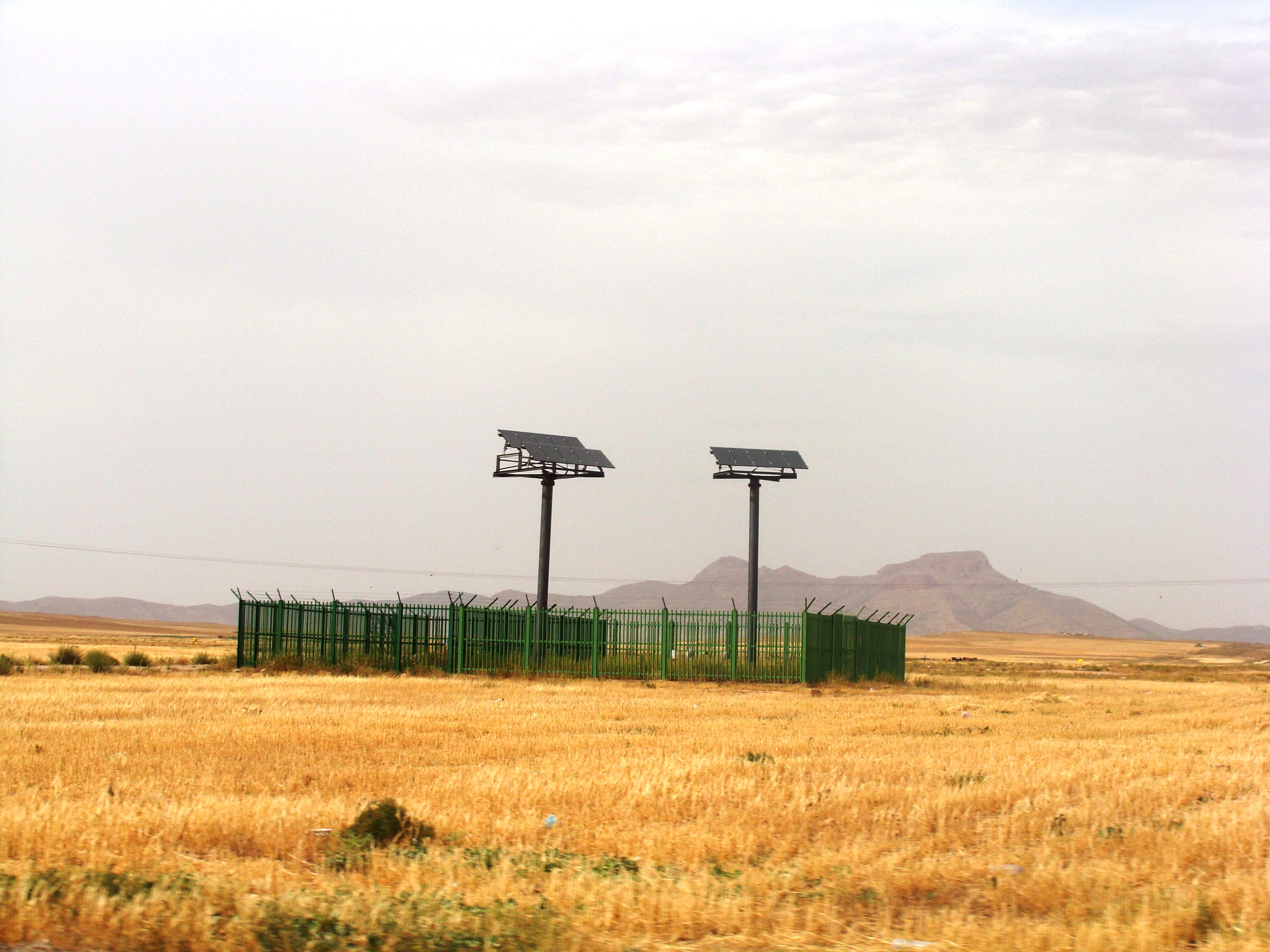
- Nickname: ESSABT BEN GHZAL
- Location of Ain Djasser within Batna Province

- Location of Ain Djasser within Algeria
- Coordinates: 35°34′N 6°18′E
- Country: Algeria
- Province: Batna
- District: Aïn Djasser

Area
  - Total: 129 km^{2} (50 sq mi)

Population (2008)
  - Total: 15,704
  - Density: 122/km^{2} (315/sq mi)
- Time zone: UTC+1 (West Africa Time)
- Climate: BSk

Aïn Djasser is a town in north-eastern Algeria. It is in Batna Province, region Aurès.

== Localities of the commune ==
The commune of Aïn Djasser is composed of 6 localities:

- Aïn Djasser Centre
- Aïn Oum El Djera
- Chouf Ghrab
- Chouk Sbaa
- Draa Klallouche
- Lefrada
- Massika (Cité Nadjah)
- Ouled Amor Tebalgha
- Ouled Si Abderrahmane
- Ziza
