= Mazouna =

- Commune and town
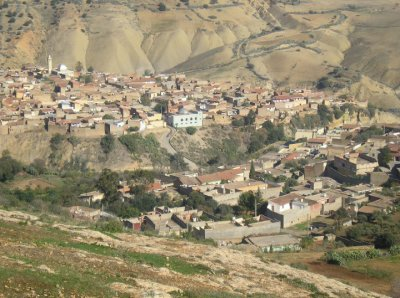
- Mazouna
- Nickname: Capital of Dahra

- Location within Algeria
- Coordinates: 36°7′32″N 0°52′35″E
- Country: Algeria
- Province: Relizane Province
- Time zone: UTC+1 (CET)
- Postal code: 48200

Mazouna is a town and commune in Relizane Province, Algeria. It was once the capital of the Ottomans' western province. It is known for its vintage mosque, Elzawya, which played the role of a well-respected school for teaching the Quran.
