= Sidi Khettab =

Coordinates: 35°55′N 0°31′E

- Commune and town
- Interactive map of Sidi Khettab
- Country: Algeria
- Province: Relizane Province
- Time zone: UTC+1 (CET)

Sidi Khettab is a town and commune in Relizane Province, Algeria.
