= Ouarizane =

Coordinates: 36°03′N 0°54′E

- Commune and town
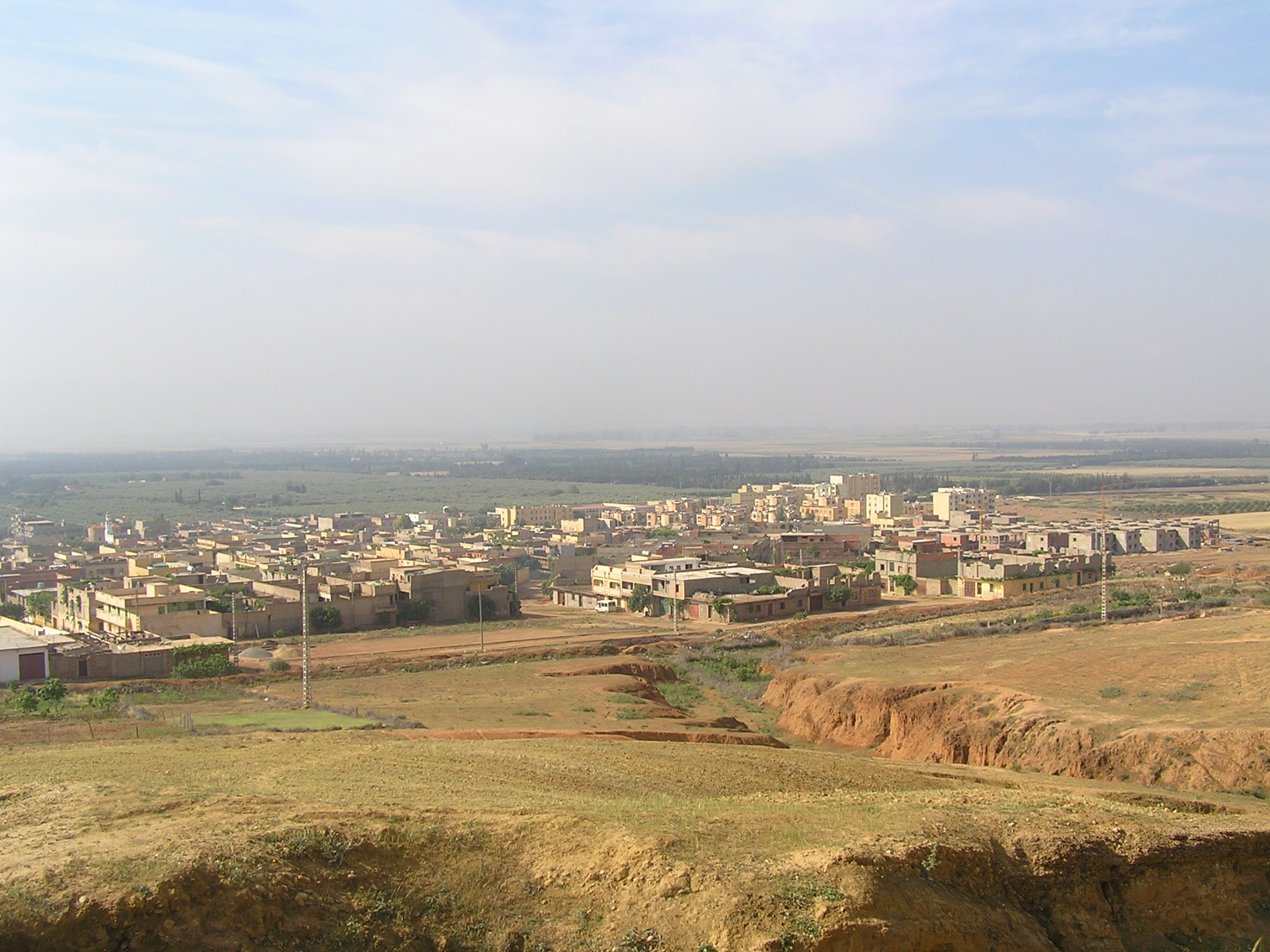

- Country: Algeria
- Province: Relizane Province
- Time zone: UTC+1 (CET)

Ouarizane is a town and commune in Relizane Province, Algeria.
