= Beni Dergoun =

Coordinates: 35°46′48″N 0°48′00″E

- Commune and town
- Interactive map of Beni Dergoun
- Country: Algeria
- Province: Relizane Province
- Time zone: UTC+1 (CET)

Beni Dergoun is a town and commune in Relizane Province, Algeria.
