= Ouled Sidi Mihoub =

Coordinates: 35°58′26″N 0°41′30″E

- Commune and town
- Interactive map of Ouled Sidi Mihoub
- Country: Algeria
- Province: Relizane Province
- Time zone: UTC+1 (CET)

Ouled Sidi Mihoub is a town and commune in Relizane Province, Algeria.
