= Ramka District =

Coordinates: 35°51′20″N 1°19′56″E

- District
- Interactive map of Ramka District
- Country: Algeria
- Province: Relizane Province
- Time zone: UTC+1 (CET)

Ramka District is a district of Relizane Province, Algeria.

The district is further divided into 2 municipalities:

- Ramka
- Souk El Had
