= Ouled Aiche =

Coordinates: 35°49′35″N 0°57′40″E

- Commune and town
- Interactive map of Ouled Aiche
- Country: Algeria
- Province: Relizane Province
- Time zone: UTC+1 (CET)

Ouled Aiche is a town and commune in Relizane Province, Algeria.
