= Lahlef =

Coordinates: 35°54′N 0°59′E

- Commune and town
- Interactive map of Lahlef
- Country: Algeria
- Province: Relizane Province
- Time zone: UTC+1 (CET)

Lahlef is a town and commune in Relizane Province, Algeria.
