= Sidi Saada =

Coordinates: 35°40′40″N 0°20′32″E

- Commune and town
- Interactive map of Sidi Saada
- Country: Algeria
- Province: Relizane Province
- Time zone: UTC+1 (CET)

Sidi Saada is a town and commune in Relizane Province, Algeria.
