= Oued El Djemaa =

Coordinates: 35°47′50″N 0°40′53″E

- Commune and town
- Country: Algeria
- Province: Relizane Province

Area
  - Total: 69.44 sq mi (179.85 km^{2})

Population (2008)
  - Total: 23,480
- Time zone: UTC+1 (CET)

Oued El Djemaa (River of the Friday market in Arabic ) is a town and commune in Relizane Province, Algeria.
