= El Hassi, Batna =

Coordinates: 36°11′N 5°27′E

El Hassi الحاسى
- Country: Algeria
- Province: Batna
- District: Aïn Djasser

Area
  - Total: 60 km^{2} (23 sq mi)

Population (2008)
  - Total: 7,990
  - Density: 130/km^{2} (340/sq mi)
- Time zone: UTC+1 (West Africa Time)

El Hassi is a town in north-eastern Algeria.

== Localities of the commune ==
The commune of El Hassi is composed of 11 localities:

- Braoula
- Ouled Hassi
- Tamahrit
- El Djabass
- Guabel Messaouda
- Ouled Bouchareb
- Ouled Zerira
- Ouled Yaich
- Ouled Merah
- Ouled Fercha
- Hanfoug
