= Belassel Bouzegza =

Coordinates: 35°50′26″N 0°29′56″E

- Commune and town
- Interactive map of Belassel Bouzegza
- Country: Algeria
- Province: Relizane Province
- Time zone: UTC+1 (CET)

Belassel Bouzegza is a town and commune in Relizane Province, Algeria.
