= Dar Ben Abdellah =

Coordinates: 35°42′N 0°41′E

- Commune and town
- Interactive map of Dar Ben Abdellah
- Country: Algeria
- Province: Relizane Province
- Time zone: UTC+1 (CET)

Dar Ben Abdellah is a town and commune in Relizane Province, Algeria.
