= Relizane District =

Coordinates: 35.7333°N 0.5500°E

- District
- Interactive map of Relizane District
- Country: Algeria
- Province: Relizane Province
- Time zone: UTC+1 (CET)

Relizane District is a district of Relizane Province, Algeria.

The district is further divided into 2 municipalities:

- Relizane
- Bendaoud

The city is mainly based on the Flittas, a descendant of the Arab Hilal.
