= Had Echkalla =

Coordinates: 35°40′45″N 1°08′50″E

- Commune and town
- Country: Algeria
- Province: Relizane Province
- Time zone: UTC+1 (CET)

Had Echkalla is a town and commune in Relizane Province, Algeria.
