= Mubarek al-Mili =

Algerian scholar and reformist

Mubarek bin Muhammed Ibrahimi el Mili
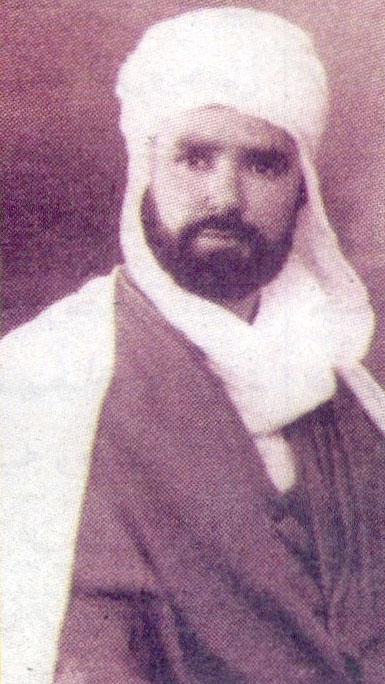
- Born: 26 May 1896/1898; Ghebala, Jijel, Algeria
- Died: 9 February 1945 (47 or 49 years old); Al-Milia
- Education: Ez-Zitouna University
- Board member of: Association of Algerian Muslim Ulema

Mebarek el Mili (Arabic:مبارك الميلي), known as El Mili, was an Algerian reformist who became active during the French occupation of Algeria. He was also a prominent member of the Association of Algerian Muslim Ulema.

== Early life and education ==
He is Sheikh Mubarek Bin Mohammed Ibrahimi el Mili who was born in Mechta Dria Romane located in the municipality of ghebala, the state of Jijel Settara District in the eastern region of Algeria. He was born on 26 May 1896. Some resources say he was born in 1898. His father died when he was 4, so his grandfather became his caretaker, then his uncles.

He started his education in Ouled Mubarek in El Milia under the care of Sheikh Ahmed Bin Taher Mezhoud until he finished memorizing the Quran. He then moved to Mila, which was a big scientific town back then, and continued his education there in Sidi Azzouz mosque with Sheikh al-mu'allam el Mili Bin Mansser before even passing the age of twelve. He says he descends from the sons of Mubarek Bin Ḥabbās from ethbij, the Hilali Arabs, who are one of the few Arab tribes from the Jijel area. His ideas were distinctive as well as against sorcery and superstitions. He struggled with diabetes in 1933, and then died in 1945.

== Era and environment ==
Mubarek el Mili witnessed the French occupation, which had already been around for a hundred years. The French used to think that they beat the Algerians by conquering the revolutions and the uprisings, which used to happen regularly. That was apparent during the celebrations in 1930 which were happening as the 100th anniversary of their occupation. The occupation thought that the Algerian colony had entered the realms of the French civilization with no return. A group of Algerians then formed a new front in the peaceful political resistance, and the ideas of that generation formed by establishing organizations like "Étoile Nord-Africaine" or the Prince Khalid movement who is Prince Abdelkader's grandchild, or other organizations such as the Association of Muslim Ulema. Each of these organizations, regardless of their methods, had the same goals, the most important one being to protect the Islamic Algerian nationality, and its diverse Arab culture against the French Scheme that was persistent in erasing every Arab Muslim in Algeria in several ways.

== Return to Algeria and reform work ==
El Mili continued his education in Sheikh Mohammed Bin Mansser el Mili's school in the town of Mila. He, later on, went to the capital of western Algeria Constantine where he joined The Green Mosque to continue his education with Imam Abdelhamid Bin Badis, where he was one of his best students. After that, he headed towards Ez-Zitouna University in Tunisia where he stayed until he received the highest degree there in 1924. He then went back to Algeria in 1925 where he settled in Constantine teaching students in a modern Quranic school which was located near "Al-Shihāb" newspaper that was founded by Sheikh Bin Badis. Around 1927, El Mili opened a new school after a request from the citizens of the city Laghouat, intending to teach the Algerian kids in new modern approaches, free from all of the backward ideas, which were filled with all types of sorcery and superstitions that were popular back then. The people liked his unique constructive style of teaching. His impact started to grow on people. He saw a welcoming environment that was eager to learn about his ideas which preach about repairing society and escape all the ties of sorcery and superstitions that were circling back then between scholars. He also left the Sufi ways which he thought had no point to. He established the first football club in the city, as well as charities to help out young men. The French authorities and some of the Sufi leaders did not disregard his activities that posed an annoyance on them. They ordered him to leave the city after 7 years of living there. After that, he headed to the city Bou Saada in Algeria, but he did not have the chance to even get started with his awareness activities, because he was quickly kicked out of there as well. He then returned to Mila and build a mosque there where he started preaching and teaching. he, later on, created an Islamic organization, which he used to speared his ideas and create a disturbance towards the occupation, the scientists and to scare the Sufis.

== Work in journalism ==
Sheikh Mubarek el Mili was active in his writing, especially in his newspaper articles, which were published in the Arabic speaking Algerian newspapers, such as "Al-Muntaqad newspaper", "Al-Shihāb", and "Al-Sunnah wa-al-Baṣā'ir" which he started managing after Sheikh Al-Ṭayyib Al-ʻUqabī in 1935. El Mili was distinguished for his strong clear style that was filled with the renewed urge against the miserable conditions of fellow Algerians, especially from the Islamic aspect. In 1937 he wrote a book titled "Risālat al-shirk wa-maẓāhiruh" and kept managing it in "Al-Baṣā'ir newspaper" until it was banned by the occupation with the start of the second world was in 1939.

== Association of Algerian Muslim Ulema ==
In 1931, Sheikh Mubarek el Mili helped with creating the "Association of Algerian Muslim Ulema". He was also voted to be a member of the Administrative office and the financial secretary from the first day. He was appointed manager for "Al-Baṣā'ir newspaper" in 1937, after Sheikh Al-Ṭayyib Al-ʻUqabī who resigned from managing the organization and its newspaper. He was assigned by the association to go to Laghouat where he taught in Atiq Mosque for 7 years and worked as a supervisor in the Shabiba School, which some students graduated from and played an important role in the reform plan afterward, like Abū Bakir al-Aghwātī, Aḥmad Būzayd Qaṣībah, and Ahmad Shaṭṭah. In 1933, Sheikh el Mili went back to Mila to continue his reformative efforts in the guidance and education field. Later on, when Sheikh Abdelhamid Bin Badis died in April 1940, Sheikh Mubarek el Mili took over teaching his lessons in Green Mosque in Constantine. Sheikh Mubarek el Mili made multiple trips through Algerian soil to check upon the people of the "Association of Algerian Muslim Ulema". He wrote about some of his trips in Western Algeria in 1936. He also traveled to France in 1938 on a scientific and medical job, where he met some of the representatives of the "Ulema" association in France, some of them being Saʻīd Ṣāliḥī, Saʻīd al-Baybānī, Muhammed al- Zāhī. (his hometown Settara, the state of Jijel not Mila).

== Published works ==
El Mili's published works include:

- Research articles which he wrote in "Al Jamʻīyah"
- Associationnisme et Sex Aspects
- Polytheism Message and its Manifestations (original title:Risālat al-shirk wa-maẓāhiruh), 2001
- Articles and Opinions of Scholars of Muslim Scholars' Association (original title:Maqālāt wa-ārāʼ ʻulamāʼ Jamʻīyat al-ʻUlamāʼ al-Muslimīn)
- The History of Alegeria in Ancient and Modern Times (original title:Tārīkh al-Jazāʻir fī al-qadīm wa-al-ḥadīth)

== Death ==
El Mili struggled with diabetes from 1933, and his state got worse when his Sheikh and friend Abdelhamid Ben Badis died. El Mili died on 9 February 1945 in Mila after he was moved there in a pitiful condition after his request.
