= Merdja Sidi Abed =

Coordinates: 36°00′12″N 1°00′37″E

- Commune and town
- Interactive map of Merdja Sidi Abed
- Country: Algeria
- Province: Relizane Province
- Time zone: UTC+1 (CET)

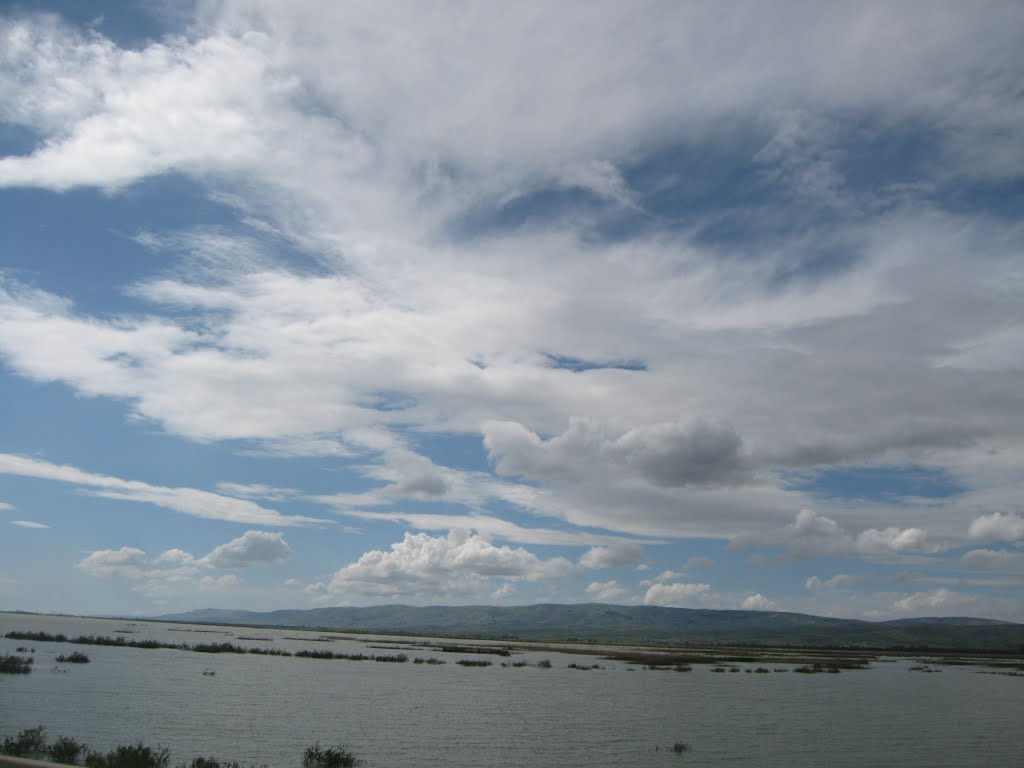

Merdja Sidi Abed is a town and commune in Relizane Province, Algeria.
