= Aïn Rahma =

Coordinates: 35°37′29″N 0°23′34″E

- Commune and town
- Interactive map of Aïn Rahma
- Country: Algeria
- Province: Relizane Province
- Time zone: UTC+1 (CET)

Aïn Rahma is a town and commune in Relizane Province, Algeria.
