= Mendes, Relizane =

Coordinates: 35°39′N 0°52′E

Mendes
- Commune and town
- Interactive map of Mendes
- Country: Algeria
- Province: Relizane Province
- Time zone: UTC+1 (CET)

Mendes is a town and commune in Relizane Province, Algeria.
