= Beni Zentis =

Coordinates: 36°06′41″N 0°39′49″E

- Commune and town
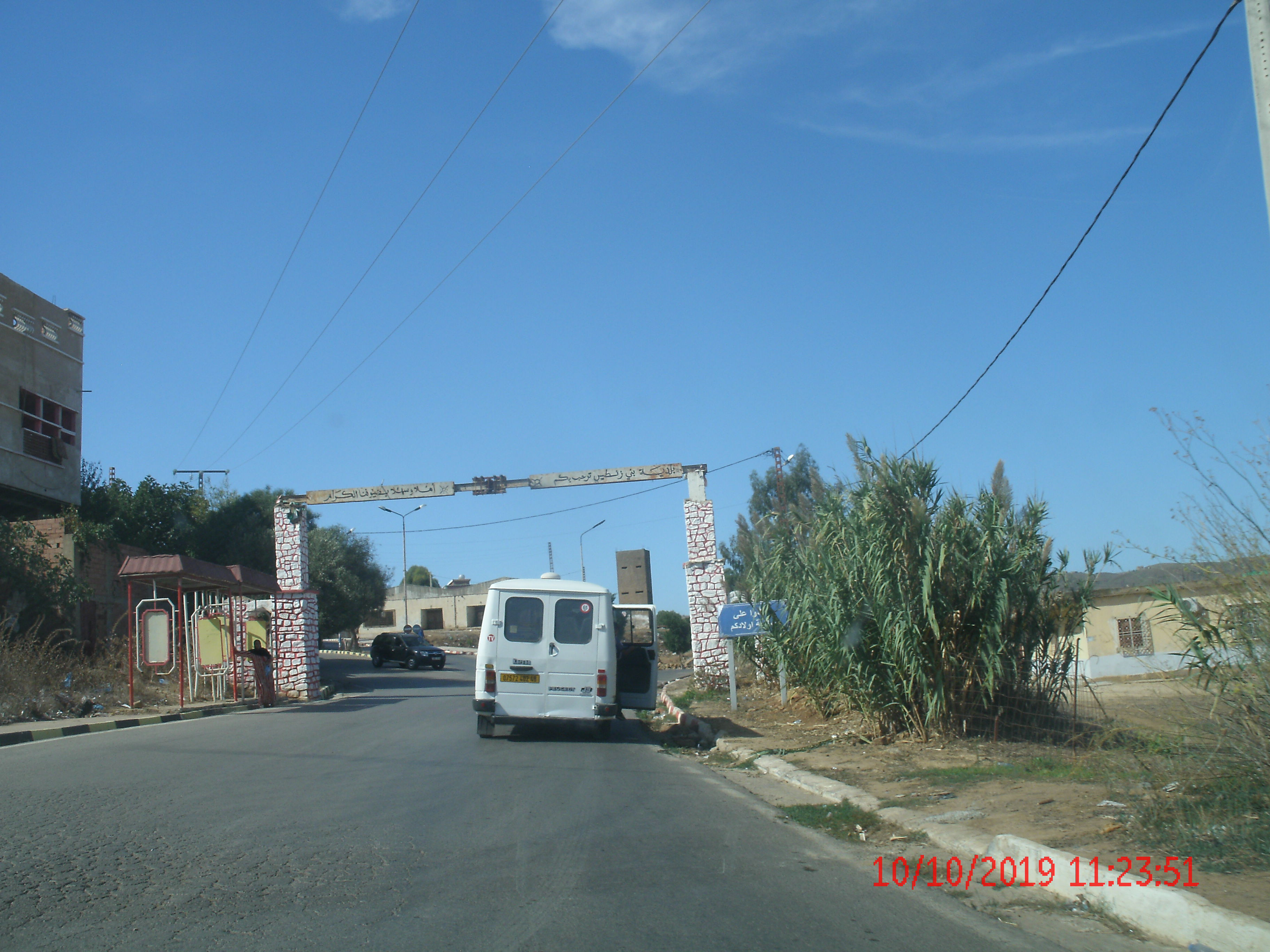
- Interactive map of Beni Zentis
- Country: Algeria
- Province: Relizane Province
- Time zone: UTC+1 (CET)

Beni Zentis is a town and commune in Relizane Province, Algeria.
