= El Guettar, Algeria =

El Guettar
- Commune and town

- Location within Algeria
- Coordinates: 36°5′16″N 0°48′57″E
- Country: Algeria
- Province: Relizane Province
- Time zone: UTC+1 (CET)

El Guettar is a town and commune in Relizane Province, Algeria.
