= Zemmoura =

Zemmoura زمورة
- Commune and town
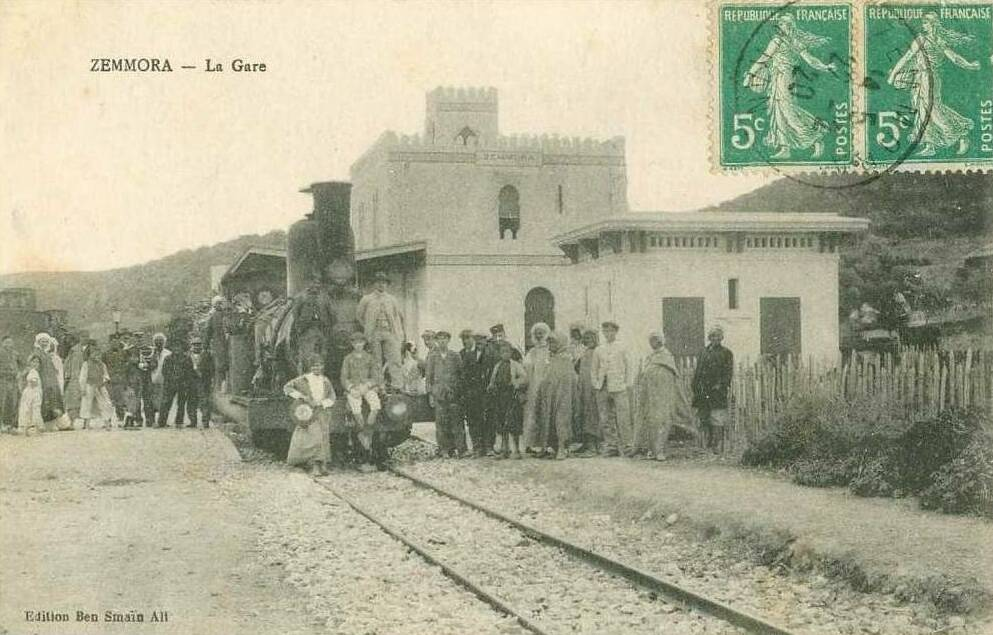

- Location within Algeria
- Coordinates: 35°43′N 0°45′E
- Country: Algeria
- Province: Relizane Province
- District: Zemmoura District

Area
  - Total: 94.08 sq mi (243.67 km^{2})

Population (2008)
  - Total: 30,027
- Time zone: UTC+1 (CET)
- Postal Code: 48155

Zemmoura is a town and commune in Relizane Province, Algeria.
