= El Matmar =

Coordinates: 35°44′N 0°28′E

- Commune and town
- Country: Algeria
- Province: Relizane Province
- Time zone: UTC+1 (CET)

El Matmar is a town and commune in Relizane Province, Algeria.
