= El Ouldja, Relizane =

Coordinates: 35°54′39″N 1°07′15″E

El Ouldja
- Commune and town
- Country: Algeria
- Province: Relizane Province
- Time zone: UTC+1 (CET)

El Ouldja is a town and commune in Relizane Province, Algeria.
