= Sidi M'hamed Benali =

Coordinates: 36°08′41″N 0°50′35″E

- Commune and town
- Interactive map of Sidi M'hamed Benali
- Country: Algeria
- Province: Relizane Province
- Time zone: UTC+1 (CET)

Sidi M'hamed Benali is a town and commune in Relizane Province, Algeria.
