= Sidi Lazreg =

Coordinates: 35°39′N 0°47′E

- Commune and town
- Interactive map of Sidi Lazreg
- Country: Algeria
- Province: Relizane Province
- Time zone: UTC+1 (CET)

Sidi Lazreg is a town and commune in Relizane Province, Algeria.
