= Mediouna, Algeria =

Coordinates: 36°07′25″N 0°44′50″E

Mediouna
- Commune and town
- Country: Algeria
- Province: Relizane Province
- Time zone: UTC+1 (CET)

Mediouna is a town and commune in Relizane Province, Algeria. famous men: Hayoute houcine
