= Sidi M'hamed Benaouda =

- Commune and town

- Location within Algeria
- Coordinates: 35.60409°N 0.58874°E
- Country: Algeria
- Province: Relizane Province
- Time zone: UTC+1 (CET)

Sidi M'hamed Benaouda is a town and commune in Relizane Province, Algeria.
