= Ammi Moussa =

Ammi Moussa عمي موسى
- Commune and town
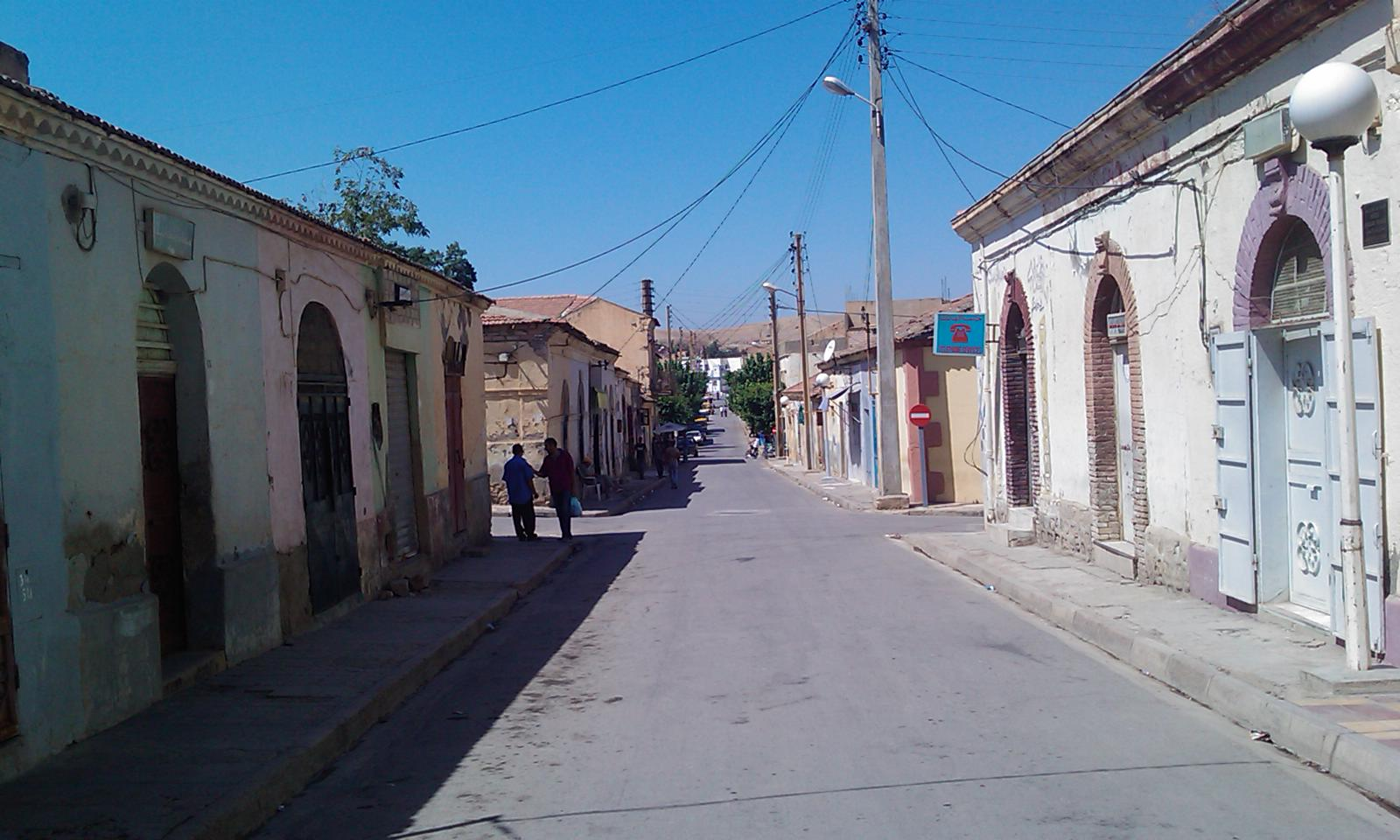

- Location within Algeria
- Coordinates: 35°52′N 1°7′E
- Country: Algeria
- Province: Relizane Province
- District: Ammi Moussa

Population (2008)
  - Total: 28,962
- Time zone: UTC+1 (CET)

Ammi Moussa (Arabic: عمي موسى) is a town and commune in Relizane Province, Algeria.
