= El Hassi, Relizane =

Coordinates: 35°44′N 1°01′E

El Hassi
- Commune and town
- Country: Algeria
- Province: Relizane Province
- Time zone: UTC+1 (CET)

El Hassi is a town and commune in Relizane Province, Algeria.
