= Oued Rhiou =

Coordinates: 35°58′N 0°55′E

Oued Rhiou Arabic وادي رهيو
- Commune and town
- Flag Coat of arms
- Interactive map of Oued Rhiou
- Country: Algeria
- Province: Relizane Province

Population (2008)
  - Total: 64 685
- Time zone: UTC+1 (CET)

Oued Rhiou is a town and commune in Relizane Province, Algeria.
