= Kalaa =

Coordinates: 35°34′50″N 0°19′42″E

- Commune and town
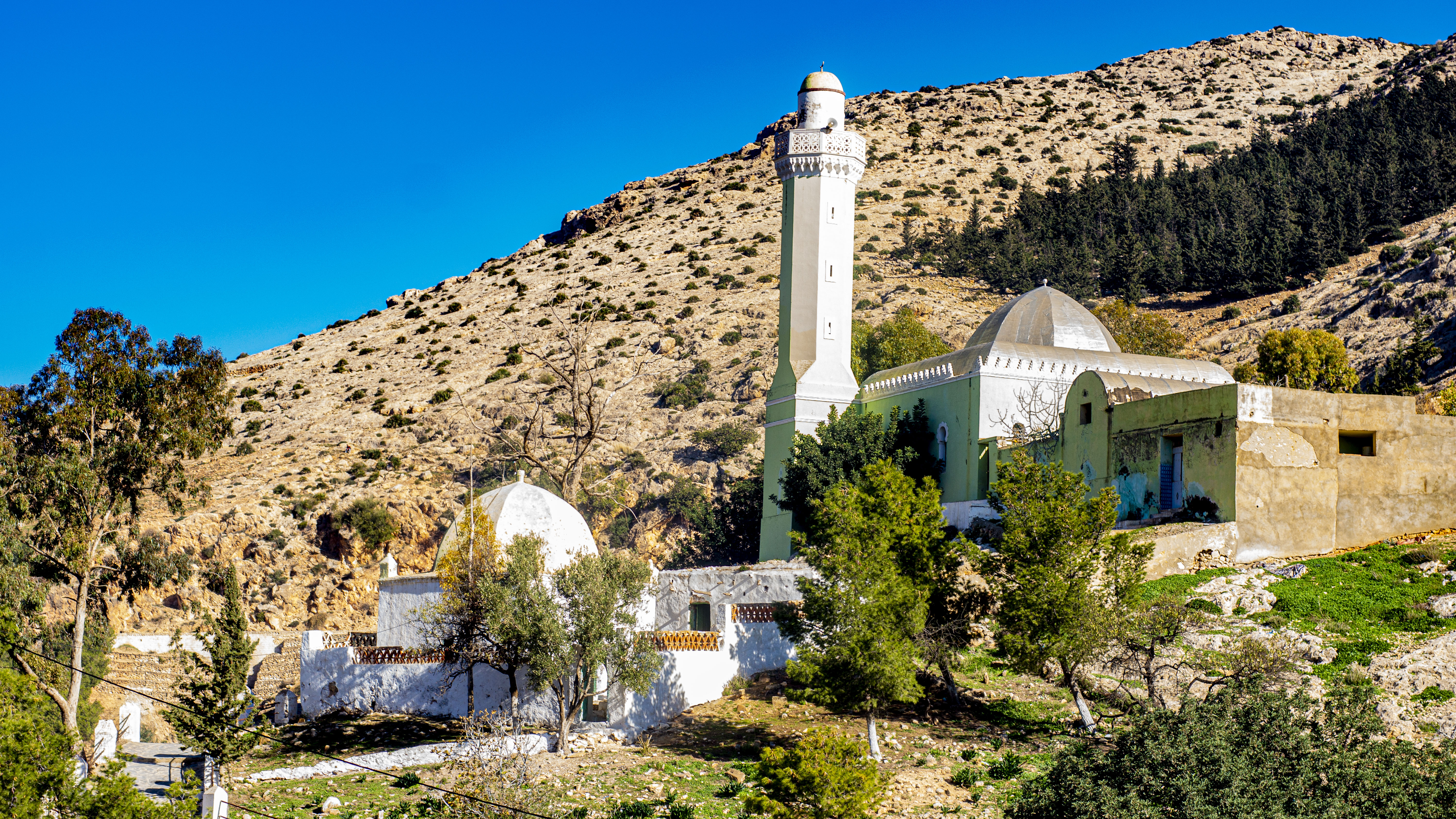

- Country: Algeria
- Province: Relizane Province
- Time zone: UTC+1 (CET)

Kalaa is a town and commune in Relizane Province, Algeria.

Al Qalaa or Qalaat Bani Rachid is one of the municipalities of the Algerian state of Glizan. It is located 32 km west of the state of Glizan. Its population was 11,659 according to the 2008 census.

== The names ==
The name of the castle has undergone many changes, as it has had a different name in each period. The most prominent names are:

Tasqadtal: Al-Bakri: “And three miles west of Mostaganem is the city of Mazagran, and near it is the castle of Hawara, which they call Tasqadtal. It is in a mountain with fruits and farms, and under this castle flows the Sirat River.”

Ibn Hawqal: “From the city of Fakkan to the camp, a large village with rivers, trees and fruits, a stage. From the camp to Tujan to Ain al-Safasif, a large village with a spring, rivers and fruits.”

Hawara Castle: The castle was named after the Hawara tribe and its leader, Ishaq al-Hawari, who built it in 1153 AD. Their rule continued for about two centuries until they were succeeded by the Banu Rashid. Al-Hassan al-Wazzan mentioned it in his famous book, Description of Africa: “The first is called the village of Hawara, and it includes forty houses of craftsmen and merchants. It was built in the form of a fortress on the slope of a mountain between two valleys.”

Bani Rashid Castle: The name has remained in use to this day, in reference to the Bani Rashid tribe.

== History ==
The Middle Ages.

In the late second century AH and the beginning of the third century AH, a war broke out between the Hawara tribe and the second Rustami Imam Abd al-Wahhab, and ended with the defeat of the Hawara and their expulsion outside of Tiaret. Ibn al-Saghir, the author of the novel, did not give us any details about the place where they established their new kingdom, merely referring to Mount Yinjan. If it were not for the text of al-Yaqubi, who completed Ibn al-Saghir's information, we would not have been able to determine the location of this kingdom, which he visited in the last quarter of the third century AH. He mentioned the name of its prince Ibn Masala and the cities affiliated with him, namely Yllel and al-Qalaa, which suggests that the castle was founded before al-Yaqubi's visit, i.e. before 284 AH. It has remained present since that date in geographical and historical sources, and has been known by different names such as the city of the mountain, Ain al-Safasif, Tasqadalt, Qalaat Hawara, and finally Qalaat Bani Rashid. Today, it is one of the municipalities in the southwest of the state of Ghlizan on the border with the state of Mascara, and bears the name of al-Qalaa.

Ottoman era

This town, which dates back to the Ottoman era, witnessed a cultural and urban prosperity, as its distinctive buildings still stand, resisting and awaiting restoration. The founding of this town, also called "Al-Hawara", dates back to the sixteenth century, according to some historical sources that mentioned that "Qalaat Bani Rashid" was named after Rashid bin Muhammad, who belonged to the Maghrawa tribe, and that the Ottomans used it as a fortress. Among the most important monuments of this city, which is distinguished by its narrow streets, is the old mosque, which was built in 1734 by Bey Bouchelaghem, as well as the Ottoman cemetery. The castle is also famous for having produced many religious scholars. The castle was an important political station for the Turks. The Battle of Soukh in the old neighborhood took place near the mosque on 27 Ramadan 1518 AD against the Spanish invaders and their allies, in which many martyrs fell, including Ishaq, the brother of Khair ad-Din Barbarossa, who was buried in Sidi Dahman, the mosque’s muezzin, Ben Said, Boumaza al-Sabbagh, Abu al-Alameh, the historian and judge Muhammad al-Sabbagh, Misbah, and Iskandar bin al-Saeed, the brother of Ishaq. During this important historical period, the city was subjected to a Spanish siege for six months, and the region held out due to the solidarity of the tribes neighboring the castle and their support for it, such as the tribes of Bani Shaqran, Fleeta, and Majhar. It is mentioned that during the Battle of Soukh, the besiegers set fire to the plant, which produced thick smoke, so that day became night, which caused the Spanish to retreat. According to the same speaker, the carpet unit in the castle, which has been inactive since the 1980s, will be transformed into a traditional industry center that includes all the crafts of the region, such as pottery, weaving, palm fronds, and leather, in addition to programming training for the region's craftswomen at the House of Crafts and Traditional Industries of Glizan. It is worth noting that the carpet of the castle of Beni Rachid is distinguished by specifications that make it unique from other carpets, as it is a type of velvet fabric (with knots) and is inspired by Andalusian-Maghreb art and is a purely women's industry. In the past, it gained great fame outside the country for several centuries, as it was in demand by wealthy families as a precious and rare commodity, according to historical sources.

== Industry ==
It is mentioned that the carpet of the Beni Rashid Castle dates back to the sixteenth century according to some historical sources. Some Ottoman accounts mention that this carpet is a reproduction of Asian and Eastern carpets, while other sources consider it to be original and has been present since the founding of the Beni Rashid Castle 9 centuries ago. As for Mr. Boualem Maaza, who established a modest museum in the castle, collecting everything precious and rare and preserving the manufacture of the carpet of the castle through his family, he believes that the history of this carpet dates back to the fall of Granada in Andalusia in 1492 and the arrival of craftsmen to the castle area. The carpet of the Beni Rashid Castle is distinguished by being a type of velvet fabric (with a knot) and is inspired by Andalusian-Maghreb art. It is a purely feminine industry, and it has gained great fame for several centuries, as it was in demand by the wealthy class as a precious and rare commodity according to historical sources.

== Religion ==
The physical remains also indicate the presence of an ancient Jewish cemetery in the castle known as “Al-Bayada”, and this was before the Jews emigrated from the city due to economic and political conditions. It is still just ruins that are not visible to the observer... Bani Rashid Castle. Many landmarks were destroyed and destroyed under the sight and eyes of those in charge, whether those that refer to prehistoric times or those that date back to the Ottoman period and beyond. No party has hesitated to this day to save what can be saved, whether the cultural collective movements at the level of the state that have become just a name, the official bodies, and the researcher, all in the orbit of silence.
