= Relizane Province =

Province of Algeria

Relizane Province ولاية غليزان
- Province
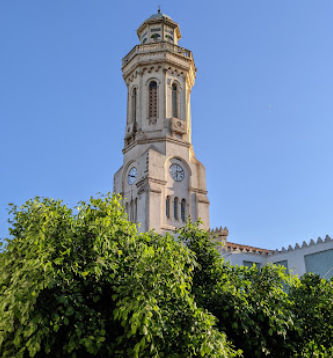

- Map of Algeria highlighting Relizane
- Coordinates: 35°44′N 0°33′E
- Country: Algeria
- Capital: Relizane

Government
  - PPA president: Mr. Benaouda Bettayeb (RND)
  - Wāli: Mr. Boukarabila Djelloul

Area
  - Total: 4,870 km^{2} (1,880 sq mi)

Population (2008)
  - Total: 733,060
  - Density: 151/km^{2} (390/sq mi)
- Time zone: UTC+01 (CET)
- Area Code: +213 (0) 46
- ISO 3166 code: DZ-48
- Districts: 13
- Municipalities: 38

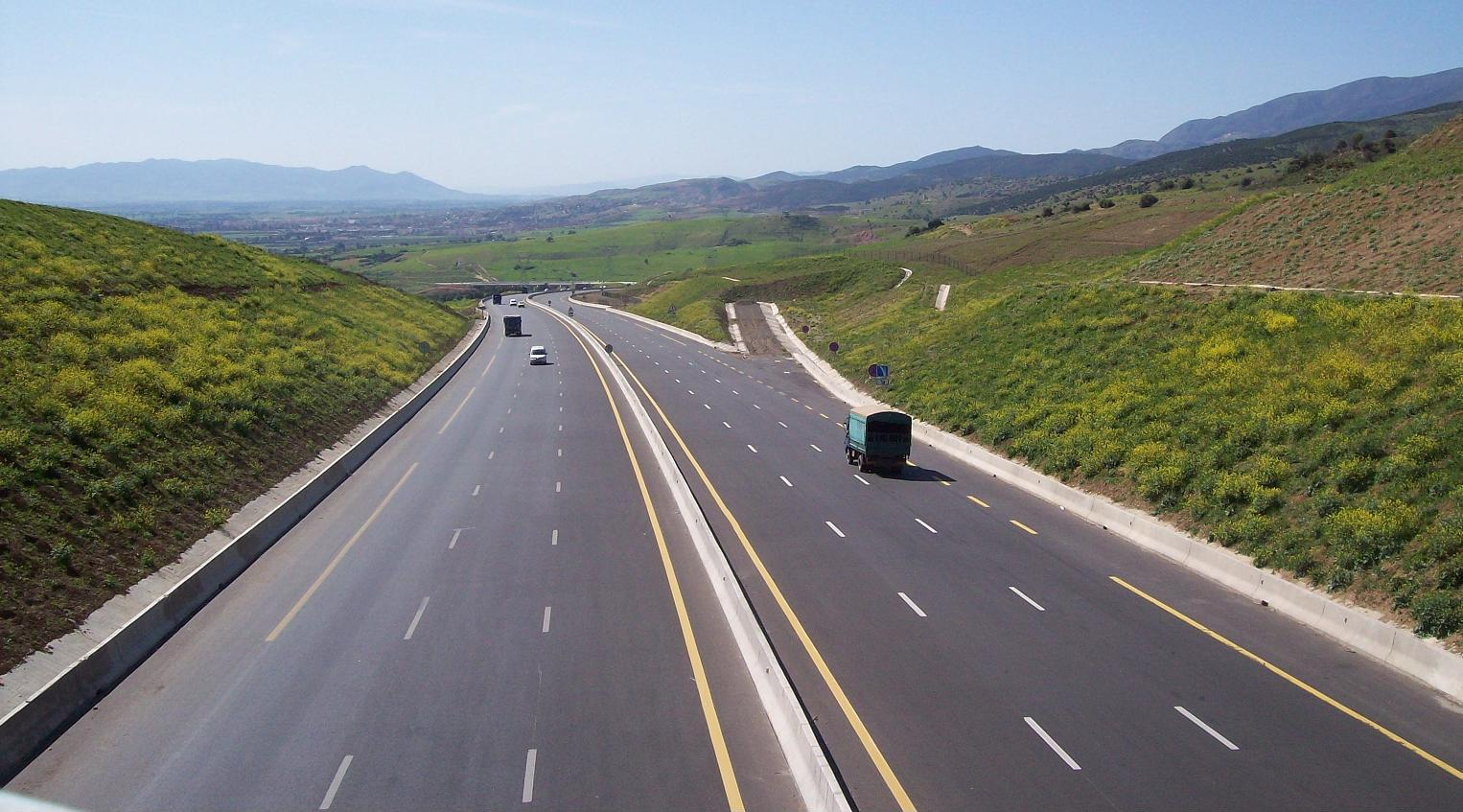
Autoroute Est-Ouest, near Ghomri, Relizane Province, Algeria

Relizane (Arabic: ولاية غليزان) is a province (wilaya) of Algeria. Relizane is the capital.

== History ==
The province was created from Mostaganem Province in 1984.

The Wilaya of Relizane massacres of 30 December 1997 and 4 January 1998 happened in Relizane, during the Algerian Civil War.

== Administrative divisions ==
The province is divided into 13 districts (daïras), which are further divided into 38 communes or municipalities.

Other localities include Bendaoud, Bouzegza, Hamri, Kalaa, Mazouna, and Zemmoura.

=== Districts (daïras) ===
1. Ain Tarik
2. Ammi Moussa
3. Djidiouia
4. El H'Madna
5. El Matmar
6. Mazouna
7. Mendes
8. Oued Rhiou
9. Ramka
10. Relizane
11. Sidi M'Hamed Ben Ali
12. Yellel
13. Zemmoura

=== Communes ===
1. Aïn Rahma
2. Ain Tarik
3. Ammi Moussa
4. Belassel Bouzegza
5. Bendaoud
6. Beni Dergoun
7. Beni Zentis
8. Dar Ben Abdellah
9. Djidioua
10. El Guettar
11. El H'Madna
12. El Hamri
13. El Hassi
14. El Matmar
15. El Ouldja
16. Had Echkalla
17. Kalaa
18. Lahlef
19. Mazouna
20. Mediouna
21. Mendes
22. Merdja Sidi Abed
23. Ouarizane
24. Oued Essalem
25. Oued Rhiou
26. Ouled Aiche
27. Ouled El Djemaa
28. Ouled Sidi Mihoub
29. Ramka
30. Relizane
31. Sidi Khettab
32. Sidi Lazreg
33. Sidi M'Hamed Ben Ali
34. Sidi M'Hamed Benaouda
35. Sidi Saada
36. Souk El Had
37. Yellel
38. Zemmoura
