= Djidioua =

Coordinates: 35°56′N 0°50′E

Jdiouia جديوية
- Commune and town
- Country: Algeria
- Province: Relizane Province
- Time zone: UTC+1 (CET)
- Postal code: 4814

Djediouia or جديوية is a town and commune located at 35°5'46 " north, 0°49'50" east in Relizane Province, Algeria and the presumed site of Ancient city and bishopric Catabum Castra, now a Latin Catholic titular see.. by 2008 this had risen to 33,835 and a population density of 254 inhabitants/km^{2}.

== History ==
The Roman town Catabum Castra was important enough in the Roman province of Mauretania Caesariensis to become a suffragan bishopric of its capital Caesarea in Mauretania's Metropolitan Archbishop. Under the French it was known as Saint Aimé.

== Source and External links ==
- GigaCatholic with titular incumbent biography links
