= Yellel =

- Commune and town
- Location within Algeria
- Coordinates: 35°43′0″N 0°21′0″E
- Country: Algeria
- Province: Relizane Province
- Time zone: UTC+1 (CET)

Yellel is a town and commune in Relizane Province, Algeria.
