= Relizane =

Relizane غليزان ⵖⵉⵍⵉⵣⴰⵏ
- City
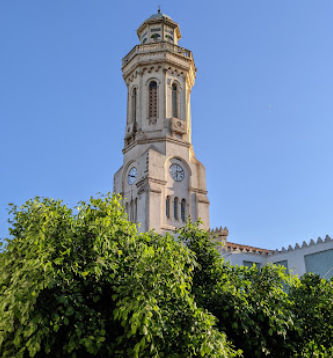
- Al Nour Mosque

- Location of Relizane in the Relizane Province

- Location of Relizane in the Algeria
- Coordinates: 35°44′N 0°33′E
- Country: Algeria
- Province: Relizane Province
- District: Relizane District
- APC: 2012-2017

Government
  - Type: Municipality
  - Mayor: Ouagouag Medjaded (FLN)

Area
  - Total: 110.82 km^{2} (42.79 sq mi)
- Elevation: 98 m (322 ft)

Population (2008)
  - Total: 123,255
  - Density: 1,112.2/km^{2} (2,880.6/sq mi)
- Time zone: UTC+1 (CET)
- Postal code: 48000
- ISO 3166 code: CP

Relizane or Ghilizan (Tamazight: ⵖⵉⵍⵉⵣⴰⵏ, romanized: Ɣilizan, Arabic: غلیزان, romanized: Ghilīzān) is a city in Algeria. It is the capital city of Relizane Province.In 2008, its population was 130,094, of which 109,689 resided in the city of Relizane itself.

Relizane is the successor to the historic city of Mina, which witnessed the passage of numerous civilizations and powers, notably the Numidians, Romans, and Vandals, and which reached its peak in the 2nd and 3rd centuries AD.

Relizane's geographical location is of great strategic importance: it lies at the crossroads of several local and national roads, including the current National Routes 4, 23, and 7, as well as the railway network connecting central and western Algeria.

Thanks to its location on the banks of the Mina Valley and in the Mina Plain, Relizane boasts numerous olive groves and citrus orchards destined for the food processing industry.

== Toponymy ==
The name of Relizane comes from the Berber ⵉⵖⵉⵍ ⵉⵣⵣⴰⵏ (Iɣil Izzan) which means "burnt / grilled hill". The Turks built a bordj there, hence the name Bordj Ighil Izan, to control the road to Oran. The population is mainly from the Flittas and Beni-Ouragh of Ouarsenis.

== Geography ==
=== Topography ===
The topography within 2 miles of Relizane is only modest variations in elevation, with a maximum elevation change of 210 feet and an average elevation above sea level of 230 feet. Within 16 kilometers, slight variations in altitude only (533 meters). Within 80 kilometers, very significant variations in altitude (1,268 meters).

The region within a 3 kilometer radius of Relizane is covered by cultivated land (47%), artificial surfaces (31%) and sparse vegetation (11%), within a 16 kilometer radius by cultivated land (53%) and sparse vegetation (31%) and within a radius of 80 kilometers by cultivated land (47%) and sparse vegetation (17%).

=== Climate ===
Relizane is classified as having a Mediterranean climate. The summers are short, sweltering, arid, and mostly clear and the winters are long, cool, windy, and partly cloudy. During the year, the temperature generally ranges from 7 °C to 38 °C and is rarely below 3 °C or above 42 °C.

== History ==
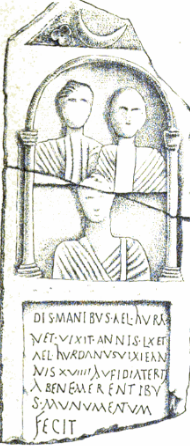
Epitaph found in the ruins of Mina

=== Antiquity ===
==== Roman ====
The city of Mina is among the most famous cities of Mauretania Caesariensis , whose capital was Cherchell. In 40 AD, the Roman Empire occupied the province after the assassination of Ptolemy by Emperor Caligula. Mina became a military center within the defensive limes line, which kept a close watch on local revolutionaries. According to antiquities discovered in the area, the city enjoyed great economic prosperity between the 2nd and 3rd centuries AD.

==== Vandals ====
In the year 430 AD, the Vandals occupied North Africa and destroyed many cities. At that time, the city of Mina represented the region in the Carthage Ecclesiastical Council for 484 and 525 AD.

=== Medieval Islamic period ===
==== Zianid Period ====
This period of the Zianid kingdom saw the emergence of the name Ighil Izan, when Sultan Abu Hammou Moussa II established a military camp in one of the hills to fight his cousin Bouzian Al-Koubi.

==== Ottoman Period ====
After the final fall of the Zianid kingdom to the Ottomans in 1556, they created three provinces called Beyliks, and the Relizane region belonged to the Western Beylik. However, there are no historical sources that adequately address the region, with the exception of the remains of a dam dating from the Ottoman era which the inhabitants used to irrigate their lands, as well as the passage of the Royal Road linking Algiers to Oran.

=== French colonization ===
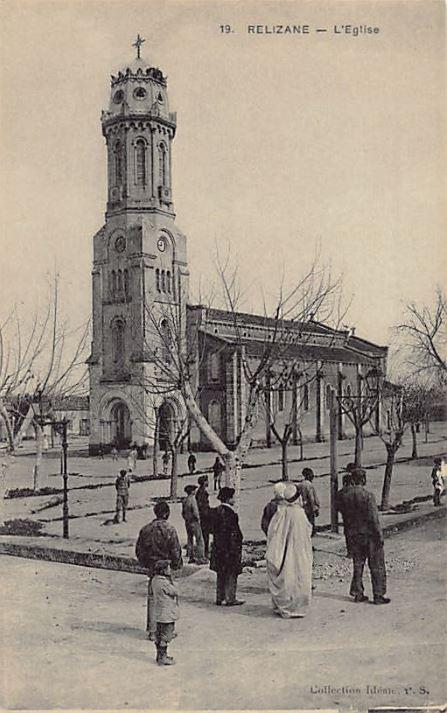
Church of St Joseph

In the nineteenth century, agriculture was very often threatened by frequent droughts. It was not until 1852 that French troops occupied Relizane, and a colonial settlement centre was created by imperial decree on 27 February 1857 and that was elevated to the rank of a full-service commune on 5 February 1871.

In 1844, the French engineers repaired the old dam; the old hydraulic works were partially restored in the 18th century). In 1853, the first Europeans settled in the plain and cultivated small areas of wheat and barley plus a few areas of tobacco that were quickly abandoned since malaria killed so many people although the creation of Relizane was not decided until January 1857. Since then, certain houses built after the Algiers-Oran railway have given it a new face. In the meantime, the European population was increasing.

The French come from the country's south (Gard) and the Spaniards from Valencia, Alicante, Murcia and Almería. About 20 farms cultivated cotton. The city then experienced a prodigious development, but disease, drought and insufficient harvests slowed down any progress. Also the natural disaster that preceded the imperial voyage was the main reason for the incident on 6 May 1865. In the south of Oran the revolt of the Ouled Sidi Cheikh broke out because of the discontent of the population since 1860. The disillusion and the unkept promises by the French were at the origin of one of the biggest insurrections, which lasted until 1896.

A labor camp is used to imprison Spanish Republican refugees at the end of the Spanish Civil War (La Retirada).

The population of Relizane took part in the national liberation struggle and made the city part of the contemporary history of Algeria against French colonization.

=== Refugees from the Spanish Civil War (1939) ===
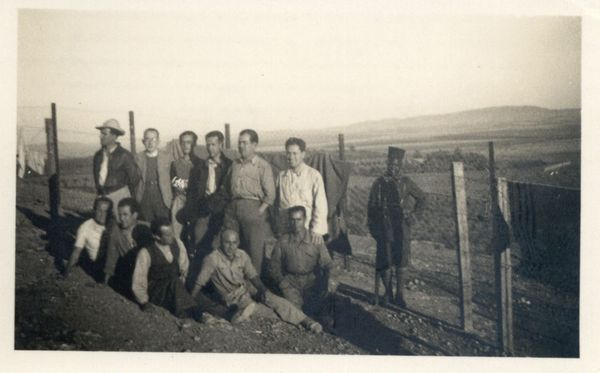
Relizane camp

The Spanish Civil War had numerous political and social consequences. In 1939, many Spanish Republicans fled to North Africa on the British ship Stanbrook, captained by Archibald Dickson, who decided to rescue Republican families trapped in the port of Alicante by the Nationalists. They arrived in the city of Oran on 18 March. The French authorities built several camps for the refugees, and the Relizane camp was among the most comfortable for them in Algeria.

== Demographics ==
Historical population

Year	Pop.	±%
1975	48,094	—
1985	83,864	+74.4%
1990	96,109	+14.6%

Year	Pop.	±%
1998	111,186	+15.7%
2015	147,720	+32.9%

== Transportation ==
=== Rail transport ===
- Lines no longer in service:
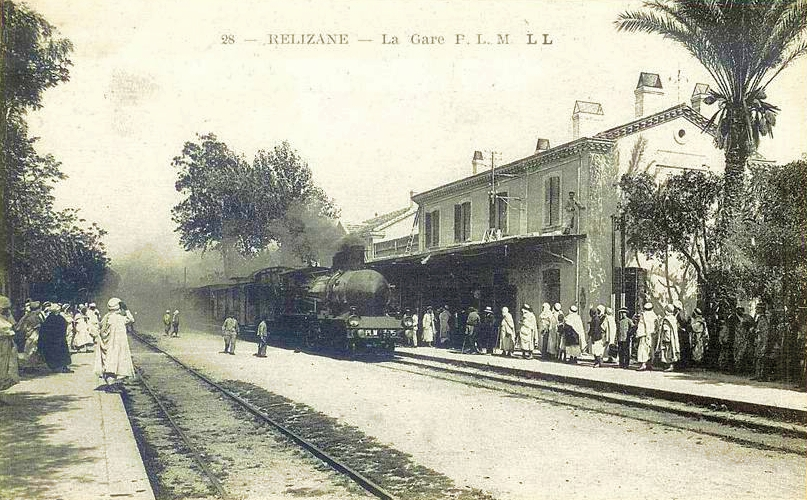
  Relizane train station at the beginning of the 20th century
1. The line connecting La Macta to Trumelet, created in 1888 via the Mechraa Safa and Oued El Abtal project, thus becoming one of the most important branches of the Algiers-Oran line.
2. The line connecting Mostaganem and Trumelet via Relizane and Zemmora. It was opened in June 1927. Service to the Oued El Abtal station was interrupted due to flooding of the Oued Mina.
- Line in service:

This is one of the best-known active lines connecting Algiers to Oran, as it entered service on 15 June 1870 and transports passengers and goods, notably grain.

After independence, the line linking Algiers and Oran remained in service, pending the rehabilitation of the Tiaret-Relizane line from Tissemsilt.

=== Air transport ===
In the 1930, the French established an airport where a local flying club operated. It was expanded by American forces during World War II. It was subsequently used for parachuting, aerobatics, and gliding training until Algeria's independence. Today, it is a small airport where helicopters land.

== Education ==
The University of Relizane was established in the city in 2002.

== Arts ==
=== Events and festivals ===
The city hosts numerous cultural events in various fields, most notably :

- Sidi M'hamed Benaouda Documentary Film Festival: The Sidi M'hamed Ben Aouda International Documentary Film Festival, founded in 2019 by the Al Zaitouna Cultural Association and supported by the Algerian Ministry of Culture and Arts, takes place annually in Relizane. This prestigious event aims to promote documentary cinema by showcasing films addressing global issues such as the Sustainable Development Goals. In addition to fostering dialogue among filmmakers from around the world, the festival also celebrates Algerian cultural heritage and its diversity.
- Mina Theatre Days: The local drama association Gouala, supported by the Algerian Ministry of Culture and Arts, regularly organizes this event, which comprises 12 sessions and is aimed at amateur theatre groups from various regions of the country.
- Exhibition of City Figures: The municipal office, Djanatu Al-Arif, organizes an annual exhibition of city figures to commemorate their memory and present them to future generations on the occasion of living in peace.
- Heritage Month: Cultural services and cultural associations organize the Tangible and Intangible Heritage Month event, which lasts a full month and includes lectures, scientific seminars, and tourist trips to showcase it to the public.
- Local Cultural Festival of Arts and Popular Cultures

=== National and local holidays ===
Families celebrate religious, national, and historical holidays with special attention. "The most celebrated holidays are Eid al-Fitr, or the women who provide various forms of assistance throughout Ramadan in order to receive invitations during the Eid days, in addition to buying clothes for the children." The second Eid is Eid al-Adha, the day of sacrifice and solidarity with the poor, and the preparation of many traditional dishes, such as Bouzlouf, Douara, and Chwaya. Ashura is the last two consecutive days of seeking forgiveness from God.

The Yennayer celebration, held on 11 and 12 January each year, is an occasion to prepare traditional dishes like Cherchem Sfendj, to buy fruit, and to collect the dates collected on the eve of Eid. They anticipate a year full of goodness and blessings.

== Sports ==
- RC Relizane
- Afak Relizane

== Relizane in the arts and culture ==
=== Cinéma ===
- Fire !
- Thirst of Men
- Documentary film by M'hamed Issiakhem
- Hassan Niya

=== Painting ===
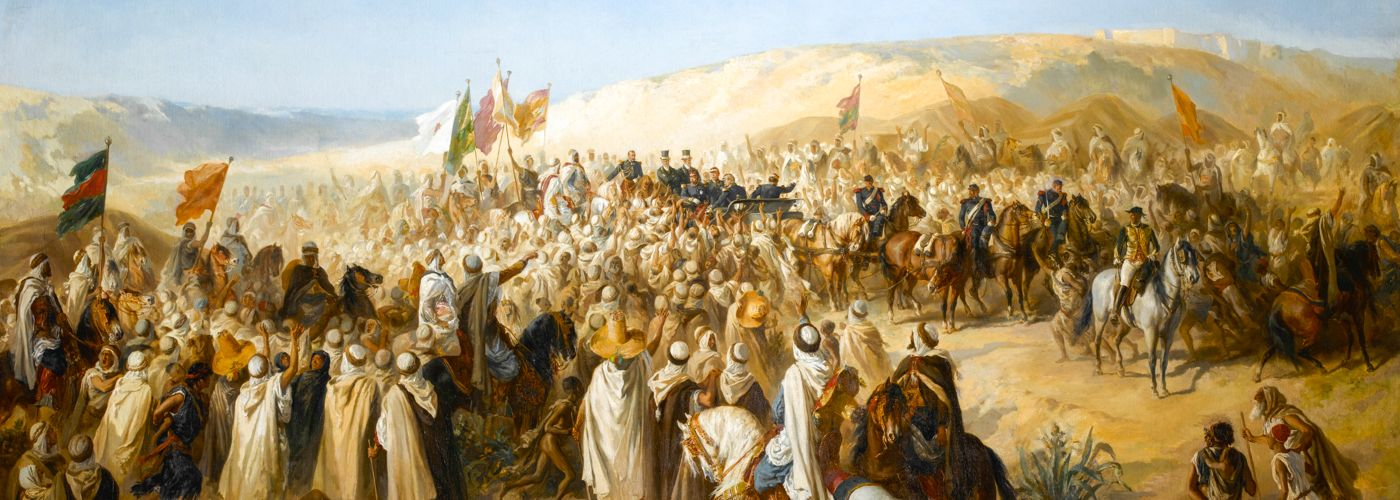
- L'Empereur Napoléon III à Relizane
  Among the most famous paintings depicting the town of Relizane is that of the artist Henri-Alfred Darjou, in which he portrays Napoleon III's visit to the town when he granted a pardon to the Flittas tribe on 21 May 1865. The painting, created in 1868, is on display at the National Museum of the Palaces of Versailles and Trianon.

=== Literature ===
Numerous novels have been published about the city of Relizane, recounting the daily lives of the novel's protagonists. Among the most prominent local novelists is Mohammed Meflah.

Olivia Alkaim has published a novel entitled "The Tailor of Relizane ", which tells of her grandfather's links with the Algerian nationalist movement, the French military authorities in the town and his regrets concerning the town of Relizane during his exile in France.

== Notable landmarks ==
The sites	Description	Category of the ranking	illustrated
The ancient bridge	Le pont Mina, qui est ce qui reste d'aqueduc, a une superficie de 16 m²	Classified	أطلال جسر روماني .....بالمدخل الغربي لمدينة غليزان
Mina archaeological site	Le site de Mina, qui est ce qui reste de la ville historique de Mina.Le site a une superficie de 17 ha. et se situe à 3 km de la ville	Classified	
Al Noor Mosque	Ce mémorial était autrefois une église et a été transformé en mosquée en 1989. C'est l'une des plus grandes mosquées de la wilaya .		Ville de Relizane
Al jamaa Al kabeer			جامع الكبير ذو طابع معماري عربي أندلسي

== Twin towns – sister cities ==
- Fès Morocco since 2012.

== Notable people linked to the city ==
- Ahmed Francis
- Dominique Cabrera
- Ali Boumendjel
- Colonel Amirouche
- M"hamed Issiakhem
- Hadj Belkhir

== See also ==
- Wilaya of Relizane massacres of 4 January 1998
- Wilaya of Relizane massacres of 30 December 1997
