= Battle of Bab El Bekkouche =

Coordinates: 35°44′57″N 1°32′52″E

- Part of Algerian War
Date	28–31 May 1958
Location	Ouarsenis, Lardjem Algeria N 35°44′57″ E 1°32′52″
Result	FLN victory

Belligerents
France	FLN

Commanders and leaders
	Si Ameur Mesbah

Strength
8,000 soldiers two aircraft	Unknown

Casualties and losses
Algerian claims: 600 killed (including 33 officers) two aircraft	Algerian claims: 360 killed 240 civilians, mostly elders, children and women, were killed

The Battle of Bab El Bekkouche during the Algerian War took place on 28 May 1958 in the region of Ouarsenis.

The French army had mobilized nearly 8,000 soldiers. Faced with this situation, the "katiba El karimia" of the Wilaya IV, commanded by Si Ameur Mesbah, had developed a plan to loosen the vise by targeting several military post colonies in Bordj Bounaama, Sidi Abed, Lardjem and Tamalaht, to disperse the French troops.

The French colonial army suffered heavy losses in this battle (600 deaths, including 33 officers and two aircraft destroyed). In the ranks of the National Liberation Army (NLA), 360 were killed. 240 civilians were also killed.

== See also ==
- French Algeria
