= Lardjem District =

Coordinates: 35.7495°N 1.5485°E

Lardjem District دائرة لرجام
- District

- Map of Algeria highlighting Tissemsilt Province
- Country: Algeria
- Province: Tissemsilt
- District seat: Lardjem

Population (1998)
  - Total: 38,890
- Time zone: UTC+01 (CET)
- District code: 38300
- Municipalities: 4

Lardjem is a district in Tissemsilt Province, Algeria. It was named after its capital, Lardjem.

== Municipalities ==
The district is further divided into 4 municipalities:

- Lardjem
- Tamalaht
- Melaab
- Sidi Lantri
