= Bordj Bou Naâma District =

Coordinates: 35.6078°N 1.8111°E

Bordj Bou Naâma District دائرة برج بو نعامة
- District
- Map of Algeria highlighting Tissemsilt Province
- Country: Algeria
- Province: Tissemsilt
- District seat: Bordj Bou Naâma

Population (1998)
  - Total: 33,560
- Time zone: UTC+01 (CET)
- Municipalities: 4

Bordj Bou Naâma is a district in Tissemsilt Province, Algeria. It was named after its capital, Bordj Bounaama.

== Municipalities ==
The district is further divided into 4 municipalities:

- Bordj Bounaama
- Sidi Slimane
- Beni Chaib
- Beni Lahcene
