= Lazharia District =

Coordinates: 35.9373°N 1.5600°E

Lazharia District دائرة الأزهرية
- District
- Map of Algeria highlighting Tissemsilt Province
- Country: Algeria
- Province: Tissemsilt
- District seat: Lazharia

Population (1998)
  - Total: 19,773
- Time zone: UTC+01 (CET)
- Municipalities: 3

Lazharia is a district in Tissemsilt Province, Algeria. It was named after its capital, Lazharia.

== Municipalities ==
The district is further divided into 3 municipalities:

- Lazharia
- Boucaid
- Larbaa
