= Ammari District =

Coordinates: 35.5771°N 1.6623°E

Ammari District دائرة عماري
- District
- Map of Algeria highlighting Tissemsilt Province
- Country: Algeria
- Province: Tissemsilt
- District seat: Ammari

Population (1998)
  - Total: 17,329
- Time zone: UTC+01 (CET)
- Municipalities: 3

Ammari is a district in Tissemsilt Province, Algeria. It was named after its capital, Ammari.

== Municipalities ==
The district is further divided into 3 municipalities:

- Ammari
- Sidi Abed
- Maacem
