= Théniet El Had District =

Coordinates: 35.8833°N 2.0000°E

Théniet El Had District دائرة ثنية الأحد
- District
- Map of Algeria highlighting Tissemsilt Province
- Country: Algeria
- Province: Tissemsilt
- District seat: Théniet El Had

Population (1998)
  - Total: 32,444
- Time zone: UTC+01 (CET)
- Municipalities: 2

Théniet El Had is a district in Tissemsilt Province, Algeria. It was named after its capital, Théniet El Had. Théniet El Had National Park is there.

== Municipalities ==
The district is further divided into 2 municipalities:

- Théniet El Had
- Sidi Boutouchent
