= Khémisti District =

Coordinates: 35.6667°N 1.9500°E

Khémisti District دائرة خميستي
- District
- Map of Algeria highlighting Tissemsilt Province
- Country: Algeria
- Province: Tissemsilt
- District seat: Khémisti (Tissemsilt Province)

Population (1998)
  - Total: 40,771
- Time zone: UTC+01 (CET)
- Municipalities: 2

Khémisti is a district in Tissemsilt Province, Algeria. It was named after its capital, Khémisti.

== Municipalities ==
The district is further divided into 2 municipalities:

- Khemisti
- Laayoune
