= Lazharia =

Lazharia Ain Lellou
- Commune and town
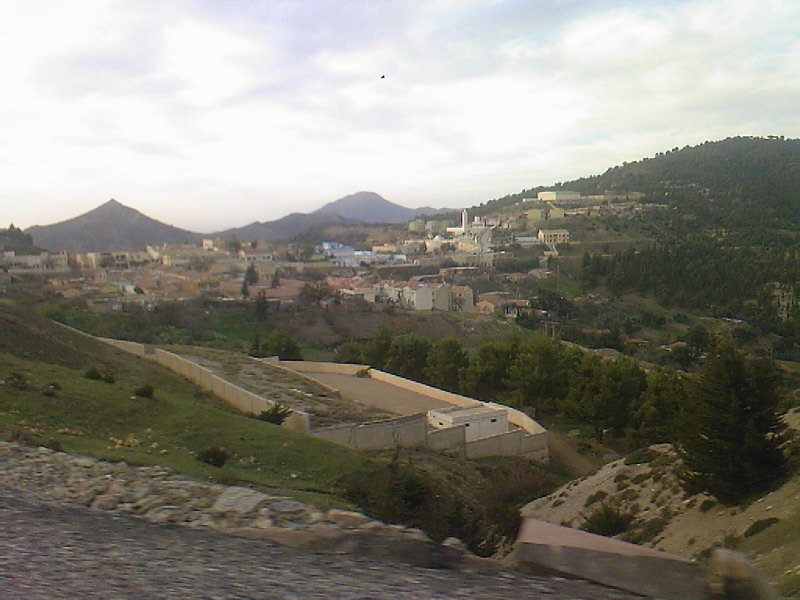
- lazharia, 2006

- Location within Algeria
- Coordinates: 35°36′14″N 1°33′35″E
- Country: Algeria
- Province: Tissemsilt Province

Population (2008)
  - Total: 8,071
- Time zone: UTC+1 (CET)

Lazharia is a town, commune and daïra in Tissemsilt Province in northern Algeria. It is located about 74 km west of Tissemsilt and at 45 km of Chlef.

The daïra of Lazharia consists of three communes: Lazharia, Boucaid and Larbaa

The city is located at about 1000m above sea level on the western flank of the Ouarsenis mountains. The city is populated mainly by berbere tribes: Beni Hendel and Beni Boukhanous.
