= Bordj Emir Abdelkader District =

Coordinates: 35.9157°N 2.2710°E

Bordj Emir Abdelkader District دائرة برج الأمير عبد القادر
- District
- Map of Algeria highlighting Tissemsilt Province
- Country: Algeria
- Province: Tissemsilt
- District seat: Bordj Emir Abdelkader

Population (1998)
  - Total: 10,993
- Time zone: UTC+01 (CET)
- Municipalities: 2

Bordj Emir Abdelkader is a district in Tissemsilt Province, Algeria. It was named after its capital, Bordj Emir Abdelkader.

== Municipalities ==
The district is further divided into 2 municipalities:

- Bordj Emir Abdelkader
- Youssoufia
