= Youssoufia =

Youssoufia may refer to:

- Youssoufia, Algeria
- Youssoufia, Morocco
