= Tissemsilt District =

Coordinates: 35.6072°N 1.8106°E

Tissemsilt District دائرة تسمسيلت
- District
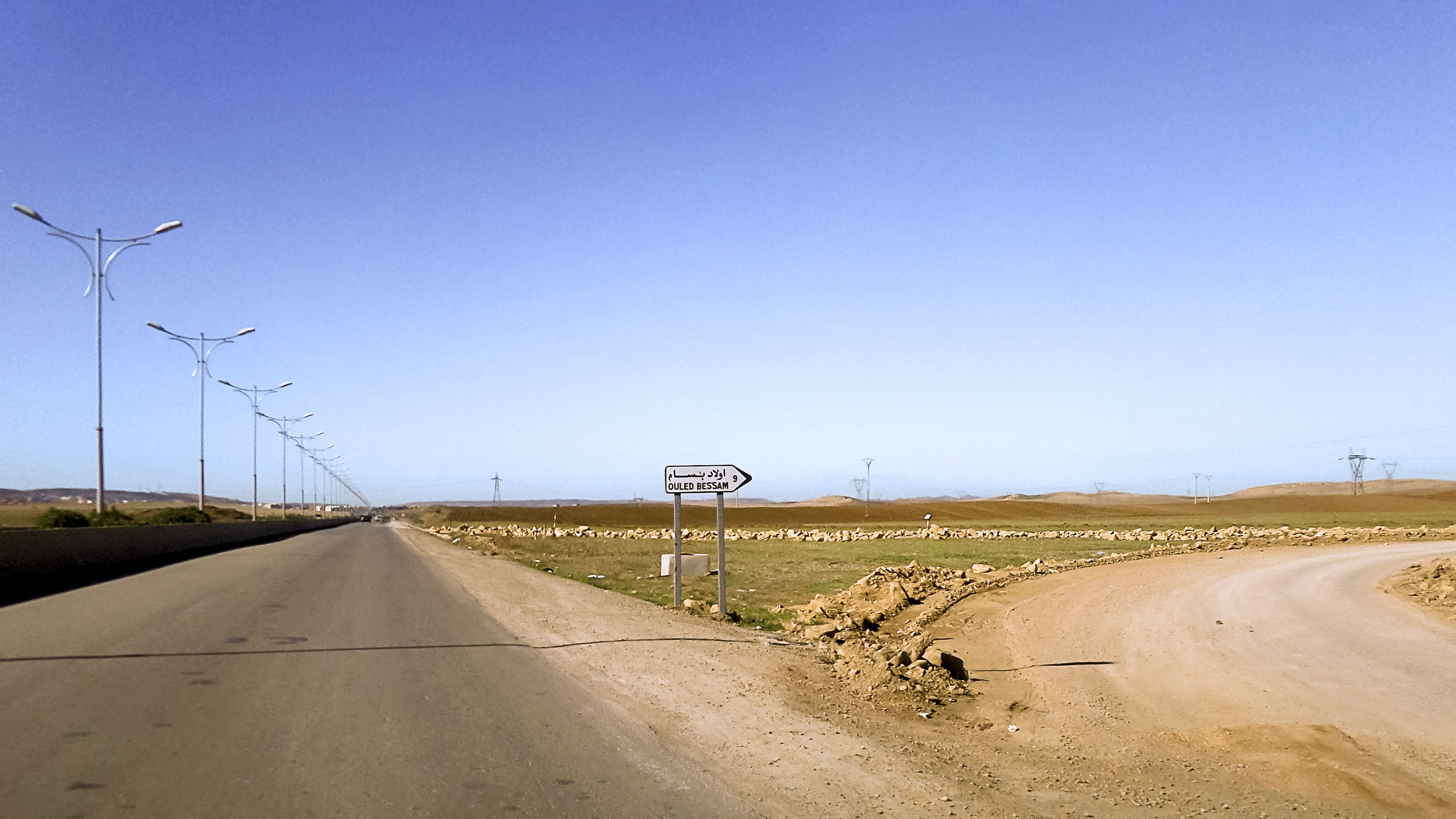
- Road junction between Khemisti, Tissemsilt and Ouled Bessem

- Map of Tissemsilt Province highlighting Tissemsilt District

- Map of Algeria highlighting Tissemsilt Province
- Country: Algeria
- Province: Tissemsilt
- District seat: Tissemsilt

Population (1998)
  - Total: 70,480
- Time zone: UTC+01 (CET)
- Municipalities: 2

Tissemsilt is a district in Tissemsilt Province, Algeria. It was named after its capital, Tissemsilt, which is also the capital of the province.

== Municipalities ==
The district is further divided into 2 municipalities:

- Tissemsilt
- Ouled Bessem
