= Tissemsilt Province =

Province of Algeria

Tissemsilt Province ولاية تسمسيلت
- Province
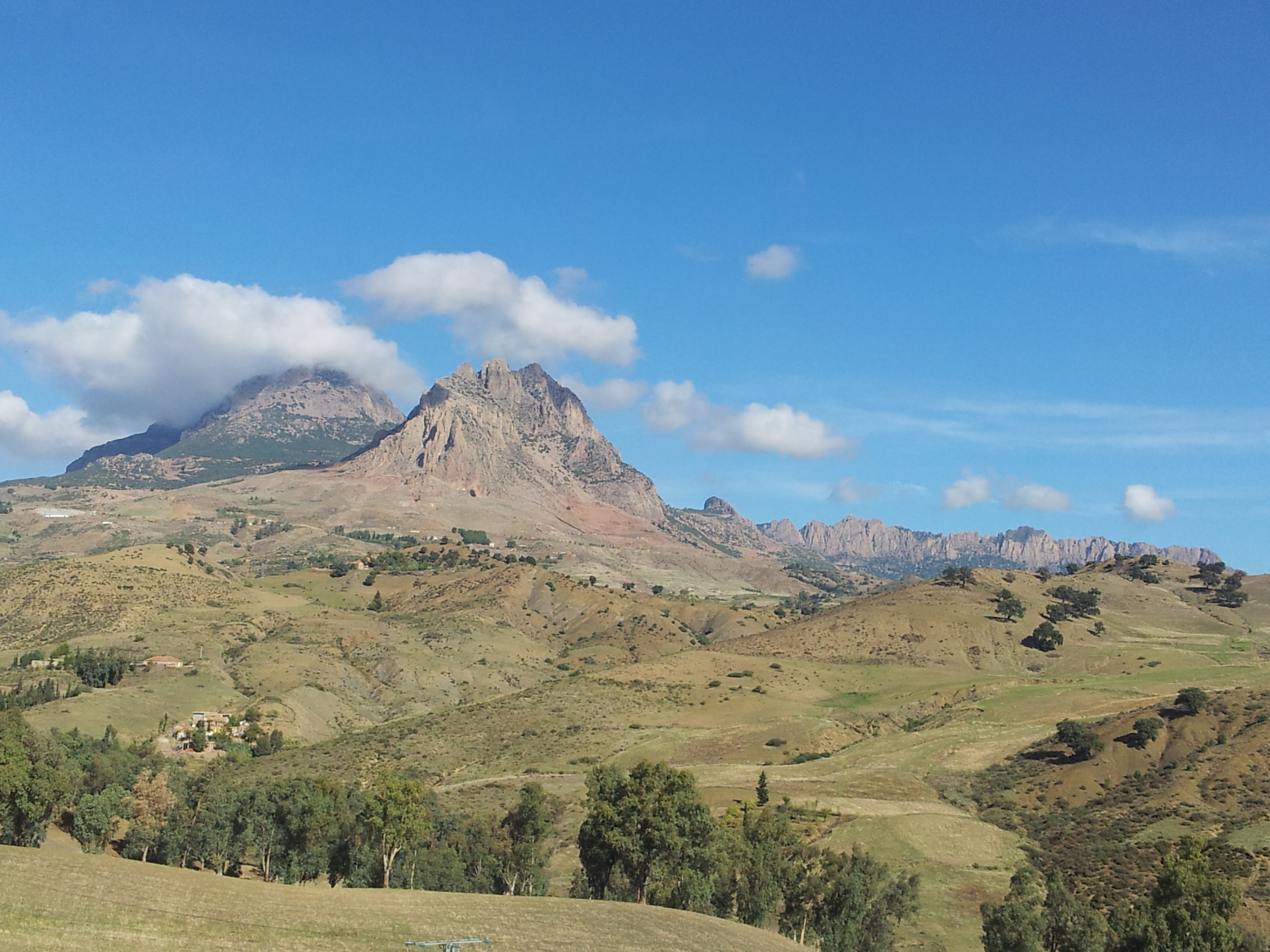

- Map of Algeria highlighting Tissemsilt
- Coordinates: 35°36′N 1°49′E
- Country: Algeria
- Capital: Tissemsilt

Area
  - Total: 3,152 km^{2} (1,217 sq mi)

Population (2008)
  - Total: 296,366
  - Density: 94.02/km^{2} (243.5/sq mi)
- Time zone: UTC+01 (CET)
- Area Code: +213 (0) 46
- ISO 3166 code: DZ-38
- Districts: 8
- Municipalities: 22

Tissemsilt (Arabic: ولاية تسمسيلت) is the 38th province of Algeria with the capital being Tissemsilt. Théniet El Haâd National Park is located there.

== History ==
The province was created from parts of Alger Province and Tiaret Province in 1984.

== Administrative divisions ==
The province is divided into 8 districts (daïras), which are further divided into 22 communes or municipalities.

=== Districts ===
Districts Of Tissemsilt Province

1. Ammari
2. Bordj Bou Naâma
3. Bordj Emir Abdelkader
4. Khémisti
5. Lardjem
6. Lazharia
7. Théniet El Had
8. Tissemsilt

=== Communes ===
Communes Of Tissemsilt Province

1. Ammari
2. Beni Chaib
3. Beni Lahcene
4. Bordj Bou Naama
5. Bordj El Emir Abdelkader
6. Boucaid
7. Khemisti
8. Laayoune (Layoune)
9. Larbaa
10. Lardjem
11. Lazharia
12. Maacem
13. Melaab
14. Ouled Bessem
15. Sidi Abed
16. Sidi Boutouchent
17. Sidi Lantri
18. Sidi Slimane
19. Tamalaht
20. Théniet El Had
21. Tissemsilt
22. Youssoufia (El Youssoufia)
