= Bordj Bounaama =

Bordj Bou Naama بلدية برج بونعامة
- Municipality
- Commune of Bordj Bou Naama
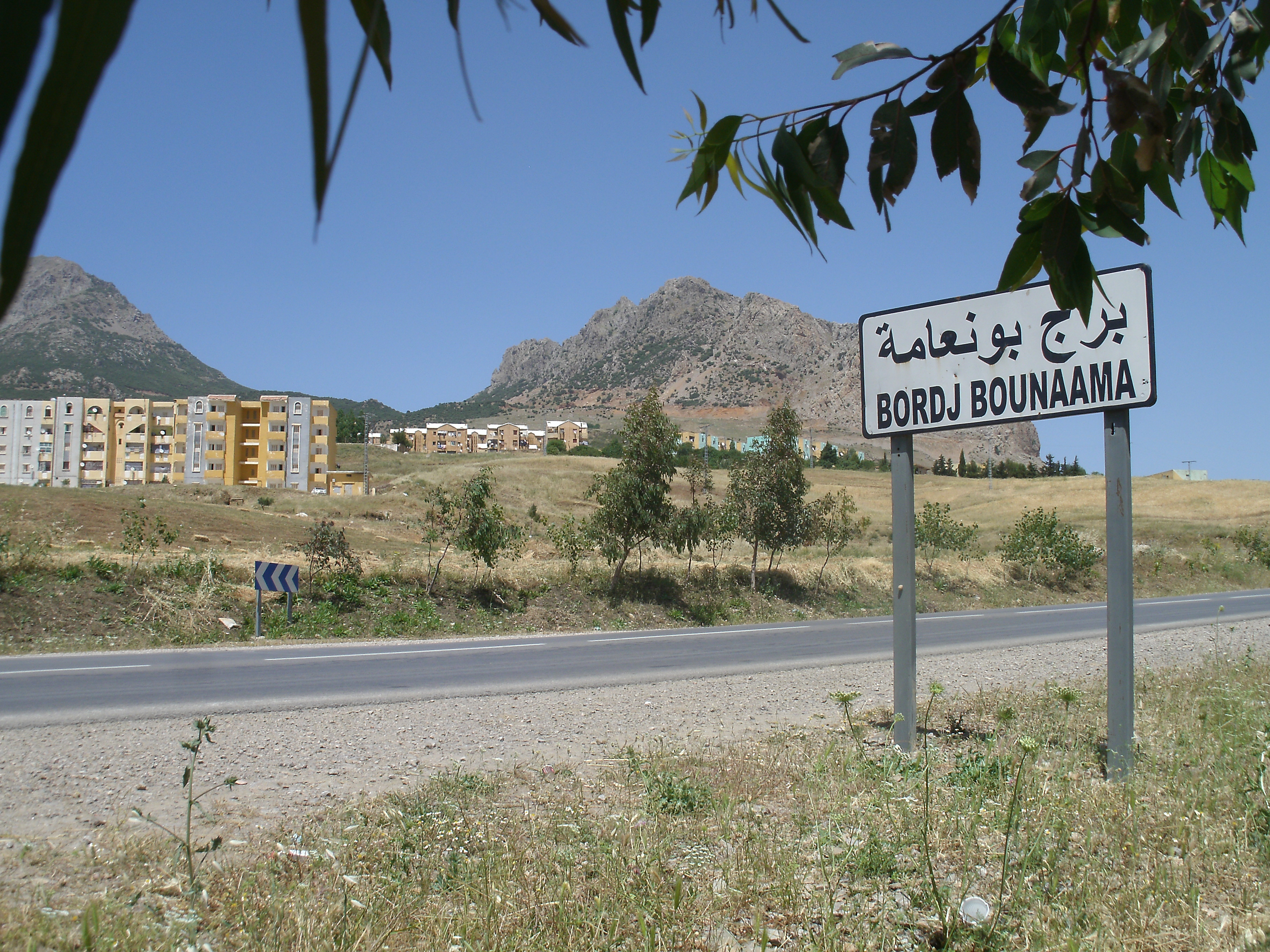

- Location of Bordj Bounaama within Algeria
- Coordinates: 35°51′00″N 1°37′00″E
- Country: Algeria
- Province: Tissemsilt
- District: Bordj Bounaama (seat)

Government
  - PMA Seats: 11

Area
  - Total: 63 km^{2} (24 sq mi)
- Elevation: 1,098 m (3,602 ft)

Population (2008)
  - Total: 20,864
  - Density: 330/km^{2} (860/sq mi)
- Time zone: UTC+1 (CET)
- Postal code: 38300
- ONS code: 3801

Bordj Bounaama is a small, mountainous town of about 25,000 inhabitants in the heart of the Ouarsenis mountains in northwestern Algeria. The city is a commune and a daïra of the wilaya of Tissemsilt. It was known as Molière during the French occupation of Algeria (1830–1962), and then as Beni Hendel until 1975. The city is elevated 1098 m above sea level and is attached to Sid Aamar (le Grand Pic) of the Ouarsenis mountains, which rises to 1985 m.

After independence from France, the city held the name Beni Hendel, which was a Berber tribe living in the area several centuries ago. After 1975 the city took its current name, Bordj Bounaama, in memorial to the martyr Si M'hamed Bounaama (also known as Djilali Bounaama) who was born in the city in 1926, and who was the head of the fourth region during the Algerian War of Independence against the French Army (1954–1962) before being killed in Blida on August 8, 1961.

Bordj Bounaama was part of the Departement d'Oran during the French occupation, before joining Al-Asnam (now Chlef) after independence. With the change of name in 1975, it joined the wilaya of Tiaret, before becoming part of the wilaya of Tissemsilt created during administrative redistribution in 1984.
