= Beni Chaib =

- Commune and town
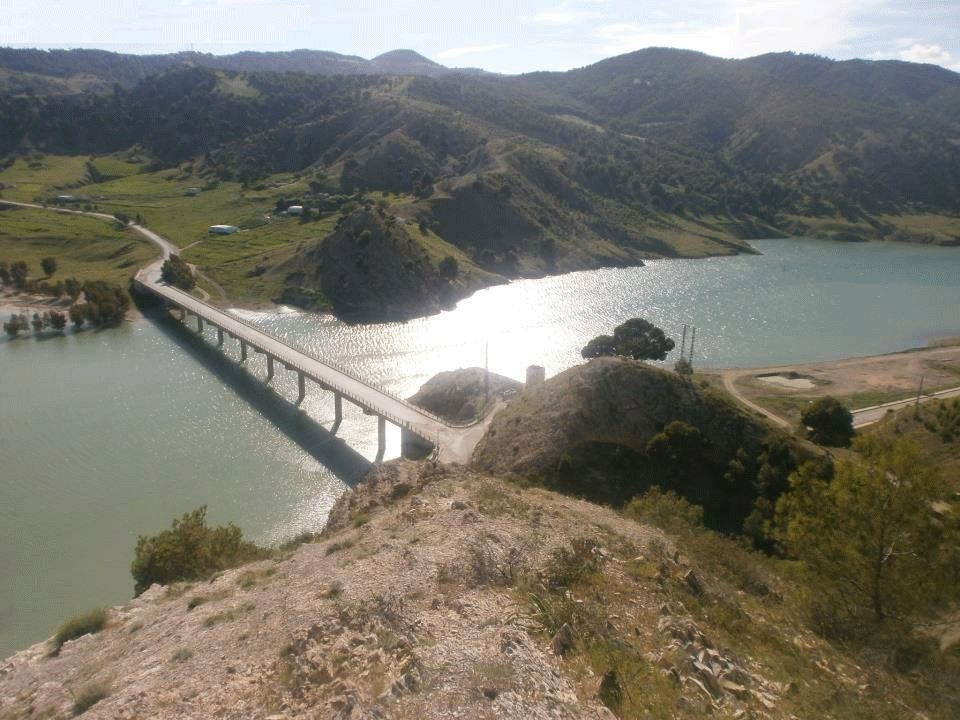

- Location within Algeria
- Country: Algeria
- Province: Tissemsilt Province
- Time zone: UTC+1 (CET)

Beni Chaib is a town and commune in Tissemsilt Province in northern Algeria.
