= Larbaa, Tissemsilt =

Coordinates: 35°54′47″N 1°28′31″E

Larbaa
- Commune and town
- Interactive map of Larbaa
- Country: Algeria
- Province: Tissemsilt Province
- Time zone: UTC+1 (CET)

Larbaa is a town and commune in Tissemsilt Province in northern Algeria.
