= Sidi Slimane, Tissemsilt =

Coordinates: 35°51′36″N 1°40′52″E

Sidi Slimane
- Commune and town
- Interactive map of Sidi Slimane
- Country: Algeria
- Province: Tissemsilt Province
- Time zone: UTC+1 (CET)

Sidi Slimane is a town and commune in Tissemsilt Province in northern Algeria.
