= Sidi Boutouchent =

Coordinates: 35°49′31″N 1°57′05″E

- Commune and town
- Interactive map of Sidi Boutouchent
- Country: Algeria
- Province: Tissemsilt Province
- Time zone: UTC+1 (CET)

Sidi Boutouchent is a town and commune in Tissemsilt Province in northern Algeria.
