= Théniet El Had National Park =

National park in Algeria

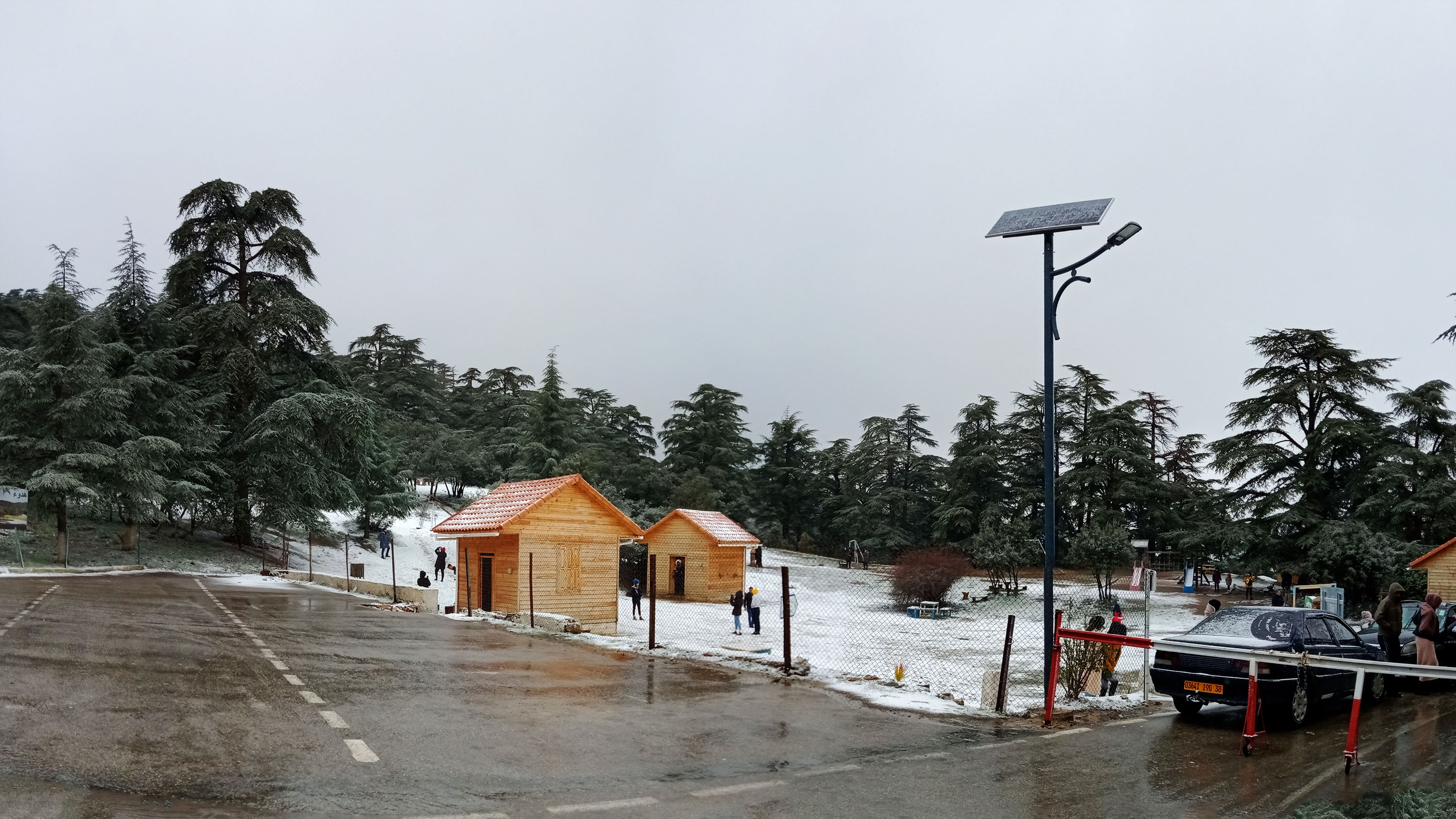
- Inside a forest within the park

Highest point
- Peak: Ras el Braret
- Elevation: 1,787 m (5,863 ft)

Geography
- Country: Algeria
- IUCN category II (national park)
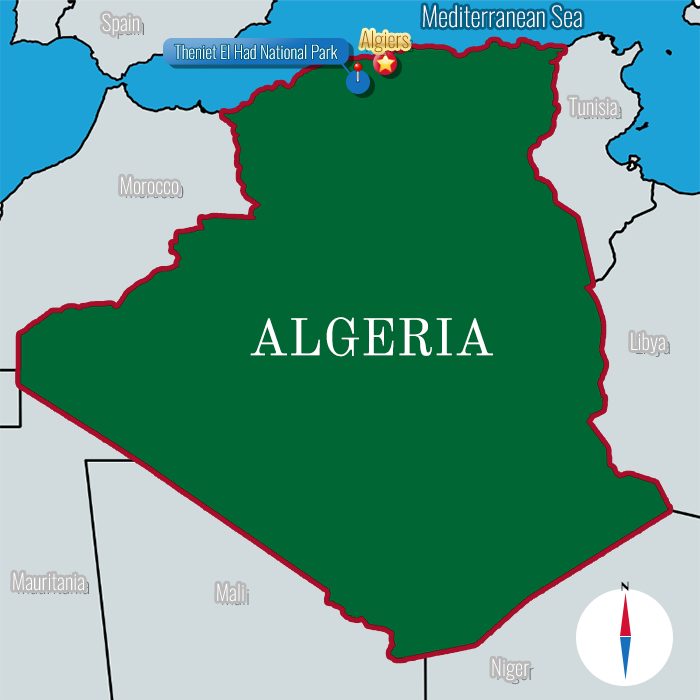
- EL MEDDAD National Park in Algeria
- Location: Tissemsilt Province, Algeria
- Nearest city: Théniet El Haâd
- Coordinates: 35°40′N 01°49′E
- Area: 34.24 km^{2} (13.22 sq mi)
- Established: 1983 (Protected from 1929)

The Théniet El Had National Park is one of the 10 national parks of Algeria. It is located in Tissemsilt Province, named after Théniet El Haâd, a town near this park.
The park was designated as Algeria's first protected national park on July 23, 1983.

== Description ==
3,424 hectares make up the Theniet El Had cedar forest, of which 1,000 hectares are found in the Ouarsenis Massif of the Atlas Tellien. The park that was first bounded on 1,500 hectares by order No. 3766 of August 3, 1929 by the Algerian government was superseded by the national park, which was established by decree No. 83-459 on July 23, 1983.

Raising to 1,787 meters, Ras El Braret is the highest peak. Kef Siga, at 1,784 meters, is the next highest point, and is distinguished by a massive rock on top of which a giant "parasol" cedar stands out conspicuously. At "Rond Point" (1,461 m), the two summits are dominant.

The park starts by a wide clearing beside Theniet El Had, encircled by centuries-old cedars, a genuine sea of greenery. Built in 1887 by M. Jourdan, the financial representative of Theniet El Had, the site is improved by a woodland house and a chalet named after him, Chalet Jourdan.

Locals refer to the cedar forest as "El Meddad" It contains multiple ferruginous carbonate springs with a temperature of 12°, which are suggested for intestinal disorders and ulcers (Ain Harhar, Tirsout, Ouertane, Djèdj El-Ma, Sidi Abdoun - Sulphurous water).

There are recreational and ecological benefits to the cedar forest of Theniet El Had. The "sylvan nobility" is who the cedar is. The site is presently being worked to protect by the Cedar National Park. Currently, it is housed in an impressive structure that is a work of modern design, rising 1,100 meters above the surrounding landscape and nestled in the center of a cedar forest. The establishment features a cedar wood cottage that adorns the internal courtyard.

Guy de Maupassant wrote: "But what left me with the dearest memories of this excursion were the afternoon walks along the slightly wooded paths on these rolling hillsides from where one overlooks an immense undulating and tawny country from the blue sea to the Ouarsenis mountain range which bears on its peaks the cedar forest of Téniet-el-Had"- Allouma, by Guy de Maupassant. Text published in L'Écho de Paris, February 1889, then in the collection La main gauche.

== Vegetation ==
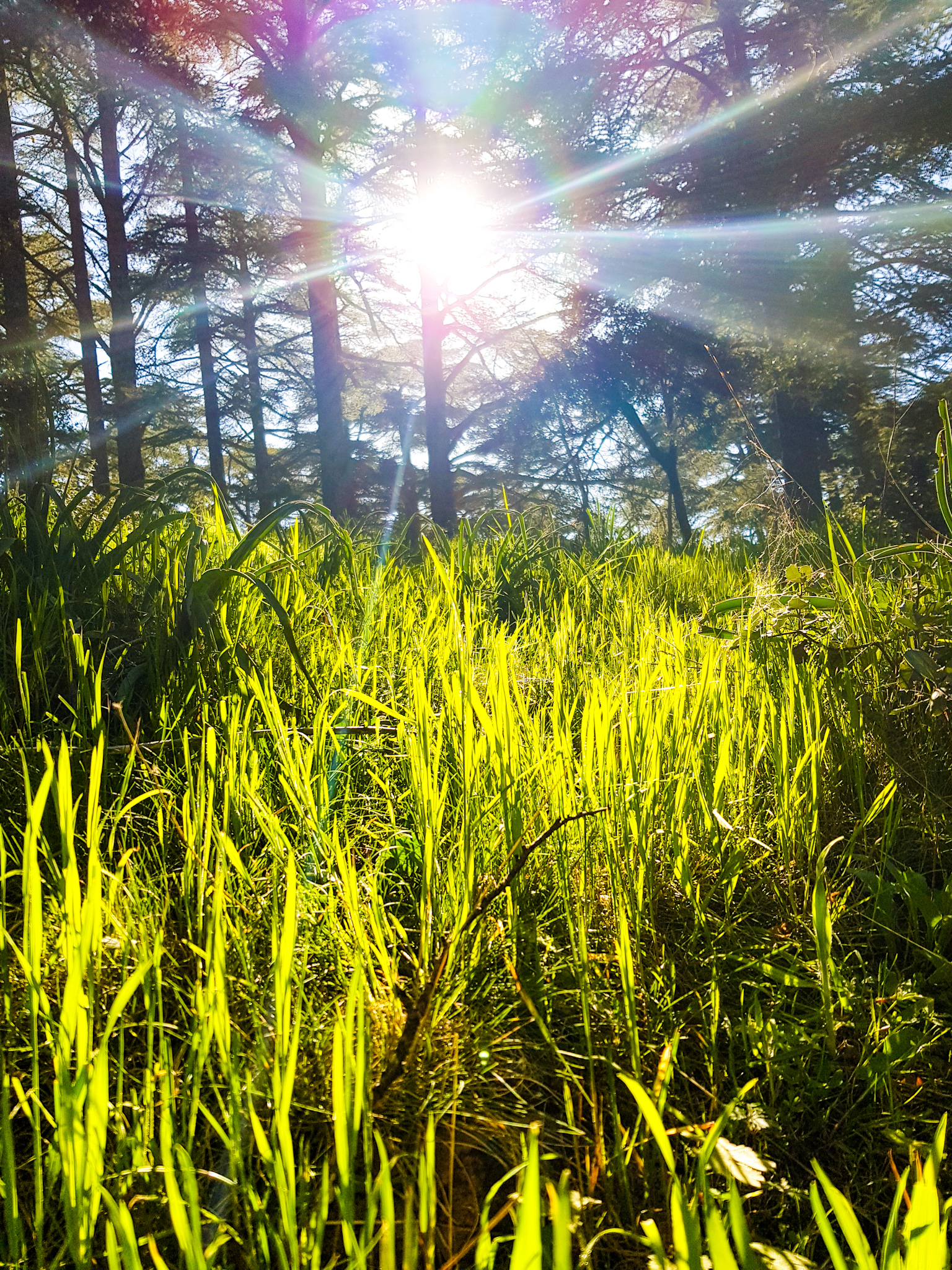
Vegetation of the Park

The forested sector occupies roughly 3/4 of the park area, while the rest is made up of small ground-level plants. Three distinct layers can be distinguished from each other:

=== Trees ===
- Atlas cedar (Cedrus atlantica): on the southern side of the park, a mixture of both modern and ancient cedars is present, with 10 to 20% being the Atlas cedar.
- Cork oak (Quercus suber)
- Pine
- Trees between 2 and 7 meters tall in the layer are a mix of species:
  - Holm oak (Quercus ilex) can be found on the northern side.
  - Cade (Juniperus oxycedrus) can be found on the southern side.
  - Gall oak (Quercus lusitanica) can also be found on the southern side.

=== Grass and flowers ===
- Alexanders (Smyrnium olusatrum)
- Geranium atlanticum
- Viola
- Common ivy (Hedera helix)
- Chrysanthemum

== Fauna ==
Seventeen species of mammals live in the park, nine of which are protected, also 27 bird species live here, of which 60% are actively breeding here. In 2014, a skink of the genus Chalcides was recorded in the park for the first time. While the specimen morphologically resembled the Algerian three-toed skink (Chalcides mertensi), genetic analysis revealed it to be more closely related to the small three-toed skink (Chalcides minutus), a vulnerable species.

== Gallery ==
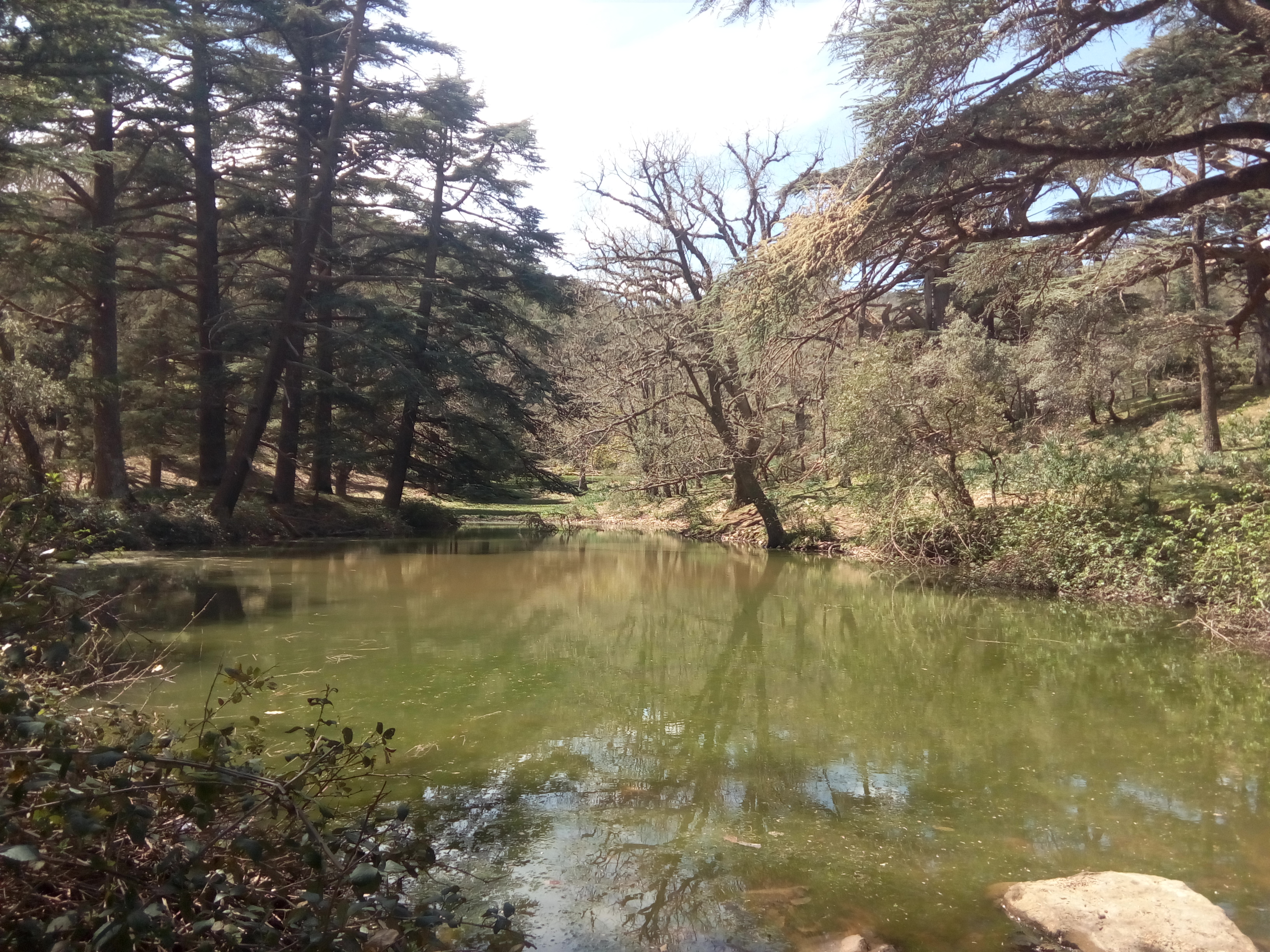

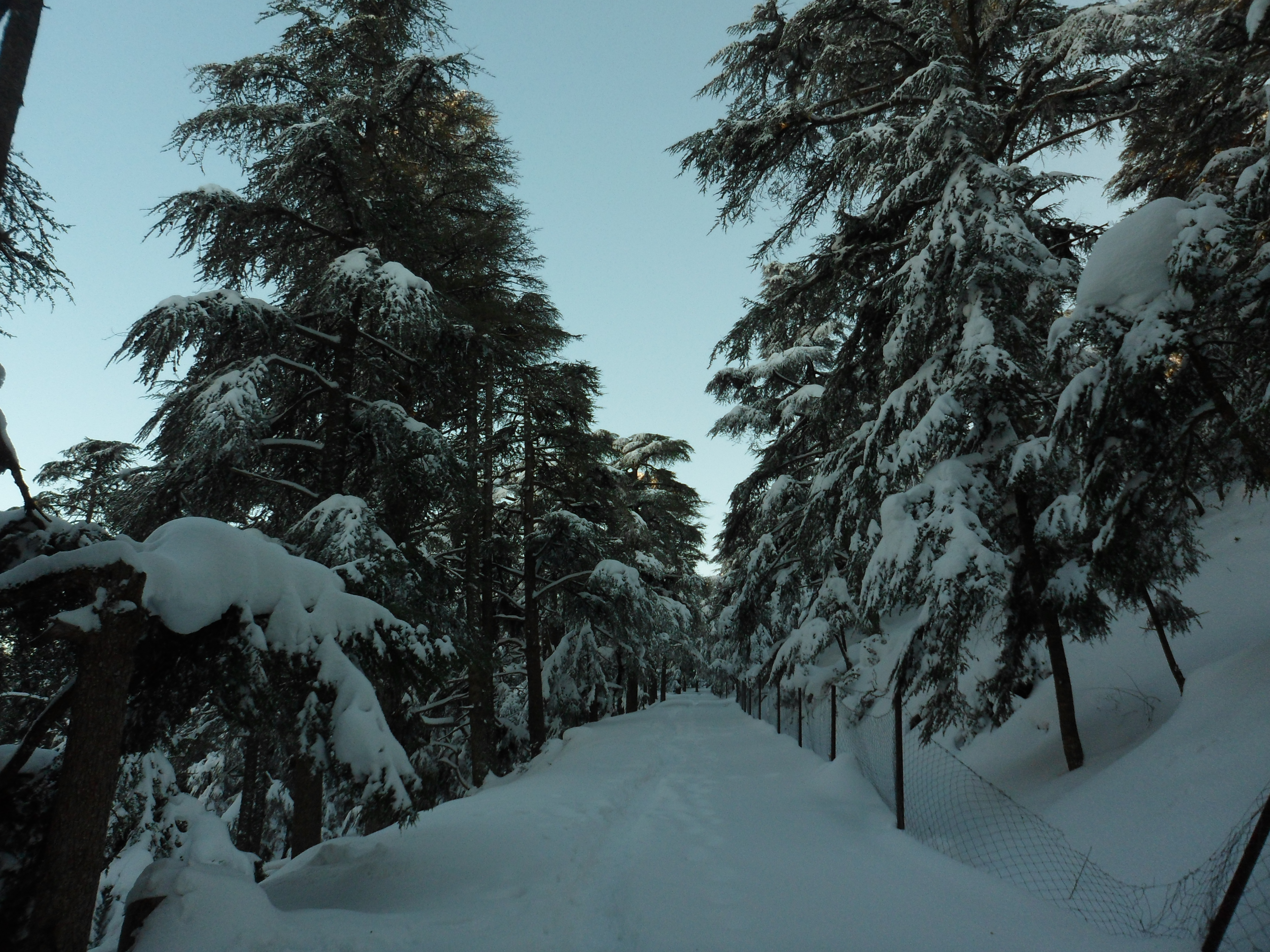

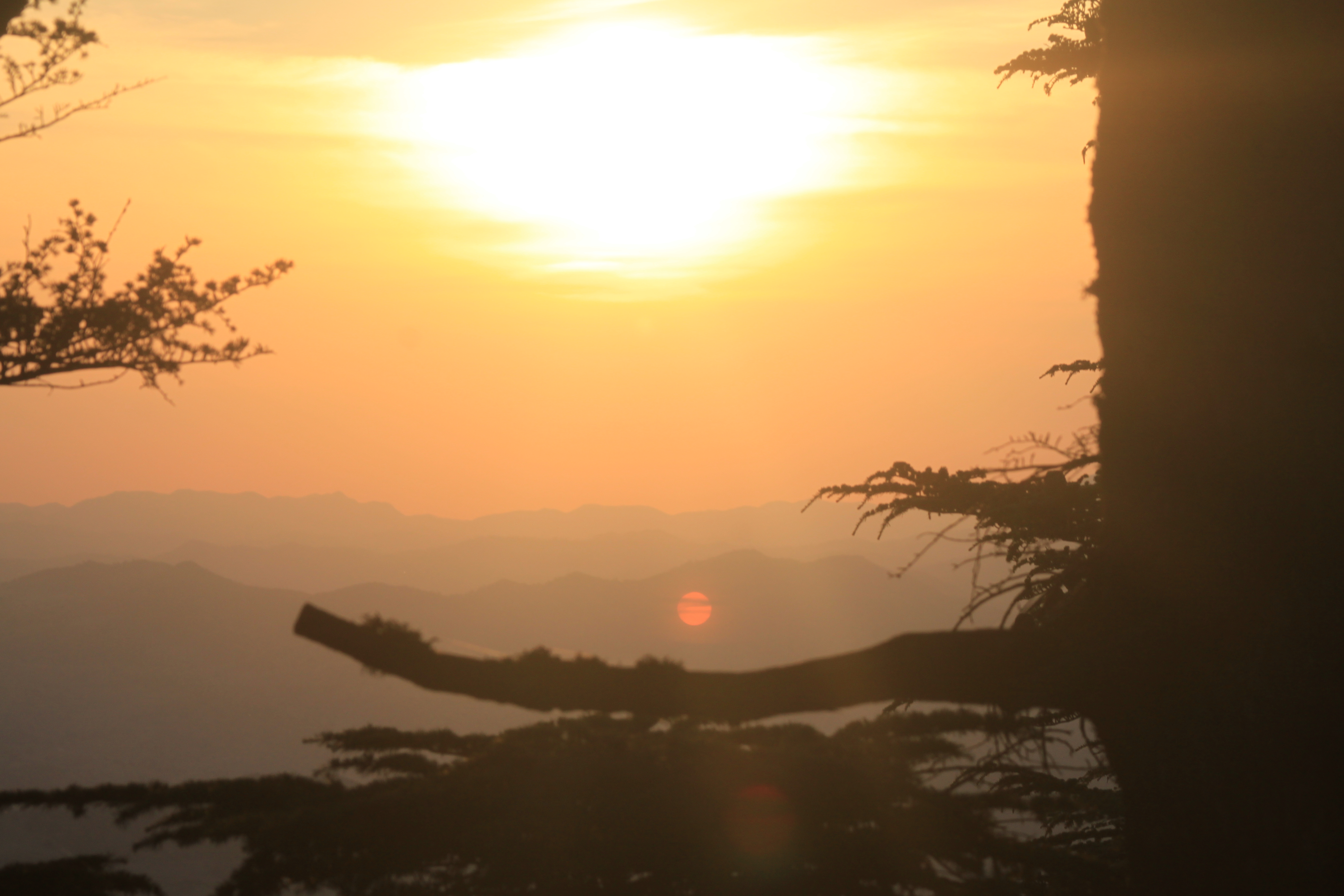

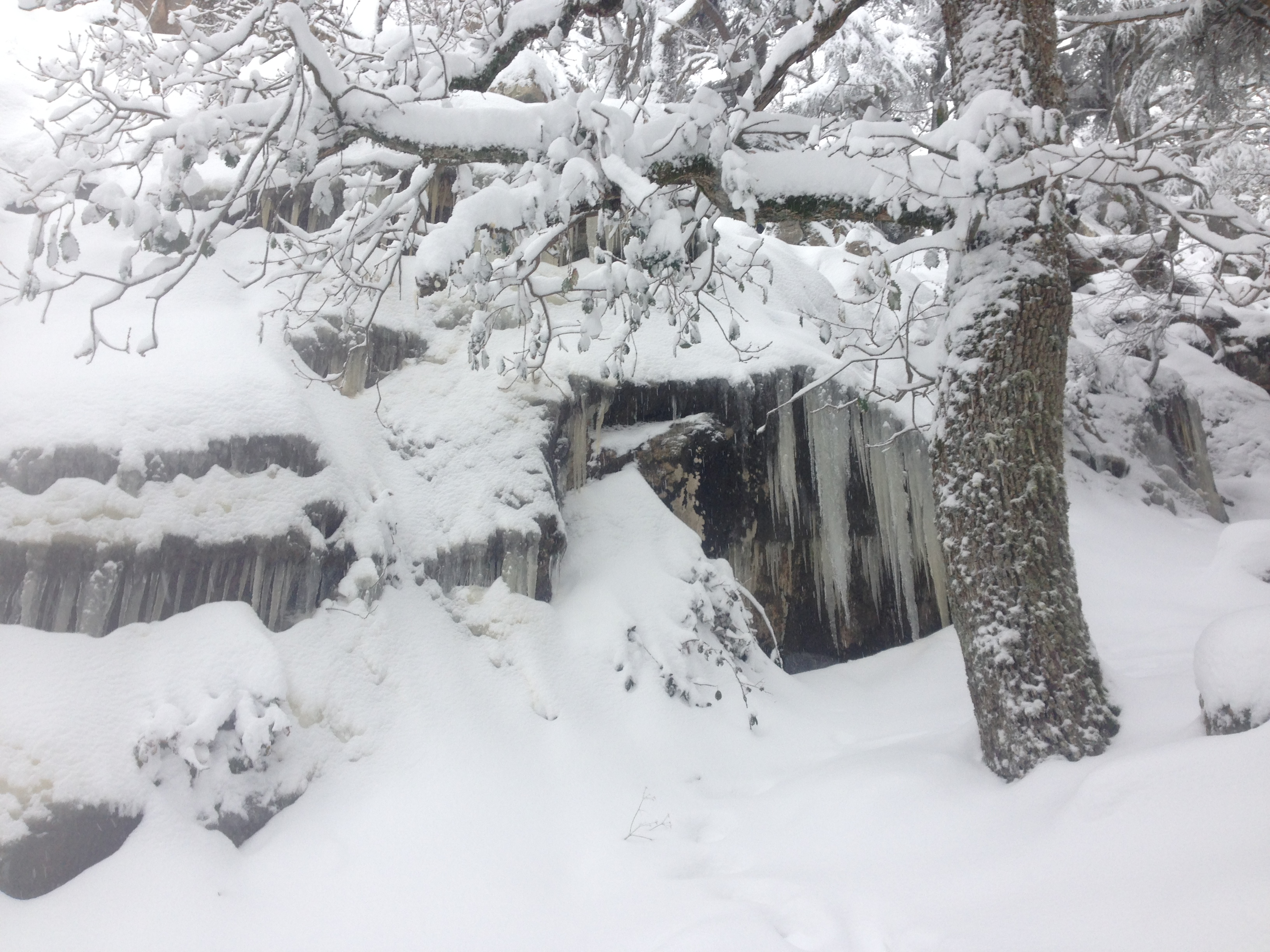

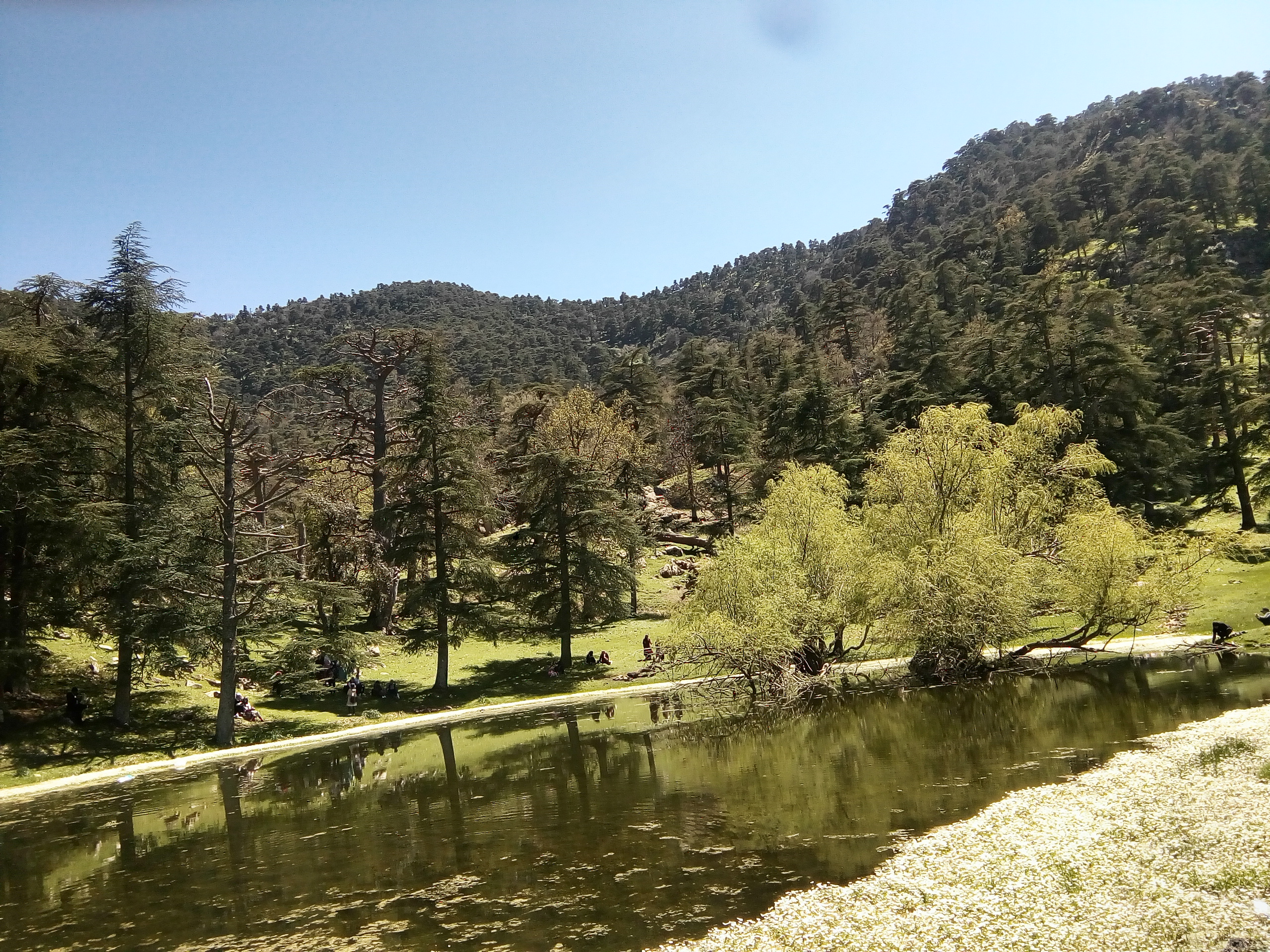

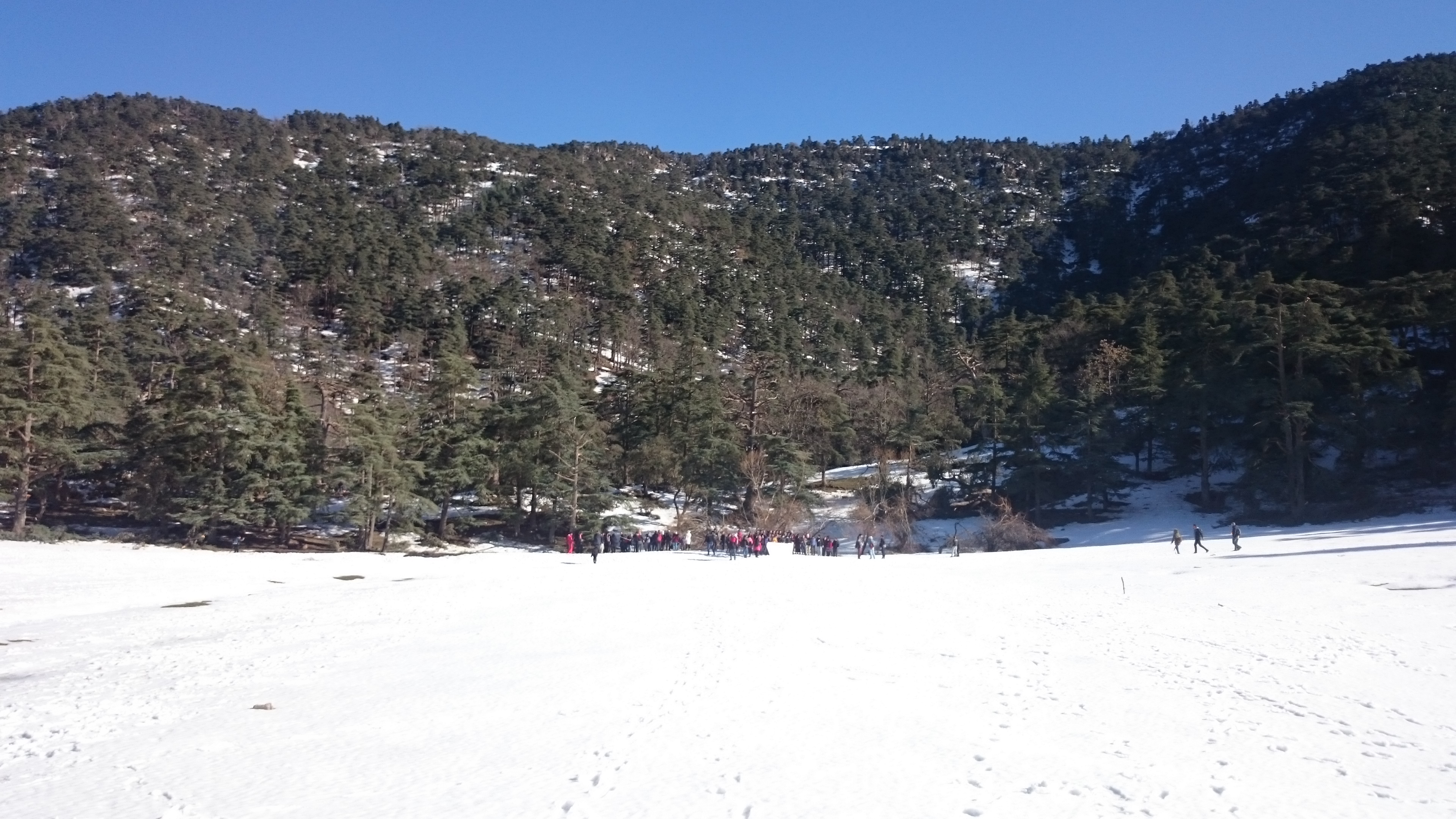

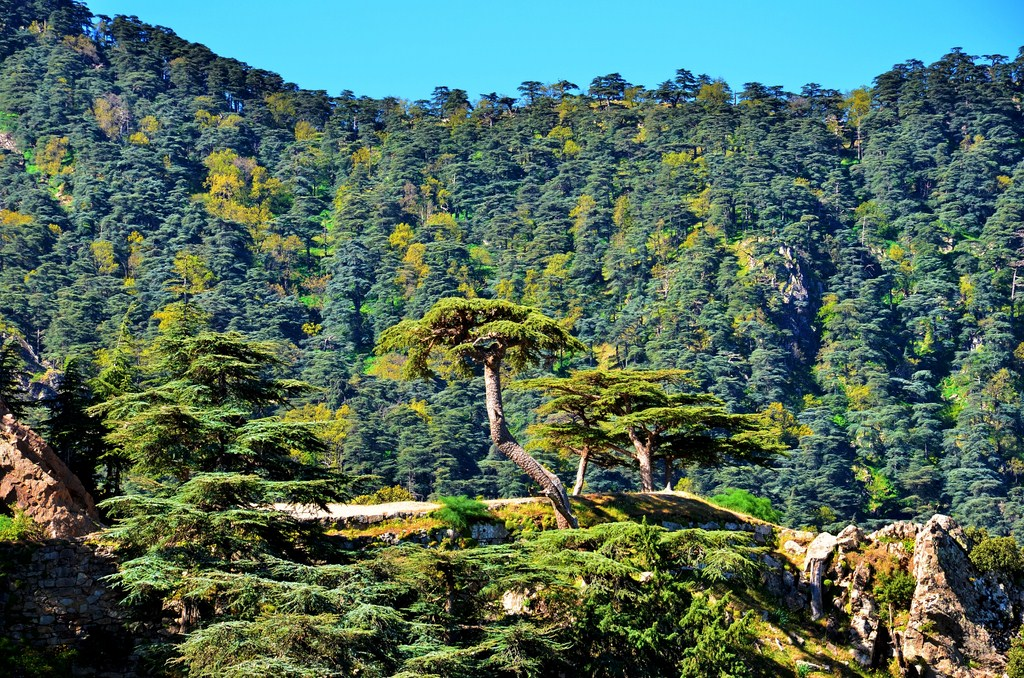

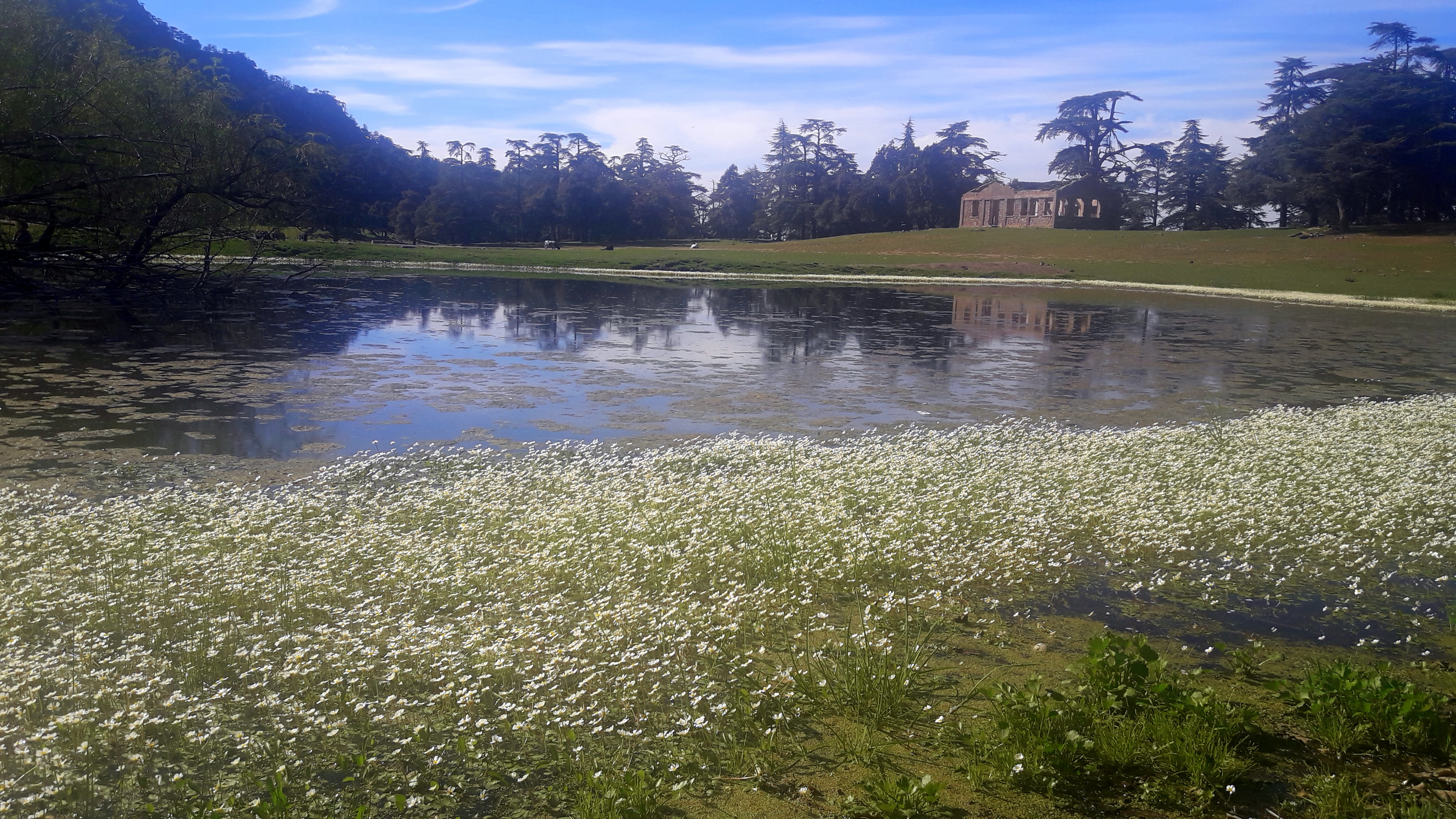

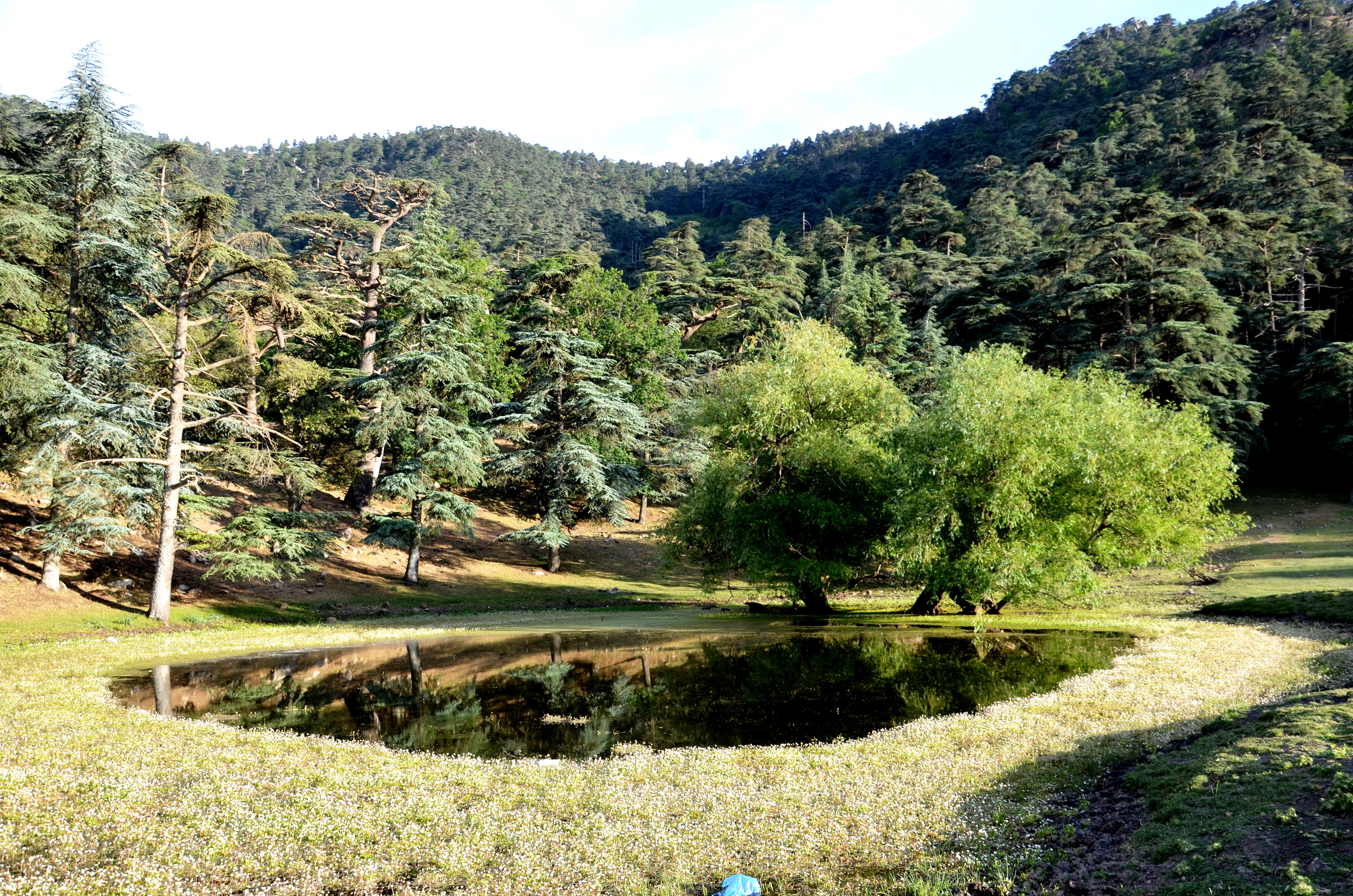

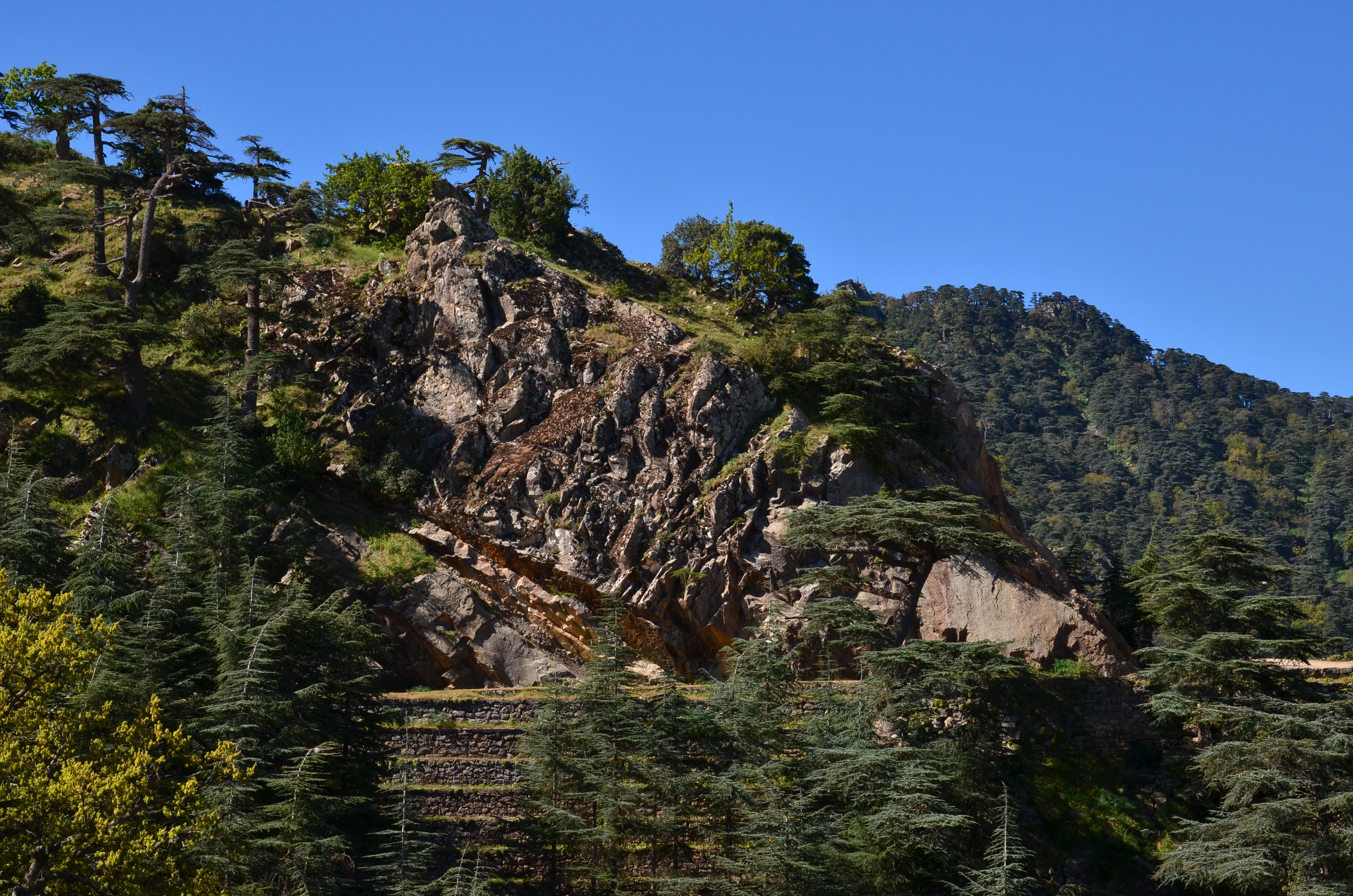

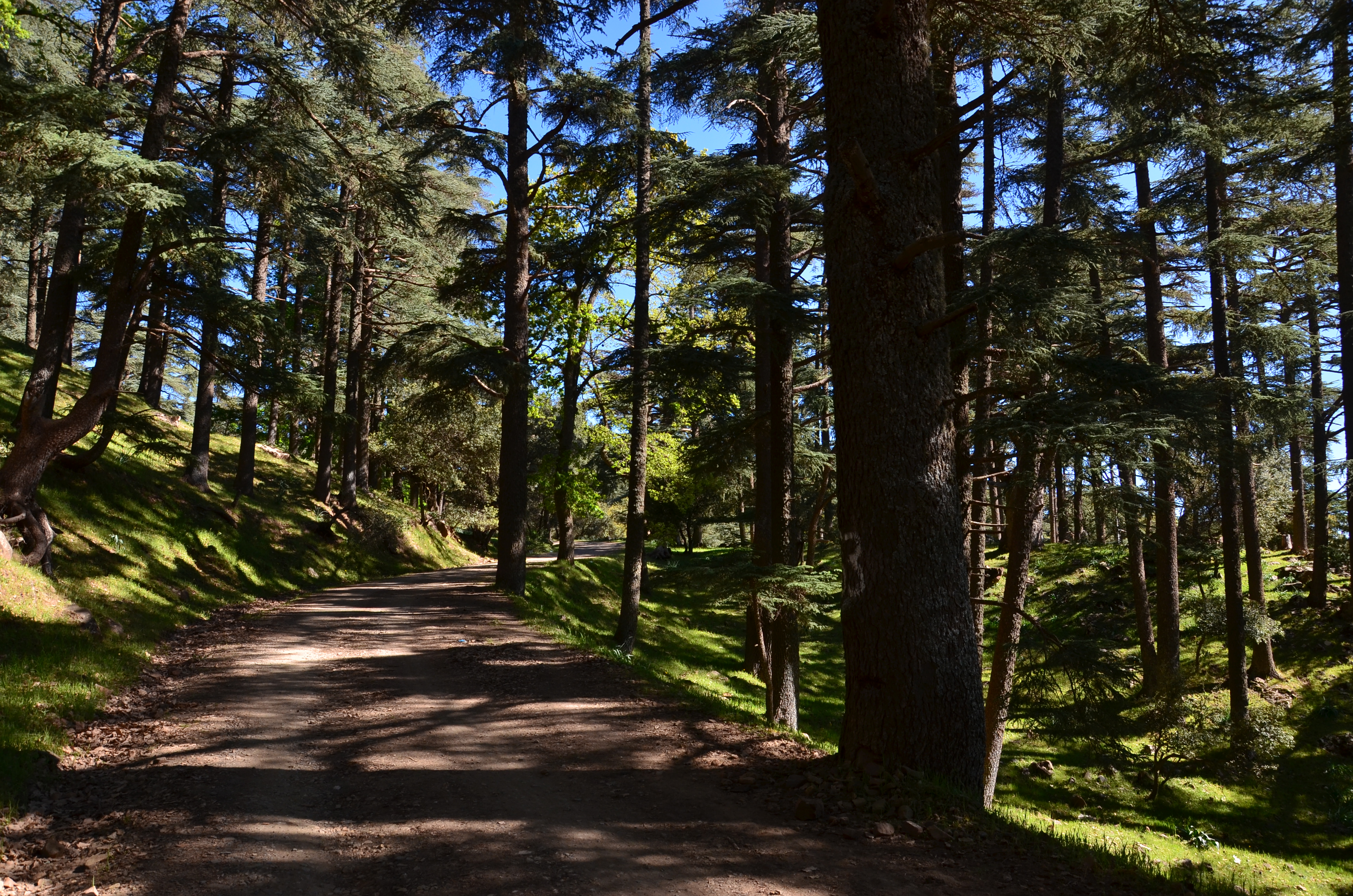

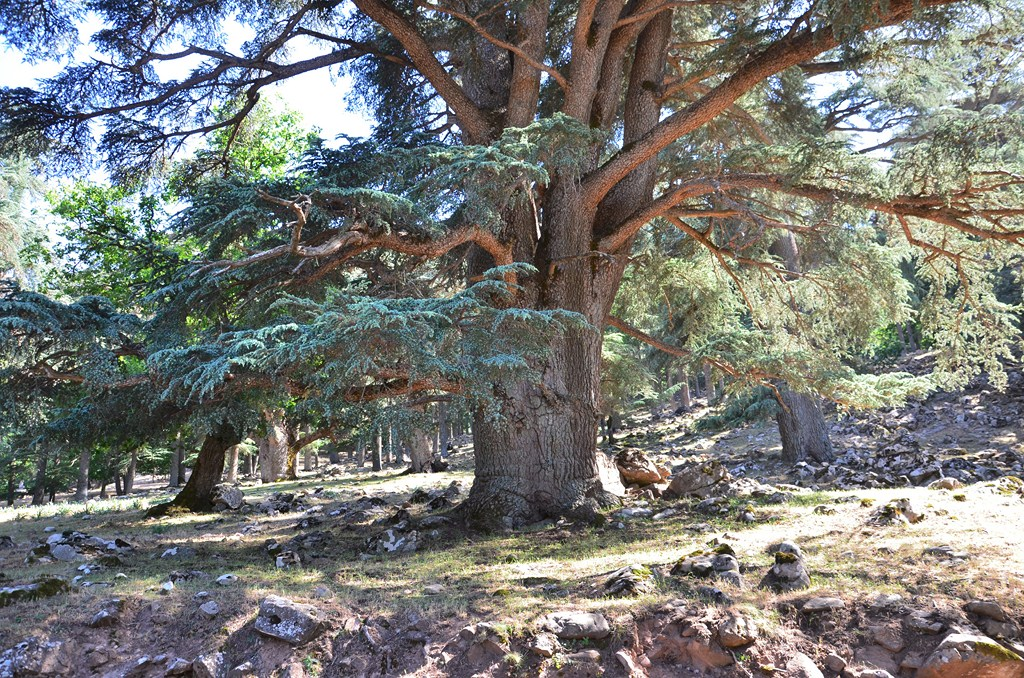

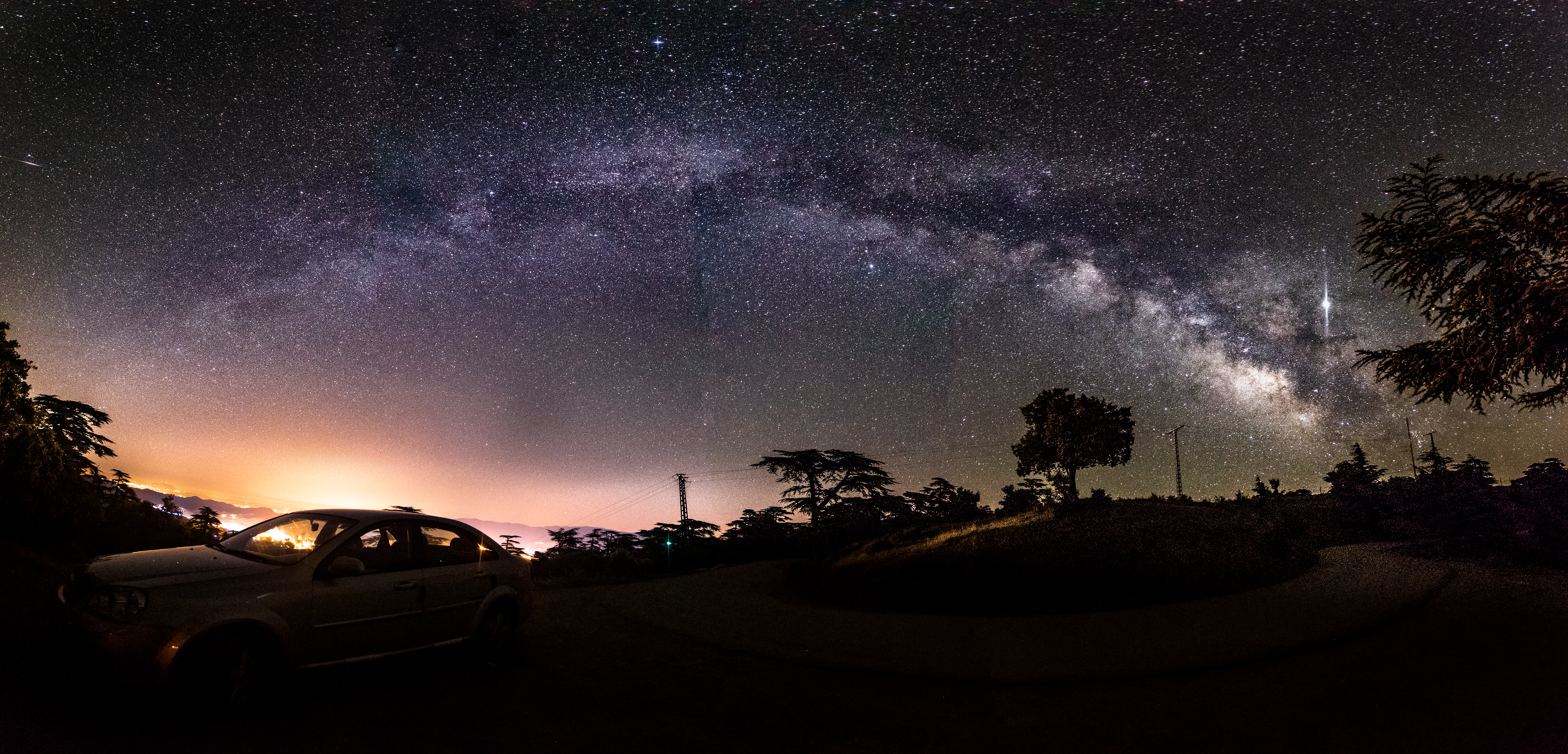

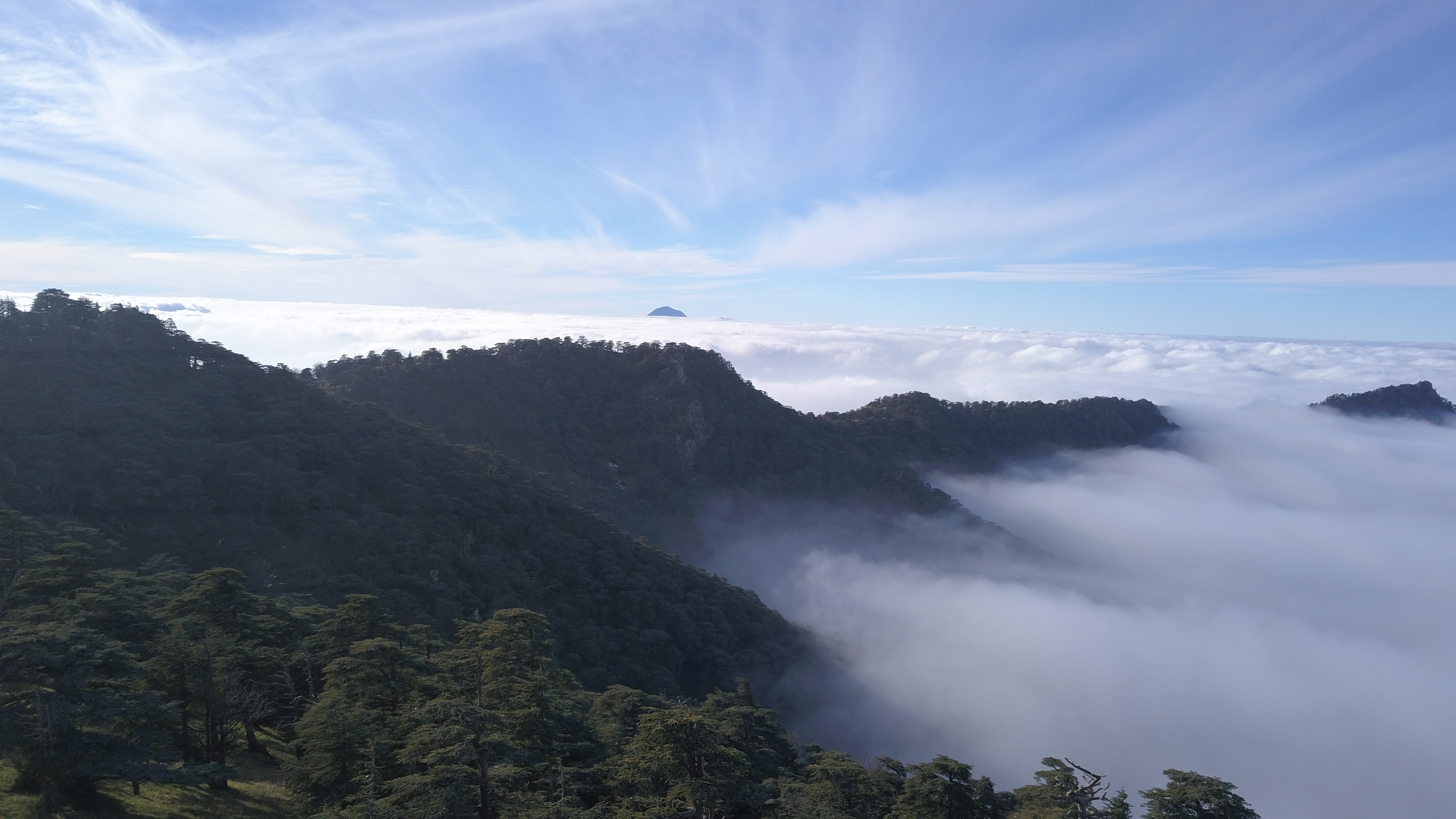

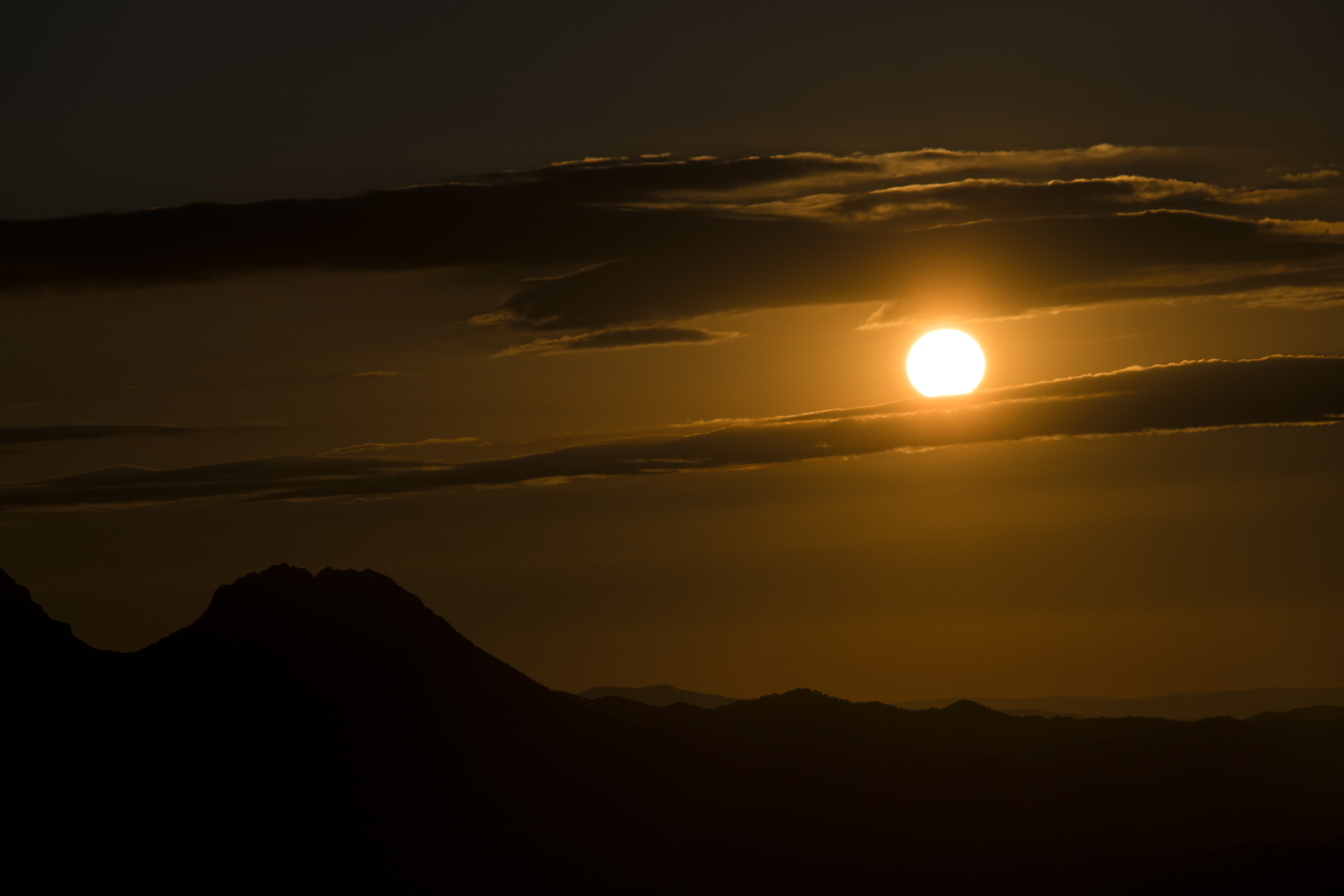

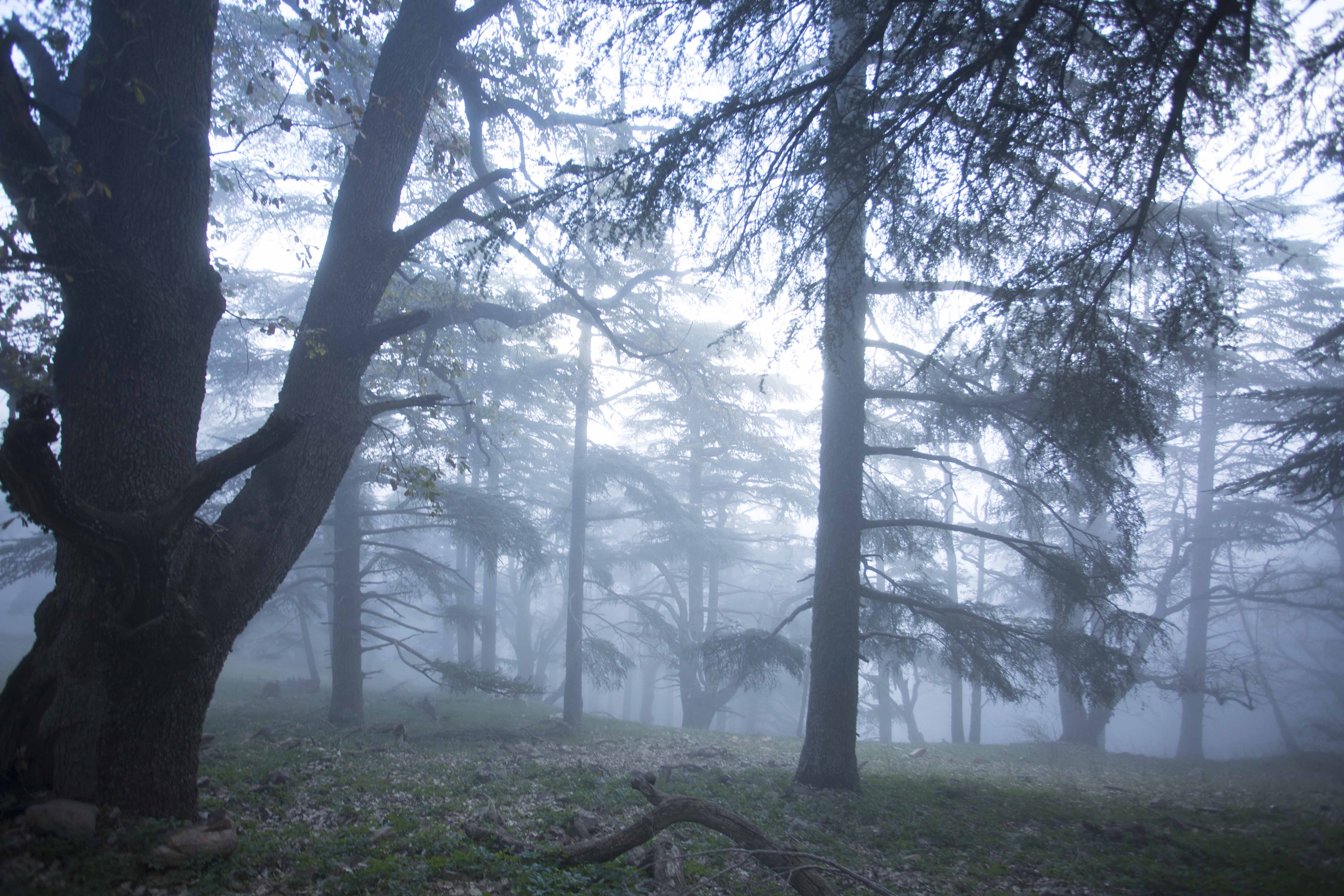
