= Beni Lahcene =

Coordinates: 35°48′47″N 1°41′22″E

- Commune and town
- Interactive map of Beni Lahcene
- Country: Algeria
- Province: Tissemsilt Province
- Time zone: UTC+1 (CET)

Beni Lahcene is a town and commune in Tissemsilt Province in northern Algeria.
