= Ammari =

Coordinates: 35.5771°N 1.6623°E

- Commune and town
- Interactive map of Ammari
- Country: Algeria
- Province: Tissemsilt Province
- Time zone: UTC+1 (CET)

Ammari is a town and commune in Tissemsilt Province in northern Algeria.
