= Bordj El Emir Abdelkader =

- Commune and town
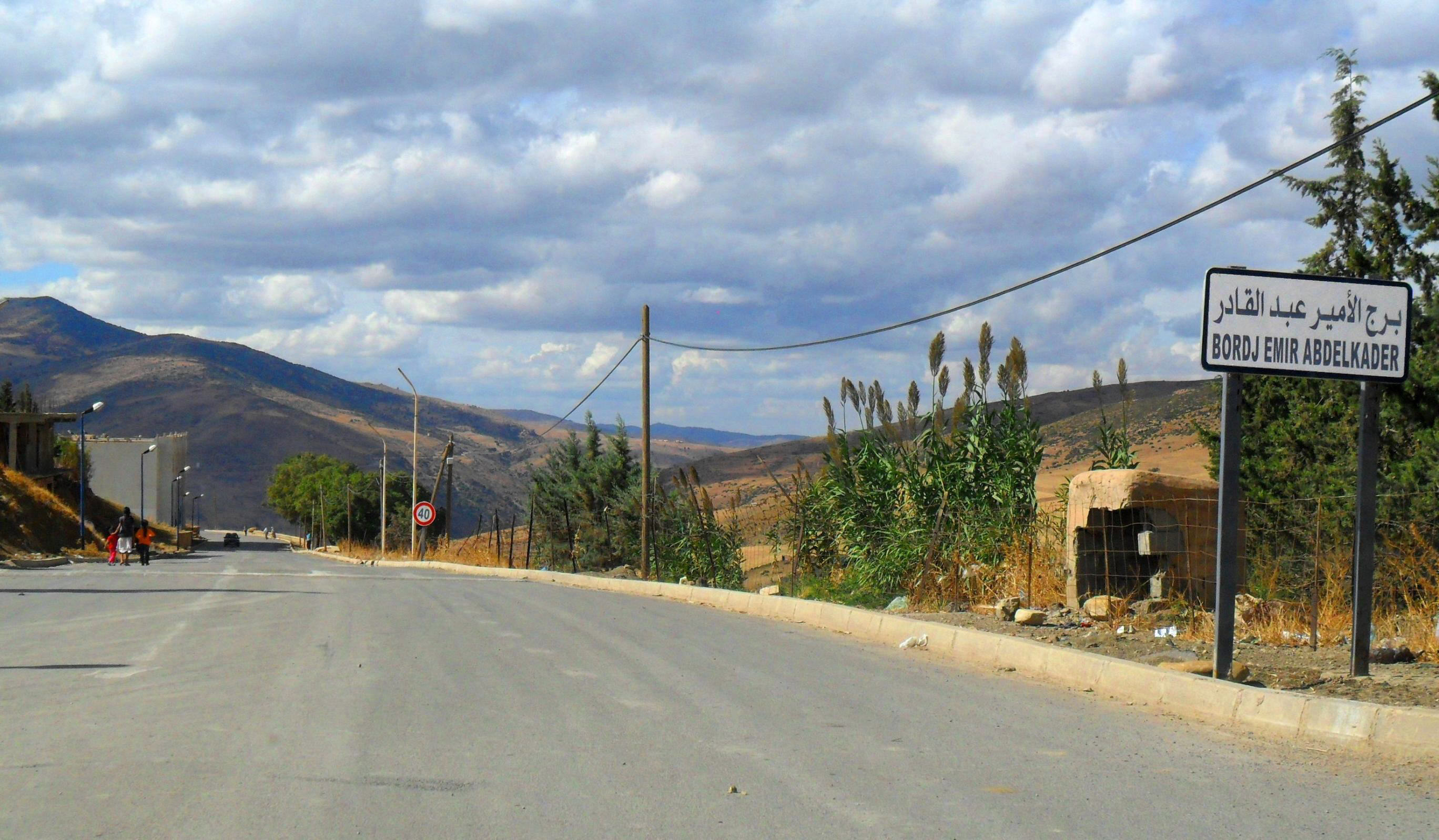

- Location within Algeria
- Coordinates: 35°54′57″N 2°16′15″E
- Country: Algeria
- Province: Tissemsilt Province
- Time zone: UTC+1 (CET)

Bordj El Emir Abdelkader, formerly known as Taza, is a town and commune in Tissemsilt Province in northern Algeria.
