= Maacem =

Coordinates: 35°39′35″N 1°33′12″E

- Commune and town
- Interactive map of Maacem
- Country: Algeria
- Province: Tissemsilt Province
- Time zone: UTC+1 (CET)

Maacem is a town and commune in Tissemsilt Province in northern Algeria.
