= Melaab =

Coordinates: 35°43′N 1°20′E

- Commune and town
- Interactive map of Melaab
- Country: Algeria
- Province: Tissemsilt Province
- Time zone: UTC+1 (CET)

Melaab is a town and commune in Tissemsilt Province in northern Algeria.
