= Laayoune, Algeria =

Coordinates: 35°42′N 2°00′E

Laayoune
- Commune and town
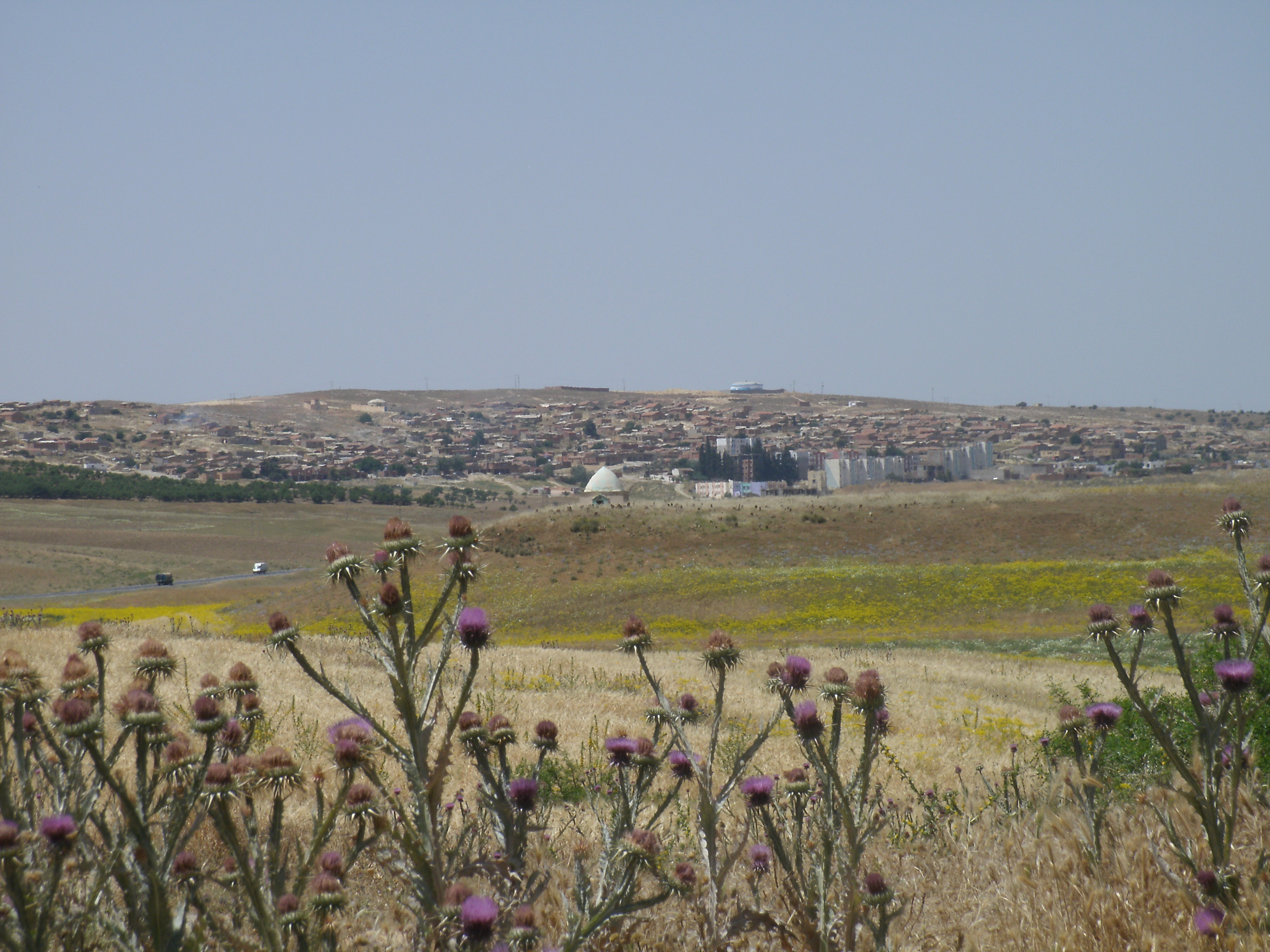
- Interactive map of Laayoune
- Country: Algeria
- Province: Tissemsilt Province
- Time zone: UTC+1 (CET)

Laayoune is a town and commune in Tissemsilt Province in northern Algeria.
