= Sidi Lantri =

Coordinates: 35°42′05″N 1°24′08″E

- Commune and town
- Interactive map of Sidi Lantri
- Country: Algeria
- Province: Tissemsilt Province
- Time zone: UTC+1 (CET)

Sidi Lantri is a town and commune in Tissemsilt Province in northern Algeria.
