= Ouarsenis =

Mountain range in Algeria

Ouarsenis Range
- Adrar en Warsnis ⵡⴰⵔⵙⵏⵉⵙ / Ouarsnis / الونشريس
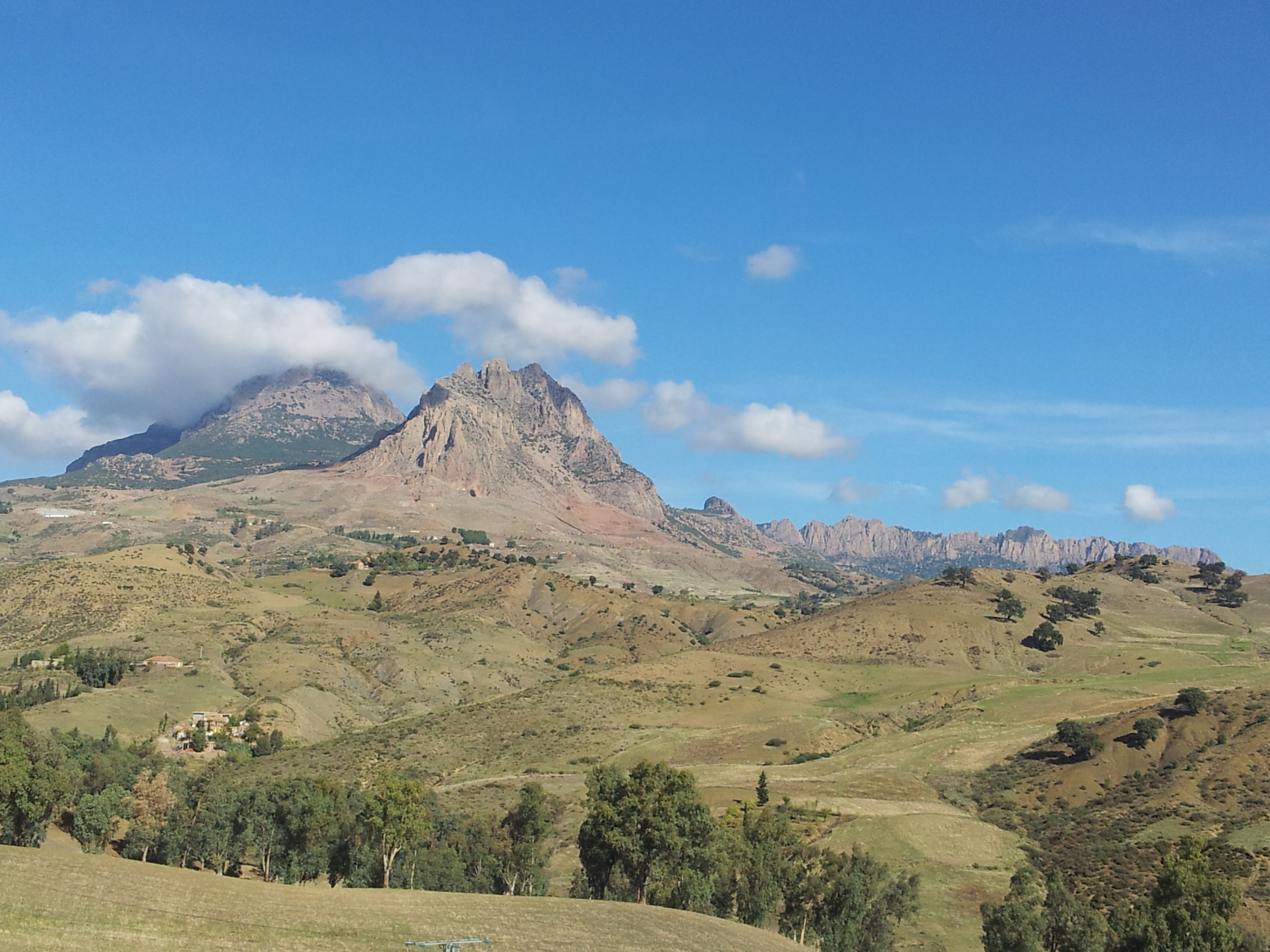
- View of the Ouarsenis Range near Tamalehat Commune

Highest point
- Peak: Mount Sidi Amar
- Elevation: 1,985 m (6,512 ft)
- Prominence: 1,105 m (3,625 ft)
- Listing: Ribu
- Coordinates: 35°52′0″N 1°37′0″E

Geography
- Location within Algeria
- Location: NW Algeria
- Parent range: Tell Atlas

Geology
- Orogeny: Alpine orogeny
- Rock age: Miocene

The Ouarsenis or Ouanchariss (Berber language: ⵡⴰⵔⵙⵏⵉⵙ, Warsnis (meaning "nothing higher") Adrar en Warsnis, Arabic: الونشريس) is a mountain range and inhabited region in northwestern Algeria.

== Geography ==
The range is located at about 80 km south of the Mediterranean, between the basin of the Chelif River in the north and in the east, the Oued Mina in the west and the Sersou plateau in the south. It reaches its maximum elevation of 1,985 m at the Mount Sidi Amar, near Bordj Bounaama at about 60 km west of Tissemsilt. Other important summits are Achaoun (1808 m), Djebel Meddad (1787 m), Kef Siga (1784 m), Sra Abdelkader (1776), Ras El Brarit (1750 m), Mont Belkheiret (1620 m), Djebel Amrouna (1512 m), Mount Tamedrara, and Rond Point des Cèdres (1461 m), Rokba Atba (1300 m). The mountain range area is inhabited by Berbers.

== Fauna ==
The mountain forests are home to several animals such as wolves, foxes, caracals, boars, hyenas, hedgehogs. The area was previously inhabited by lions and panthers. Jean Auguste Margueritte reported that a single person from Beni Mahrez tribe near Theniet El Hed killed 14 lions and 3 panthers in the 1840s.

== Protected areas ==
Although part of its slopes have been used traditionally to grow cereals, the range still has relatively large natural Atlas cedar forests.

The Théniet El Had National Park is a protected area located in the foothills of the Ouarsenis Range.

== See also ==
- List of mountains in Algeria
- Tell Atlas
