= Ouled Bessem =

- Commune and town

- Location within Algeria
- Country: Algeria
- Province: Tissemsilt Province
- Time zone: UTC+1 (CET)

Ouled Bessem is a town and commune in Tissemsilt Province in northern Algeria.
