= Theniet El Had =

- Town / District / Commune

- Location within Algeria
- Coordinates: 35°52′15″N 2°01′44″E
- Country: Algeria
- Province: Tissemsilt

Population (2008)
  - Total: 27,628
- Postal code: 38003 (38200)
- Calling code: +213 (0) 4648

Theniet El Had is a town, district and commune in Algeria. It is located near the Théniet El Had National Park.

== Notable people ==
- Boualem Sansal, French-Algerian author.
