= Khemisti =

Khemisti خميستي
- Commune and town
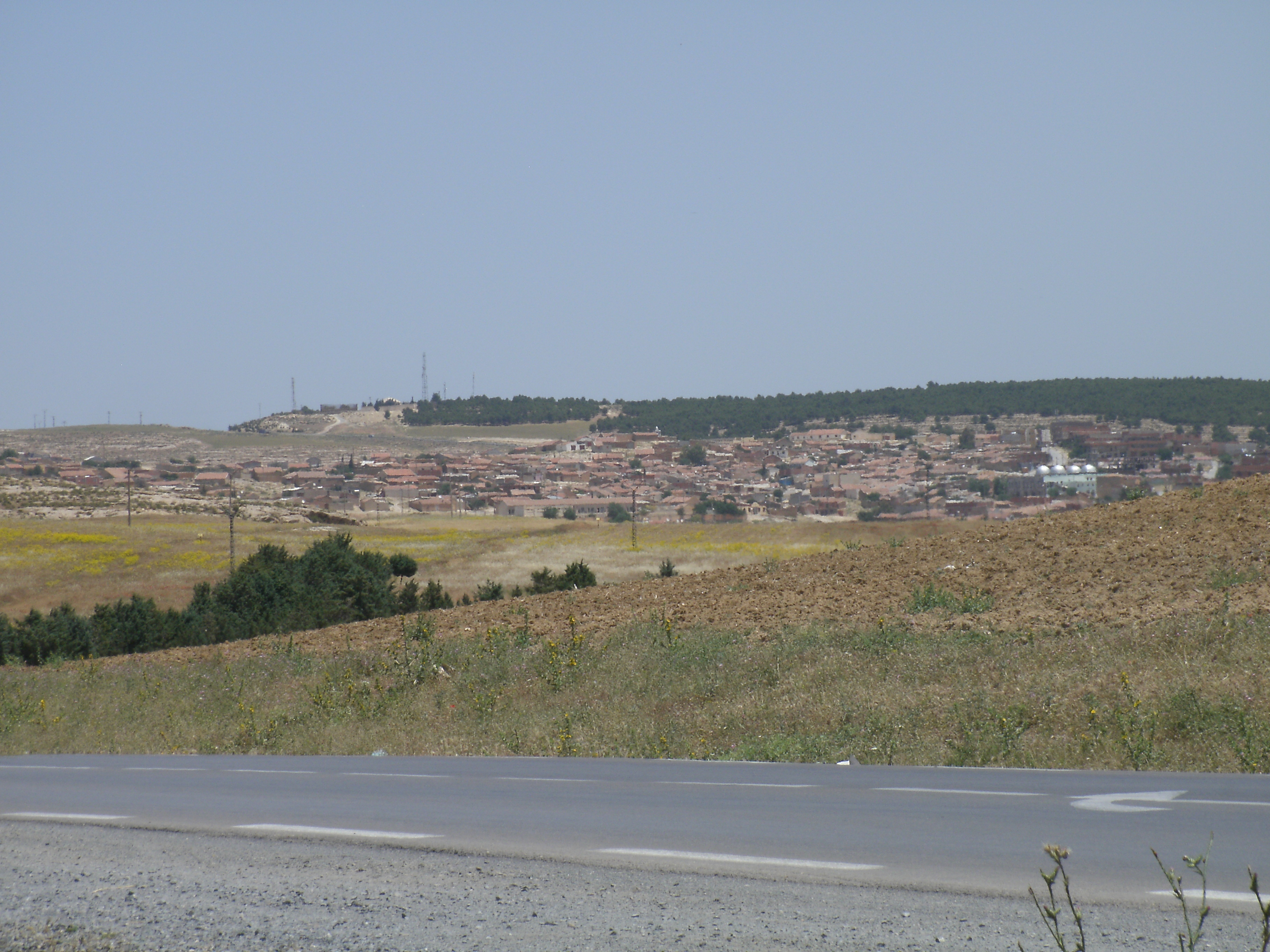

- Location within Algeria
- Coordinates: 35.6667°N 1.95°E
- Country: Algeria
- Province: Tissemsilt Province
- Time zone: UTC+1 (CET)

Khemisti is a town and commune in Tissemsilt Province in northern Algeria. It was called Bourbaki when Algeria was a colony of France.

== History ==
In Roman times, it was called Columnata and belonged to the Roman province of Mauretania Caesariensis.

Bishop Martialis of Columnata was one of the Catholic bishops whom the Arian Vandal king Huneric summoned to Carthage in 484 and then exiled.

No longer a residential bishopric, Columnata is today listed by the Catholic Church as a titular see.
