= Tamalaht =

Coordinates: 35°48′45″N 1°37′25″E

- Commune and town
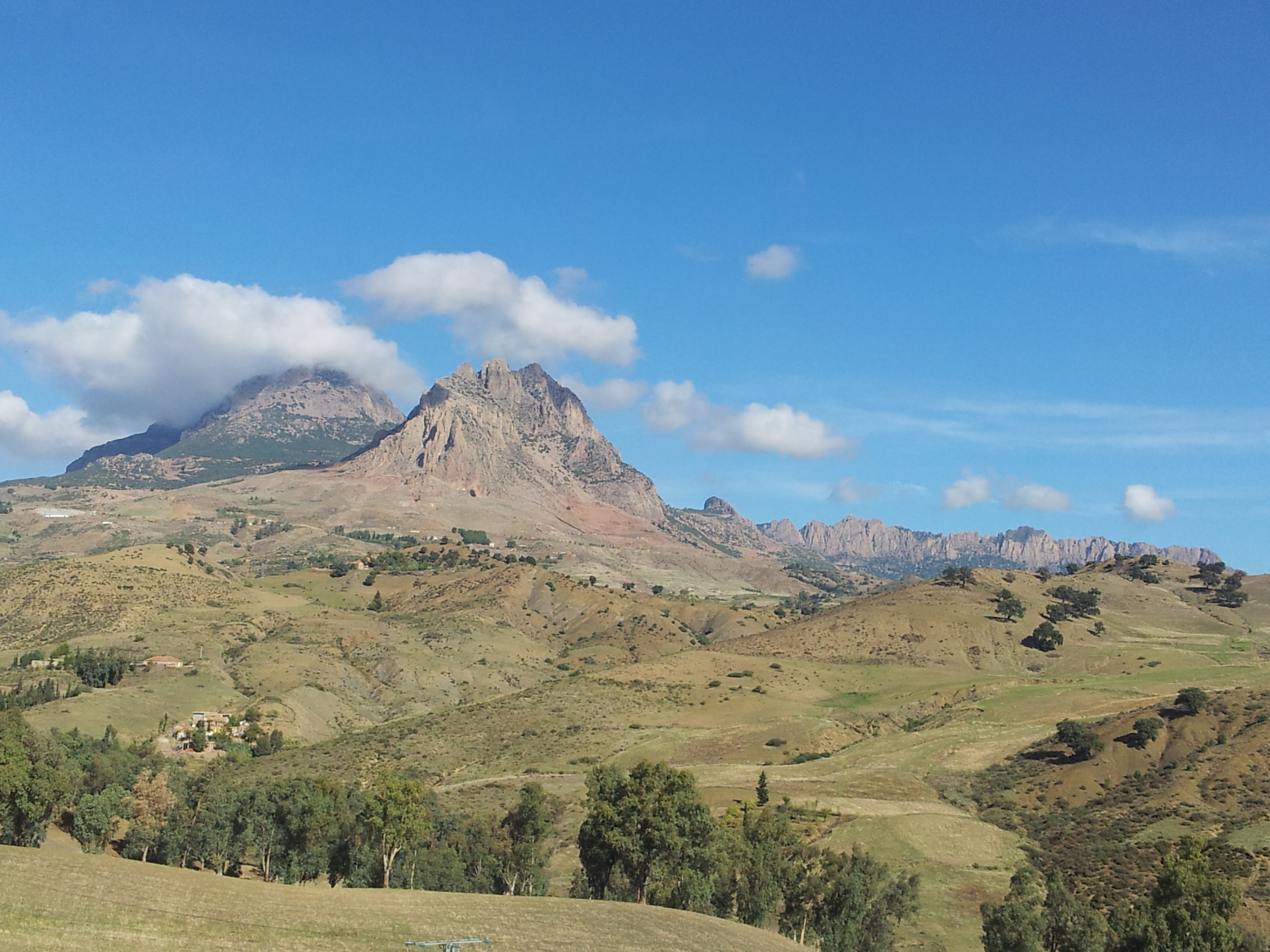
- Ouarsenis range from Tamalaht. Kef Sidi Belkheiret to the right and Kef Sid Amar (1985 m) to the left

- Country: Algeria
- Province: Tissemsilt Province
- Time zone: UTC+1 (CET)

Tamalaht is a town and commune in Tissemsilt Province in northern Algeria. It has a population of roughly 7,600 people, founded in the 1980s

== Size ==
Tamalaht is a moderately sized town, being a 10.2 km walk from farthest east to west and same from farthest north to south, and a rough area of 52 mkm (Megameter) or 52,441 km.
