= Sidi Abed =

Coordinates: 35°44′43″N 1°42′18″E

- Commune and town
- Interactive map of Sidi Abed
- Country: Algeria
- Province: Tissemsilt Province
- Time zone: UTC+1 (CET)

Sidi Abed is a town and commune in Tissemsilt Province in northern Algeria.
