= Youssoufia, Algeria =

Youssoufia
- Commune and town
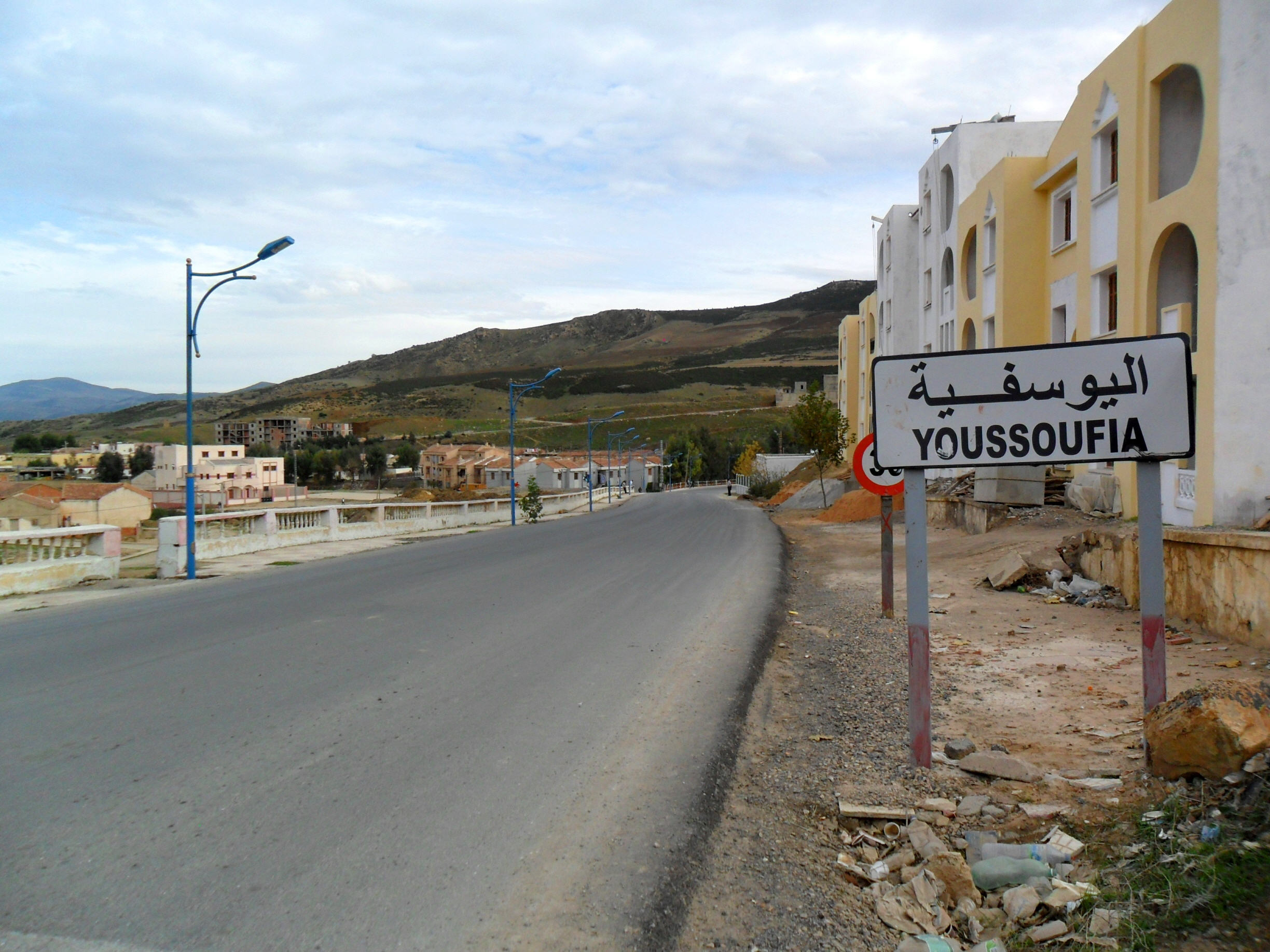

- Location within Algeria
- Coordinates: 35°56′53″N 2°6′46″E
- Country: Algeria
- Province: Tissemsilt Province

Population (2008)
  - Total: 2,254
- Time zone: UTC+1 (CET)

Youssoufia is a town and commune in Tissemsilt Province in northern Algeria.

== History ==
Until 1989, the town of Youssoufia was called Oued Gherga.
