= Lardjem =

Coordinates: 35°44′58″N 1°32′54″E

- Commune and town
- Interactive map of Lardjem
- Country: Algeria
- Province: Tissemsilt Province
- Time zone: UTC+1 (CET)

Lardjem is a town and commune in Tissemsilt Province in northern Algeria.
