= Boucaid =

- Commune and town
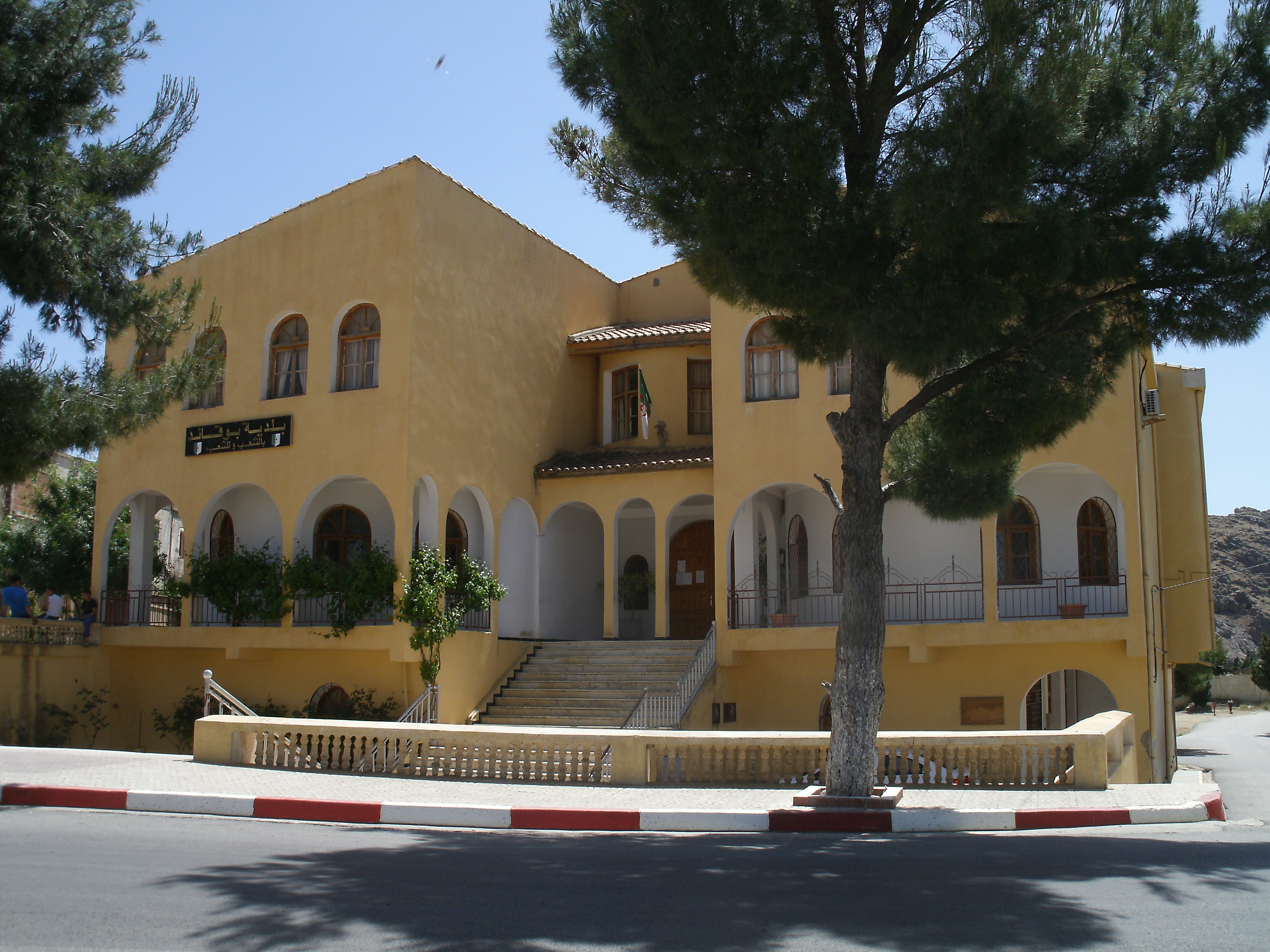

- Location within Algeria
- Coordinates: 35.89026°N 1.61978°E
- Country: Algeria
- Province: Tissemsilt Province
- Time zone: UTC+1 (CET)

Boucaid is a town and commune in Tissemsilt Province in northern Algeria.
