= Tissemsilt =

- city
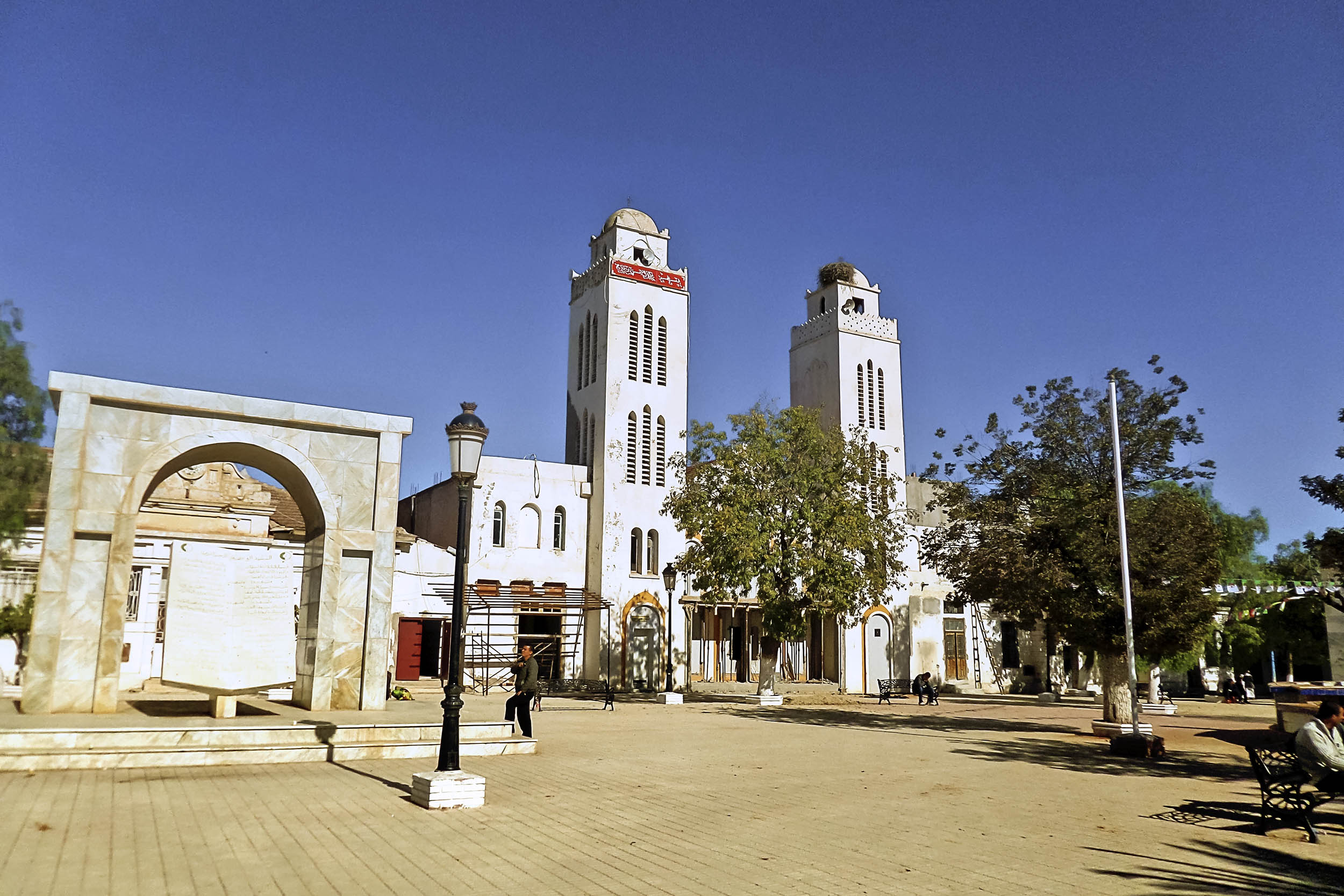

- Location of Tissemsilt within Algeria
- Coordinates: 35°36′28″N 1°48′40″E
- Country: Algeria
- Province: Tissemsilt
- District: Tissemsilt District

Government
  - PMA Seats: 11
- Elevation: 849 m (2,785 ft)

Population (2008 Census)
  - Total: 75,197
- Time zone: UTC+1 (CET)
- Postal code: 38000
- ONS code: 3801
- Climate: Csa

Tissemsilt (Arabic: تسمسيلت, romanized: Tissamsīlt) is a municipality in Algeria. It is the capital of Tissemsilt Province and Tissemsilt District. It has a university by the name of Ahmed Ben Yahia El-Wancharissi.
