= Aflou Province =

Aflou Province ولاية ﺁﻓﻠﻮ ⴰⴳⴻⵣⴷⵓ ⵏ ⴰⴼⵍⵓ
- Province
- Map of Aflou Province
- Coordinates: 34°06′32″N 2°06′07″E
- Country: Algeria
- Created: 2026
- Capital: Aflou

Area
  - Total: 6,600 km^{2} (2,500 sq mi)

Population (2008)
  - Total: 175,843
  - Density: 27/km^{2} (69/sq mi)
- Time zone: UTC+01 (CET)
- Area code: +213
- ISO 3166 code: DZ-03
- Districts: 5
- Municipalities: 12

Aflou Province (Arabic: ولاية ﺁﻓﻠﻮ, romanized: Wilāyat Āflū, Tamazight: ⴰⴳⴻⵣⴷⵓ ⵏ ⴰⴼⵍⵓ, Agezdu n Aflu) is a province (wilaya) in central Algeria, with Aflou as its capital. It was created in 2026 by separation from Laghouat Province.

Aflou Province is located in the Saharan Atlas and covers an area of about 6,600 km². Around 176,000 people lived in the province at the 2008 census, giving it a population density of about 27 inhabitants per square kilometre.

== Administrative divisions ==
The wilaya of Aflou is divided into 12 communes, grouped into 5 districts (daïras).

Daïras	Communes		
Daïras	Name	Pop. 2008	former ONS code
Aflou	Aflou	102,025	0319
Aflou	Sebgag	5,981	0316
Aflou	Sidi Bouzid	5,191	0324
Brida	Brida	6,395	0313
Brida	Hadj Mechri	6,357	0315
Brida	Taouiala	3,172	0317
Gueltat Sidi Saad	Gueltat Sidi Saad	12,567	0310
Gueltat Sidi Saad	Aïn Sidi Ali	10,486	0311
Gueltat Sidi Saad	El Beïdha	8,761	0312
Oued Morra	Oued Morra	5,700	0321
Oued Morra	Oued M’Zi	3,129	0322
El Ghicha	El Ghicha	6,079	0314
