= Tadjmout =

Tadjmout تاجموت
- Commune and town

- Location within Algeria
- Coordinates: 33°48′N 2°18′E
- Country: Algeria
- Province: Laghouat Province
- District: Aïn Madhi
- Established: 1984

Area
  - Total: 621 km^{2} (240 sq mi)
- Elevation: 891 m (2,923 ft)

Population (2008)
  - Total: 24,320
  - Density: 39.2/km^{2} (101/sq mi)
- Time zone: UTC+1 (CET)

Tadjemout is a town and commune in Laghouat Province, Algeria. According to the 1998 census it has a population of 20,321.

Situated on the very edge of the Saharan Desert, the closest countries to it are Morocco and Tunisia. It has an altitude of 891 metres (2,923 ft). Tadjmout is 326 km (203 mi) from Algiers and 465 km (289 mi) from Constantine.

Tadjmout is a town and commune in Laghouat Province, Algeria. According to the 1998 census, it has a population of 20,321.

Tadjmout municipalities in the Laghouat province, located about 48 km (30 mi) in the north-west of the city of Laghouat, bounded on the north Djelfa, and southward El Houaita and El kheneg, and West Ouad M'zi and Aïn Madhi and Sidi Bouzid and baidha, and to the east of Sidi Makhlouf and Laghouat . Considered Tadjmout third agglomeration after the municipality of Laghouat and municipality Aflou, emerged from the administrative division of 1984, and sits on a total area of 620 km^{2} (240 mi^{2}) and was in the old crossing point where they pass through various convoys coming from the south, flying towards the north, and the area stretching towards the border with the Tiaret Province at the border point called area hissian dib, with a population of about 26846 people, where are stationed 81.60% of the total population at the municipal and 6.89% area of the brow of the municipality regionally and administratively and located on the national Road No. 23, while distributed 11.51% between nomads the workers legally residing in the industrial workshops on municipal land . SP5 and several communities, including most notably : the eyebrow, which is the largest gathering outside the headquarters of the municipal population, and also djkaijika and Hadjeb and grab most of the population and deliberately on agriculture and breeding of all types of livestock such as farm Anumeir Tahir inherited from the colonial era .
