= Brida (disambiguation) =

Brida is a town in Algeria.

Brida may also refer to:

- Brida (novel), a 1990 novel by Paulo Coelho
- Brida District, Algeria
- BrIDA scan, cholescintigraphy using BrIDA radiotracer
