= Conquest of the Touat (1583) =

The Conquest of Touat and Gourara in 1583 was a military expedition led by the Saadi Sultan Ahmad al-Mansur to conquer the oases of Touat and Gourara.

== Conquest ==
In 1582, Sultan Ahmad al-Mansur seized the Touat and the Gourara oases.

== See also ==
- Laghouat Expedition (1708–1713)
