= Abdellah Ben Kerriou =

Abdallah Ben Kerriou
- عبد الله بن كريو
- Born: Abdallah Ben Kerriou; 1869; Laghouat, Algeria
- Died: 1921 (aged 51–52)
- Citizenship: Algerian
- Education: Traditional religious scholarship (ʿulūm)
- Occupation: Poet
- Notable work: Gamr Elleïl
- Style: Popular poetry, melhoun, Saharan singing
- Movement: Saharan popular literature

Abdallah Ben Kerriou (in Arabic: عبد الله بن كريو), born around 1869 in Laghouat and died in 1921, was a popular Algerian poet from the central Sahara, renowned for his contribution to the Melhoun repertoire. His work and persona have been the subject of studies, tributes and commemorations in Algeria.

== Biography ==
Abdellah Ben Kerriou was born in Laghouat into a family of scholars; his father is said to have held the position of bachagha. He received a traditional education (in law and religious studies) and acquired a solid general knowledge of astronomy, alchemy and other fields, as attested by modern biographies and studies. Ben Kerriou is known for his love poems addressed to a woman named Fatna, which, according to local tradition and several studies, caused family tensions and led to his internal exile to El-Goléa in 1899. His verses, initially transmitted orally, quickly circulated throughout the central Sahara and the Hauts-Plateaux.

== Works and style ==
Abdallah Ben Kerriou belongs to the poetic-musical tradition of southern Algeria (Saharan song or melhoun), where poetry is closely linked to song and popular music. His recurring themes are courtly/platonic love, nostalgia, exile and descriptions of Saharan landscapes. The poem Gamr Elleïl (The Full Moon) is one of the most famous texts attributed to Ben Kerriou and was later popularised by singers such as Khelifi Ahmed and other performers of the Saharan repertoire. Several modern collections and anthologies have published and translated his poems, including bilingual editions and critical studies that place Ben Kerriou in the history of Algerian popular poetry.

== Transmission and adaptations ==
Ben Kerriou's poems have survived throughout the 20th century thanks to oral tradition and recordings: singers and troupes from Laghouat and the Sahara (Bachir Sarout, Hmida Belhadef, Youcef Bourezgue, Khelifi Ahmed) have set his verses to music, helping to spread them throughout the Maghreb and the Arab world. Early recordings (from the early 20th century) and contemporary interpretations attest to the vitality of the repertoire.

== Tributes and commemorations ==
National and local commemorations were organised to honour Abdallah Ben Kerriou, particularly on the centenary of his death: the National Library of Algeria dedicated a day to paying tribute to the poet, and cultural events were held in Laghouat (cultural centre, Al-Takhi Abdallah Ben Kerriou association, exhibitions, shows)

== Studies and bibliography ==
Boualem Bessaih (ed.). Abdallah Ben Kerriou : poète de Laghouat et du Sahara, bilingual edition, Publisud / Casbah, 2003 (modern edition). ·
