= Bouzid =

Bouzid is a name, primarily used in the Maghreb. It can be both a given name and a surname. Notable people with the name include:

- Bouzid Mahyouz (born 1952), Algerian footballer
- Adam Bouzid (born 1987), French-Algerian footballer
- Ismaël Bouzid (born 1983), Algerian footballer
- Lakdar Bouzid (born 1936), Tunisian modern pentathlete
- Leyla Bouzid (born 1984), Tunisian screenwriter and film director
- Nouri Bouzid (born 1945), Tunisian film director and screenwriter
- Wissem Bouzid (born 2002), Algerian footballer

== See also ==
- Sidi Bouzid, Tunisian city
- Sidi Bouzid, Algeria, town and commune in Laghouat Province
