= Laghouat Expedition (1708–1713) =

1708–1713 military expedition

- Part of Conflicts between the Regency of Algiers and Morocco
Date	1708–1713
Location	Laghouat and other oases in the Algerian desert
Result	The oases around Laghouat became temporarily tributaries to the Sultanate of Morocco

Belligerents
Morocco	Laghouat; Beni M'zab other tribes

Commanders and leaders
Ismail Ibn Sharif; Moulay Abdelmalek	

The Laghouat Expedition were a series of raids led by Morocco, under the reign of Ismail Ibn Sharif from 1708 to 1713.

== Background ==
In the seventeenth century, these oases were already the target of the Alaouite Emir of Tafilalt - before this dynasty took the place of the Saadians on the throne – and were tributaries for a short period of time.

== Chronology ==
In 1708, the son of Sultan Moulay Ismail, a man named Moulay Abdelmalek launched an expedition to impose a tribute on Laghouat and Aïn Madhi. It is based on the previous conquest of the Alaouite Emir Sidi Mohammed who from the time when Yusuf Bacha was the Pasha of the Regency of Algiers (1647–1650) had carried out raids on Tlemcen, Oujda, Aïn Madhi and Laghouat to claim tribute . The inhabitants of Laghouat then pay tribute only in a forced and temporary way.

This Saharan Expedition of 1708 took place after a reorganization of the Moroccan army following its defeat in the Battle of Chelif against the dey of Algiers in 1701 as counterattack after the Mascara campaign. The son of Moulay Ismail, Abdelmalek, who led the troops established his camp at Aïn Madhi and from there sent troops to collect a tax. One of these troops would have reached Ouargla, but couldn't do anything against Biskra where a garrison of the Beylik of Constantine was present. These expeditions in Algerian territory seem lucrative enough for them to be attempted again between 1710 and 1713 in the direction of Laghouat and Aïn Sefra by more or less controlled elements of the Moroccan army including probably one of Moulay Ismail's nephews who established themselves in Boussemghoun.

== Loss of the cities ==
These territories were far from the Moroccan homeland, and thus Moroccan control was often loose, and nominal at best. In 1727, following the death of Ismail, a rebellion broke out in Laghouat, which was pacified by an expedition from the Beylik of Titteri (a governorate of Algiers) which removed Moroccan control over the area, and instead established control from Algiers in the region. Laghouat, and other Saharan territories previously under Moroccan control became tributaries of the Bey of Titteri. From then on until the end of the 18th century the region remained under the Regency of Algiers with further expeditions undertaken by the Bey of Medea and the Bey of Oran.
