= Fatima Amaria =

1993 film by Nadia Cherabi and Male Lagguone

Fatima Amaria also known as Fatima el Amaria is a documentary of a young Muslim girl in Algeria, who loved to sing.

== Production ==
Fatima Amaria was directed by Nadia Cherabi and Male Lagguone in 1993, produced by CAAIC, Algiers.

== Plot ==
Young Amaria is a member of a religious community in a village in Southern Algeria. The women there live alone most of the time. since the men work far away in the oil fields. Amaria dreams of becoming a famous singer. She sings in several music groups whose styles range from Religious music (religious songs) to rai and reggae by Bob Marley. When she travels to the city to do a recording, she exchanges her fullbody-Hijab for a Scarf. .
