= Taouila =

Coordinates: 33°52′07″N 1°51′38″E

Taouiala تاويالة
- Commune and town
- Country: Algeria
- Province: Laghouat Province
- District: Brida

Area
  - Total: 98 sq mi (255 km^{2})

Population (2008)
  - Total: 3,172
  - Density: 32.2/sq mi (12.4/km^{2})
- Time zone: UTC+1 (CET)

Taouila is a town and commune in Laghouat Province, Algeria. According to the 1998 census, it has a population of 2,634.
