= Laghouat District =

Laghouat District دائرة الأغواط
- District

- Location within Algeria
- Coordinates: 33°48′24″N 2°52′56″E
- Country: Algeria
- Province: Laghouat Province
- District seat: Laghouat

Area
  - Total: 150 sq mi (400 km^{2})
- Elevation: 2,467 ft (752 m)

Population (2008)
  - Total: 144,747
  - Density: 940/sq mi (360/km^{2})
- Time zone: UTC+1 (CET)
- Area code: +213 29

Laghouat District is a district of Laghouat Province, Algeria. Laghouat (Laghwat) is an Algerian town, About 400 km from Algiers.

Laghouat, town and oasis, north-central Algeria. It is located where the northern fringe of the Sahara meets the southern edge of the Saharan Atlas Mountains, on the route linking Algiers with central Africa. The oasis (625 acres [253 hectares]) was probably settled in the 11th century after the Banū Hilāl invaders, supported by the Fāṭimids of Egypt, crossed the area. Laghouat subsequently passed through Moroccan and Turkish hands and was divided by two warring groups representing the Ouled Serrine and Hallaf peoples. The oasis, taken and united by the French in 1852, reverted to Algeria in 1962. It is one of four major population centres in the region; the others are the seminomads’ market town of Aflou and the Mʾzab and el-Golea oases groups.

Laghouat lies on the Wadi Mzi (Wadi Djedi in its lower course), built on two hills that are northward extensions of Mount Tizigarine. The modern quarter, on the southern hill, contains the administrative and military installations. The old section, on the northern hill, retains its Saharan-style architecture and is the location of the cathedral of the bishop of the Sahara. Three dams on the Wadi Mzi irrigate date palms, fruit trees, vegetables, and cereals. Laghouat is known for its woven wall hangings and knotted woolen carpets. Pop. (1998) 96,342; (2008) 134,373.

== Municipalities ==
The district is further divided into 1 municipalities:

- Laghouat

== Distances ==
410 Kilometers North (N) the capital of the country: Algiers

110 Kilometers North (N) Djelfa Town

130 Kilometers Northwest (NW) Bou Saâda Town

200 Kilometers South (S) Ghardaia Village
