= Ksar El Hirane =

Coordinates: 33°47′N 3°09′E

Ksar El Hirane قصر الحيران
- Commune and town
- Map of Laghouat Province highlighting Ksar El Hirane
- Country: Algeria
- Province: Laghouat Province
- District: Ksar El Hirane

Area
  - Total: 480 sq mi (1,240 km^{2})

Population (2008)
  - Total: 23,841
  - Density: 49.8/sq mi (19.2/km^{2})
- Time zone: UTC+1 (CET)

Ksar El Hirane is a town and commune in Laghouat Province, Algeria. According to the 1998 census it has a population of 14,910.
