= Ksar El Hirane District =

Coordinates: 33.788564°N 3.140717°E

Ksar El Hirane District دائرة قصر الحيران
- District
- Map of Algeria highlighting Laghouat Province

- Map of Laghouat Province highlighting Ksar El Hirane District
- Country: Algeria
- Province: Laghouat
- District seat: Ksar El Hirane

Area
  - Total: 2,700 km^{2} (1,000 sq mi)

Population (2008)
  - Total: 33,462
  - Density: 12/km^{2} (32/sq mi)
- Time zone: UTC+01 (CET)
- Municipalities: 2

Ksar El Hirane is a district located in Laghouat Province, Algeria. The district is named after its capital, Ksar El Hirane. This area is part of the larger administrative division of Laghouat Province, which is known for its diverse landscapes and rich cultural heritage.

== Geography ==
Ksar El Hirane District is situated in the central part of Algeria, within the Saharan region. The district features a mix of arid and semi-arid landscapes, characterized by its desert terrain and occasional oases. The climate is typically hot and dry, with significant temperature fluctuations between day and night.

== Municipalities ==
The district is divided into two municipalities:

1. Ksar El Hirane: The administrative center and the largest municipality within the district. Ksar El Hirane serves as a central hub for the district's activities and services.
2. Bennasser Benchohra: A smaller municipality within the district, named after a local historical figure or prominent leader.

== History ==
Ksar El Hirane, along with the broader Laghouat Province, has a rich history influenced by various cultures and historical periods. Historically, this region was part of the trans-Saharan trade routes and has been a site of various historical interactions between African and Mediterranean cultures.

== Economy ==
The economy of Ksar El Hirane District primarily revolves around agriculture, particularly in the areas where irrigation is possible. The region's economy is supported by traditional practices such as date palm cultivation and small-scale farming. Additionally, the district's location and historical significance contribute to its role in local trade.

== Culture ==
The cultural life of Ksar El Hirane is deeply influenced by the traditions of the Saharan and Berber communities. Festivals, traditional music, and local crafts play an important role in the cultural identity of the residents. Traditional Algerian practices, including communal gatherings and local artisan work, are central to the social fabric of the district.

== Notable Features ==
- Historical Sites: Ksar El Hirane District features various historical sites and traditional architecture that reflect its past.
- Natural Attractions: The district's desert landscape and natural scenery offer unique opportunities for exploration and tourism, particularly for those interested in desert ecosystems and traditional lifestyles.

== See also ==
- Laghouat Province
- List of Municipalities in Laghouat Province
- Algeria's Saharan Regions
