= Tadjrouna =

Coordinates: 33°30′15″N 2°06′07″E

Tadjrouna تَجرونَ (none)
- Commune and town
- Tadjrouna Commune
- Country: Algeria
- Province: Laghouat Province
- District: Aïn Madhi

Population (2008)
  - Total: 4,306
- Time zone: UTC+1 (CET)

According to Wikipedia. Tadjrouna is a town and commune in Laghouat Province, Algeria. According to the 1998 census, it has a population of 3,597.
