= Sidi Makhlouf District =

Coordinates: 34°08′N 3°01′E

Sidi Makhlouf District دائرة سيدي مخلوف
- District
- Map of Algeria highlighting Laghouat Province

- Map of Laghouat Province highlighting Sidi Makhlouf District
- Country: Algeria
- Province: Laghouat
- District seat: Sidi Makhlouf

Area
  - Total: 1,840 km^{2} (710 sq mi)

Population (2008)
  - Total: 17,910
  - Density: 9.73/km^{2} (25.2/sq mi)
- Time zone: UTC+01 (CET)
- Municipalities: 2

Sidi Makhlouf is a district in Laghouat Province, Algeria. It was named after its capital, Sidi Makhlouf.

== Municipalities ==
The district is further divided into 2 municipalities:

- Sidi Makhlouf
- El Assafia
