= Aïn Madhi District =

Coordinates: 33.7939°N 2.3011°E

Aïn Mahdi District دائرة عين ماضي
- District
- Map of Algeria highlighting Laghouat Province

- Map of Laghouat Province highlighting Aïn Mahdi District
- Country: Algeria
- Province: Laghouat
- District seat: Aïn Madhi

Area
  - Total: 7,820 km^{2} (3,020 sq mi)

Population (2008)
  - Total: 50,303
  - Density: 6.43/km^{2} (16.7/sq mi)
- Time zone: UTC+01 (CET)
- Municipalities: 5

Aïn Madhi is a district in Laghouat Province, Algeria. It was named after its capital, Aïn Madhi.

== Municipalities ==
The district is further divided into 5 municipalities, the highest number in the province:

- Aïn Madhi
- Tadjmout
- Tadjrouna
- El Houaita
- Kheneg
