= Nadia Labidi =

Algerian filmmaker

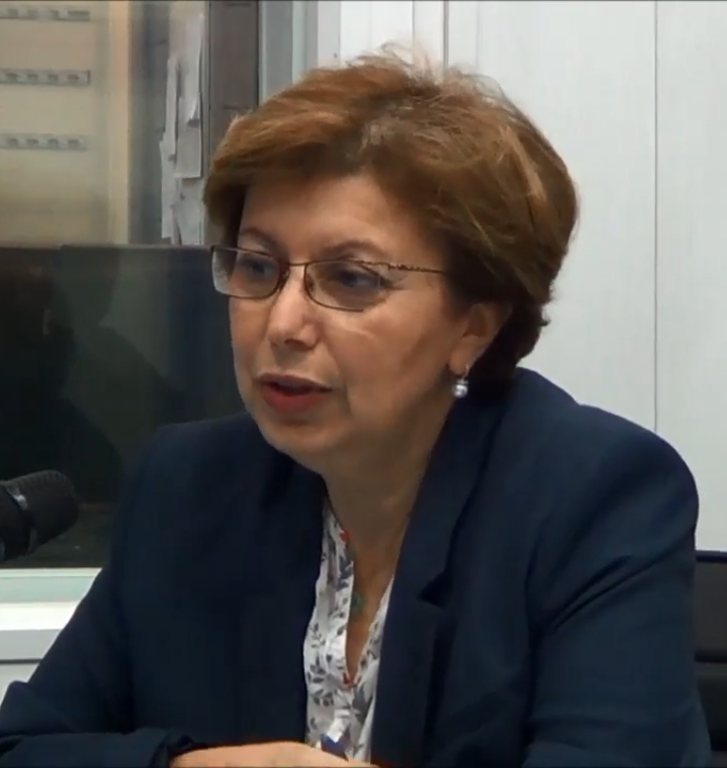
- Labidi in 2014
- Born: Nadia Cherabi; 18 July 1954 (age 72); Aïn Madhi, Algeria
- Education: University of Algiers, Sorbonne (Cinematography, 1987).
- Occupations: Film producer and director, and politician
- Notable work: Fatima Amaria, The Other side of the Mirror

Nadia Labidi (née Cherabi, Arabic: نادية لعبيدي; born 18 July 1954) is an Algerian film producer, film director, and politician. She was Minister of Culture from 5 May 2014 to May 2015. Her filmmaking is "French based and French funded". Her first documentary film was Fatima Amaria in 1993 and her first feature film was The Other side of the Mirror in 2007.

== Early years and education ==
Labidi was born in Aïn Madhi in 1954. She studied sociology at the University of Algiers and received a Ph.D. at the Sorbonne (Cinematography, 1987).

== Career ==
From 1978 until 1994, Labidi worked at the Algerian Centre for Art and the Film Industry Centre Algérien pour l'Art et l'Industrie Cinématographiques (CAAIC) as director of production. She was also a professor at the Faculty of Information Sciences and Communication of the University Algiers III before she became Minister of Culture in the Government of Algeria on 6 May 2014.

In 1991, Labidi served as assistant director at the Algerian newsreel organization, Agence Nationale des Actualités Filmées (ANAF). At CAAIC, she transferred her attention from production to film-making with a particular interest in docudrama. She directed L'exile de Bougie (The Exile of Bougie; 1997) and Fatima Amaria (with Malek Laggoune, 1993).

Labidi founded the production company Procom International in 1994. For many years, Procom International was dedicated exclusively to documentaries and ensured the production of thirty programs for Algerian television. In 2002, the company expanded into fiction and feature films (shot in 35mm), which were co-produced with Algerian television (ENTV) and with the support of the Ministry of Culture.

Fatima Amaria, made in 1993, was Labidi's first documentary film, looks at the life of a young woman in a religious community in southern Algeria; the women involved had never been filmed before, so Labidi felt it was important to win their trust before filming.

Her debut feature film as director was The Other side of the Mirror (L'envers du miroir, 2007). She was also involved with Procom in the production of two other feature films: Women Alive (Vivantes!/A'ichhate, 2006) with well-known director Saïd Ould Khelifa and Wounded Palms (Les palmiers blesses, 2010) with the Tunisian director Abdllatif ben Ammar.

== Filmography ==
- 1993, Fatima Amaria
- 2007, The Other Side of the Mirror
- 2008, Women Alive! / Vivantes! / A'ichate (producer)
- 2010, Wounded Palms / Les palmiers blesses (producer)

== Bibliography ==
- Armes, Roy (29 January 2015). New Voices in Arab Cinema. Indiana University Press. ISBN 978-0-253-01528-0.
- Hillauer, Rebecca (2005). Encyclopedia of Arab Women Filmmakers. American University in Cairo Press. ISBN 978-977-424-943-3.
