= Hadj Mechri =

Coordinates: 33.95715°N 1.59879°E

Hadj Mechri حاج مشري
- Commune and town
- Country: Algeria
- Province: Laghouat Province
- District: Brida

Area
  - Total: 145 sq mi (375 km^{2})

Population (2008)
  - Total: 6,357
  - Density: 43.9/sq mi (17.0/km^{2})
- Time zone: UTC+1 (CET)

Hadj Mechri is a town and commune in Laghouat Province, Algeria. According to the 1998 census it has a population of 6,197.
