= Sebgag =

Sebgag سبقاق
- Commune and town

- Location within Algeria
- Coordinates: 34.02958°N 1.92798°E
- Country: Algeria
- Province: Laghouat Province
- District: Aflou

Area
  - Total: 149 sq mi (385 km^{2})

Population (2008)
  - Total: 5,981
- Time zone: UTC+1 (CET)

Sebgag is a town and commune in Laghouat Province, Algeria. According to the 1998 census it has a population of 6,107.
