= Mekhareg =

- Commune and town
- Country: Algeria
- Province: Laghouat Province
- Time zone: UTC+1 (CET)

Mekhareg is a town and commune in Laghouat Province, Algeria.

N.B. The Actual Name is "BENACER BENCHOHRA", after a personne [1804 Laghouat (Algeria) - 1884 Damascus (Syria)], who was one of the brave leaders in the resistance to the French Occupation [1]

The actual name was introduced in November 1987, replacing by an ordinance the ancient one.
