= Beidha (commune and town) =

Coordinates: 34.47475°N 2.17408°E

Beidha بيضاء
- Commune and town
- Country: Algeria
- Province: Laghouat Province
- District: Gueltet Sidi Saâd

Area
  - Total: 300 sq mi (780 km^{2})

Population (2008)
  - Total: 8,761
  - Density: 29/sq mi (11/km^{2})
- Time zone: UTC+1 (CET)

Beidha is a town and commune in Laghouat Province, Algeria.
