= Oued Morra =

Coordinates: 34°10′N 2°19′E

Oued Morra واد مرة
- Commune and town
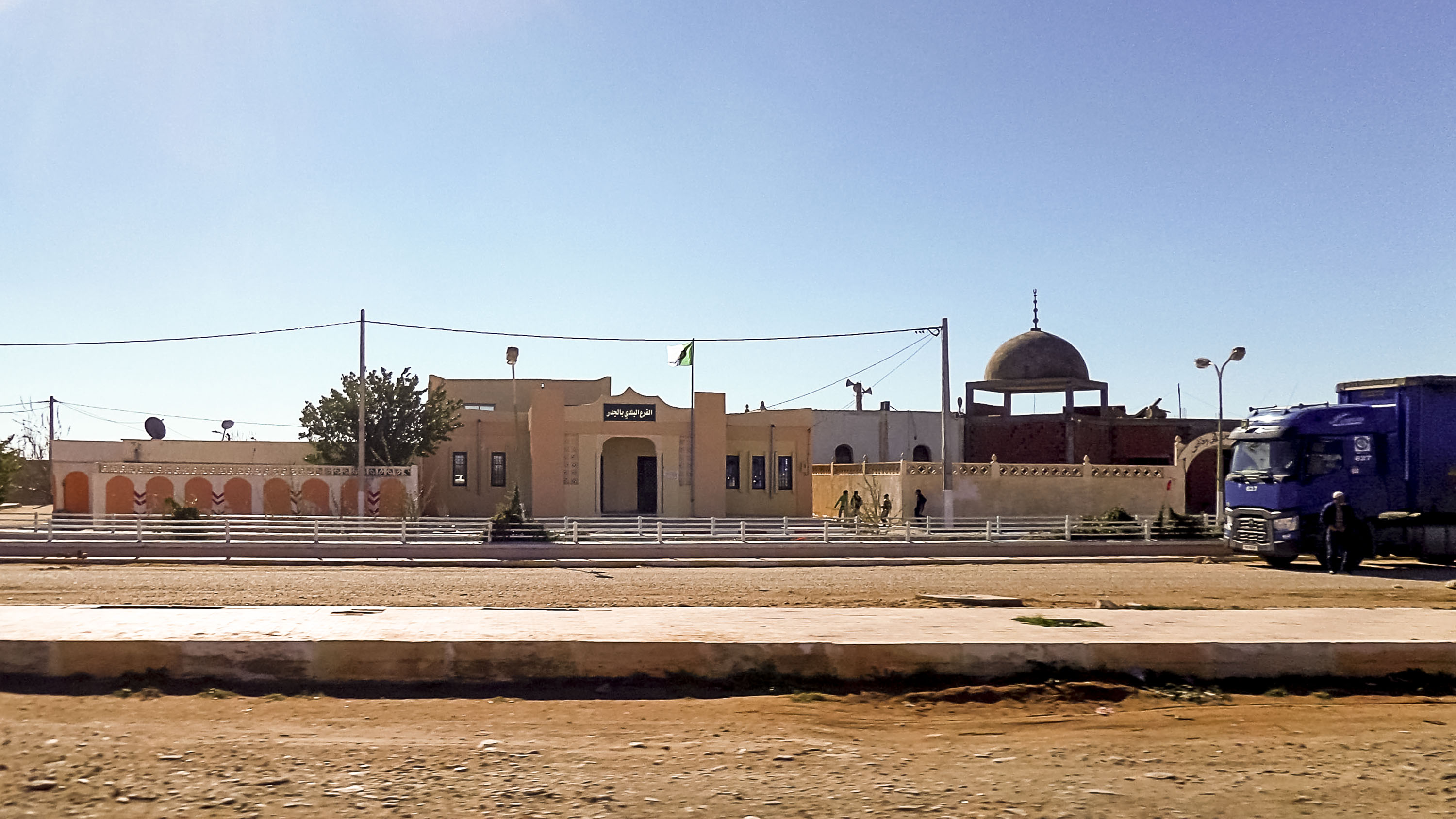

- Map of Laghouat Province highlighting Oued Morra municipality
- Country: Algeria
- Province: Laghouat Province
- District: Oued Morra

Area
  - Total: 140 sq mi (360 km^{2})

Population (2008)
  - Total: 5,700
  - Density: 41/sq mi (16/km^{2})
- Time zone: UTC+1 (CET)

Oued Morra is a town and commune in Laghouat Province, Algeria. According to the 1998 census it has a population of 4,748.
