= El Houaita =

Coordinates: 33°38′43″N 2°26′45″E

- Commune and town
- Country: Algeria
- Province: Laghouat Province
- District: Aïn Madhi

Population (2008)
  - Total: 2,789
- Time zone: UTC+1 (CET)

El Houaita is a town and commune in Laghouat Province, Algeria. According to the 1998 census it has a population of 1,290.
