= El Ghicha =

Coordinates: 33°56′N 2°09′E

El Ghicha الغيشة
- Commune and town
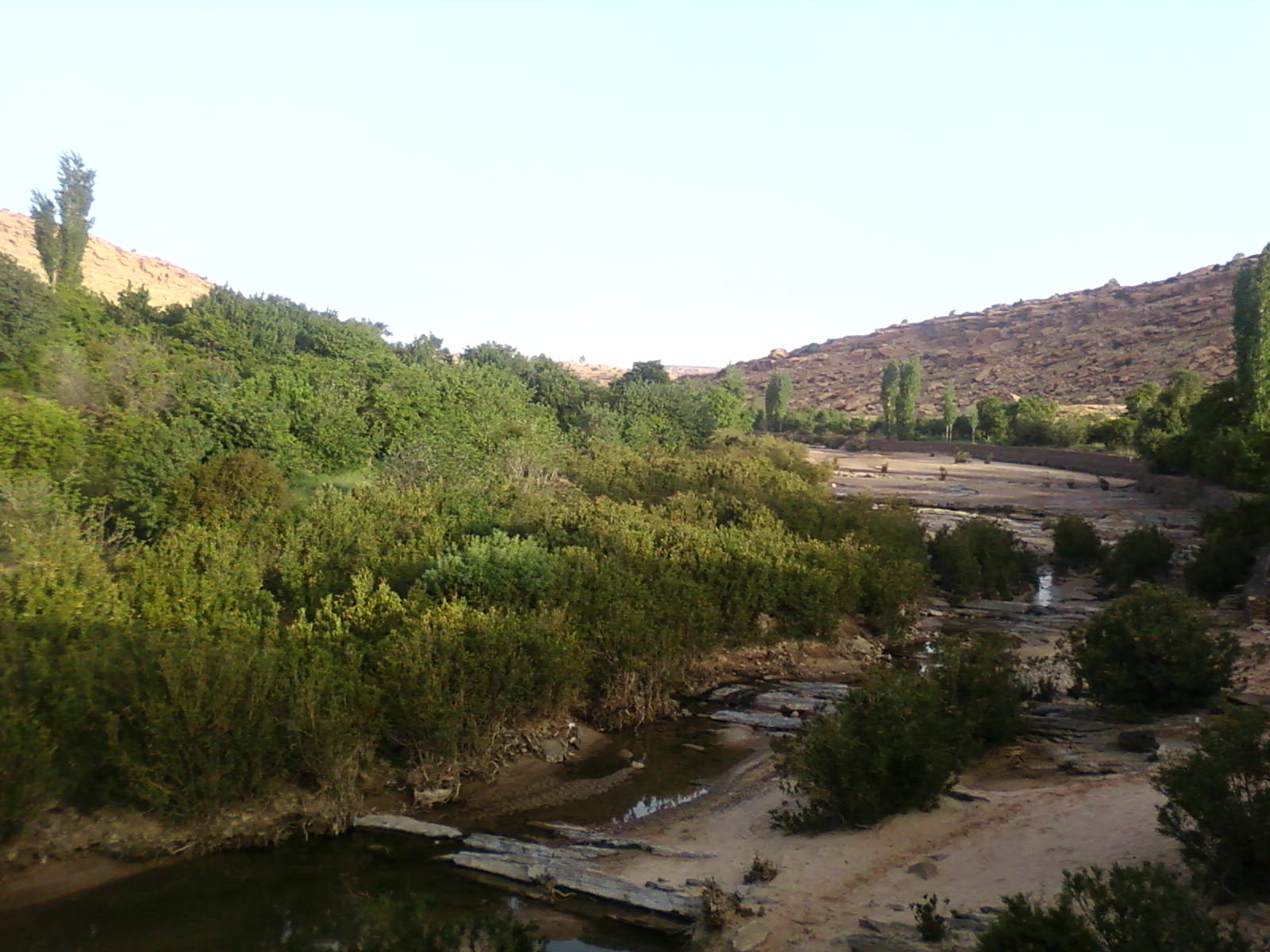
- Oued El Ghicha

- Country: Algeria
- Province: Laghouat Province
- District: El Ghicha

Area
  - Total: 280 sq mi (730 km^{2})

Population (2008)
  - Total: 6,079
  - Density: 22/sq mi (8.3/km^{2})
- Time zone: UTC+1 (CET)
- Postal code: 03510

El Ghicha is a town and commune in Laghouat Province, Algeria. According to the 1998 census, it has a population of 5,719.
