= El Assafia =

Coordinates: 33°50′N 2°59′E

El Assafia العسافية
- Commune and town
- Map of Laghouat Province highlighting El Assafia municipality
- Country: Algeria
- Province: Laghouat Province
- District: Sidi Makhlouf

Area
  - Total: 160 sq mi (420 km^{2})

Population (2008)
  - Total: 5,618
  - Density: 35/sq mi (13/km^{2})
- Time zone: UTC+1 (CET)

El Assafia is a town and commune in Laghouat Province, Algeria. According to the 1998 census, it has a population of 4,389.
