= Gueltet Sidi Saâd District =

Coordinates: 34.297005°N 1.94664°E

Gueltet Sidi Saâd District دائرة قلتة سيدي سعد
- District
- Map of Algeria highlighting Laghouat Province

- Map of Laghouat Province highlighting Gueltet Sidi Saâd District
- Country: Algeria
- Province: Laghouat Province

Area
  - Total: 1,006 sq mi (2,605 km^{2})

Population (2008)
  - Total: 38,171
  - Density: 37.95/sq mi (14.65/km^{2})
- Time zone: UTC+1 (CET)

Gueltet Sidi Saâd District is a district of Laghouat Province, Algeria.

== Municipalities ==
It is divided into 3 municipalities:

- Gueltat Sidi Saad
- Aïn Sidi Ali
- El Beidha.
