= Oued Morra District =

Coordinates: 34°10′N 2°19′E

Oued Morra District دائرة وادي مرة
- District
- Map of Algeria highlighting Laghouat Province

- Map of Laghouat Province highlighting Oued Morra District
- Country: Algeria
- Province: Laghouat
- District seat: Oued Morra

Area
  - Total: 785 km^{2} (303 sq mi)

Population (2008)
  - Total: 8,829
  - Density: 11.2/km^{2} (29.1/sq mi)
- Time zone: UTC+01 (CET)
- Municipalities: 2

Oued Morra is a district in Laghouat Province, Algeria. It was named after its capital, Oued Morra.

== Municipalities ==
The district is further divided into 2 municipalities:

- Oued Morra
- Oued M'Zi
