= Gueltat Sidi Saad =

Coordinates: 34°18′N 1°57′E

Gueltat Sidi Saad قلتة سيدي سعد
- Commune and town
- Country: Algeria
- Province: Laghouat Province
- District: Gueltet Sidi Saâd

Area
  - Total: 400 sq mi (1,040 km^{2})

Population (2008)
  - Total: 12,567
  - Density: 31.3/sq mi (12.1/km^{2})
- Time zone: UTC+1 (CET)

Gueltat Sidi Saad is a town and commune in Laghouat Province, Algeria. According to the 1998 census it has a population of 10,629.
