= Tadjemout =

Coordinates: 33°52′46″N 2°31′24″E

- Commune and town
- Interactive map of Tadjemout
- Country: Algeria
- Province: Laghouat Province

Population (1998)
  - Total: 20,321
- Time zone: UTC+1 (CET)

Tadjemout is a town and commune in Laghouat Province, Algeria. According to the 1998 census it has a population of 20,321.
