= El Ghicha District =

Coordinates: 33°56′N 2°09′E

- District
- Nickname: دائرة الغيشة
- Country: Algeria
- Province: Laghouat Province

Area
  - Total: 280 sq mi (730 km^{2})

Population (2008)
  - Total: 6,079
  - Density: 22/sq mi (8.3/km^{2})
- Time zone: UTC+1 (CET)

El Ghicha District is a district of Laghouat Province, Algeria.

== Municipalities ==
The district is further divided into 1 municipality:

- El Ghicha
