= Aflou District =

Aflou District دائرة أفلو
- District
- Nickname: جبل العمور
- Map of Algeria highlighting Laghouat Province

- Map of Laghouat Province highlighting Aflou District
- Country: Algeria
- Province: Laghouat
- District seat: Aflou

Population (2008)
  - Total: 113,197
- Time zone: UTC+01 (CET)
- Postal code: 03400
- Municipalities: 3

Aflou is a district in Laghouat Province, Algeria. It was named after its capital, Aflou.

== Municipalities ==
The district is further divided into many municipalities:

- Aflou
- Sebgag
- Sidi Bouzid
