= Aïn Sidi Ali =

Coordinates: 34°09′25″N 1°32′30″E

Aïn Sidi Ali عين سيدي علي
- Commune and town
- Country: Algeria
- Province: Laghouat Province
- District: Gueltet Sidi Saâd

Area
  - Total: 160 sq mi (410 km^{2})

Population (2008)
  - Total: 10,486
  - Density: 66/sq mi (26/km^{2})
- Time zone: UTC+1 (CET)

Aïn Sidi Ali is a town and commune in Laghouat Province, Algeria. According to the 1998 census it has a population of 4,220.

== Notable people ==
- Imane Khelif (born 1999), boxer
