= Sidi Makhlouf =

Coordinates: 34°08′N 3°01′E

Sidi Makhlouf سيدي مخلوف
- Commune and town
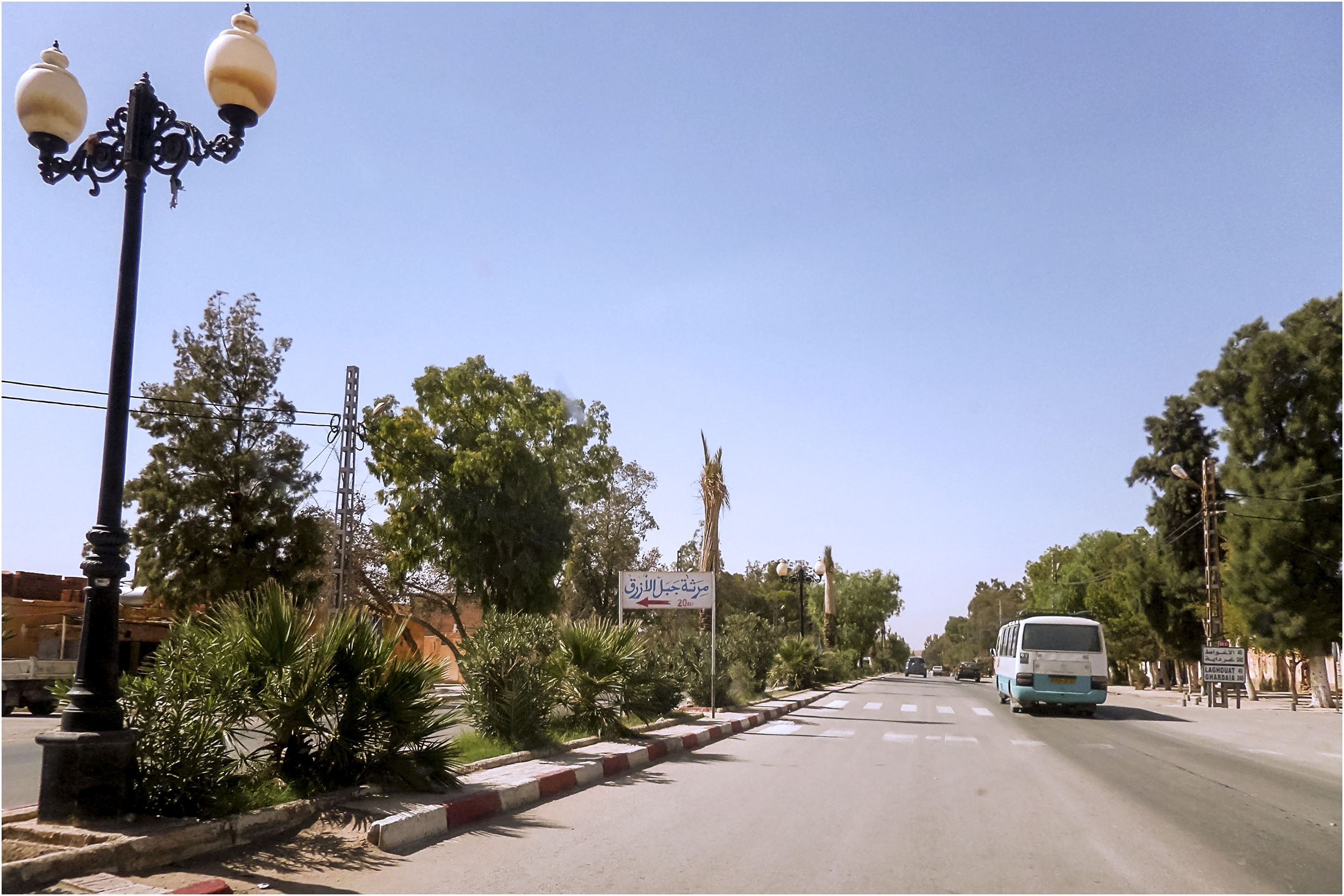

- Map of Laghouat Province highlighting Sidi Makhlouf municipality
- Country: Algeria
- Province: Laghouat Province
- District: Sidi Makhlouf

Area
  - Total: 550 sq mi (1,420 km^{2})

Population (2008)
  - Total: 12,292
  - Density: 22.4/sq mi (8.66/km^{2})
- Time zone: UTC+1 (CET)

Sidi Makhlouf is a town and commune in Laghouat Province, Algeria. According to the 1998 census it has a population of 8,061.

== Tourism ==
Rock carvings Sidi Makhlouf

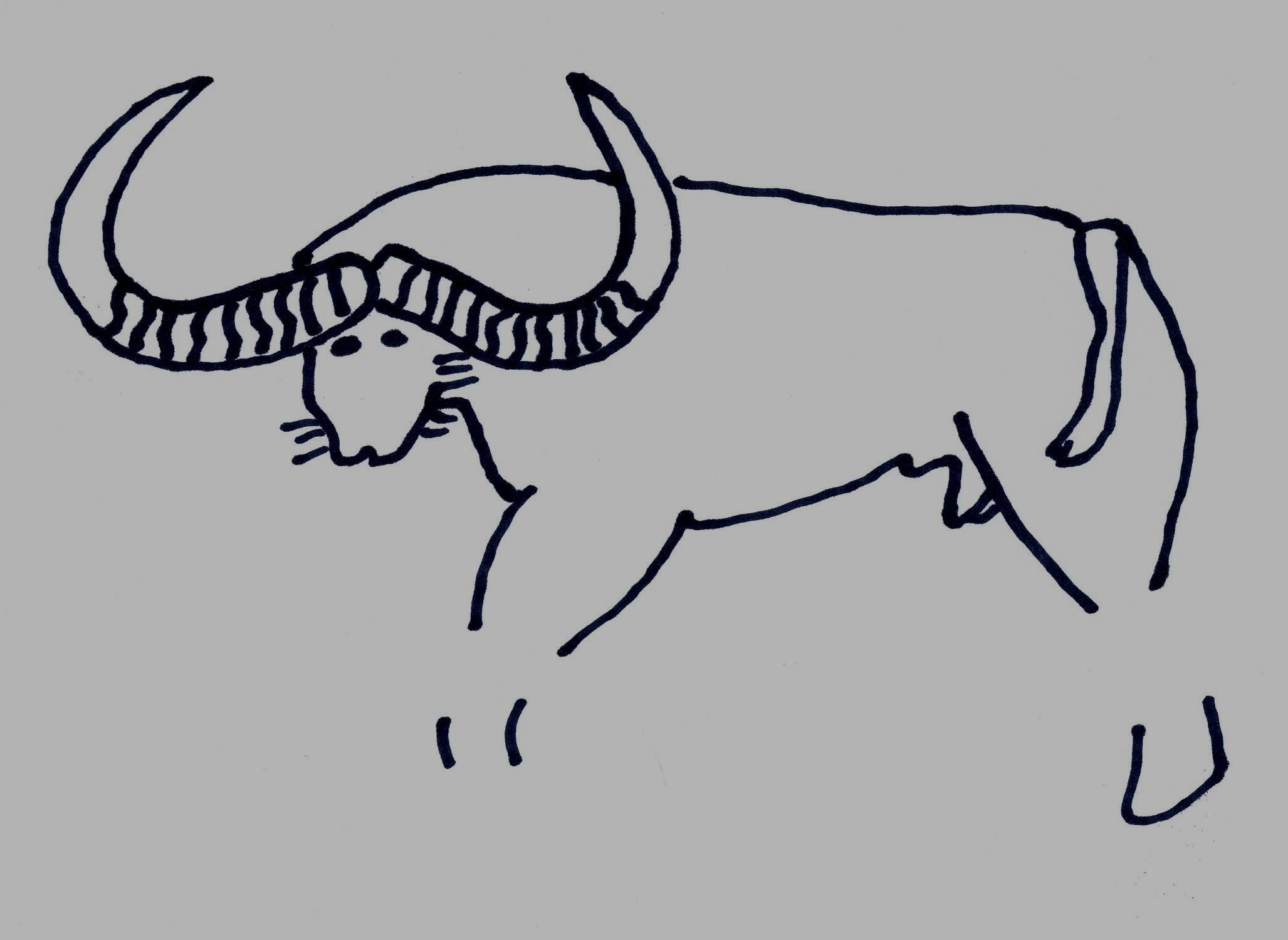

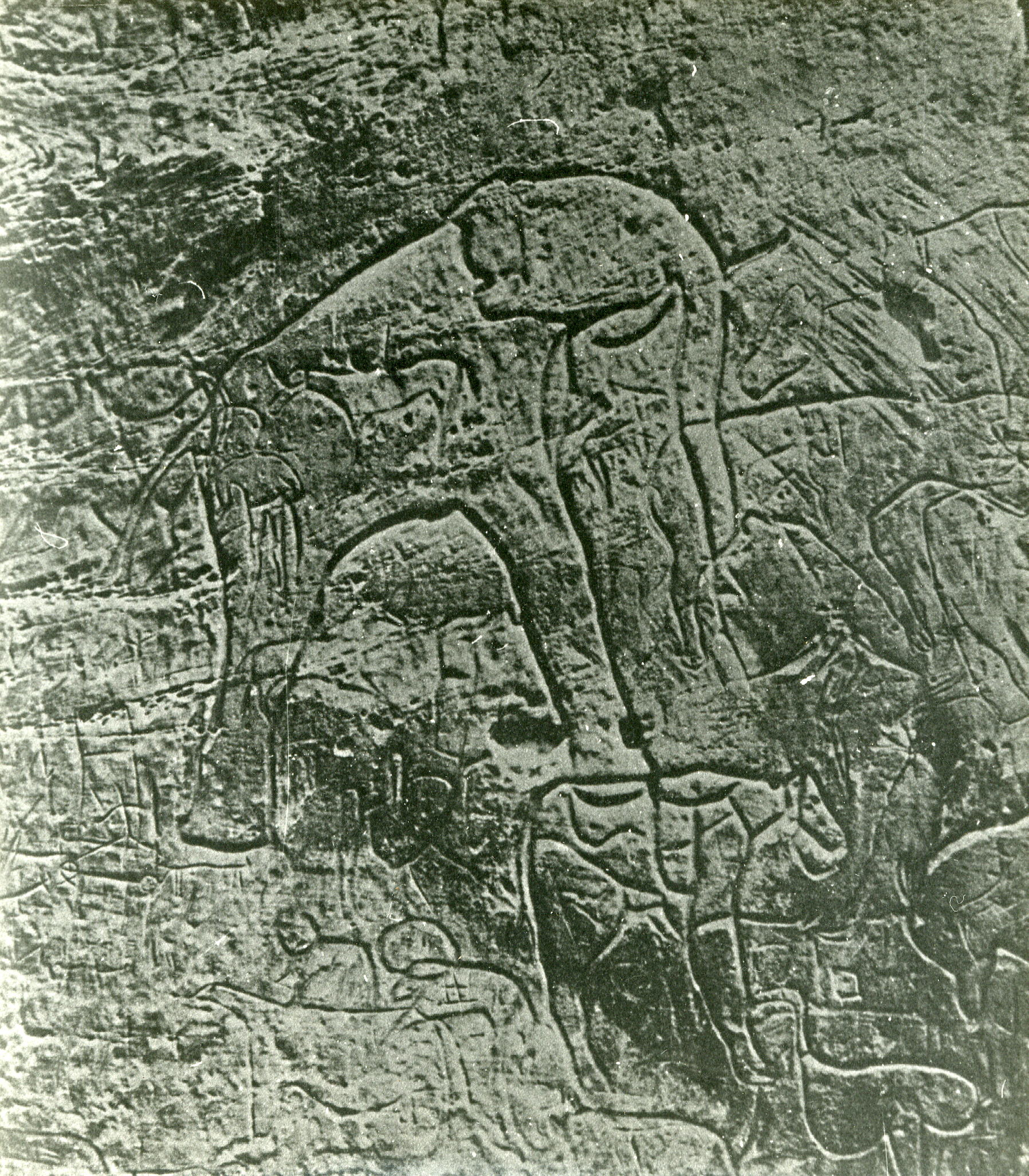
Nature Sidi Makhlouf

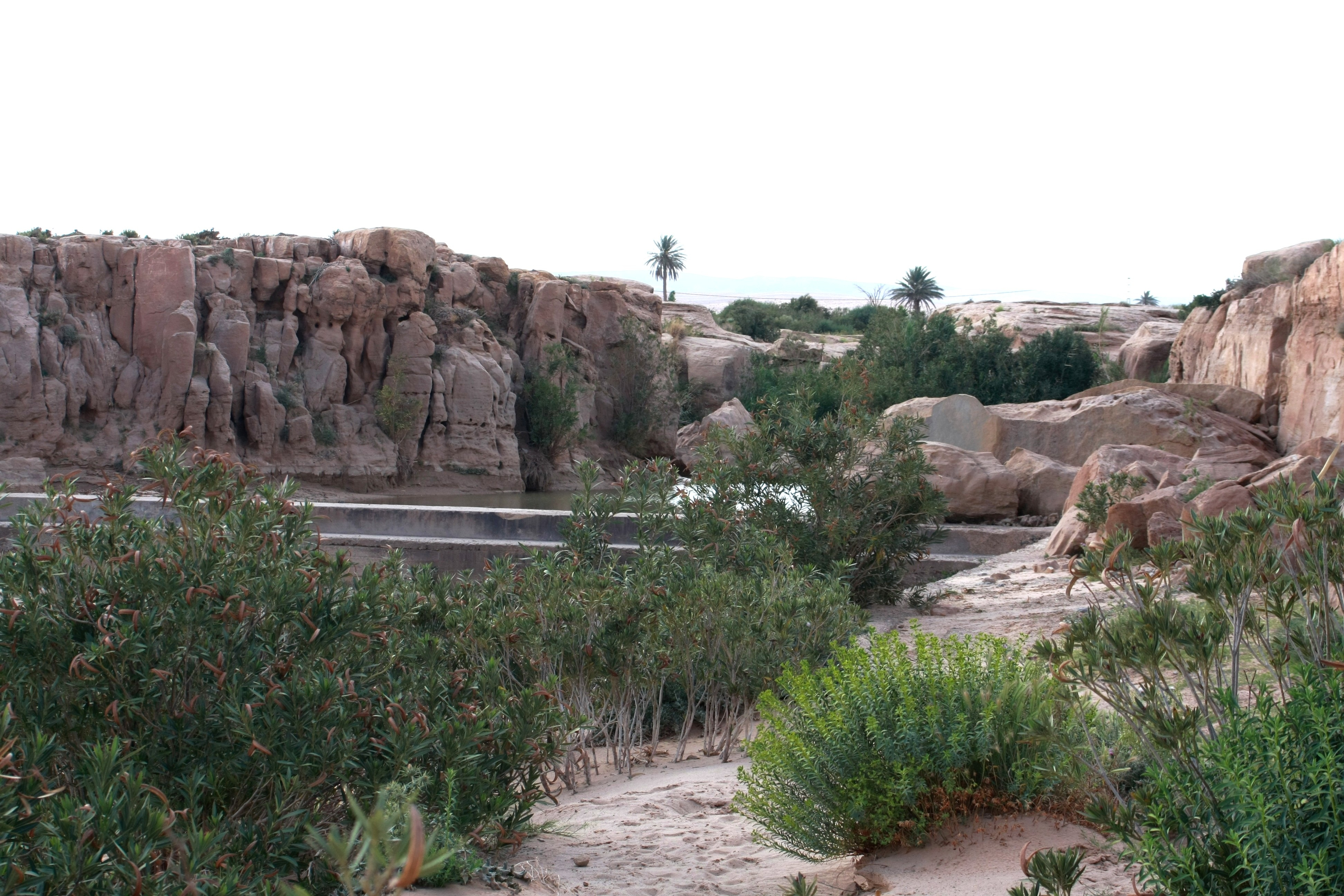

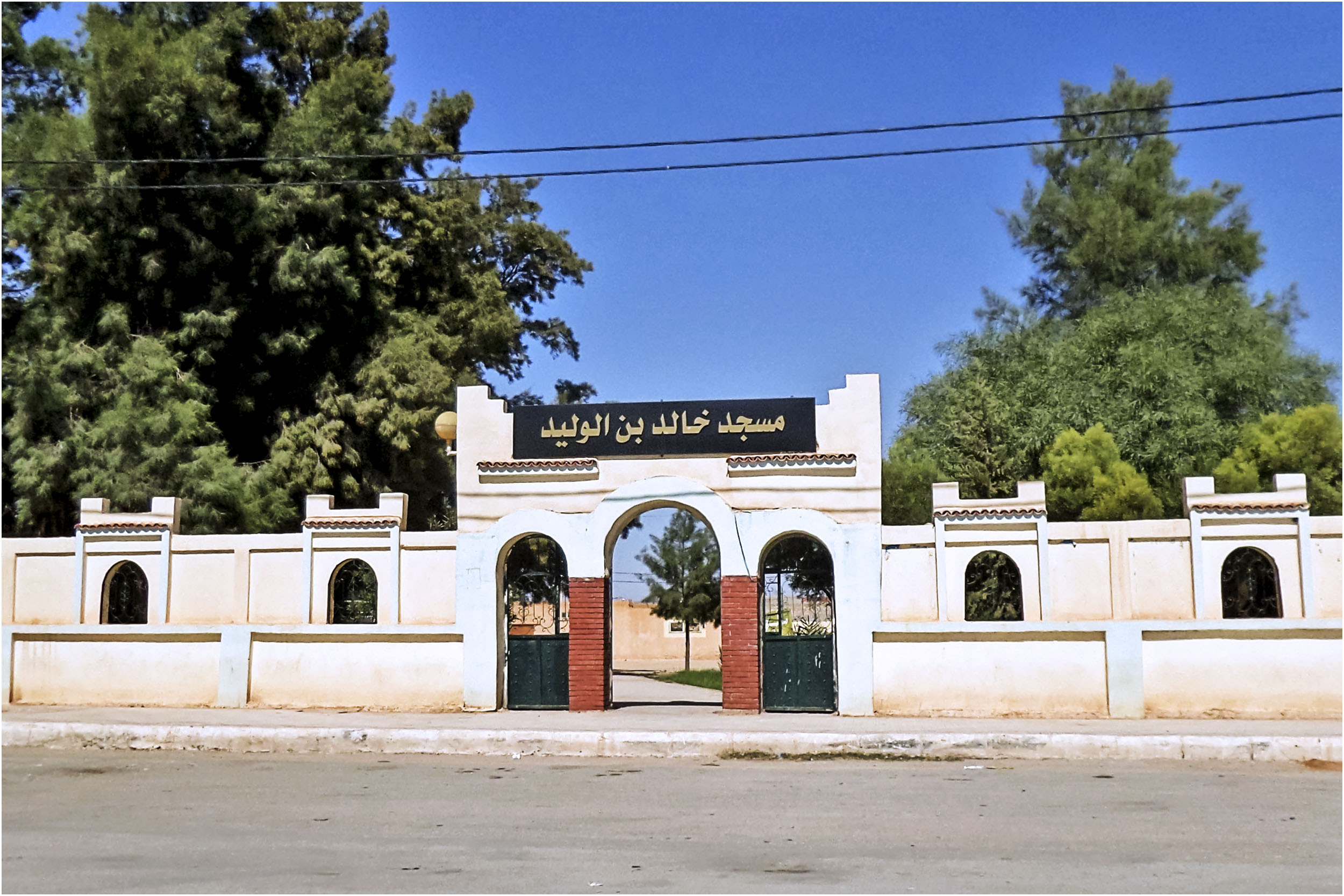
Fantasia Sidi Makhlouf

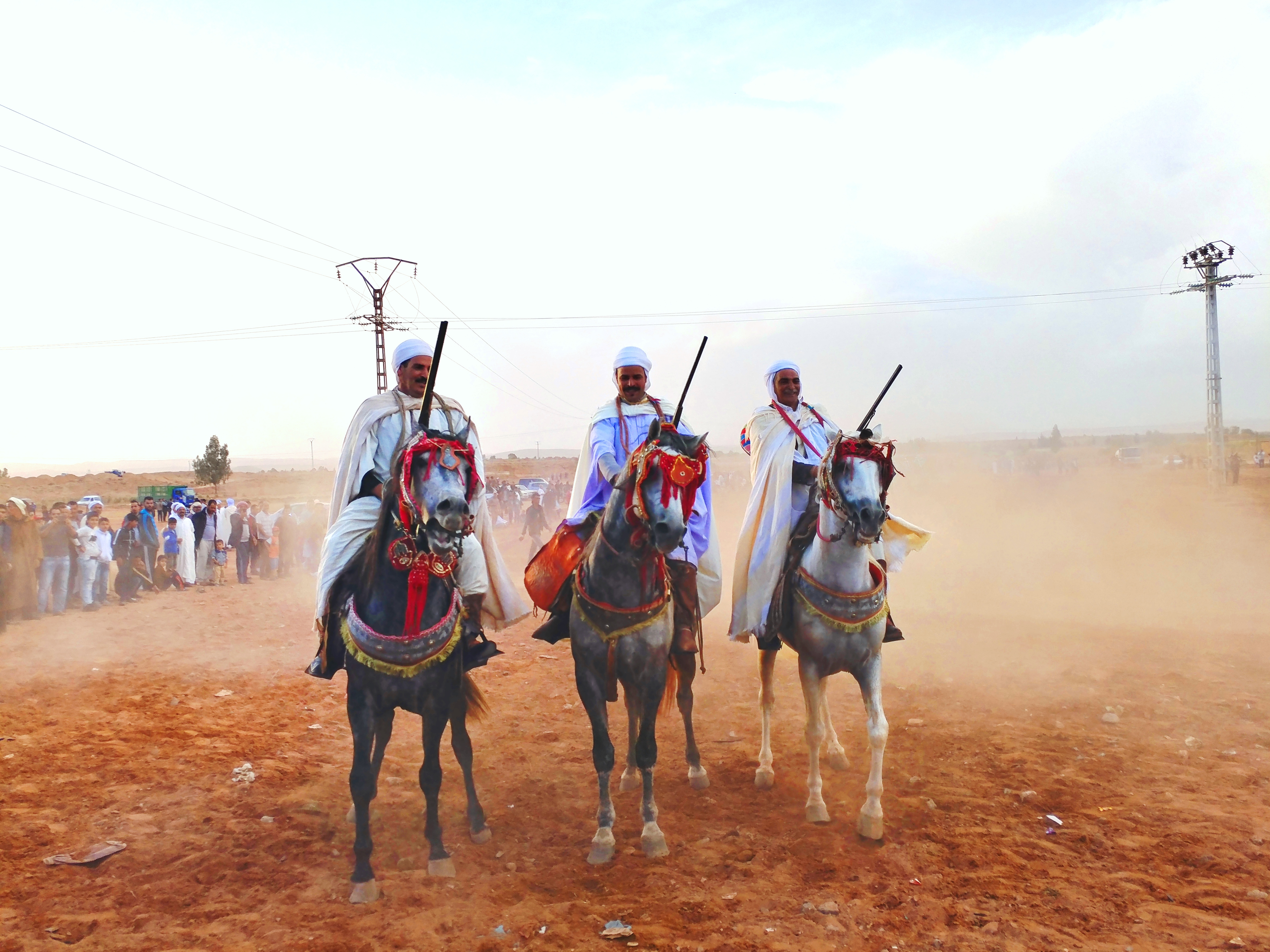

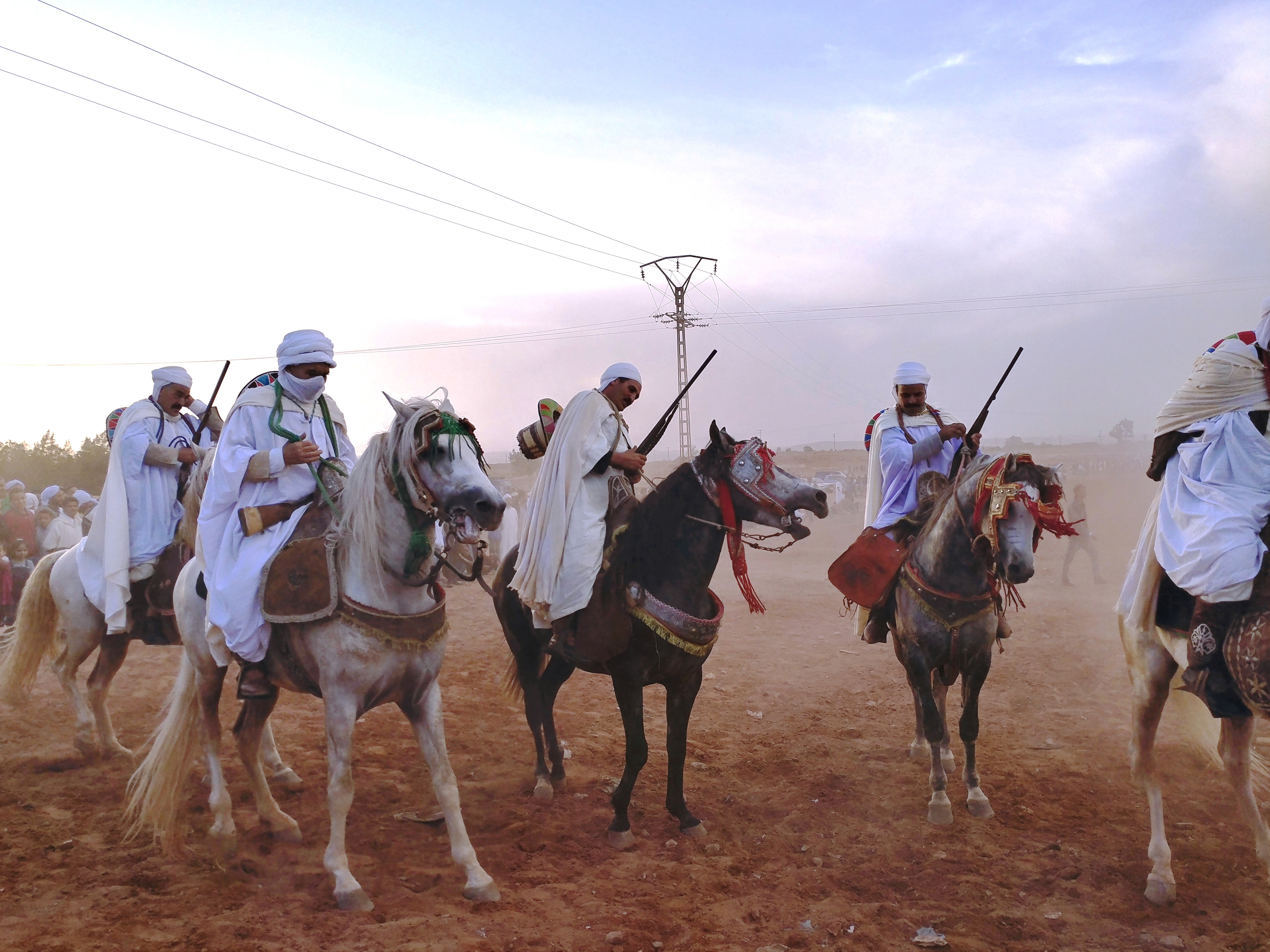
