= Brida District =

Brida District دائرة بريدة
- District
- Map of Algeria highlighting Laghouat Province

- Map of Laghouat Province highlighting Brida District
- Coordinates: 33°58′N 1°44′E
- Country: Algeria
- Province: Laghouat
- District seat: Brida

Population (2008)
  - Total: 15,924
- Time zone: UTC+01 (CET)
- Municipalities: 3

Brida is a district in Laghouat Province, Algeria. It was named after its capital, Brida.

== Municipalities ==
The district is further divided into three municipalities:

- Brida
- Hadj Mechri
- Taouiala. In Taouïala (تاوياله), located in the Amour Range to the southeast of Aflou, there is an ecotouristic village.
