= Kheneg =

Coordinates: 33°44′40″N 2°47′38″E

- Commune and town
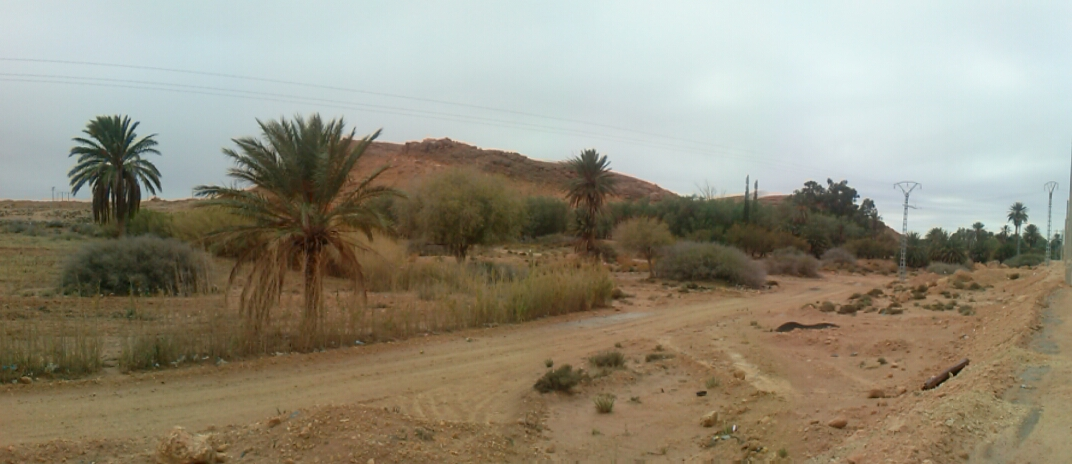

- Country: Algeria
- Province: Laghouat Province
- District: Aïn Madhi

Population (2008)
  - Total: 10,787
- Time zone: UTC+1 (CET)

Kheneg is a town and commune in Laghouat Province, Algeria.
