= Aïn Madhi =

Aïn Madhi عين ماضي
- Commune and town
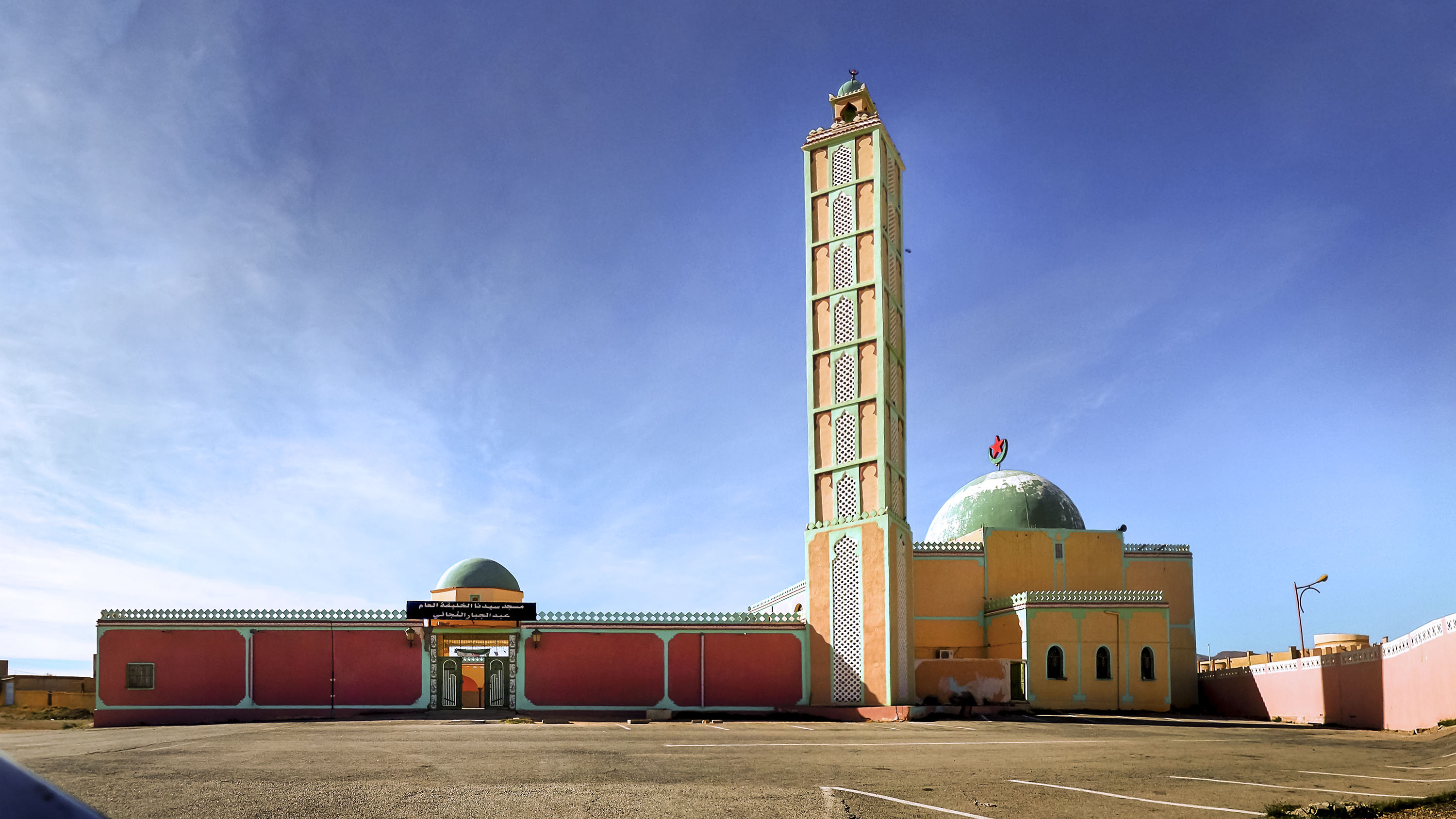
- Mosquee of Aïn Madhi

- Location of Aïn Madhi within Laghouat Province

- Location of Aïn Madhi within Algeria
- Coordinates: 33°48′N 2°18′E
- Country: Algeria
- Province: Laghouat Province
- District: Aïn Madhi

Population (2008)
  - Total: 8,101
- Time zone: UTC+1 (CET)

Aïn Madhi is a town and commune in Laghouat Province, Algeria, and the seat of Aïn Madhi District. According to the 1998 census it has a population of 6,263.

Aïn Madhi is the birthplace of Ahmad al-Tijani, founder of the Tijaniyyah Sufi order and film director and politician Nadia Labidi.

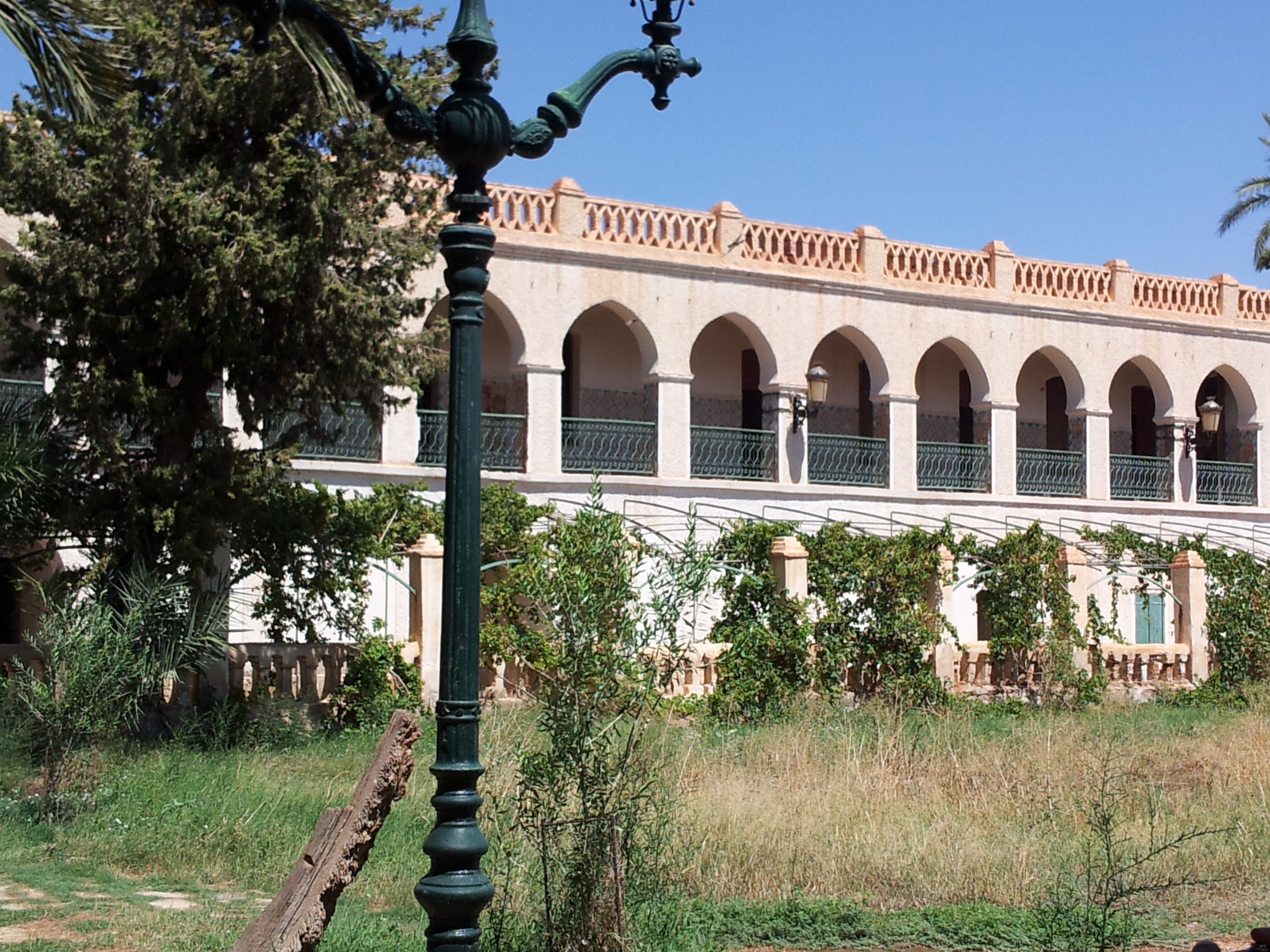
Kourdane Palace
