= Oued M'Zi =

Coordinates: 33.92422°N 2.43695°E

Oued M'Zi واد مزي
- Commune and town
- Map of Laghouat Province highlighting Oued M'Zi municipality
- Country: Algeria
- Province: Laghouat Province
- District: Oued Morra

Area
  - Total: 164 sq mi (425 km^{2})

Population (2008)
  - Total: 3,129
  - Density: 19.1/sq mi (7.36/km^{2})
- Time zone: UTC+1 (CET)

Oued M'Zi is a town and commune in Laghouat Province, Algeria. According to the 1998 census it has a population of 1,786.
