= Brida =

Coordinates: 33°54′22″N 1°47′04″E

Brida بريدة
- Commune and town
- Country: Algeria
- Province: Laghouat Province
- District: Brida

Area
  - Total: 137 sq mi (355 km^{2})

Population (2008)
  - Total: 6,395
  - Density: 46.7/sq mi (18.0/km^{2})
- Time zone: UTC+1 (CET)

Brida is a town and commune in Laghouat Province, Algeria. According to the 1998 census, it has a population of 5,742.
