= Laghouat Province =

Province of Algeria

Laghouat Province ولاية الأغواط
- Province
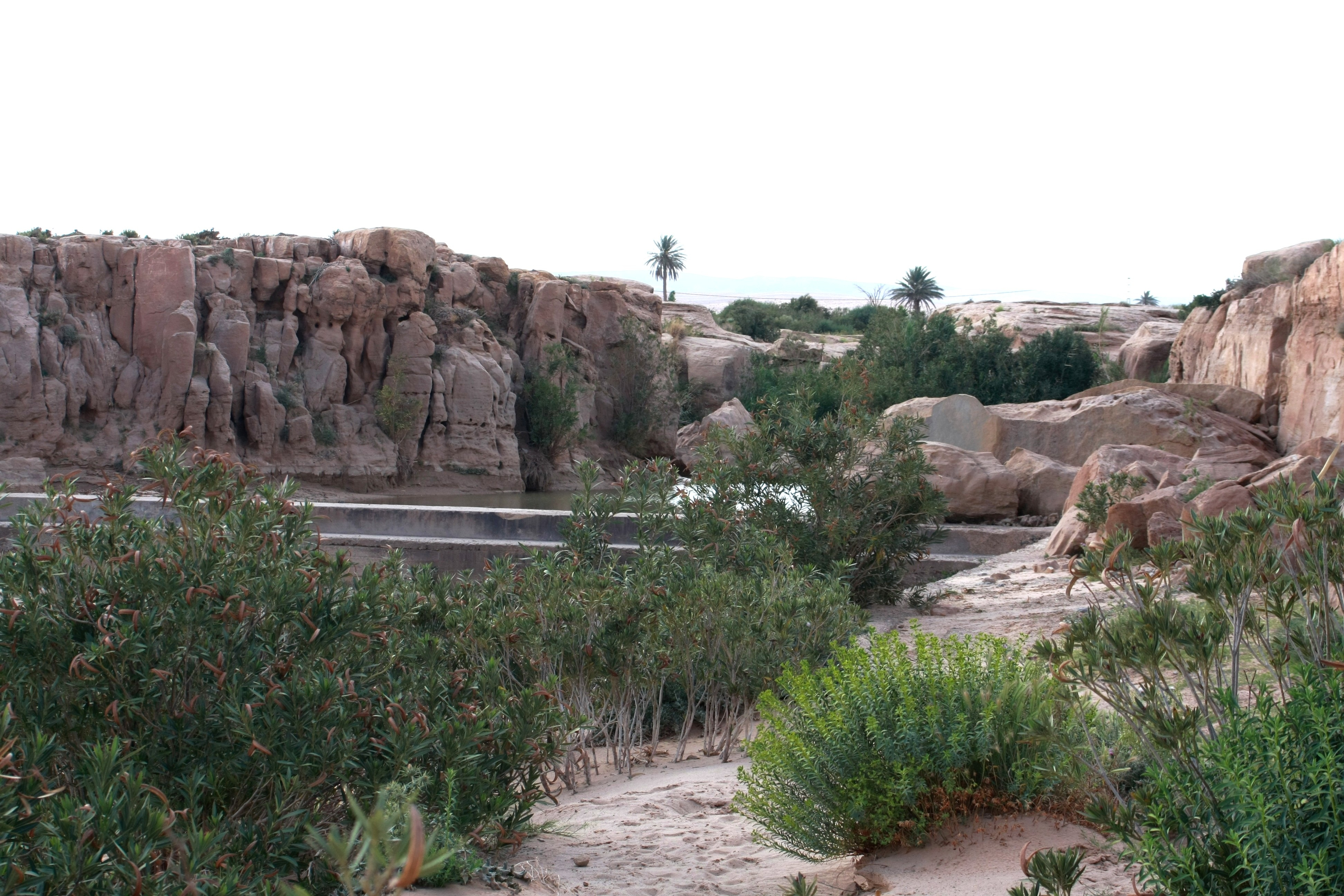
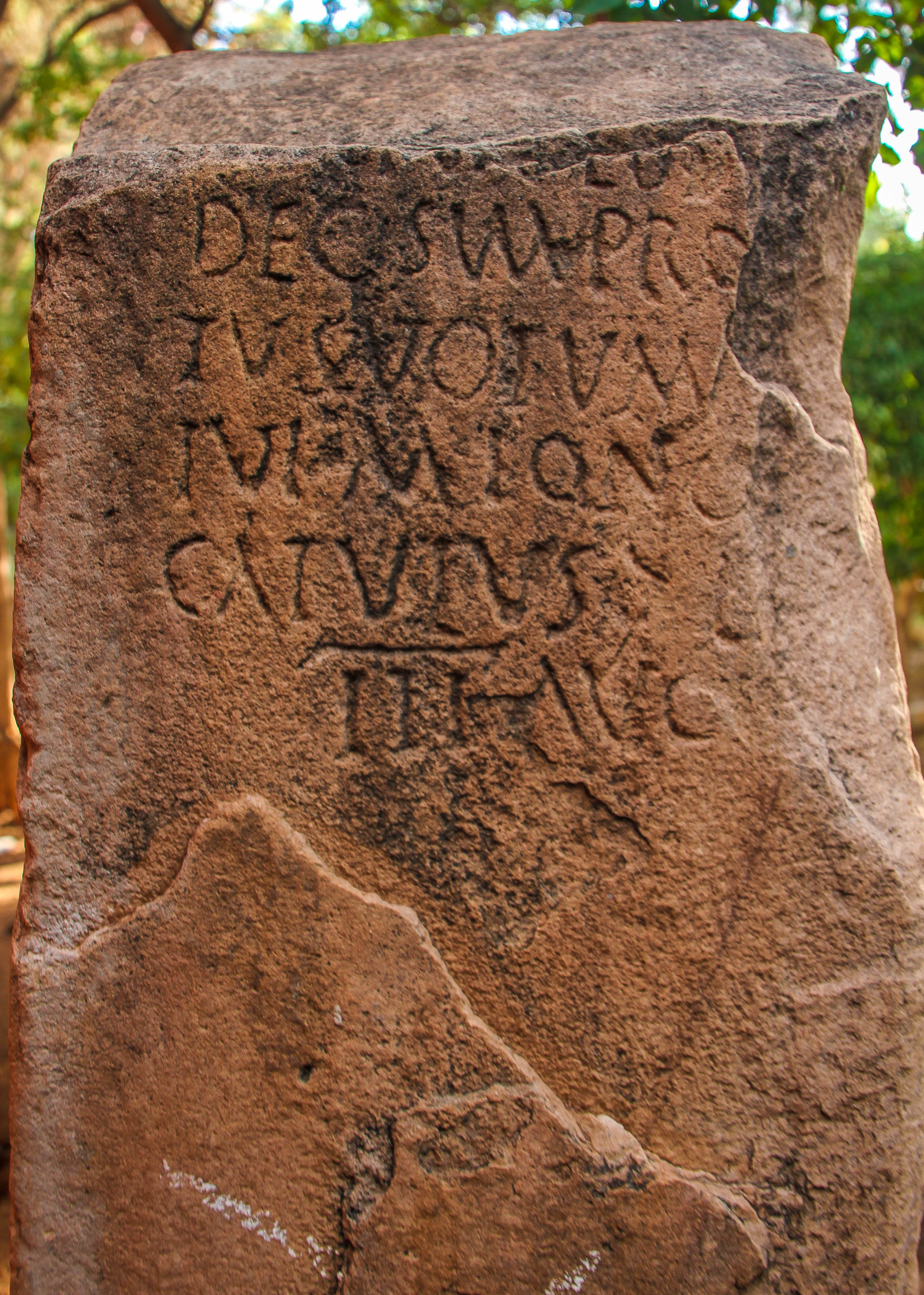

- Map of Algeria highlighting Laghouat
- Coordinates: 33°48′N 2°53′E
- Country: Algeria
- Capital: Laghouat

Area
  - Total: 25,057 km^{2} (9,675 sq mi)

Population (2008)
  - Total: 477,328
  - Density: 19.050/km^{2} (49.338/sq mi)
- Time zone: UTC+01 (CET)
- Area Code: +213 (0) 29
- ISO 3166 code: DZ-03
- Districts: 10
- Municipalities: 24

Laghouat (Arabic: ولاية الأغواط) is one of the fifty-eight provinces (wilaya) of Algeria. It is located in the north central part of Algeria. The province borders Tiaret Province to the north, El Bayadh Province to the west, Ghardaia Province to the south and Djelfa Province to the east. The capital of the province is Laghouat City. The province is famous for palm trees and livestock.

The province is a large producer of natural gas, containing important drilling sites in the region of Hassi R'Mel. Large reserves of natural gas have allowed Algeria to occupy an important position in the global energy market.

With exports exceeding the barrier of 20 billion dollars annually and a contribution to the gross domestic product of the State of Algeria of nearly 50 billion dollars, the province of Laghouat is among the most economically important provinces of Algeria. Most of this income comes from hydrocarbons - gas in particular - in addition to power stations and the livestock sector with more than 3 million heads of sheep. The state of Laghouat is one of the states of the Central Steppe region, which is located in the heart of the state of Algeria in northern Sahara Africa.

== Geography ==
=== Location and Nature ===
Located at an average altitude of 750 m above sea level, Laghouat Province is part of the Saharan Atlas Mountain range with some peaks rising above 2,000 m. For example, the Djebel Amour range reaches a top height of about 2,200 m.

Laghouat is nearly 400 km away from Algiers, the capital of Algeria.

The area's orchards, buildings and mosques span across a landscape of vast steppes, mountains, and pastures. The largest tributary in the area is the Chelif River and M'zi River, which originate from the Wadi Al-Tawil mountains.

The area is characterized by its pastoral, agricultural and mountainous character. It also contains an industrial region located at Hassi R'mel.

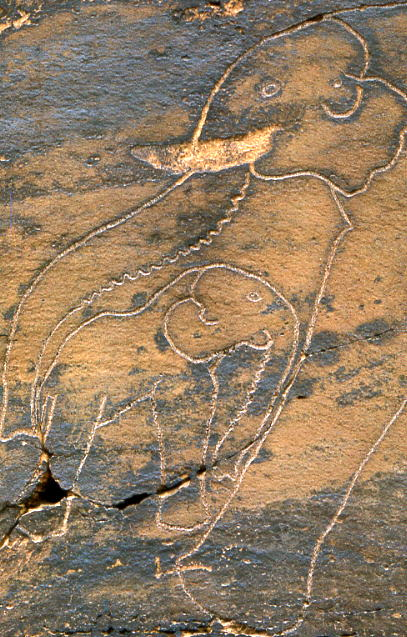
El Ghicha

=== Terrain ===
The province of Laghouat is located between Hautes Plaines and the desert foothills of the Saharan Atlas mountain range. It is surrounded on the two sides by the Amour Range west of the province and the mountains of Ouled Nile to the east. The province is divided into three main geographical regions: the Saharan Atlas mountains, the Steppe Plains, and the Desert.

==== Saharan Atlas ====
The Saharan Atlas Mountain Range is located in the northwest of the province, to the north of the Djebel Amour mountains. The Saharan Atlas mountains reach heights between 1000 and 1700 meters above sea level. We can distinguish them into two sub-regions which include the High Highlands area in the north and a mountainous area in the south. The districts of Gueltet Sidi Saâd, Aflou District, Brida District, El Ghicha District and Oued Morra District are located in this region. The most important characteristic of this area is that it is the source of the most significant rivers in Algeria, including the Chelif River, the Wadi el-Taweel and the Wadi Djedi through its tributary the M'zi River, distinguished by the presence of the green dam forests that blend into the grassy Steppe region.

==== Steppe ====
These grassland plains are located in the center of the province and are between 700 and 1000 meters above sea level. It is known as a grazing area as it contains many steppe plants and herbs. This region includes most of the province's vegetation, not counting the green dam forests located in the mountainous region. The Steppe region includes the districts of Sidi Makhlouf, Laghouat District, and northern Ain Madhi.

==== Desert ====
The southern part of Laghouat province is a desert plateau. This area includes the Hassi R'Mel District, the southern part of the Ksar El Hirane District and Ain Madhi District. It is distinguished by low vegetation cover characterized by Peganum plants. There are some hills here that are distinguished by various trees including the Ziziphus spina-christi and Pistacia atlantica. Various herbs and flowers are abundant here in the springtime.

== History ==
The province was created from the Oasis and Tiaret departments in 1974.

In 1984 Ghardaïa Province was carved out of the territory of Laghouat.

== Administrative division ==
The province is divided into 10 districts (daïras), which are further divided into 24 communes or municipalities.

=== Districts ===
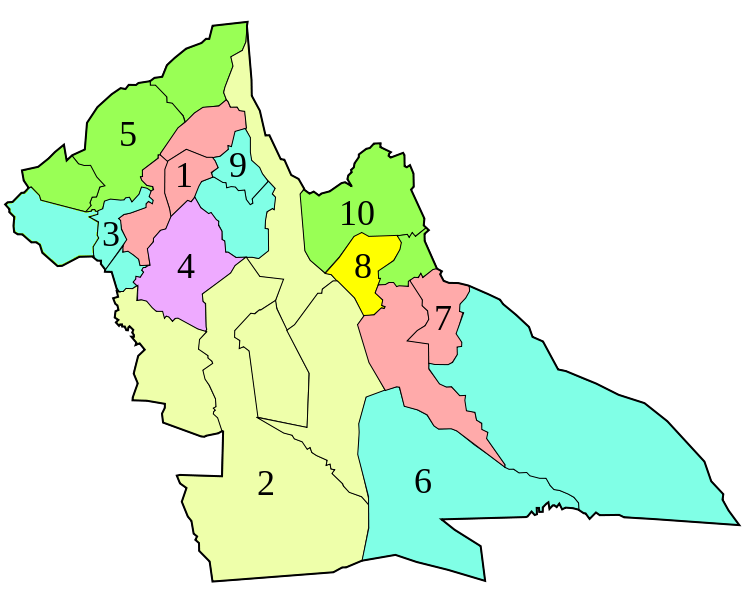
Districts of Laghouat Province

1. Aflou
2. Aïn Mahdi
3. Brida
4. El Ghicha
5. Gueltet Sidi Saâd
6. Hassi R'Mel
7. Ksar El Hirane
8. Laghouat
9. Oued Morra
10. Sidi Makhlouf

=== Communes ===
1. Aflou
2. Aïn Madhi
3. Aïn Sidi Ali
4. Beidha
5. Brida
6. El Assafia
7. El Ghicha
8. El Houaita
9. Gueltat Sidi Saad
10. Hadj Mechri
11. Hassi Delaa
12. Hassi R'Mel
13. Kheneg
14. Ksar El Hirane
15. Laghouat
16. Mekhareg (Benacer Ben Chohra)
17. Oued Morra
18. Oued M'Zi
19. Sebgag
20. Sidi Bouzid
21. Sidi Makhlouf
22. Tadjemout
23. Tadjrouna
24. Taouila

== Economy ==
=== Transportation ===
| Index | Amount | Length |
| National Road | 3 | 403 km |
| Number of Airports | 2 | |
| Railways | 1 | 50 km |

Laghouat Province contains three main roadways:

- The Trans-Saharan Road (N1): This international road links Algiers to Lagos, Nigeria in the south. It also connects the city of Laghouat with Djelfa in the north and Ghardaia in the south.
- National Road No. (23): This road connects Laghouat to Tiaret and the western port city of Mostaganem.
- National Road No. (47): Connects Aflou with El Bayadh and Aïn Séfra in the southwest.

The state has two airports, one of which is a local airport used mainly to transport pilgrims. The Laghouat Airport is officially called Moulay Ahmed Medeghri Airport and is named after the martyr Moulay Ahmed Madgari. The second airport, Hassi R'mel, is mainly used by the Sonatrach National Fuel Company to transport equipment, tires, experts, and contractors.

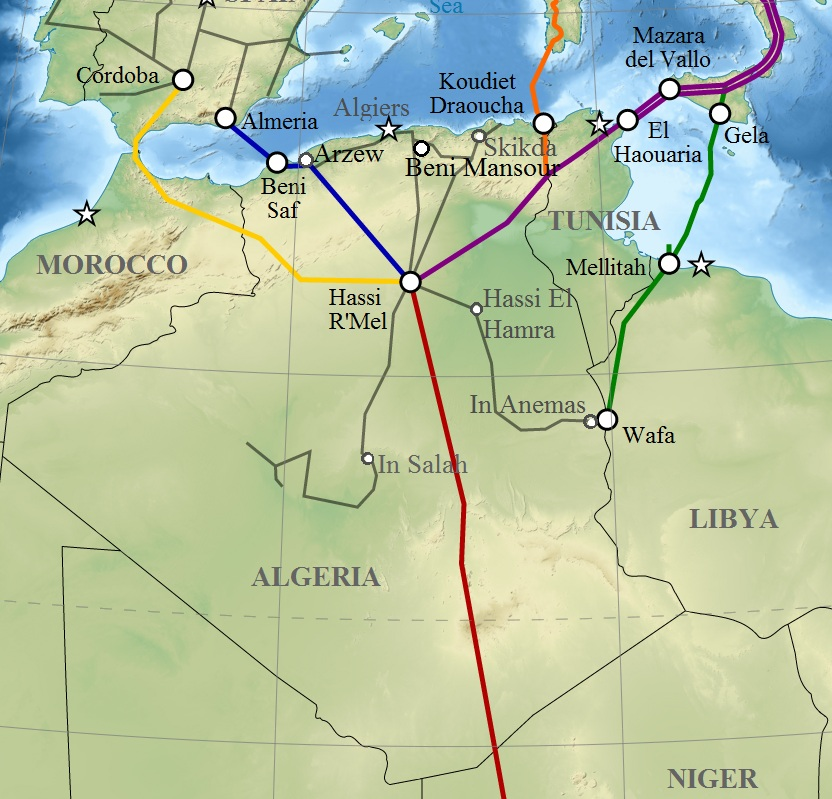
The strategic energy importance of the Hassi Ramel gas field

=== Energy ===
Laghouat Province is considered to be the second most important energy mandate in Algeria after Ouargla Province, because it contains one of the most important gas fields in Africa. This gas field is in the region of Hassi R'mel and contains many electricity production stations. These are located in the Telegmat region near Hassi R'mel and Kheneg. These areas also contain the largest solar PV plant in Algeria with a capacity of 60 MW.

==== CPV EKP solar power station ====
The CPV EKP solar power station is located 5 km from the municipality of Kheneg and 10 km from Laghouat in Algeria.

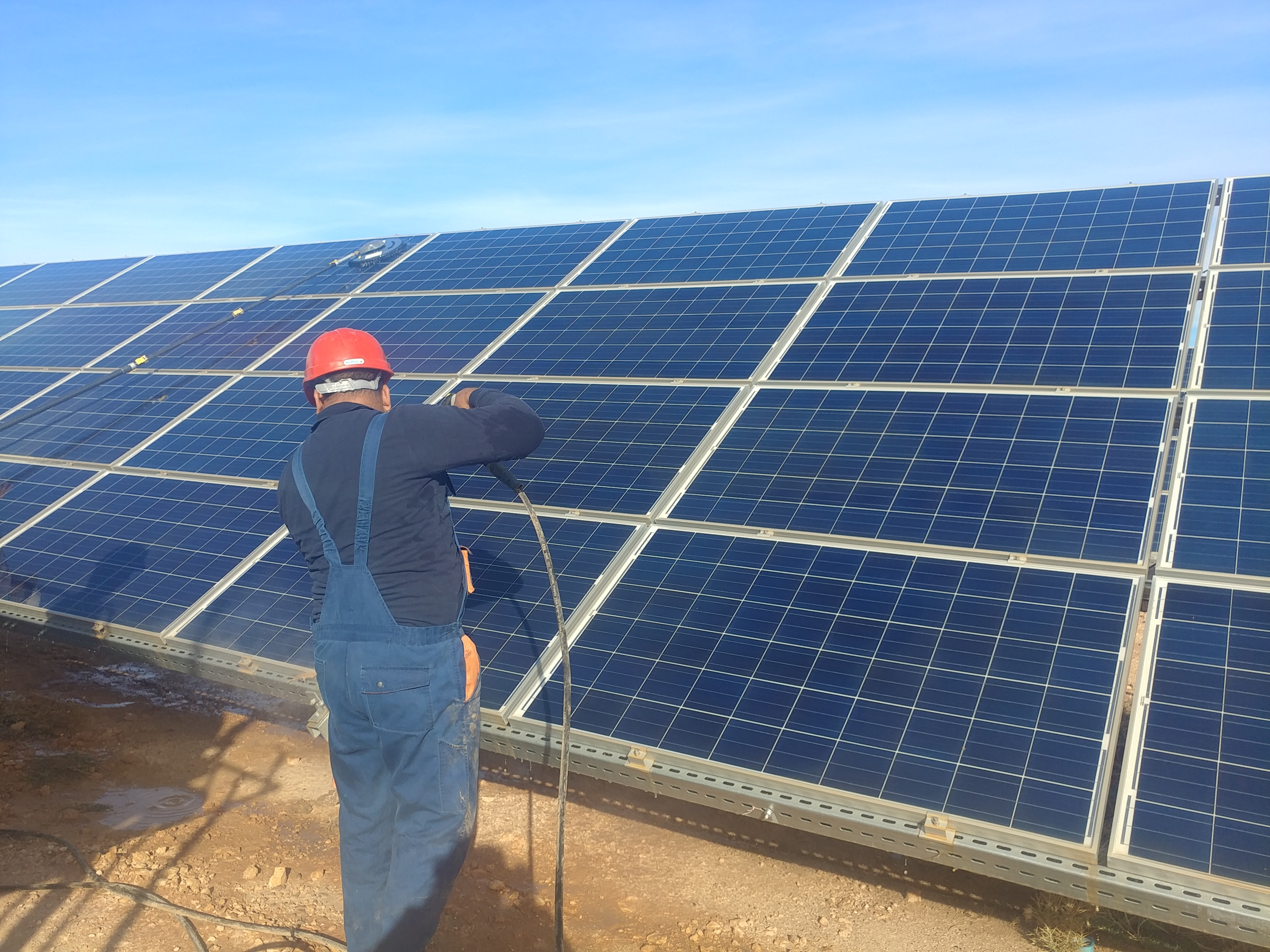
Cleaning the solar panels

The station sits on an area of 120 hectares and, on average, produces more than 300 MWh of electricity per day. It contains more than 240 thousand solar panels distributed over 5460 matrices, 2040 triple level junction boxes, 120 inverters, and 60 transformers. It is connected to a 60 kV high-voltage electricity transmission network by the lifting station, which contains 3 transformers with a capacity of 20 MVA each.

=== Livestock raising ===
Livestock in Laghouat province number around 4,000,000 cattle, sheep and goats. Sheep rank first in population with over 3 million heads, followed by goats, cows, camels, and horses (including mules and donkeys).

=== Tourism ===
The province's most popular tourist area is the district of Kef El Melh (the mountain of salt). It is located in the municipality of Tadjrouna near the border with El Bayadh Province. The largest tourist hotspot in the district is the Kordan Palace, or Crown Angle. Other tourist areas and natural sights include the Al-Ghaisheh, Taouila, Lalmaya, Ein Sefsifah, and Al-Huwaita. Laghouat is home to the Talemzane crater, or Madna Crater, a depression resulting from the impact of an ancient meteorite. It is the second largest crater in the world (based on depression circumference) and is found in the municipality of Hassi Delaa in the south.

Rock carvings El Ghicha

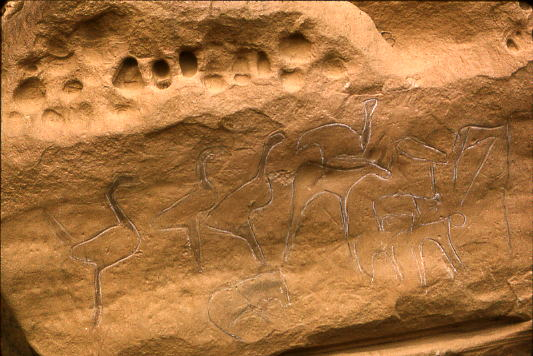

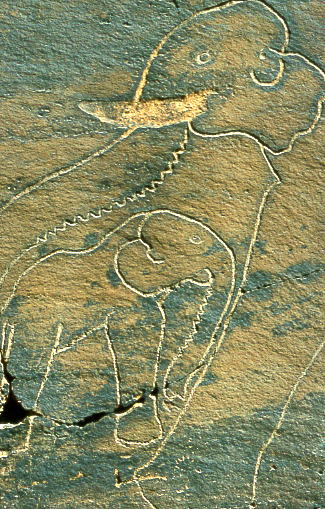

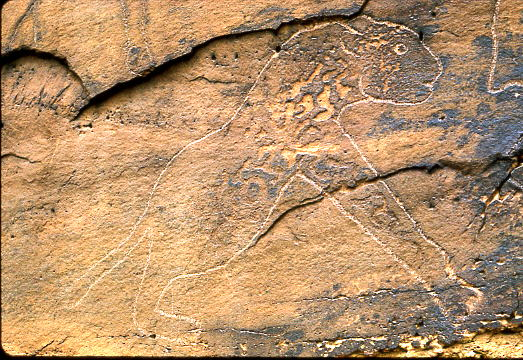

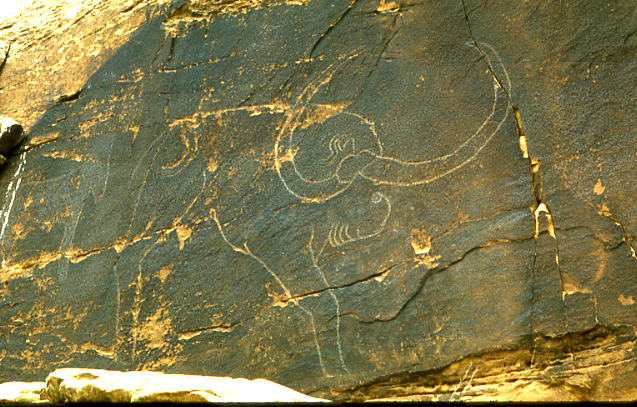
Rock carvings Sidi Makhlouf

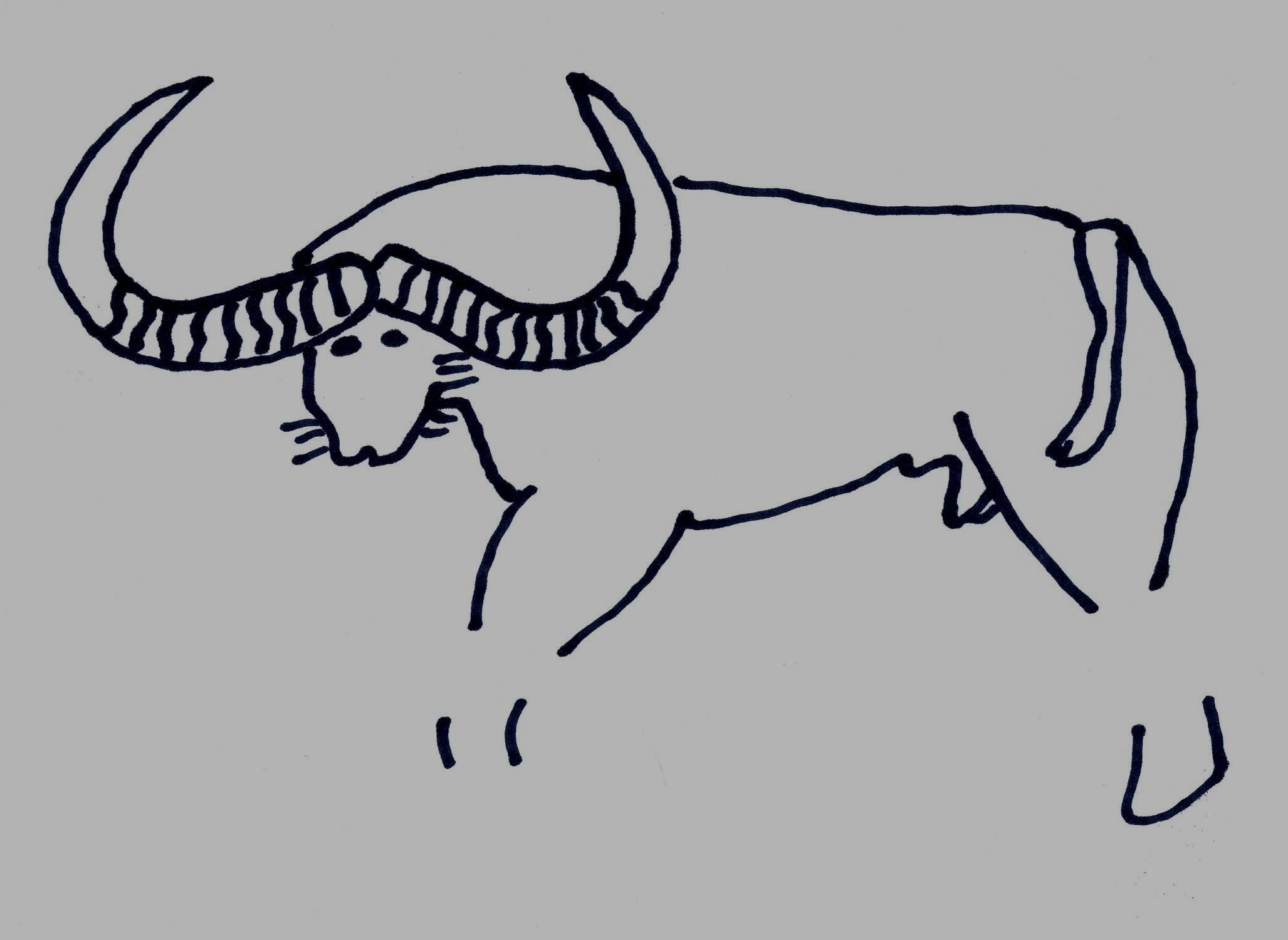

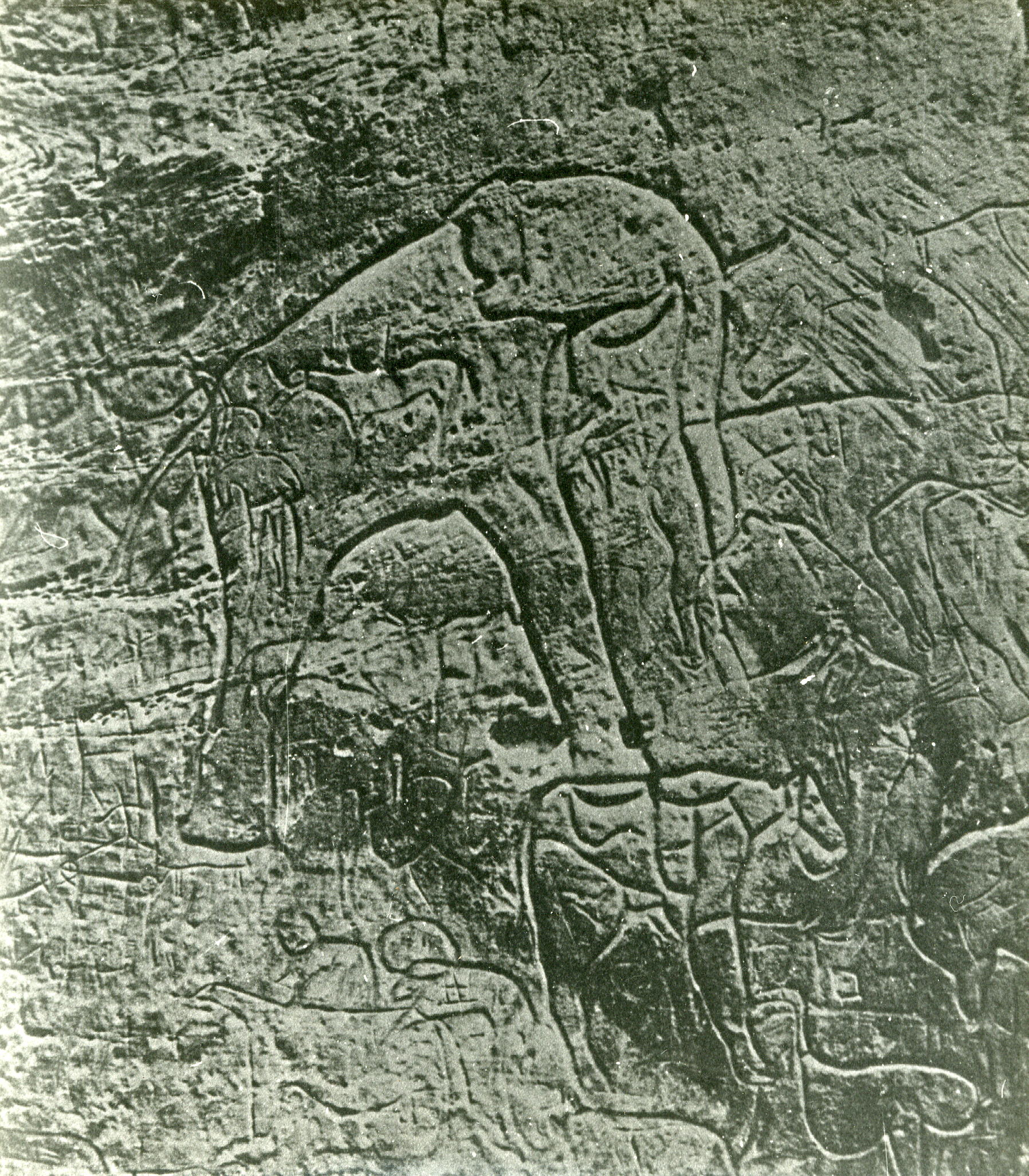

== See also ==
- Amour Range
- Saharan Atlas
