= Sidi Bouzid, Algeria =

Coordinates: 34°20′34″N 2°15′41″E

Sidi Bouzid, Algeria سيدي بوزيد
- Commune and town
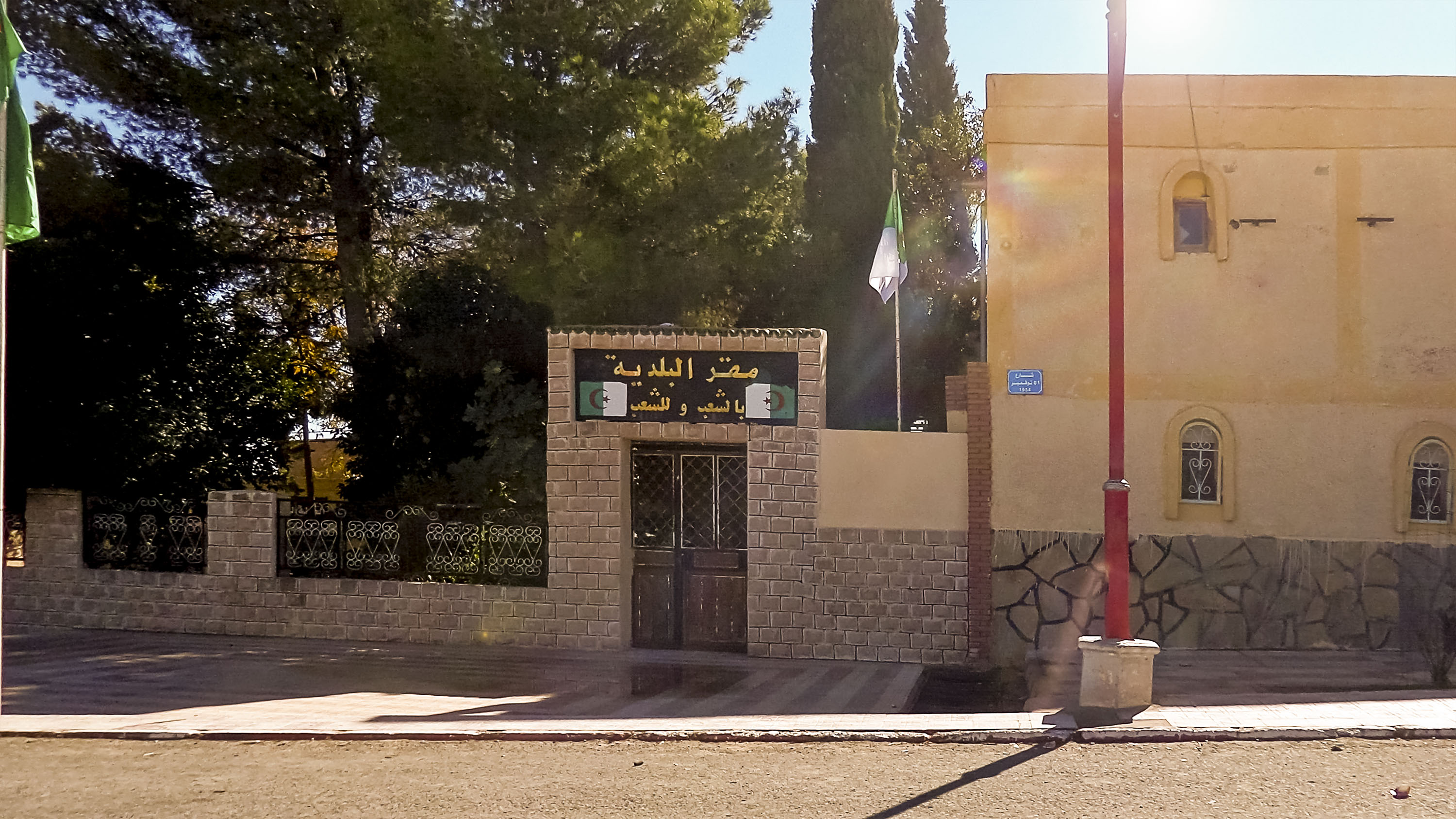
- office

- Country: Algeria
- Province: Laghouat Province
- District: Aflou

Population (2008)
  - Total: 5,191
- Time zone: UTC+1 (CET)

Sidi Bouzid, Algeria is a town and commune in Laghouat Province, Algeria. According to the 1998 census it has a population of 3864.
