= Rock art of the Djelfa region =

Coordinates: 34°21′01″N 3°15′42″E

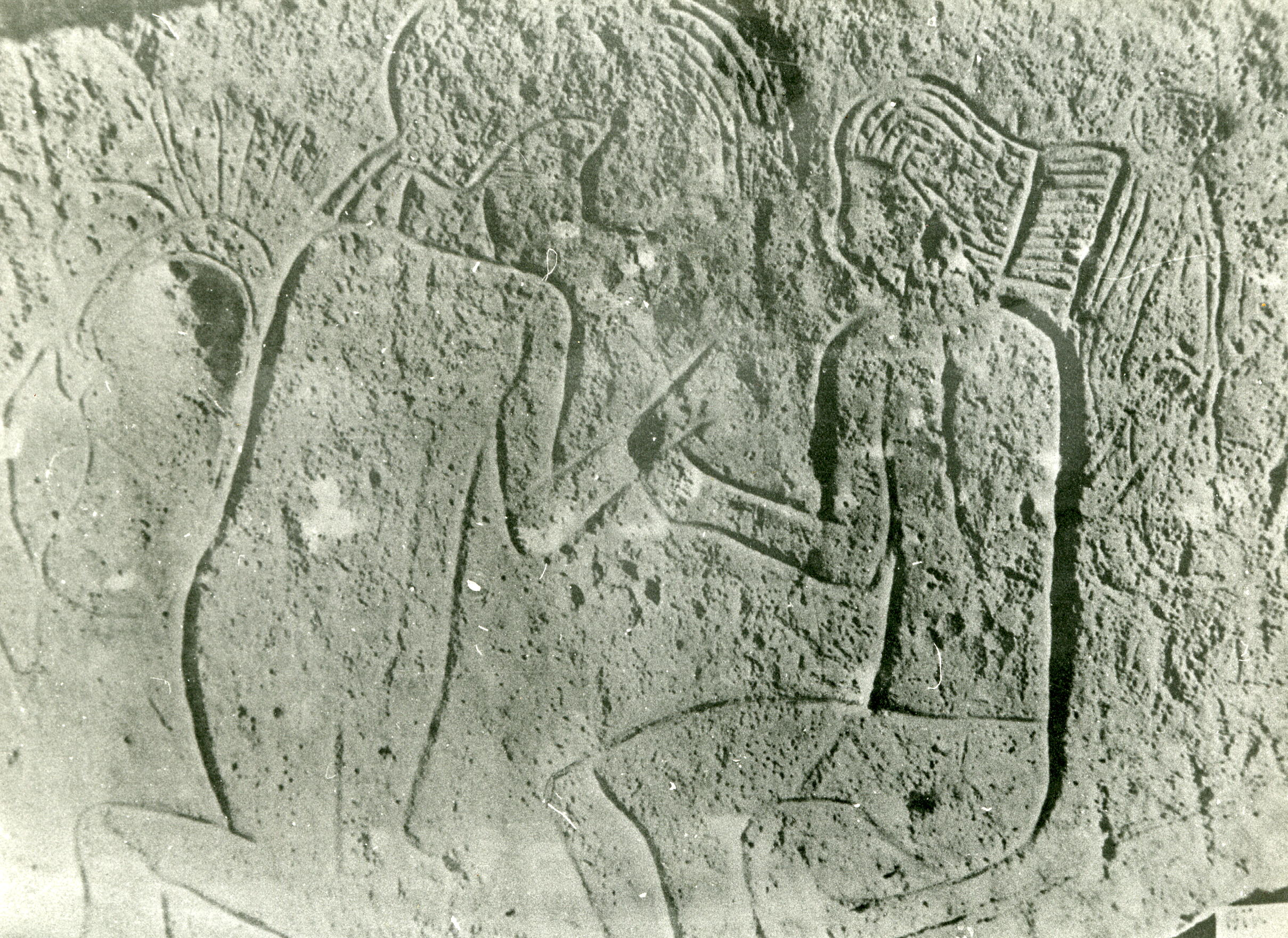
Neolithic art in Djelfa.

The rock art of the Djelfa region in the Ouled Naïl Range (Algeria) consists of prehistoric cave paintings and petroglyphs dating from the Neolithic age which have been recognized since 1914. Following the Saharan Atlas Mountains they follow on from those, to the west, of south Oran (the regions of Figuig, Ain Sefra, El Bayadh, Afalou and Tiaret), to which they are related. Comparable engravings have also been described further to the east, in the Constantine (Algeria) region.

== Localities and descriptions ==
Map of rock art in the Sahara

Some of the engravings of the Djelfa region seem to have been known since the 1850s (El Idrissia). Among the best-known, those of Zaccar were discovered in 1907, and Flamand described in 1914 the station of Daïet es Stel. In the mid-1960s the active Djelfa Council of Initiatives undertook to record engravings and paintings, and Father F. de Villaret, who accompanied the visitors, thus made known works from some twenty new stations, notably those of Oued el Hesbaïa and Aïn Naga. In total more than 1,162 engravings have been discovered in the region.

Henri Lhote referred to these engravings in his major work, Les Gravures rupestres du Sud-oranais, which he published in 1970 in the series of the Mémoires du Centre de recherches anthropologiques préhistoriques et ethnographiques (CRAPE). For him they could not "be separated archaeologically from those of south Oran, because they show with some variations the same style, the same technical formulae, the same patinations and the same fauna"(p. 194). It may therefore be possible to analyse them making use of the hypotheses and the classification which he developed. The engravings of the Djelfa region appeared to him like "foreign works, which are a copying (always of inferior quality) from those of south Oran", (p. 193), a region which for the author was "the principal centre of the rock art of the pre-Saharan regions." Some belong to the earliest stage of the large-scale Hartebeest school, like "The Apollo of Ouled Naïl", others are more recent or indeed (stylistically) more decadent.

Regretting "the misreading of the importance of the south Algerian rock art" in the work of Lhote, P. Huard and L. Allard published in 1976 in Lybica (CRAPE, Algiers) an important study on Les figurations rupestres de la région de Djelfa, Sud Algérois. The authors therein recorded forty-three numbered sites or stations which are with some exceptions located near the interior or at the edges of a triangle formed on the north by the town of Djelfa, on the south-west by the village of Sidi Makhlouf and on the south-east by the town of Messaad.

- The region of Djelfa on Wikimapia.

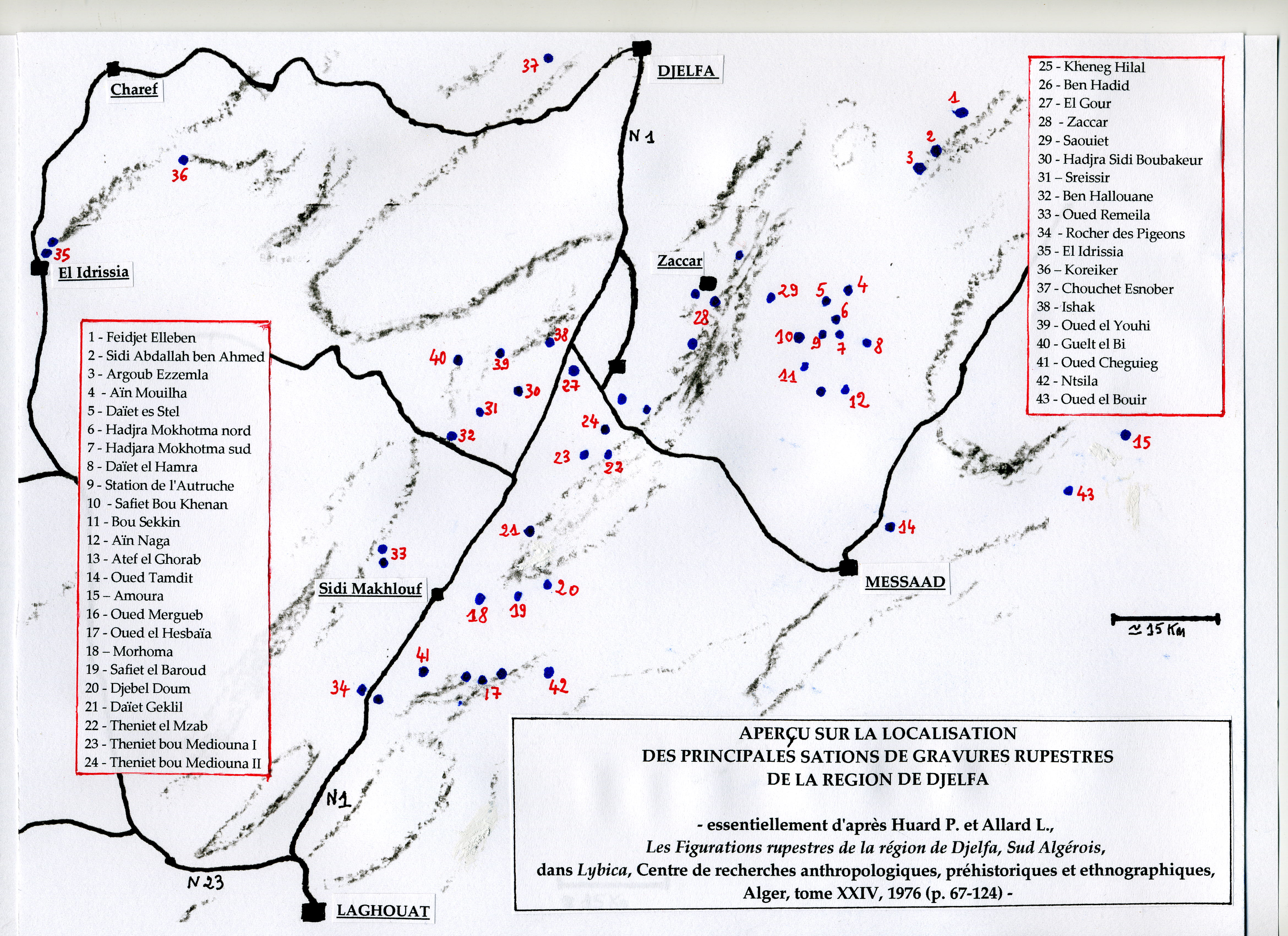

Around the road from Djelfa to Laghouat (just south of Sidi Makhlouf) twenty-three stations are shown: no 28 (Zaccar), 38 (Ishak), 39 (Oued el Youhi), 40 (Guelt el Bidha), 30 (Hadjra Sidi Boubakeur), 31 (Sreissir), 32 (Ben Hallouane), 27 (El Gour), 26 (Ben Hadid), 25 (Kheneg Hilal), 24 (Theniet bou Mediouna II), 23 (Theniet bou Mediouna I), 22 (Theniet el Mzab), 21 (Daïet Geklil), 16 (Oued Mergueb), 20 (Djebel Doum), 19 (Safiet el Baroud), 18 (Morhoma), 33 (Oued Remeila), 34 (Rocher des Pigeons "Pigeon Rock"), 41 (Oued Cheguieg), 17 (Oued el Hesbaïa), 42 (Ntsila). Three stations are in addition mentioned to the east of Djelfa: no 1 (Feidjet Elleben), 2 (Sidi Abdallah ben Ahmed), 3 (Argoub Ezzemla). Three other sites are found to the west: n° 37 (Chouchet Esnober), 36 (Koreiker), 35 (El Idrissia).

Around the road from Djelfa to Messaad (by Moudjbara) twelve stations follow roughly from north to south: no 29 (Saouiet), 4 (Aïn Mouilha), 5 (Daïet es Stel), 6 (Hadjra Mokhotma north), 7 (Hadjara Mokhotma south), 10 (Safiet Bou Khenan), 9 (Station de l'Autruche "Ostrich"), 8 (Daïet el Hamra), 11 (Bou Sekkin), 12 (Aïn Naga), 13(Atef el Ghorab), 14 (Oued Tamdit). To the east of Messad two final stations are named: no 43 (Oued el Bouir) and 15 (Amoura).

The engravings are located near dwelling sites, shown by the presence of worked flints and debitage, "stratified in various levels or at the foot of cliffs of reddish sandstone, the patina of which can become nearly black, which run along the djebels or stand at the edges of the oueds." They are "by-and-large arranged in little separate groups", the monumental friezes or very richly decorated murals like those of Oued el Hesbaïa or Aïn Naga being "exceptions".

Recognizing that the engravings of the Djelfa region are "similar to those of south Oran by subject and technique", P. Huard and L. Allard judge however that they have a rich cultural content of their own which, notably, show the ancient buffalo as bearers of attributes of the heads, and the fact that almost all the ovines (sheep) are endowed with classic spheroids or horns enclosed in a ring, which are a later stylization of the motif"(p. 67). According to these authors "The introduction in the most ancient stage of the south-Oranian of rams with spheroids can hardly tally with the south-Algerian material, where the most accomplished depictions are often associated with men in developed costume, whereas others, associated with cattle, are clearly of a pastoral epoch" (p. 71).

What is more "The 'bovidian' stage, which would come only in the fourth place in the sequence of the south-Oranian, where it shows a 'decadent' character, is much more developed in the south Algerian." Deducing that these evidences "show that in the two sectors, its origin must certainly be more ancient", Huard and Allard prefer to speak "of a pastoral stage of long duration, with cows and sheep"(p. 71).

== The "Hunters" Stage ==
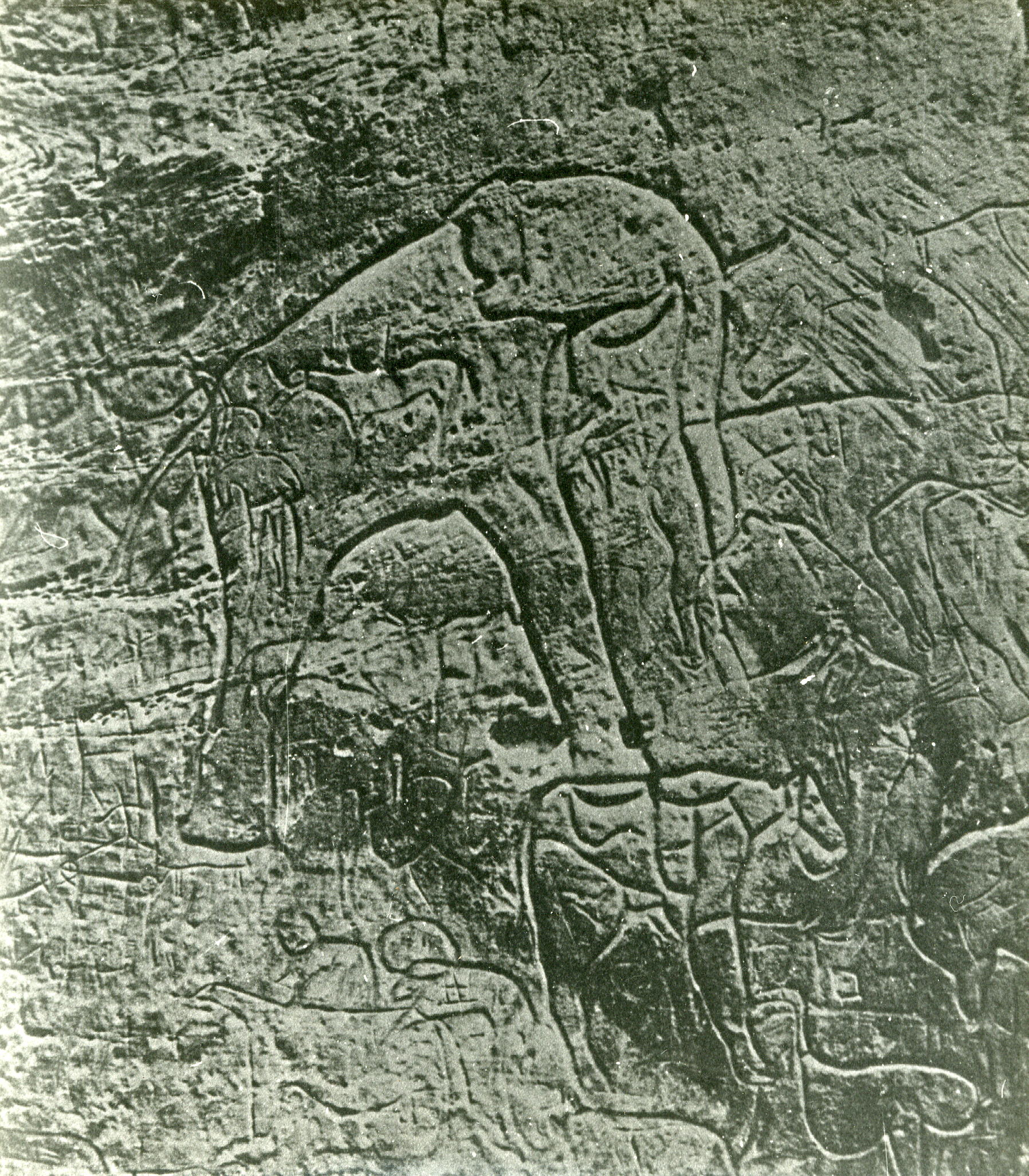
Oued el Hesbaïa.

In the stage of Hunters the authors gather the depictions of the large wild fauna: ancient buffalo (or Hartebeest), elephants, rhinoceros, lions, ostriches and human figures.

Of the seventeen buffalo recorded in the region, twelve belong to the large, naturalistic art and are similar to those of the south-Oranian. They are found at Oued el Hesbaïa (frieze of three buffalo, including one of more than two meters), Aïn Naga (two buffalo in procession), at Station de l'Autruche (buffalo of 1.50 meters surmounted by a hollowed disc), Djebel Doum (buffalo of 2.35 meters of which the left horn supports a "lengthened semi-circular attribute"), Safiet el Baroud, Hadjra Mokhotma north (buffalo of 2.63 meters, where a human figure seems to touch the horns), Kheneg Hilal (buffalo of 1.20 m.) and Ben Hallouane.

Large, medium or small, the twenty-two elephants seem to belong to various ages. The largest (1 to 2 m), naturalistic in style, are found at Aïn Naga, Theniet bou Mediouna I, Oued Remeilia, Aïn Mouilha, Oued el Hesbaïa (where the "elephant panel", an accumulation of depictions superimposed through the centuries, shows six), Safiet Bou Khenan, Zaccar, Feidjet Elleben and Bou Sekkin.

Seven rhinoceros, of lesser quality and often decadent in style, are recorded at five stations, at Oued Remeila (the oldest), Feidjet Elleben, Bou Sekkin, Aïn Naga, and Oued el Hesbaïa.

Nine representations of Hartebeest antelopes (Bubalis alcelaphus boselaphus) are in naturalistic style. The most famous is that of Zaccar, devoured by a lion (1.50 m in length). A similar scene is found at Daïet el Hamra. At Hadjra Mokhotma north, the animal is confined within a circular trap. Other antelope have been engraved at Safiet el Baroud, Theniet el Mzab and Feidjet Elleben. Otherwise there are numerous antelope-type creatures, often much stylized and in small-scale, like those of Sidi Abdallah ben Ahmed and Safiet bou Khenan, related to the style called the Tazina School, found in south-Oran.

Eighteen in number, the lions represented can be classed into three groups: "naturalistic lions in profile, three times shown in hunting scenes" (Oued el Hesbaïa, Zaccar, Daïet el Hamra, Hadjara Mokhotma north, Oued Remeilia), "fairly large lions with the stylized head facing and the body in profile", "weaker in style and carving method", "late by comparison with the south-Oran prototypes" (Djebel Doum, Kheneg Hilal, Hadjra Mokhotma south), and thirdly the "smaller felines, lightly drawn and generally late", "of mediocre style and carving method"(pp. 81–85).

The ostriches, fairly numerous, are (with the exception of the representations at Safiet bou Khenan and at Oued el Hesbaïa) "generally of a poor quality." boars, in a group of three, are on the other hand rare, limited to the stations of El Idrissia (a lost group) and Sreissir.

The human depictions are forty in number notably at Oued el Hesbaïa, El Gour, Theniet bou Mediouna II, Aïn Naga, Daïet es Stel, Oued Remeilia, Safiet bou Khenan, Hadjra Mokhotma south and Ben Hadid. Authors attribute to them the model of the "twenty-five characteristic traits of physical or psychic valour of the hunter culture" which they have identified "in the Nile area and in various Saharan regions" (p. 85).

Thus they explain the images of men under animal skins, the wearing of false tails and phallic protections, masks, the presence of ithyphallic depictions and of men touching animals (buffalo, antelopes and elephants at Hadjra Mokhotma north, Theniet bou Mediouna II and Bou Sekkin). Among the weapons they record bows, long and curved weapons, clubs, a hatchet and a shield. Several traps are depicted as well as the hands. Thus, "all the cultural traits of hunters are attested in the Djelfa region, apart from the lasso and the spirale (?bolas), which are by compensation strongly represented at Tassili in the Oued Djerat sector."(p. 93).

== Early stages of domestication ==
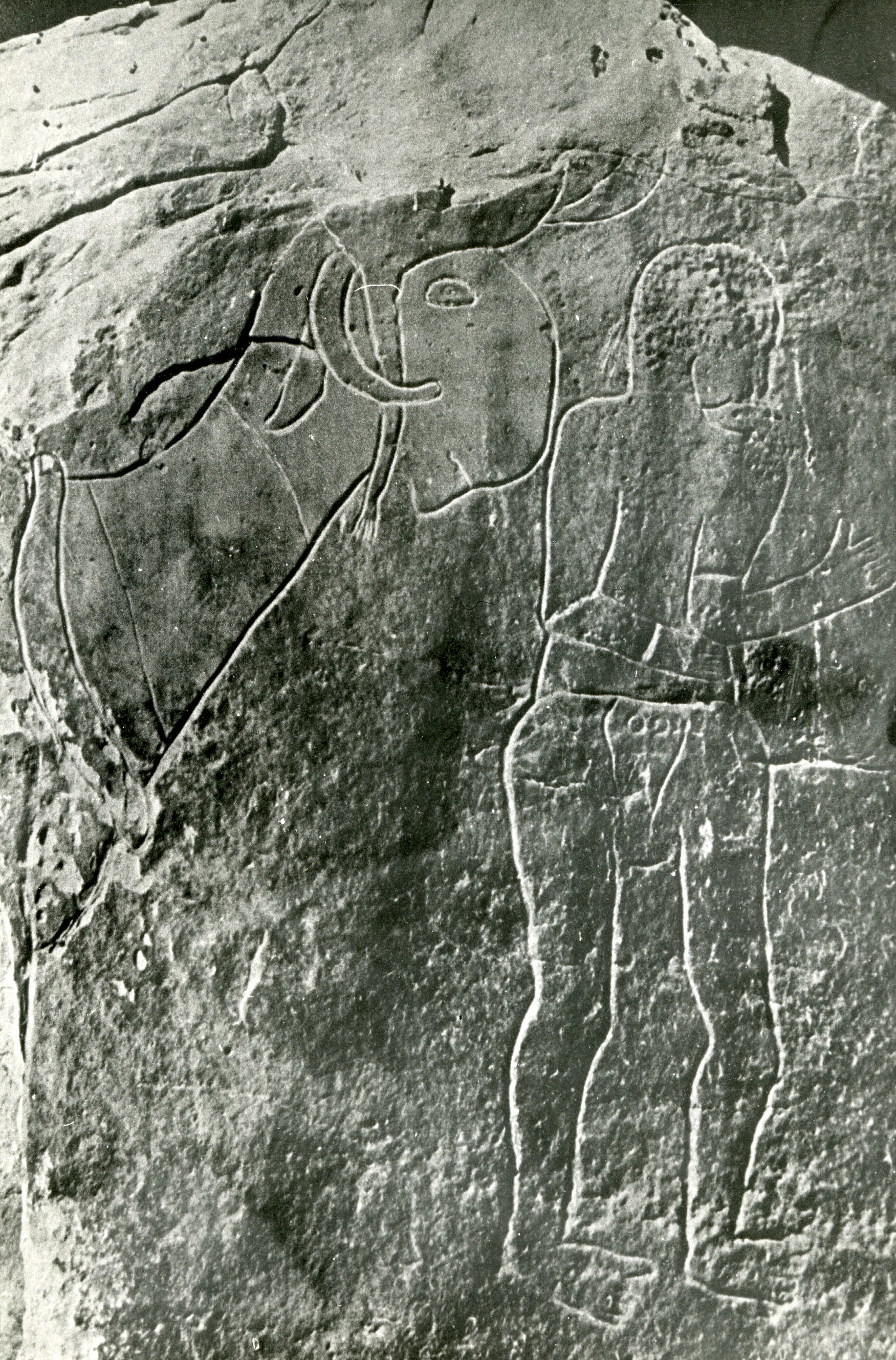
Aïn Naga.

Several antelopes and cattle carry signs of human appropriation, especially collars. But it is above all about thirty representations of rams which belong rather to the world of shepherds than of hunters, stretching "through a long period going all the way forward to an advanced stage of domestication" (p. 97). Eight among them are rams with spheroids, of which five are associated with human figures (Aïn Naga, Daïet es Stel, Oued el Hesbaïa, Saouiet).

It is in this group that some of the most famous masterpieces of the region are found, such as the Ram of Aïn Naga, about twice natural size, found by Father F. de Villaret and published by the Djelfa Syndicate of Initiative. The animal, which wears a spheroid framed by feathers, a cheek pendant and a collar with chevrons, is led by a man dressed in a loin-cloth with buttons, wearing bracelets, whose hair-do falls across the nape of his neck in three swathes.

Of the other ovines (sc. sheep), sometimes wearing collars, show their horns enclosed in a ring or by discs (only four depictions show only a collar, or appear without attributes). At Hadjra Sidi Boubakeur a group composed of a ram, a ewe and a large bull denotes "a well established domestication" (p. 106). Other rams can be seen at Khenneg Hilal, Oued el Hesbaïa, Safiet bou Khenan, Theniet el Mzab, Hadjra Mokhotma and Aïn Naga.

The rock art of the Djelfa region shows large naturalistic cattle (Zaccar) and sub-naturalistic ones (Bou Sekkin), the others dating from the pastoral era. Their horns are similarly closed into a ring and they sometimes wear devices in segments of a circle, or of textile, which are perhaps means of carrying things (Hadjra Sidi Boubakeur, Teniet el Mzab, Hadjra Mohkotma, Ben Hadid, Bou Sekkin, Safiet bou Khenan and Oued Mergueb).

The "pastoral scenes" often associating men and animals are found at Hadjra Sidi Boubakeur, Hadjra Mohkotma sud, Aïn Mouilha (men with "bandes molletières"), Morhoma, Daïet es Stel and Zaccar. Other humanly-signifying depictions, ithyphallic images and women displaying, are found at Safiet bou Khenan, Theniet bou, Mediouna II, and Daïet el Hamra.

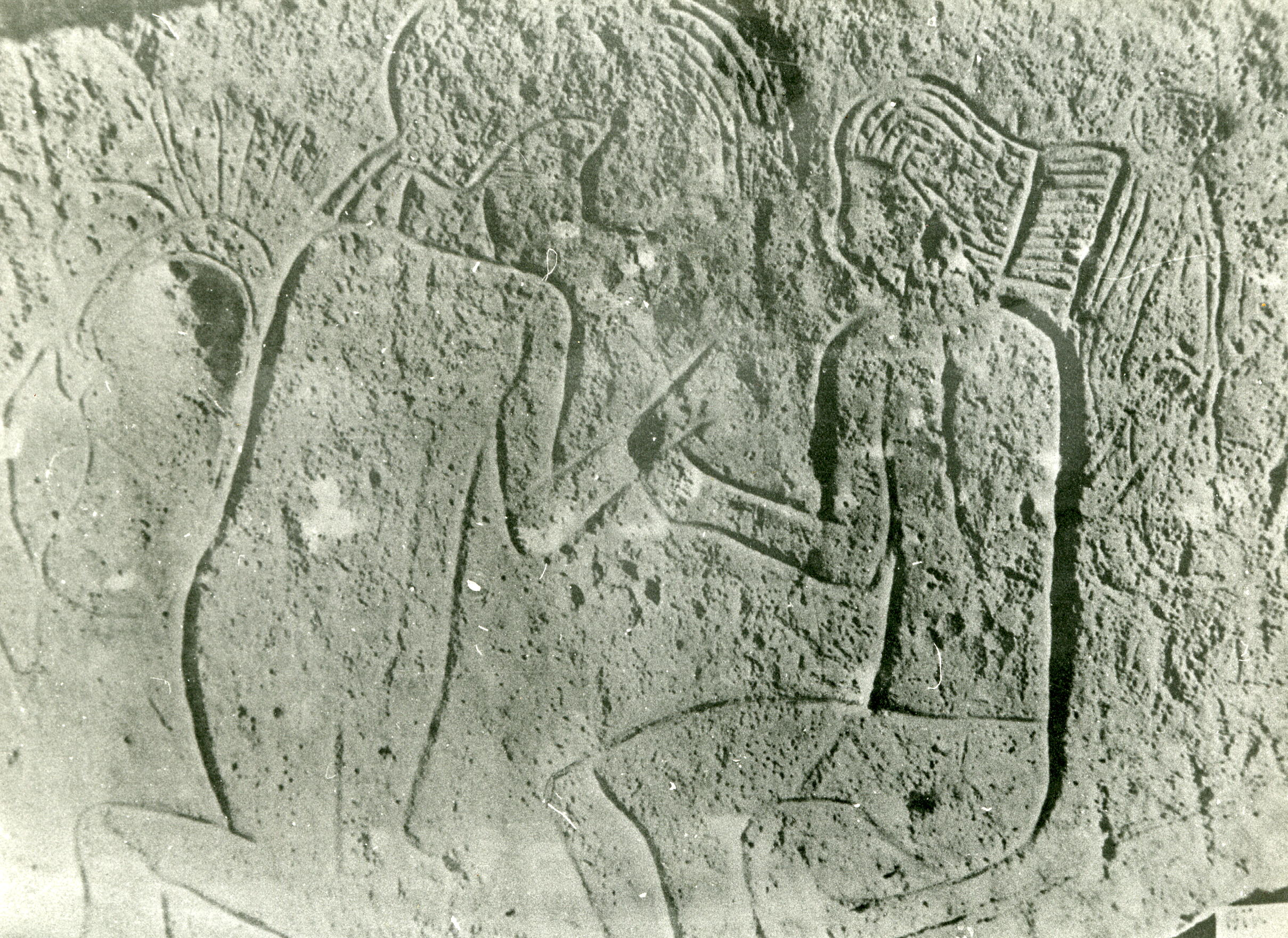
Aïn Naga, engraving called "The timid lovers".

At Theniet el Mzab there is also found the famous engraving of a man with three-segmented hair style and square shirt-front, and at Aïn Naga that of the "timid lovers" in which the man carries an object like a haricot, shield or quiver surmounted by arrows, (as in south Oran at Khreloua), a hairdo or a headpiece with a tuft of hair falling forwards and with three swathes falling over the neck (a detail which one sees again at Aïn Naga and in south Oran) while the woman shows a carefully maintained hair arrangement, held behind with a clip.

One also finds among the engravings of the Djelfa region hounds and horses of various epochs.

In addition, three sites with cave paintings are located at Djebel Doum, at the Zaccar south site (several archers, a possibly human figure and tortoises) and at Hadjra Mokhotma south.

In 1968, elements of a lithic industry belonging to the Capsian were discovered in situ by D. Grébénart at Aïn Naga and dated to 5500 B.C., plus or minus 220.

== The probable ancient regional ecology ==
North Africa enjoyed a fertile climate during the subpluvial era; what is now the Sahara supported a savanna type of ecosystem, with elephant, giraffe, and other grassland and woodland animals now typical of the Sahel region south of the desert. Historian and Africanist Roland Oliver has described the scene as follows:

[In] the highlands of the central Sahara beyond the Libyan desert,... in the great massifs of the Tibesti and the Hoggar, the mountaintops, today bare rock, were covered at this period with forests of oak and walnut, lime, alder and elm. The lower slopes, together with those of the supporting bastions — the Tassili and the Acacus to the north, Ennedi and Air to the south — carried olive, juniper and Aleppo pine. In the valleys, perennially flowing rivers teemed with fish and were bordered by seed-bearing grasslands.

== See also ==
- Rock engravings of Oued Djerat
- Neolithic
- List of Stone Age art
- Rock art
- Henri Lhote
- Tassili
- Green Sahara

== Sources ==
- Huard P. et Allard L., Les Figurations rupestres de la région de Djelfa, Sud Algérois, dans Lybica, Centre de recherches anthropologiques, préhistoriques et ethnographiques, Algiers, vol XXIV, 1976 (pp. 67–124) [with a map and, in appendix, an analytical gazetteer of the rock stations of the Djelfa region listing for each station the basic account of the drawings].

== Bibliography ==
(Publications treating the engraved rock figures of Djelfa)

- Flamand, G.B.M., Deux stations nouvelles de pierres écrites découvertes dans le Cercle de Djelfa, in "L'Anthropologie", XXV, 1914 (pp. 433–458).
- Flamand, G.B.M., Les Pierres écrites, Paris, Masson, 1921 (pp. 314–318).
- Vaufrey, R., L'Art rupestre nord-africain, Paris, Masson, 1939.
- Bellin, P., L'art rupestre des Ouled Naïl, in "Bull. Sté préhist. franç.", LIV, fas. 5-6, mai-juin 1957 (pp. 299–330).
- Tixier, L., Gravures rupestres de Bou Saâda (Algérie), in "Bull. Soc. royale belge d'études géol. et archéol.", XVII, 1958-1960 (pp. 21–27).
- Lethielleux J., Vestiges préhistoriques et protohistoriques de la région de Djelfa, dans "Lybica", XII, CRAPE, Algiers, 1965.
- Lefebvre G., La station rupestre de Daïet es Stel, in "Lybica, tome XV, CRAPE, Alger, 1967 (pp. 207-213).
- Grébénart D., Aïn-Naga. Capsien et Néolithique des environs de Messad (département de Médéa), dans "Lybica", XVII, CRAPE, Alger, 1969 (pp. 135–197).
- Syndicat d'Initiative de Djelfa, Dans les monts Ouled Naïl, in "El Djezaïr, n° 13, Alger, 1970 (pp. 42–48).
- Camps, G., Les Civilisations préhistoriques de l'Afrique du Nord et du Sahara, Paris, Douin, 1974.
- Huard P. et Leclant, Recherches sur la culture des chasseurs anciens du Nil et du Sahara, CRAPE, Algiers, 1977 (?).
- Aumassip, Ginette, Trésors de l'Atlas, Alger, Entreprise nationale du Livre, 1986.
- François de Villaret, Siècles de steppe, Jalons pour l'histoire de Djelfa, Centre de Documentation Saharienne, Ghardaia (Algérie), 1995.
