= Rock art of the Figuig region =

Map of rock art in the Sahara

The rock art of the Figuig region of Morocco and Algeria are prehistoric engravings from the Neolithic period, similar to those found in the South Oran region. Along the Saharan Atlas, they precede the engravings in the eastern regions of Ain Sefra, El-Bayadh, Aflou, and Tiaret. Comparable engravings have also been described further east, around Djelfa and in the Constantine region.

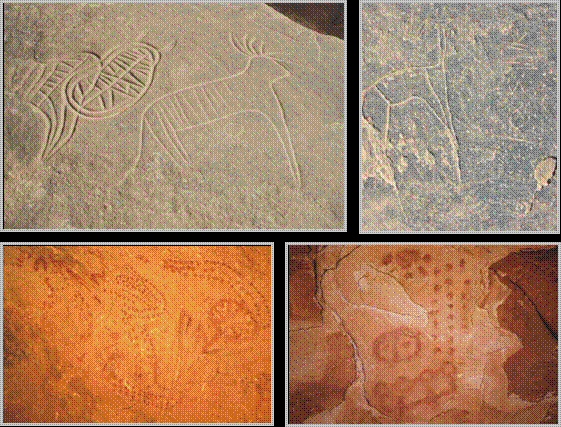
Overview of the rock-art

== History ==
Less famous than the Tassili figures, the engravings of the South Oran region have nonetheless been the subject of studies since 1863. The most important works were carried out by A. Pomel (from 1893 to 1898), Stéphane Gsell (from 1901 to 1927), G. B. M. Flamand (from 1892 to 1921), Leo Frobenius and Hugo Obermaier (in 1925), Abbé Henri Breuil (from 1931 to 1957), L. Joleaud (from 1918 to 1938), and Raymond Vaufrey (from 1935 to 1955).

In 1955 and 1964, Henri Lhote spent several months in the region, allowing him to complement previous research, add hundreds of new descriptions, and publish "Les Gravures rupestres du Sud-oranais" in 1970 in the series "Mémoires du Centre de recherches anthropologiques préhistoriques et ethnographiques" (CRAPE), directed in Algiers by Mouloud Mammeri (Arts et Métiers graphiques, Paris, 210 pages and photographic reproductions).

More recent and comprehensive works are known, notably those by Malika Hachid (numerous fieldwork, inventories, and publications since 1979), Father François Cominardi (1919), and J. Iliou (1980).

== Locations ==
Out of the 69 recorded and numbered sites in Henri Lhote's work, 6 belong to the Figuig region, a city located in Morocco, but some are located beyond the border in Algeria: Tisserfine (1), Beni-Ounif (2), Djebel Mélias (3), col des Zénaga (4), Djebel Youssef (5), and Djattou (6).

== Bibliography ==
- Vaufrey (Raymond), Préhistoire de l'Afrique, tome II, Au nord et à l'est de la grande forêt, Tunis, Service des Publications et échanges de l'Université de Tunis, 1969 (372 p.).
- Aumassip (Ginette), Trésors de l'Atlas, Alger, Entreprise nationale du Livre, 1986.
- Henri Lhote, Les Gravures rupestres du Sud-oranais, Arts et Métiers graphiques, Paris, 1970.
- Hachid (Malika), El-Hadra el-Mektouba. Les Pierres écrites de l'Atlas saharien, Alger, ENAG, 1992, 1 tome de texte, 1 tome de plus de 400 photos

== See also ==
- List of Stone Age art
- Draa River
