= Rock art of south Oran =

Neolithic period artistic rock carvings in Oran Province, Algeria

The rock art of south Oran, are prehistoric engravings dating from the Neolithic period, which are found in the south of Oran Province, Algeria, in the Saharan Atlas Mountains, in the regions (from west to east) of Figuig, Ain Sefra, El-Bayadh, Aflou and Tiaret. Comparable engravings have been described, even further east, around Djelfa and in the region of Constantine. Although in the past some archaeologists affirmed that these engravings derived from European Upper Paleolithic art, this theory is today definitively rejected.

== History ==
Less famous than the rock art at the Tassili n'Ajjer site, the South Oran engravings have however been the subject of study since 1863. The most important works are notably those of Auguste Pomel (from 1893 to 1898), Stéphane Gsell (from 1901 to 1927), Georges-Barthélemy Médéric Flamand (from 1892 to 1921), Leo Frobenius and Hugo Obermaier (in 1925), l'Abbé Henri Breuil (from 1931 to 1957), L. Joleaud (from 1918 to 1938), and Raymond Vaufrey (from 1935 to 1955).

In 1955 and 1964 Henri Lhote had visits of several months to the region which allowed him to complete his former researches, to add hundreds of new descriptions and in 1970 to publish Les gravures rupestres du Sud-oranais in the series Mémoires du Centre de recherches anthropologiques préhistoriques et ethnographiques (CRAPE) directed at Algiers by Mouloud Mammeri. A notable part of the work was particularly devoted to the engravings of the El-Bayadh region. For Henri Lhote the South Oran region constitutes one of the "three great centres of art of the antelope age" with Tassili ("Oued Djèrat") and Fezzan.

In this work Lhote tells that a hearth found at the "Station of Méandre", near to Brézina, had been dated to 3900 years B.C., without this figure being capable of "being attributed to a definite category of the engravings which ornament the 'walls' of the station." The oldest of these engravings, on the other hand, show many affinities with those of Tassili which he proposes the minimum date of around 5000. There is therefore room, according to him, to "adopt it also for the South-Oranian material until better information may be forthcoming."
The region of El-Bayadh on WikiMapia.

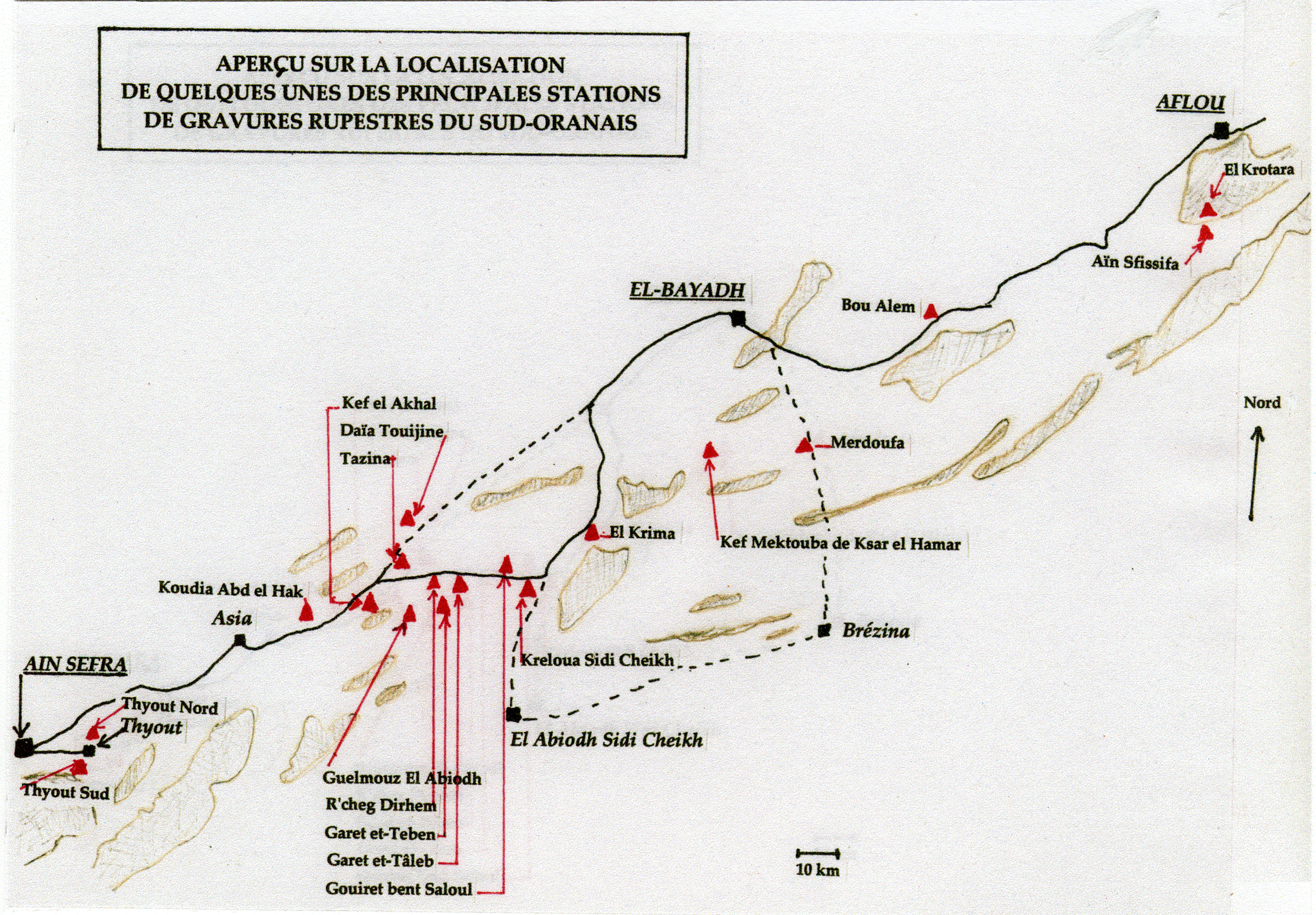
The principal localities of engravings of South Oran.

=== Localities and descriptions ===
- Figuig
- Ain Sefra
- El-Bayadh
- Aflou
- Tiaret

=== Other comparable collections of engravings ===
- Bou Saâda (Algéria)
- Djelfa (Algéria)
- Constantinois (Algéria)
- Taghit (Algéria)
- Tassili (Algéria)
- Fezzan (Libya)

== Chronology ==
=== Older classifications ===
Auguste Pomel, relying on identification of an animal which Henri Lhote believes is a hartebeest, is at the root of the position of some authors who think that the engravings belong to the Palaeolithic age.

Stéphane Gsell considered the most ancient engravings showing antelope and elephants to be Neolithic, and he distinguished from them the images of rams, which according to him reflect an Ancient Egyptian ritual, which, like the depictions of horses he attributed to the historical period.

The classification proposed by Georges-Barthélemy Médéric Flamand based on a study of techniques and patinas distinguished a first group of naturalistic engravings (buffalo, elephant, rhinoceros, rams, donkeys, horses, antelopes), a second, libyco-berber group (engravings of decadent style, little horses, camels, alphabetic characters) and two late groups (Arab inscriptions and modern graffiti).

Presumably, the pictures which Pomel, Flamand and others identify as the recently extinct buffalo species Pelorovis antiquus, is called "hartebeest" in the text of this article below.

For Hugo Obermaier there exist two sub-groups in the neolithic engravings, the older being of naturalistic style (hartebeest), the more recent of sub-naturalistic style (less elaborated and smaller-scale subjects). The cult of the ram with the sphere was, according to him, native to the populations of North Africa before having been adopted by the Egyptians.

Henri Breuil for his part distinguished three stages. In Stage I, contemporary with the end of the Capsian, he places the large hartebeest with ringed horns, the elephants, and the very style-accomplished as well as large human figures (Ksar El Amar). Stage II, which he attributes to the Lower Neolithic, brings together the large ram of Bou Alem, the hartebeest, rhinoceros, elephants and other animals in less accomplished style. The ram, for him, had not yet been domesticated but only tamed, and its cult is rather the origin than the reflex to the Egyptian belief. Stage III includes the figures in decadent style.

Raymond Vaufrey, studying the industry of flint implements found at the foot of the engraved rocks, takes the naturalistic figures to the "Neolithic of the Capsian tradition" deriving from the Neolithic of Egypt, and places them between 4200 and 2000 B.C. The ram, which he considers domesticated, is only a transposition of the Egyptian cult of Ammon and the representations of it cannot be older than 2200 B.C. For Henri Lhote however, there is not any archaeological argument which should cause one to separate the rams, supposed to be later, from the giant hartebeest, elephants or rhinoceros. Being like them of Neolithic age, they cannot derive from the Egyptian ram, and need not on that account be considered as the ancestors of a cult of which the ram of Ammon would constitute a late sequel.

== Classification of Henri Lhote ==
Henri Lhote distinguished seven series in the mural art of the South Oranian.

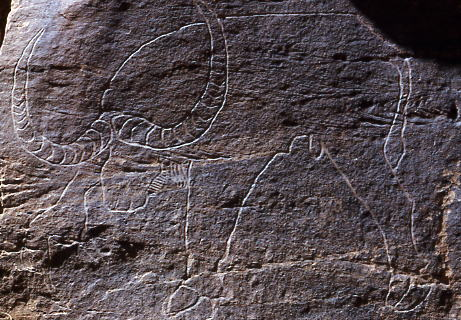
Kef el Akhal, large Hartebeest

1. Large engravings of monumental naturalistic style, or Large-scale Hartebeest style. Beside the great hartebeest, elephants and rhinoceros, Lhote placed the numerous ostriches and antelopes, boars, lions and panthers. The animals are represented absolutely in profile apart from the hartebeest, in relative profile (the two-eyed formula being frequent). Lhote placed in this ensemble the human images which accompany them (of which the hands and feet have almost always six digits). No human figure with animal head having been found, he observed that "the hartebeest ensembles of the Saharan Atlas differ from those of Tassili-n-Ajjer and of Fezzan where these figures are running. The author also thinks that the domestication of the dog was achieved in this period and that the South Oranian presents the most ancient rock testimonies to it. This first stage also includes the "mythic animals". All these engravings are made by a punctuation of little dots or hollows, more or less connected, and then most often by a polishing apparently helped by a wooden utensil with the addition of wet sand. Some engravings show a beginning of polishing in the endoperigraphic area (head), others a complete polishing.

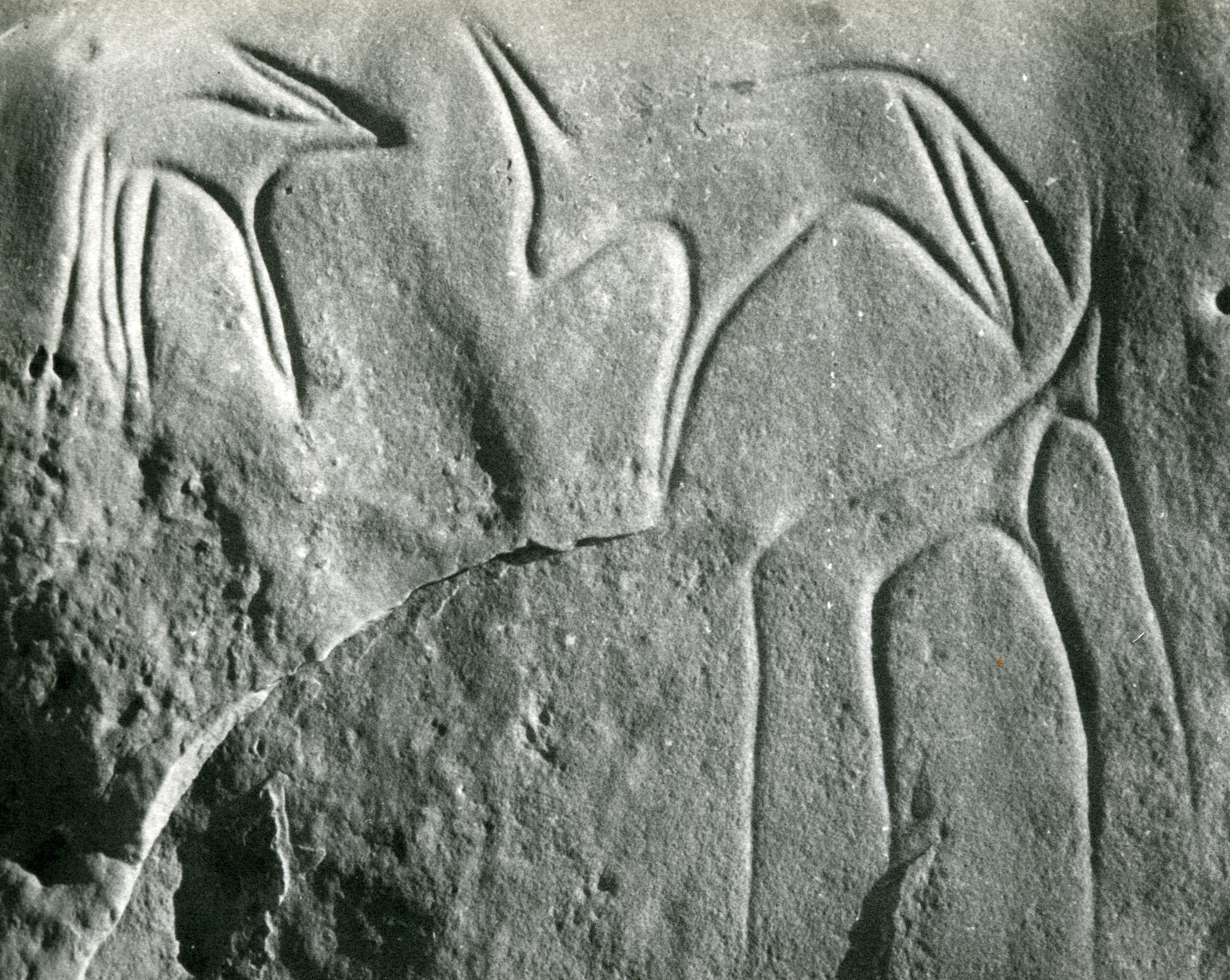
Tazina, animals in the style of the "School of Tazina"

2. Small engravings in naturalistic style, or small-scale hartebeest stage. The stage would be constituted by the collection of engravings of more reduced size, of which the style has been designated as "School of Tazina" after the name of one of the sites. These naturalistic images show the same fauna (hartebeest, elephant and rhinoceros) as those of the preceding group but in very conventionalised forms, the legs and tails of the animals being very thinned out, the lines of the horns and the muzzle prolonged in a 'fantastic' way (Flamand), the lengthening of the body, the hind-quarters and the heads having inspired faulty identifications. The style is however not uniform and on certain murals these characteristic deformations co-exist with more realistic depictions. From a technical standpoint the finish of the engravings is regular, no trace surviving of a preliminary dotting-out, and the patina is similar to that of the preceding stage. The human depictions show the same character but the terminal parts of the limbs, hands and feet are generally rounded-off.

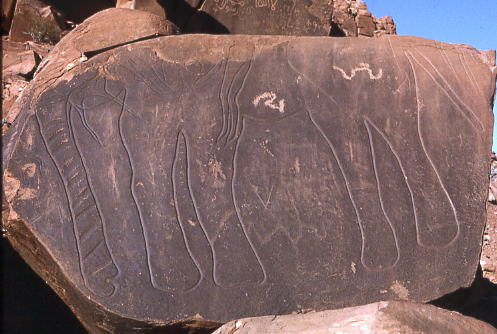
Koudia Abd El Hak, superimposed engravings.

From a chronological viewpoint, a single station (Koudiat Abd El Hak) shows an indisputable over-drawing, a little antelope with attenuated legs being overdrawn by a large elephant, although another would appear to be later than it. This fact obliged Lhote "to ask himself if the small-scale school might be earlier than that of the large engravings, or even if the two schools might have been contemporary." This latter hypothesis would have implied the existence "of two different gatherings of humans living side by side or, at the least, two artistic schools operating in parallel."

In his analysis Lhote shows that beyond the great similarity of the fauna represented and of the presence of the "orant-ram" association in both stages, the "orant-hartebeest" association was not indicated in the second, whereas the antelopes there are more numerous and the lions rarer. He adds that "the small-scale style extends towards the south Moroccan as far as the Rio de Oro, although the large-scale style remained confined in the south oran area, with certain migrations towards the north-east." The author's opinion therefore leans therefore towards the existence of two groups. Furthermore, the style of the small-scale art, by comparison with the static forms of the large-scale figures, reflects "rather an art which has already attained conventional formulae", "more advanced in the sense of a more evolved creative impulse" and therefore later. But in this hypothesis one should be able to rediscover traces of this so distinctive style in the later group of the decadent engravings, even though these seem, to the contrary, to derive from the large-scale school. In his conclusions the author considers that the small-scale engravings, often thought of as later decadent reminiscences, would be as old as those of the large hartebeest and elephants. "Whichever solution may prevail", concluded Lhote, one should consider that the identity of the fauna in each of the two groups indicates that there could not have been a great lapse of time between them, and that, despite the variation of styles, one can ask oneself if they do not represent two expressions of one and the same art."

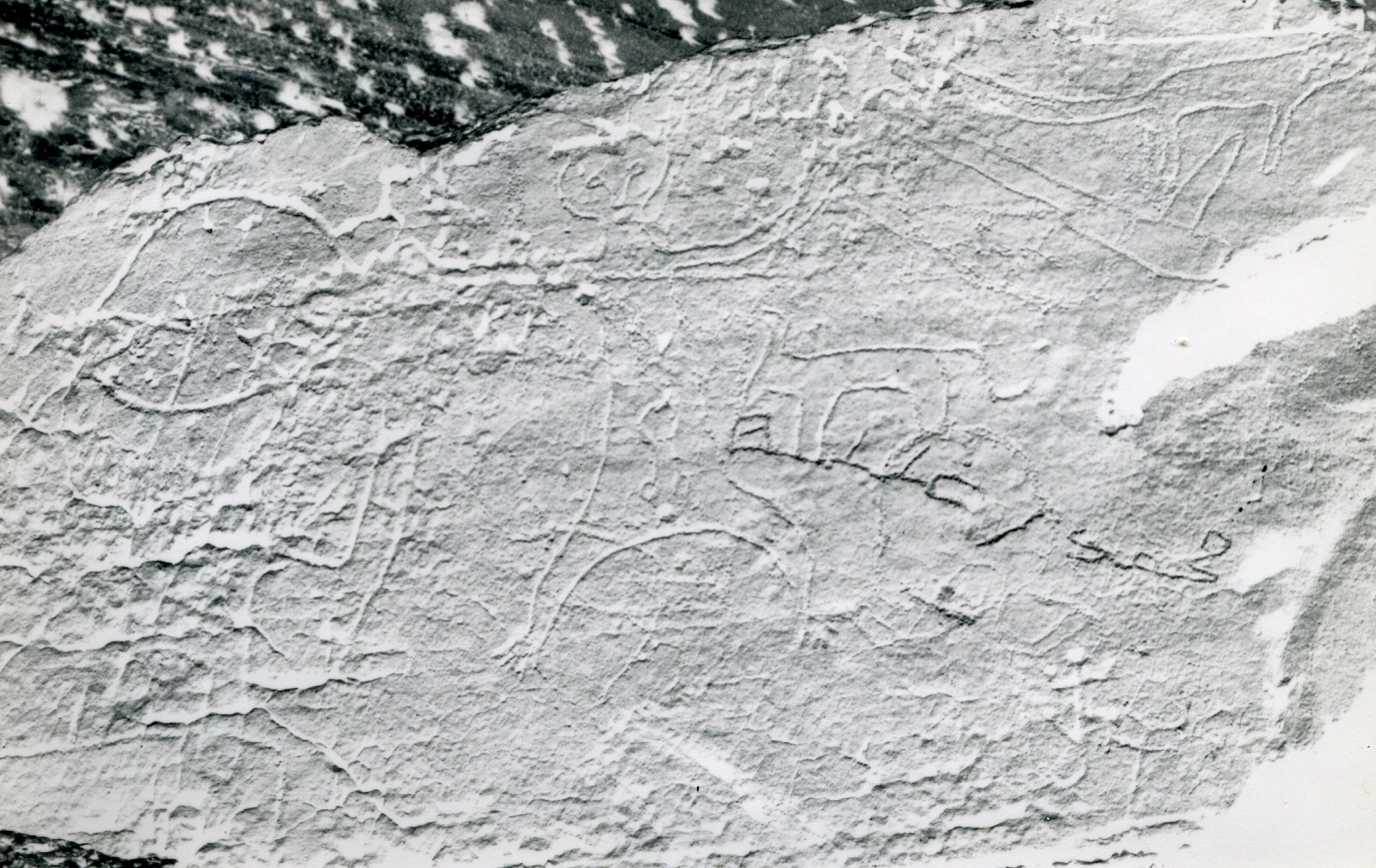
Gouiret bent Saloul, human figure sexually displayed, with axe and shield

3. Engravings of sub-naturalistic style or decadent hartebeest stage. These are characterized by the mediocrity of their style and technique, reduced to a fairly clumsy dotting and an irregular final polishing. Their patina is clearer than for the two preceding stages, an observation confirmed by the fact that they are often found on the same murals. Their dimensions are more reduced than the first group, but larger than those of the second, with which they have nothing in common. The most common theme is of sexually displayed human figures, in a semi-crouching position, seen frontally, often together with numerous lions and ostriches. The fauna, less varied than in the two first groups, still includes the last representations of hartebeest of which the horns are not always ringed, and images of elephants, cattle and panthers. The association of man-ram disappears, which seems "to mark a rupture on the environment of the foregoing stages and shows an evolution of religious beliefs", replaced by the man-lion association, hartebeest and elephants no longer holding the place which they had formerly occupied. It is, according to Lhote, "the end, very degraded, of that remarkable artistic epoch of the south Oranian.

4. Engravings of the sub-naturalist style of the husbandmen or the bovidian stage.

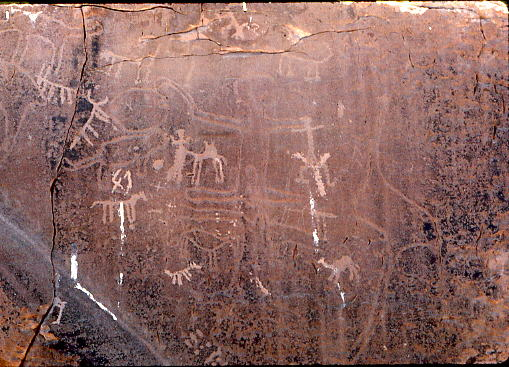
Gouiret bent Saloul.

The domestic cow with long or short horns sometimes wearing little spheres dominates this stage, the fauna being composed otherwise of elephants, antelope and ostriches, while images of humans are rare. The engravings are in various different styles, the formula schematic and massive, called "quadrangular" by H. Breuil, seeming like the most ancient. The main group of these engravings are not found in south Oran but in the valley of the Saoura (Sahara): Lhote supposes "a different origin to that of the preceding groups", showing "secondary infiltrations which have come from the south." For the author, "this bovidian civilization has certainly emerged from a Saharan milieu, but it has only made a very superficial appearance in the south Oran," following the tracks from the Hills of Ksour, having perhaps "another direct contact with the Sahara in the region of Brésina."

5. Engravings of schematic carriages, which ought to occupy a comparable chronological position to that of the carriages of the Sahara.

6. Libyco-Berber engravings.

7. Modern Arabo-Berber engravings.

== Other views ==
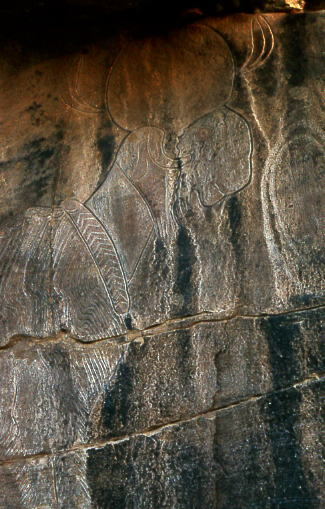
Bou Alem, the largest ram.

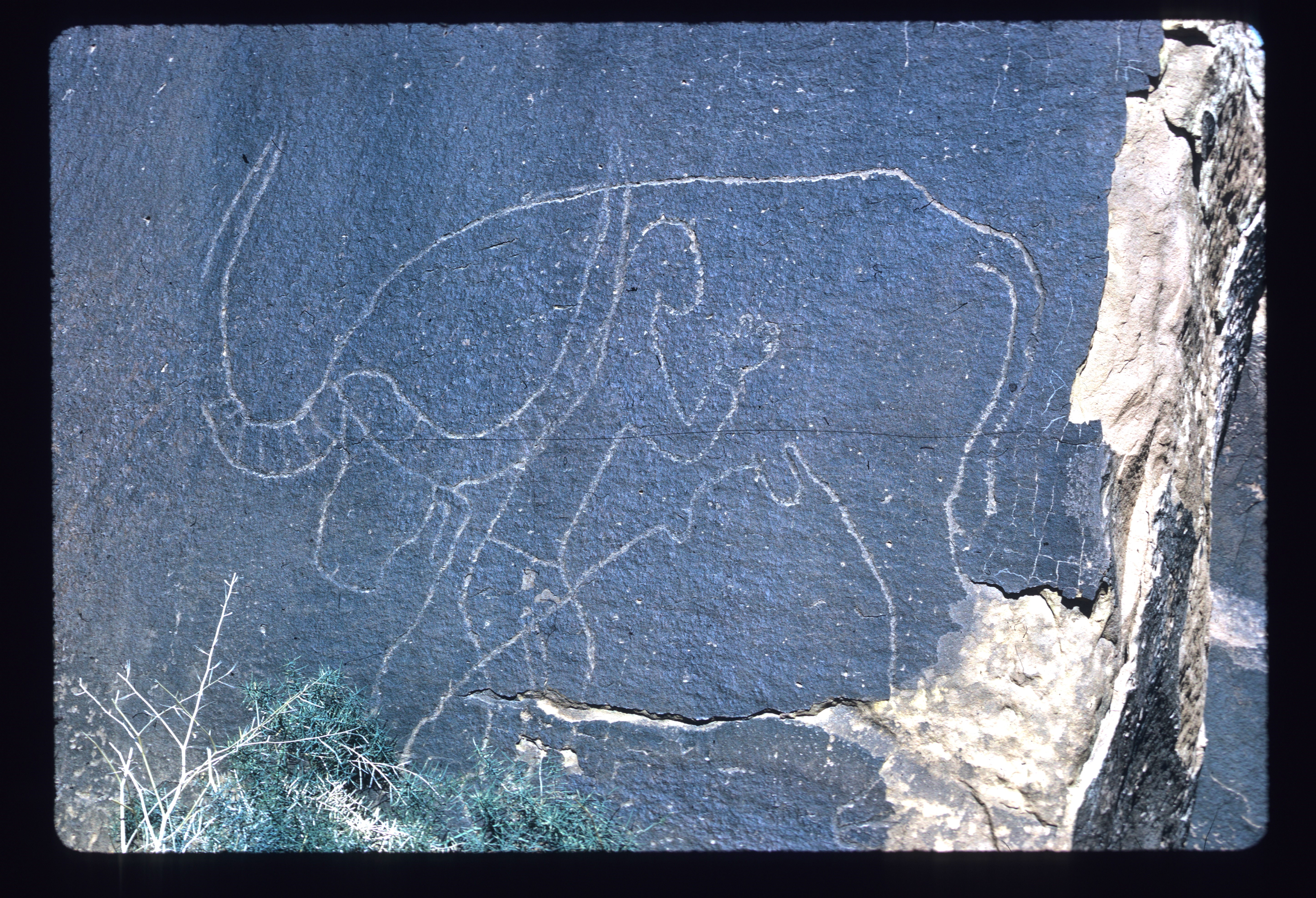
R'cheg Dirhem, hartebeest and human.

For F. Cominardi, analysing most recently the superimposition of engravings at "Koudiat Abd el Hak", it seems accepted that the naturalistic large-scale stage and the naturalistic small-scale stage (the most ancient level being constituted of very tiny engravings, the most recent by works of slightly superior execution) were contemporary, at least within a single epoch, "the first not being extinguished before the second began." The author leans, "on account of the arguments of the more evolved schematic style, towards placing the naturalistic large-scale stage in the first place, and to making the naturalistic small-scale stage begin before the disappearance of the former."

According to F. Cominardi, "It would be during the lapse of time while they coexisted, that the engravings of the plaque of Koudiat were made. Were these two so differentiated artistic worlds brought into being by different peoples? It is possible. It could be explained that they dwelt rarely together on the same rocks, and that the school of Tazina should be so individualized geographically." "If the small-scale naturalistic stage is, by comparison with the older stage, if not contemporary, at least starting to unfold during that time, one could, provisionally, place it between the 6th and the 4th millennium."

== Interpretation ==
Henri Lhote identified among the south Oran engravings 41 images of rams or of sheep-like creatures, which is comparatively few in the sum of the representations, "especially as this figure includes small scale images and the uncertain ones of the decadent school." Their symbolic attributes (spheroids, manes, collars) remain very variable, in contrast to those of the Egyptian ram of Ammon, which was furnished right from the start with the symbols which it would always keep, one could claim, according to the author, that they had not yet been fixed in a definitive fashion and we find ourselves here looking at a cult which was just beginning to take form." The difference "shows, if it were still necessary to show, that the South Oranians had not adopted the cult from Egypt.

In 13 cases the engraved rams are associated with human figures. Analyzing their possible relations, the author's conclusion is "that the Ram played a religious role of first importance to the south-Oranians, that its association with man, though he may have been in a praying position, should have been armed with an axe, shows that it certainly had the character of a divinity which one would ask things of and which one might, on suitable occasions, sacrifice." This role, he adds, "is well attested in the two hartebeest stages of large and small scale, but disappears in the age of the decadent style where nothing of it remains except the mere vestige."

The representations of hartebeest, more numerous (73 for the region) and in 13 cases associated with the presence of a human, show despite the absence of the spheroid "which may have been the object of rites associating it with men," that it "held an eminent place in the beliefs of the ancient populations of the South Oranians. As for the lion, represented with facing head in the old hartebeest stage where it is only a single time associated with a man, but shown in profile in the decadent style where its associations with humans are on the contrary quite frequent, it seems to have replaced hartebeest and rams. One should be able, according to Lhote, "to interpret this phenomenon as a radical modification in the behaviour of south Oranians, a real change, unless it represents the arrival of new human populations."

For Henri Lhote, "the south Oran engravings are certainly among the oldest artistic and cultic manifestations of Africa which we know of, and the beliefs of which they are the reflection may perhaps have helped to influence the later populations of the Nile valley and of black Africa where animism was to undergo so great a development."

== Who were the artists? ==
Conjectures on the identities of the artists have been many. Lhote tells that some have believed them to belong to the black populations ancestral to the Mandinka and the Hausas. But the Tuareg, the Egyptians and the ancestors of the Berbers have also been invoked. They have also been thought to have been the Cro-Magnons, the husbandmen and farmers of Asiatic origin, the Harratines, the Proto-Libyans and the Bushmen. In the absence of discoveries in the region of neolithic human remains and of an adequate understanding of the ambiguity of the images, "one should avoid any absolute identification" or "definitive option".

== Gallery ==
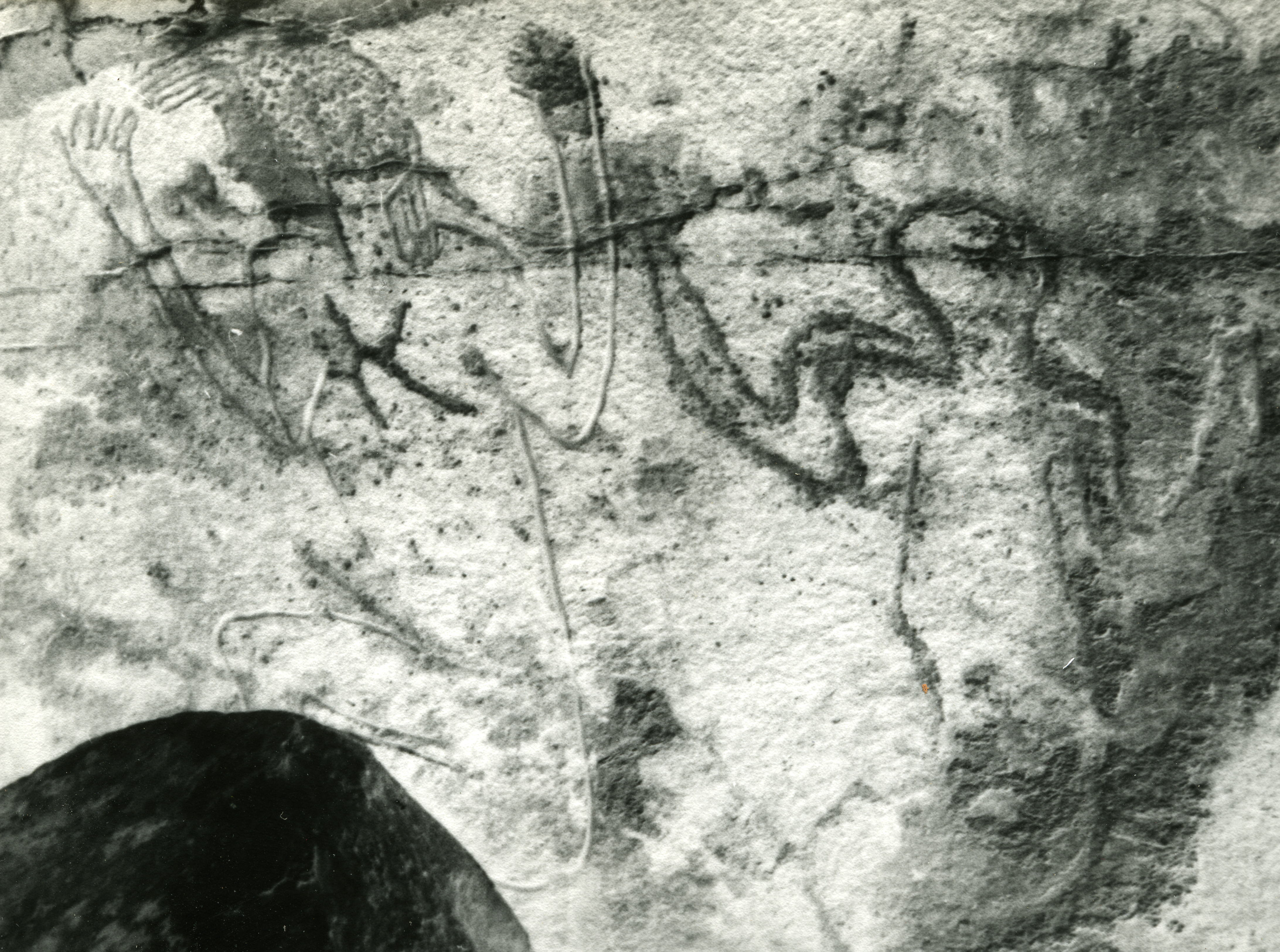
R'cheg Dirhem, two human figures

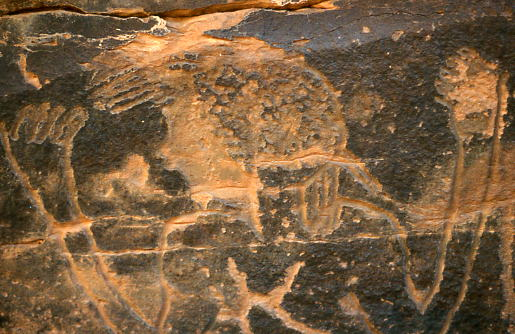
R'cheg Dirhem (detail)

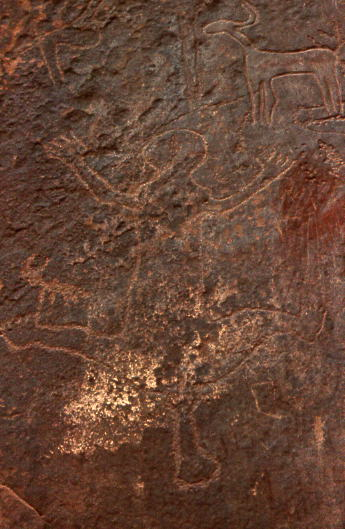
Guelmouz el Abiodh

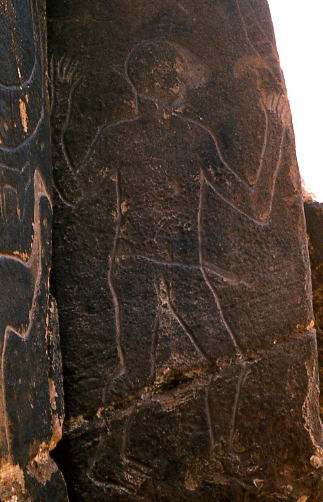
Kef Mektouba of Ksar el Hamar

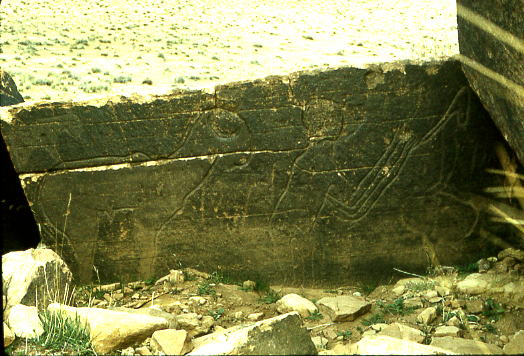
Kef Mektouba of Ksar el Hamar, man and ram

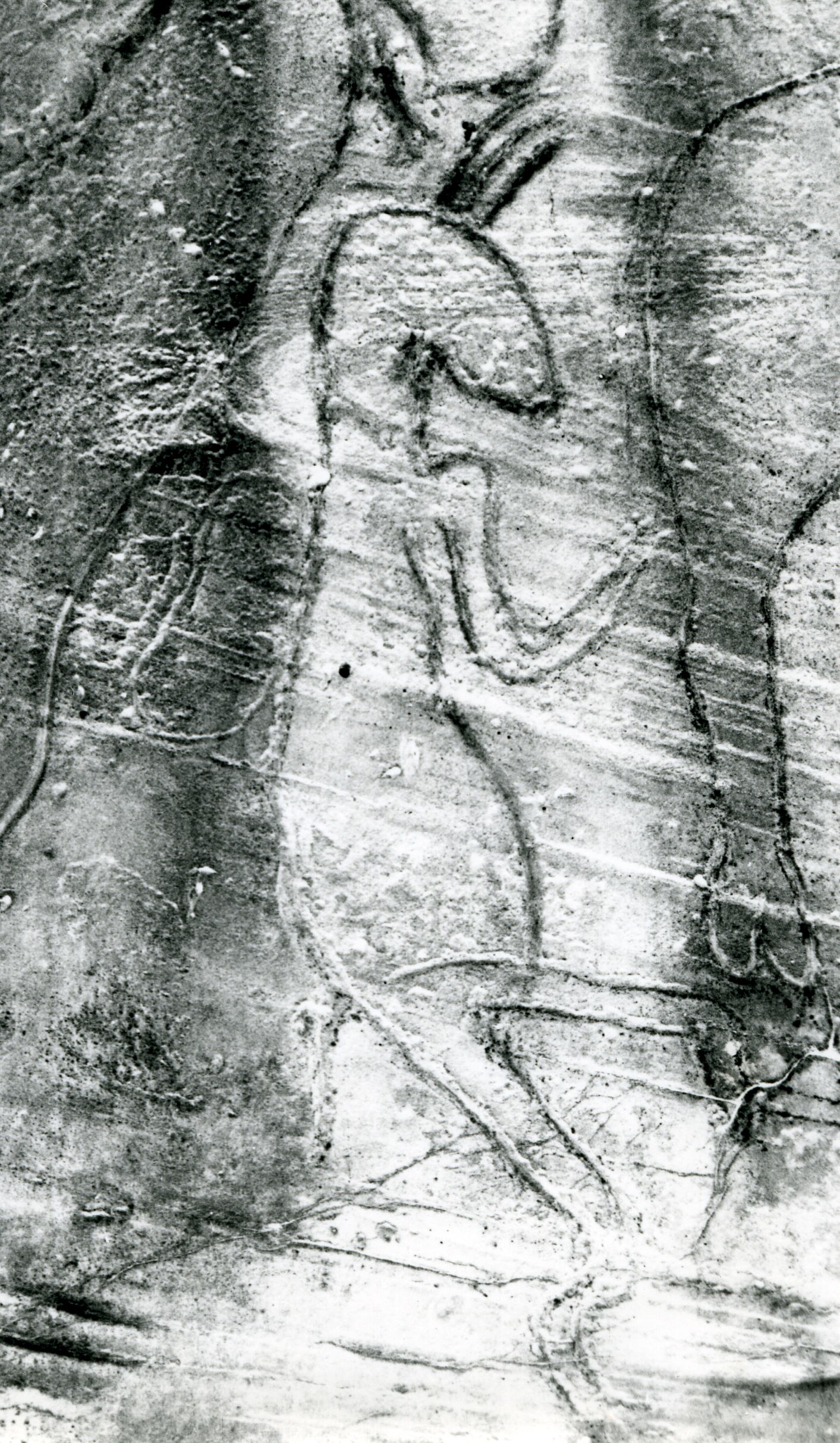
Kreloua Sidi Cheikh, human

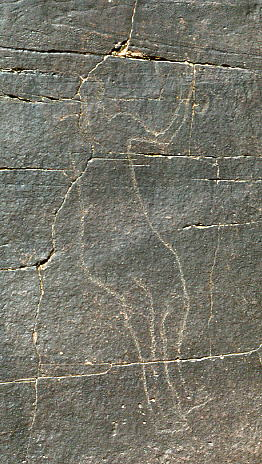
Kreloua Sidi Cheikh, human

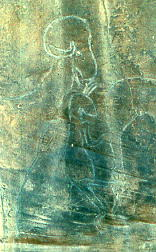
Kreloua Sidi Cheikh, the same human

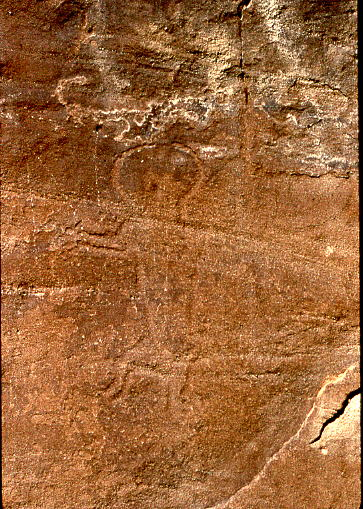
Merdoufa

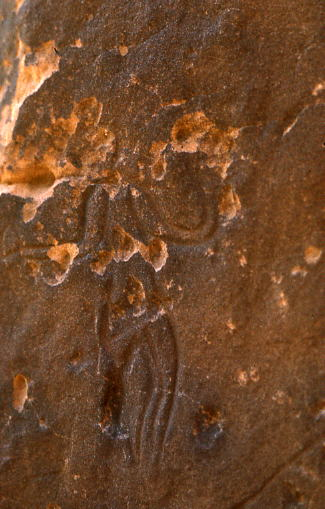
Merdoufa

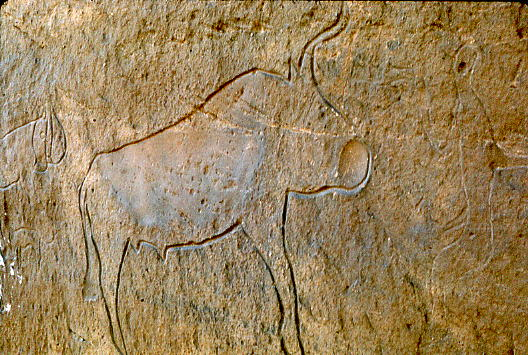
Merdoufa (Human to the right)

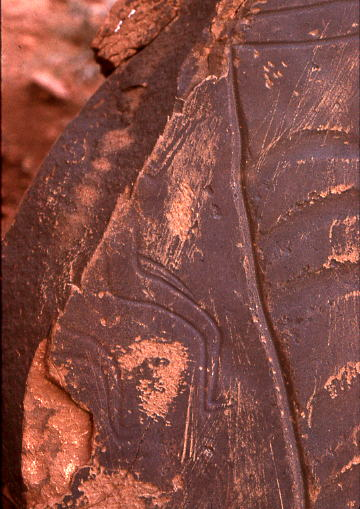
Merdoufa (Human silhouette)

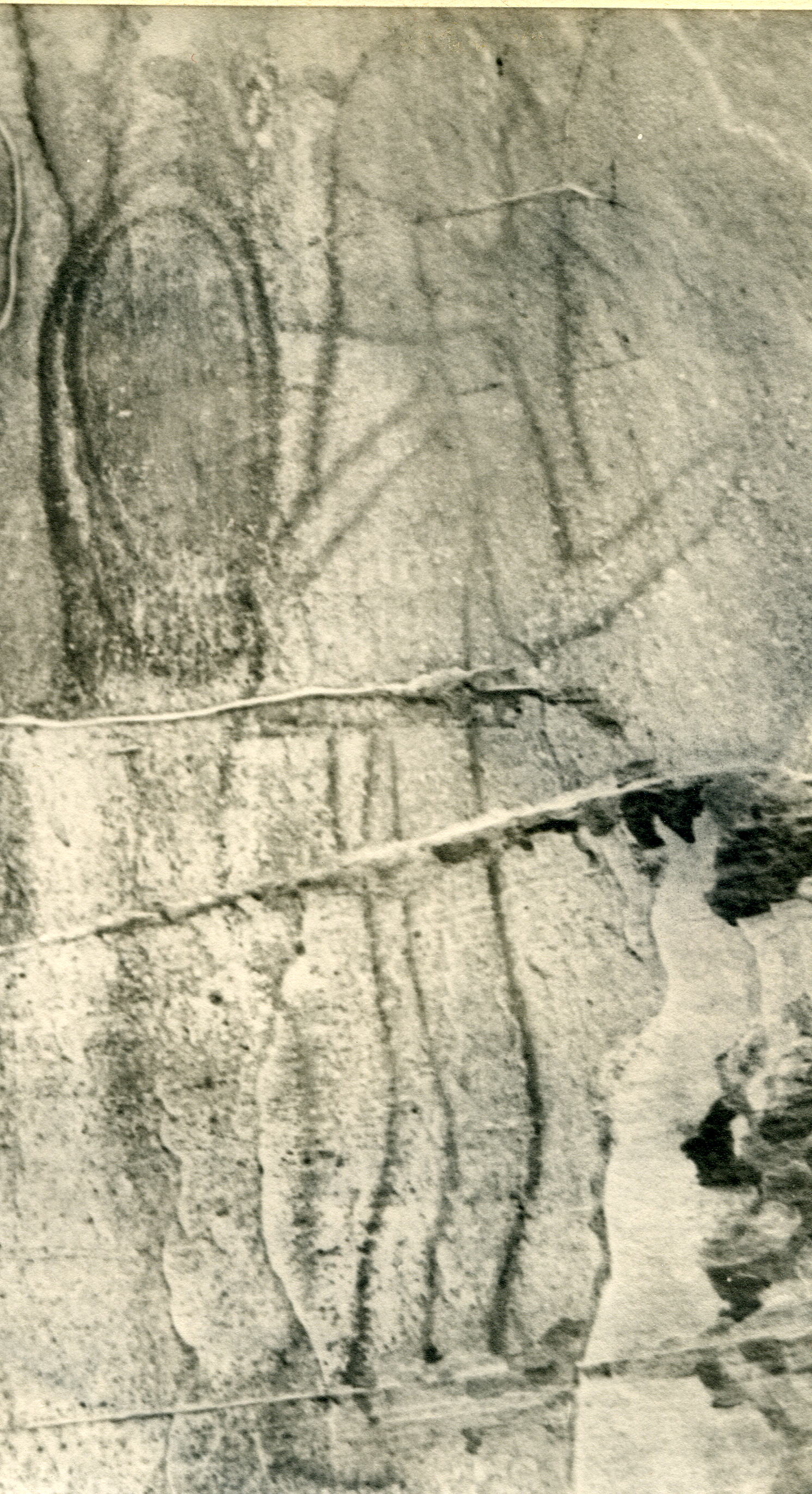
Bou Alem, human

== See also ==
- Rock art
- Neolithic
- Prehistoric art
- List of Stone Age art
- Tassili du Hoggar
- Draa River
- Hugo Obermaier
- Leo Frobenius
- Rock engravings of Oued Djerat

== Selected bibliography ==
- Aumassip (Ginette), Trésors de l'Atlas, Alger, Entreprise nationale du Livre, 1986.
- Balout (L.), Préhistoire de l'Afrique du Nord, Paris, A.M.G., 1955 (544 p., 29 fig.)
- Breuil (H.) et Frobenius (L.), L'Afrique, Cahiers d'Art, numéro spécial, Paris, 1931 (122 p.)
- Flamand (G.B.M.), Les Pierres écrites, Paris, Masson, 1921 (434 p., 22 fig., 53 pl.)
- Frobenius (L.) et Obermaier (H.), Haschra Maktuba, Munich, Kurt Wolff, 1925 (62 p., 6 cartes, 160 pl.)
- Gautier (E.F.), Sahara algérien, Paris, A. Colin, 1908 (371 p., 61 fig., 52 pl.)
- Lhote (Henri), Les Gravures rupestres du Sud-oranais, Arts et Métiers graphiques, Paris, 1970.
- Vaufrey (Raymond), L'Art rupestre nord-africain, Paris, Masson, 1939 (127 p., 58 fig. 54 pl.)
- Vaufrey (Raymond), Préhistoire de l'Afrique, tome II, Au nord et à l'est de la grande forêt, Tunis, Service des Publications et échanges de l'Université de Tunis, 1969 (372 p.), pp. 143–149.
