= Malika Hachid =

Algerian anthropologist and prehistorian (born 1954)

- Born: March 1954 (age 72); Algiers
- Citizenship: Algeria
- Occupations: Prehistorian; archaeologist
- Known for: Identifying forged prehistoric rock art

Malika Hachid (Arabic: مليكة حشيد; born March 1954) is an Algerian archaeologist and prehistorian, who is notable for her research on cave art in Algeria and her work on the prehistory of the Berbers. She was Director of the National Centre for Prehistoric, Anthropological and Historical Research (CNRPAH).

== Biography ==
Hachid was born in Algiers in March 1954. In 1974, she moved to Aix-en-Provence in order to study prehistoric archaeology. In 1982, she returned to Algeria and began work as research director at the National Centre for Prehistoric, Anthropological and Historical Research (CNRPAH). In 1987, she became director of the Tassili des Ajjer National Cultural Park. She was a founding member and vice-president of the Sonatrach-Tassili Foundation.

Hachid's research explores the early history of the Berber people, as well as prehistoric cave art found in Algeria. In particular she has studied the cave art 'discovered' by Henri Lhote at Tassili-n-ajjer, as well as the relationship between Lhote and his mentor Abbé Breuil. In 1998, Hachid was able to confirm that a number of the artworks which Lhote had based his controversial interpretations of the site on were fakes, which had been created by French members of his own team. After the publication of her book on the site, further forgeries were revealed to Hachid by members of the team. Hachid has also been outspoken about the irreparable damage done by Lhote and his team to the art, by wetting the works in order to photograph them, which led to a great reduction in the vibrancy of the colours. Hachid has identified some of the figures as being of both Mediterranean and black African origin. In her work on the proto-history of the Berbers, Hachid has argued that it two civilizations, the Capsian and Mechtoid, combined to form the first Berbers 10–11,000 years ago. She believes that Berber identity formed in North Africa.

== Publications ==
- El-Hadjra el-Mektouba. Les pierres écrites de l'Atlas saharien (1992).
- Le Tassili des Ajjer. Aux sources de l'Afrique 50 siècles avant les pyramides (1998).
- Les Premiers Berbères entre Méditerranée, Tassili et Nil, ed. Edisud (2001).
