= Hugo Obermaier =

Spanish-German historian and anthropologist (1877–1946)

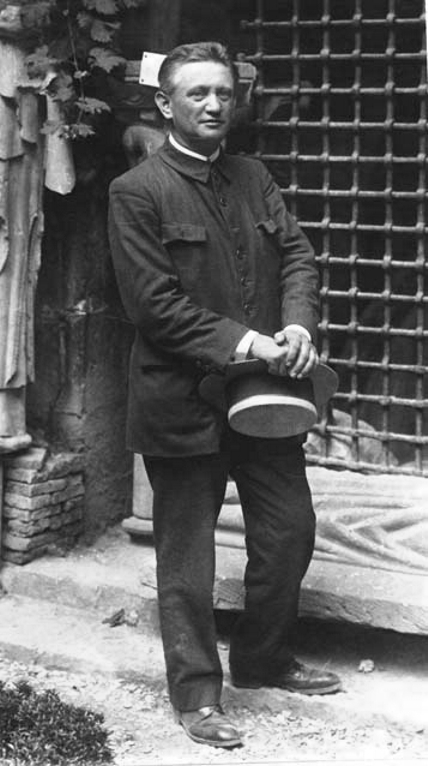
Hugo Obermaier in Pamplona

Hugo Obermaier (29 January 1877, in Regensburg – 12 November 1946, in Fribourg) was a distinguished Spanish-German prehistorian and anthropologist who taught at various European centres of learning. Although he was born in Germany, he was later naturalized as a Spanish citizen in 1924. He is particularly associated with his work on the diffusion of mankind in Europe during the Ice Age, and in connection with north Spanish cave art, and resisted placing his science at the disposal of nationalistic and racialist interests in the Germany of the 1930s.

== Career ==
Hugo Obermaier spent his childhood and the early part of his student years in Regensburg. In 1900 he was ordained as a diocesan priest and between 1901 and 1904 he studied in Vienna the subjects of Prehistoric archaeology, physical geography, geology, palaeontology, ethnology, German philology and human anatomy. Among his teachers at this time the most important were Albrecht Penck, Josef Szombathy and Moritz Hoernes. In 1904, he gained a doctorate with a dissertation on The Diffusion of Humankind during the Ice Age in Middle Europe. Four years later, he qualified as a lecturer and in 1909, despite opposition from Albrecht Penck, his former teacher, he became an unsalaried university lecturer in Vienna. In 1911 he took up a professorial post at the newly founded Institute of Human Palaeontology in Paris, which he held until the outbreak of the First World War. In that period he was working with Wernert and Henri Breuil at the caves of El Castillo and the Cueva de La Pasiega in Cantabria. While in Spain (1914) he next decided to work at the National Museum of Natural Sciences in Madrid, but changing again in 1922 to a professorship at the Complutense University in Madrid. He dug at the Cave of Altamira in 1924-5, and collaborated with Breuil in their publication in 1935. His work with Frobenius included the study of the Neolithic rock engravings of south Oran in 1925.

Scientific, personal and political considerations were the cause for his refusal to go back to Germany when, in 1933, he declined the invitation to take up the Max Ebert Chair in Berlin. After the outbreak of the civil war, in 1939 he left there to take up a Professorship in Fribourg in Switzerland. Hugo Obermaier died after a long illness in the Theological hostel in Fribourg.

== Hugo Obermaier Society ==
The scientific contributions of H. Obermaier lay primarily in research into the Old Stone Age, which he was one of the first to recognise as being a field for serious scientific research. In order to pay respect to his memory and equally to advance scientific investigations into the Palaeolithic, on 23 June 1951 archaeologists, geologists, palaeontologists and anthropologists formed a society led by Lothar Zotz. In 1956 the name "Hugo Obermaier Society for Research into the Ice Age and the Stone Age" was adopted.

== Selected publications ==
- (with Franz Xaver Kießling) 'Das Plateaulehm-Paläolithikum des nordöstlichen Waldviertels von Niederösterreich' Mitteilungen der Anthropologischen Gesellschaft in Wien 41, 1911, p. 51ff.
- Der Mensch der Vorzeit. (Allgemeine Verlags-GmbH Berlin, München & Wien) (no year - about 1912).
- (with Henri Breuil & H. Alcalde Del Río) La Pasiega à Puente Viesgo, Ed. A. Chêne (Mónaco, 1913).
- (with Leo Frobenius) Hadschra Maktuba. Urzeitliche Felsbilder Kleinafrikas. Part 1 (of 6). (Kurt Wolff Pantheon-Verlag für Kunstwissenschaft Florenz, Pantheon und München, 1925).
- (with Carl Walter Heiss) Iberische Prunk-Keramik vom Elche-Archena-Typus. (1929)
- (with Herbert Kühn), Buschmannkunst. Felsmalereien aus Südafrika. Edited from the researches of Reinhard Maak. (Kurt Wolff Pantheon-Verlag für Kunstwissenschaft Florenz, Pantheon und München, 1930).
- (with Joseph Bernhart) Sinn der Geschichte. Eine Geschichtstheologie. (Herder, Freiburg i. Br. 1931).
- (with Henri Breuil) The Cave of Altamira at Santillana del Mar, Spain (Madrid, 1935).
- El Hombre fosil. (New Edition) (Colegio Universitario de Ediciones Istmo Madrid, 1985).

== See also ==
- List of Roman Catholic cleric–scientists
