= Ginette Aumassip =

French geologist, archeologist and anthropologist

Ginette Aumassip (26 March 1931 – 7 January 2025) was a French geologist and specialist in African prehistory. She was the director of the Laboratory for Research on Africa under the auspices of CNRS. She taught African prehistory at various universities and, from 1970 to 1986, ran the scholarly journal Libyca. A resident of Algiers, she also researched the origins of the earliest settlers of Algeria.

She conducted numerous archaeological investigations in the Sahara, including major excavations in the Bas Sahara and in Tassili n'Ajjer. These allowed her to identify various local cultures, locate them in space and time, and follow their evolution and adaptation to an increasingly arid environment. Her work focused on understanding Saharan populations and the settlement of North Africa.

She wrote several books on the prehistory of the Sahara. She died on January 7, 2025.

== Publications ==
- Le Bas-Sahara dans la préhistoire ( 1 September 1986)
- Chronologies de l'art rupestre saharien et nord africain (1993)
- L'Algérie Des Premiers Hommes (2001)
- Préhistoire du Sahara et de ses abords : Tome 1, Au temps des chasseurs : Le Paléolithique (1 February 2004)
- Préhistoire du Sahara et de ses abords: Tome 2 - Le Neolithique ou le temps des producteurs (25 July 2019)
