= Aflou =

Aflou Aflu / ⴰⴼⵍⵓ / أفلو
- Commune and town
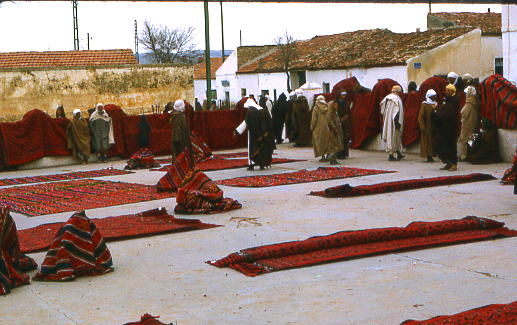
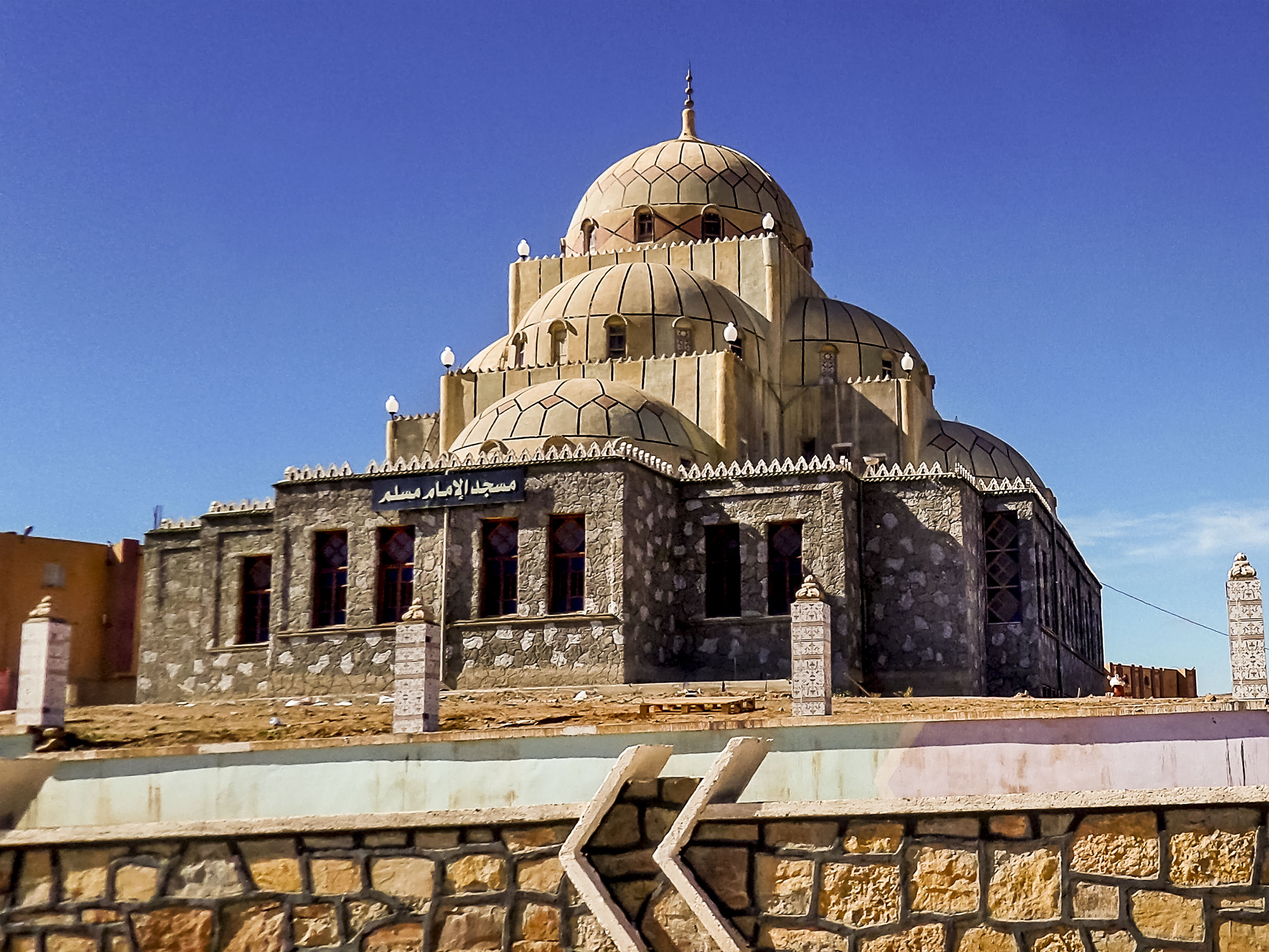
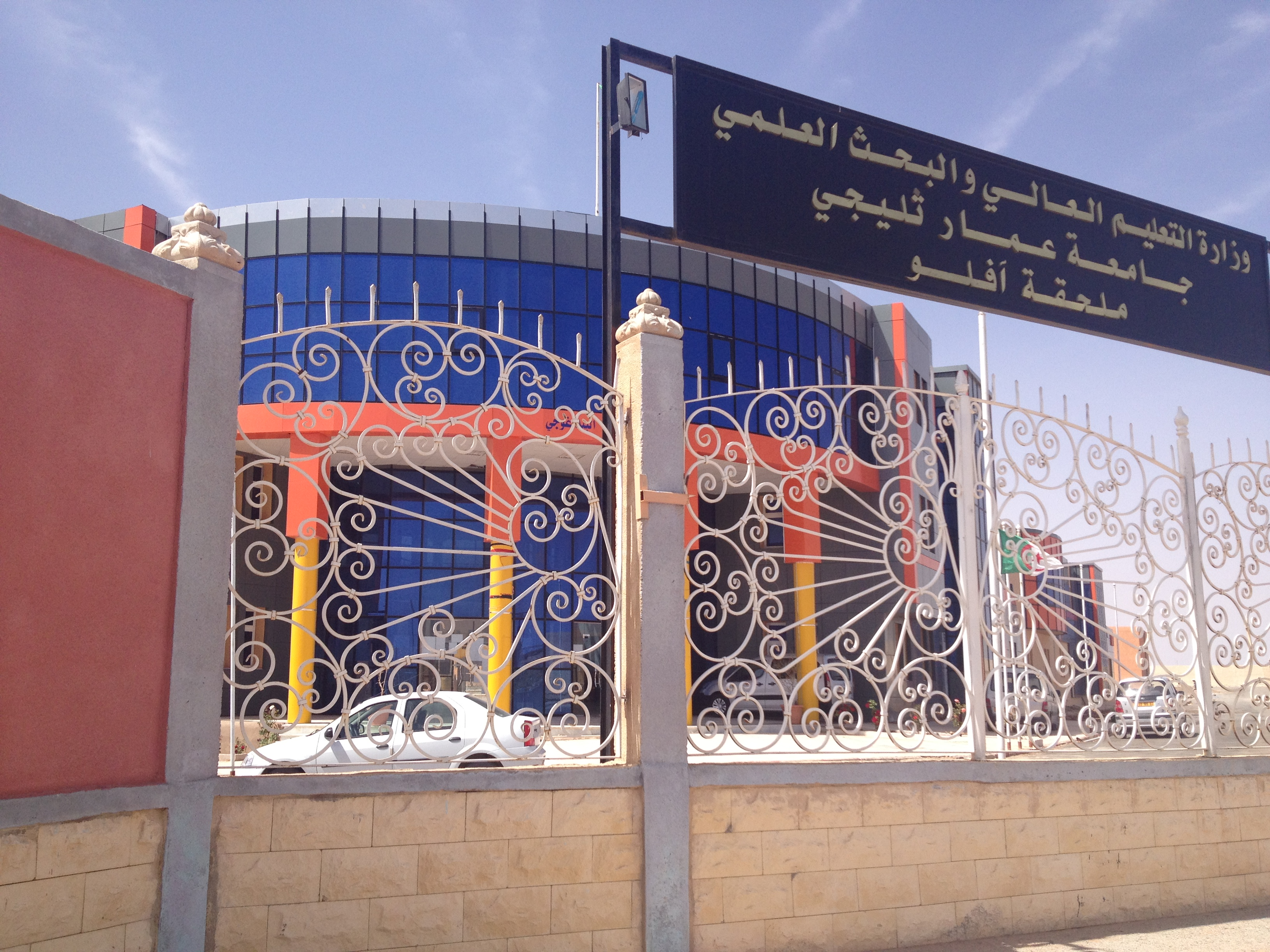
- Clockwise from top: Marketplace, Aflou University, Imam Muslim Mosque

- Coordinates: 34°6′32″N 2°6′7″E
- Country: Algeria
- Province: Aflou Province
- District: Aflou

Population (2008)
  - Total: 102,025
- Time zone: UTC+1 (CET)

Aflou (Berber language: Aflu, Arabic: أفلو) is a town and commune in Alfou Province, Algeria. It is located in the Amour Range of the Saharan Atlas, at an elevation of 1,426 m (4,678 ft), which makes it one of the highest towns in Algeria. Aflou is the capital of Alfou Province and Aflou District. Its population in 1998 was 48,000.

== Localities of the commune ==
The commune of Aflou is composed of 6 localities:

- Ville d'Aflou
- el amour
- El Frachiche
- Béni Moukha
- Rahmania
- Ouled Sidi Bouabdallah
- Ouled Sidi Khaled
