= Henri Lhote =

French explorer, ethnographer, and discoverer of prehistoric cave art

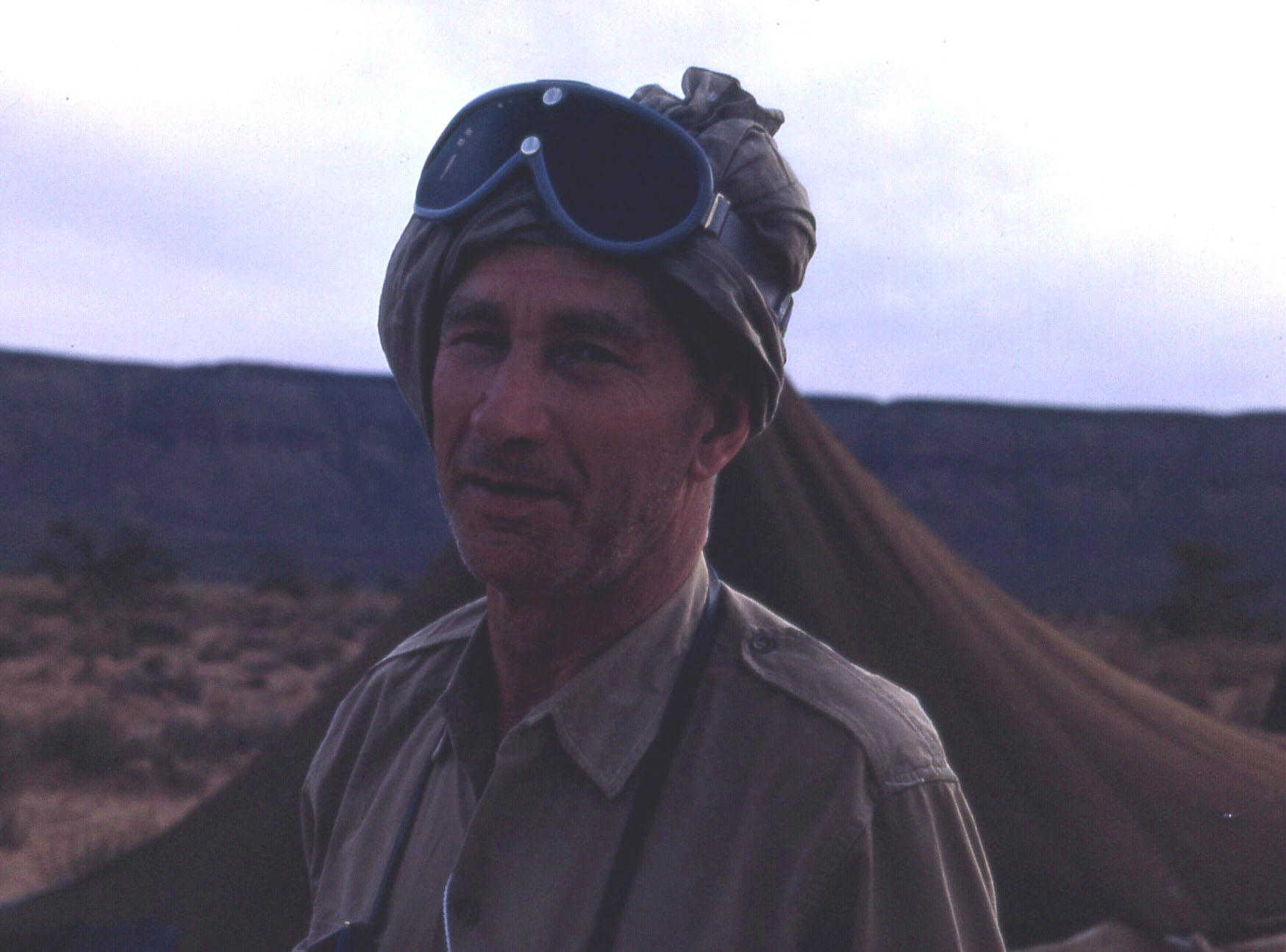
- Lhote in Mauritania in 1967
- Born: 16 March 1903; Paris, France
- Died: 26 March 1991 (aged 88); Saint-Aignan, Loir-et-Cher, France

Henri Lhote (16 March 1903 – 26 March 1991) was a French explorer, ethnographer, and discoverer of prehistoric cave art. He is credited with the discovery of an assembly of 800 or more works of primitive art in a remote region of Algeria on the edge of the Sahara desert. He was aided by the local Tuareg guide Jebrine Ag Mohamed Machar.

Lhote came to believe the paintings testified to ancient contact with extraterrestrial beings and is considered one of the early proponents of paleocontact.

== Biography ==
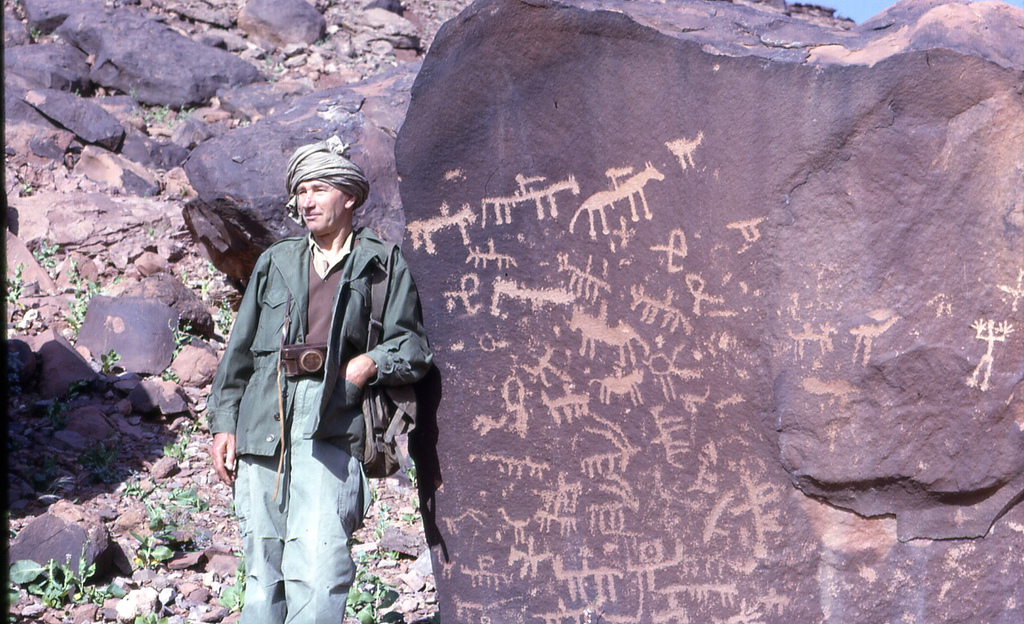
In this 1967 photo, Henri Lhote poses next to rock art in the Sahara Desert of Mauritania.

Lhote was orphaned at age 12 and subsequently became a boy scout, where he learned about anthropology. He was largely self-taught until he became a pupil and protégé of Abbé Breuil, a great expert on prehistoric cave art in France. He began to do fieldwork in anthropology in 1929 but his work was often contested due to his lack of credentials. In 1945, at the age of 42, he finally obtained a doctorate under the direction of Marcel Griaule. He led unsuccessful expeditions to Hoggar and Teffedest Mountains in 1949–1950.

=== Discovery of Tassili ===
Lhote met and befriended a French soldier named Charles Brennans who had discovered rock paintings and engravings in a remote, uninhabited zone on the edge of the Sahara desert, while on an exploratory mission there in the 1930s. The artwork was on sandstone cliffs in a deep wadi of a barren plateau known as Tassili-n-ajjer, and included depictions of elephants, giraffes, rhinoceroses, and strange human figures.

With the help of Brennans, and with financial support from the Musée de l'Homme in Paris, Lhote mounted an expedition to investigate. They landed in Djanet in February 1956 and made their way over land to Tassili. Lhote later wrote that he had never seen anything "so extraordinary, so original, so beautiful" as the art at Tassili n'Ajjer. Over 16 months in 1956 and 1957 Lhote and his associates discovered about 800 paintings, many of which he documented with the aid of painters and photographers. These images were presented in 1957 and 1958 at the Musée des Arts Décoratifs in Paris and were, in the opinion of the writer and politician André Malraux, "one of the most defining exhibitions of the mid-century".

Lhote mounted three subsequent expeditions to Tassili between 1958 and 1962.

=== Ancient astronauts ===
In his book The Search for the Tassili Frescoes: The story of the prehistoric rock-paintings of the Sahara (1958), Lhote publicized the hypothesis that the humanoid drawings at Tassili represented space aliens. He baptized one particularly large and curious figure "Jabbaren" and described him as the "great Martian god." The popular press gave a lot of attention to this hypothesis of a prehistoric close encounter, and Lhote's arguments were later incorporated into the evidence assembled by Erich von Däniken for the thesis that ancient extraterrestrial astronauts visited the Earth in prehistoric times.

However, mainstream scientists regard the "great Martian god" and other rock art figures of Tassili as representations of ordinary humans in ritual masks and costumes rather than extraterrestrial lifeforms. For instance a dance scene that Lhote discovered in 1956 can be attributed on stylistic grounds to Neolithic hunters who lived in the area (which was then fertile) around 6,000 to 8,000 years ago.

=== Re-evaluation ===
In 2003, the British anthropologist Jeremy Keenan undertook a review of Lhote's publications and concluded that "many of the claims of the expedition's leader, Henri Lhote, were misleading, a number of the paintings were faked, and the copying process was fraught with errors." Keenan also found that the political context of French colonization of Algeria had influenced the treatment of the site and the interpretation of the artworks. In particular he singled out Abbé Breuil as "the arch-advocate of foreign influence in African rock art." He alleged that the expedition's methods caused damage to the rock art and "sterilized the archaeological landscape".

== Namesakes ==
The "Ouan Lhote Area" and the "Henri Lhote Arch" in Tassili National Park are named after him.

A species of North African lizard, Philochortus lhotei, was named in his honour.

== Selected publications ==
- Aux prises avec le Sahara, (Les œuvres françaises, Paris, 1936).
- Le Sahara, désert mystérieux, (Editions Bourrelier, Paris, 1937; 1949).
- L'extraordinaire aventure des Peuls. Présence Africaine. Paris. Oct.-Nov. 1959. pp. 48–57
- Les Touaregs du Hoggar, (Payot, Paris, 1944; 1955; A. Colon, Paris, 1984).
- Le Niger en kayak, (Editions J. Susse, Paris, 1946).
- Dans les campements touaregs, (Les œuvres françaises, Paris, 1947).
- La chasse chez les Touaregs, (Amiot-Dumont, Paris, 1951).
- A la découverte des fresques du Tassili, (Arthaud, Paris, 1958, 1973, 1992, 2006).
- L'épopée du Ténéré, (Gallimard, Paris, 1961).
- Les gravures rupestres du Sud-oranais, (Arts et Métiers graphiques, Paris, 1970).
- Les gravures rupestres de l'Oued Djerat, (SNED, Algiers, 1976).
- Vers d'autres Tassilis, (Arthaud, Paris, 1976).
- Chameau et dromadaire en Afrique du Nord et au Sahara. Recherche sur leurs origines, (ONAPSA, Alger, 1987).
- Le Sahara, (Grandvaux, 2003).

== See also ==
- Rock art of south Oran (Algeria)
- Arbre du Ténéré
