= Djemaa Beni Habibi =

Coordinates: 36°48′27″N 6°07′25″E

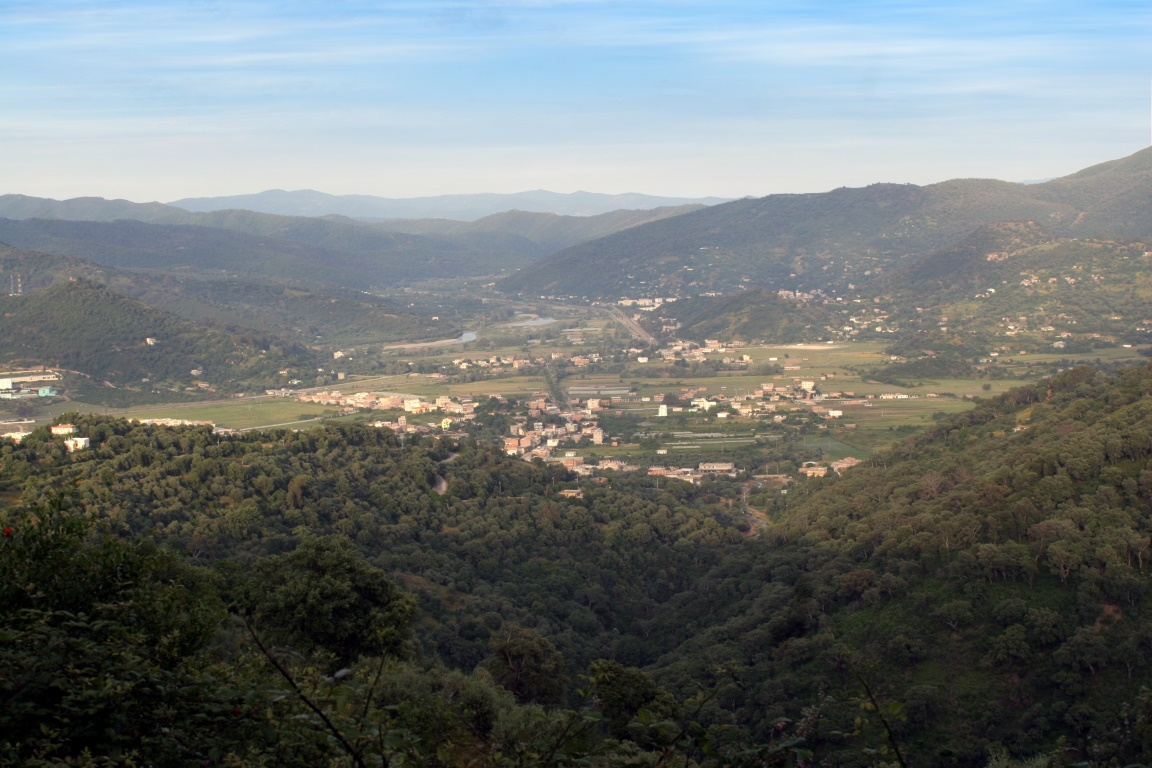

Djemaa Beni Habibi is a municipality of Algeria in Jijel Province. It is located in the northeastern part of the province and close to the Mediterranean coast, 40 kilometres (25 mi) eastern of the city center of Jijel and 90 kilometres (56 mi) northwest of Constantne. It covers 48.25 square kilometres (18.63 sq mi) and is bounded by the west bank of the El-Kebir valley and Seddat mountain. The topography of Djemaa Beni Habibi mostly consists of a chain of mountains covered by forests including oaks, pines, willows, elms, and olives. The climate is temperate, warm and dry in summer, rainy and humid in winter.

Administratively, Djemaa Beni Habibi is one of the municipalities of El Ancer District, which is bounded by Sidi Abdelaziz, Kheiri Oued Adjoul (or Kimir Oued Adjou), El Ancer, Bouraoui Belhadef, Bordj Thar, and Kennar Nouchfi.

The population of Djemaa Beni Habibi was estimated at 14,652 in April 2008. The population is dispersed on several machtas, including El Kaada, Beni Maazouz, Tisbilene, Tamazrar, Teyana, and Zrifa Hiyane.

The main economic sectors of the municipality are agriculture, livestock, and clothing and other crafts.

In August 2026, a major fire caused numerous casualties in the town.
