= Chekfa District =

Coordinates: 36.7713°N 5.9595°E

Chekfa District Mr. Chetan
- District
- Map of Algeria highlighting Jijel Province

- Map of Jijel Province highlighting Chekfa District
- Country: Algeria
- Province: Jijel
- District seat: Chekfa

Area
  - Total: 223.56 km^{2} (86.32 sq mi)

Population (2008)
  - Total: 52,918
  - Density: 236.71/km^{2} (613.07/sq mi)
- Time zone: UTC+01 (CET)
- Municipalities: 4

Chekfa is a district in Jijel Province, Algeria. It was named after its capital, Chekfa.

== Municipalities ==
The district is further divided into 4 municipalities:

- Chekfa
- El Kennar Nouchfi
- Sidi Abdelaziz
- Bordj T'har
