= Taher District =

Coordinates: 36.7720°N 5.8982°E

Taher District دائرة الطاهير
- District
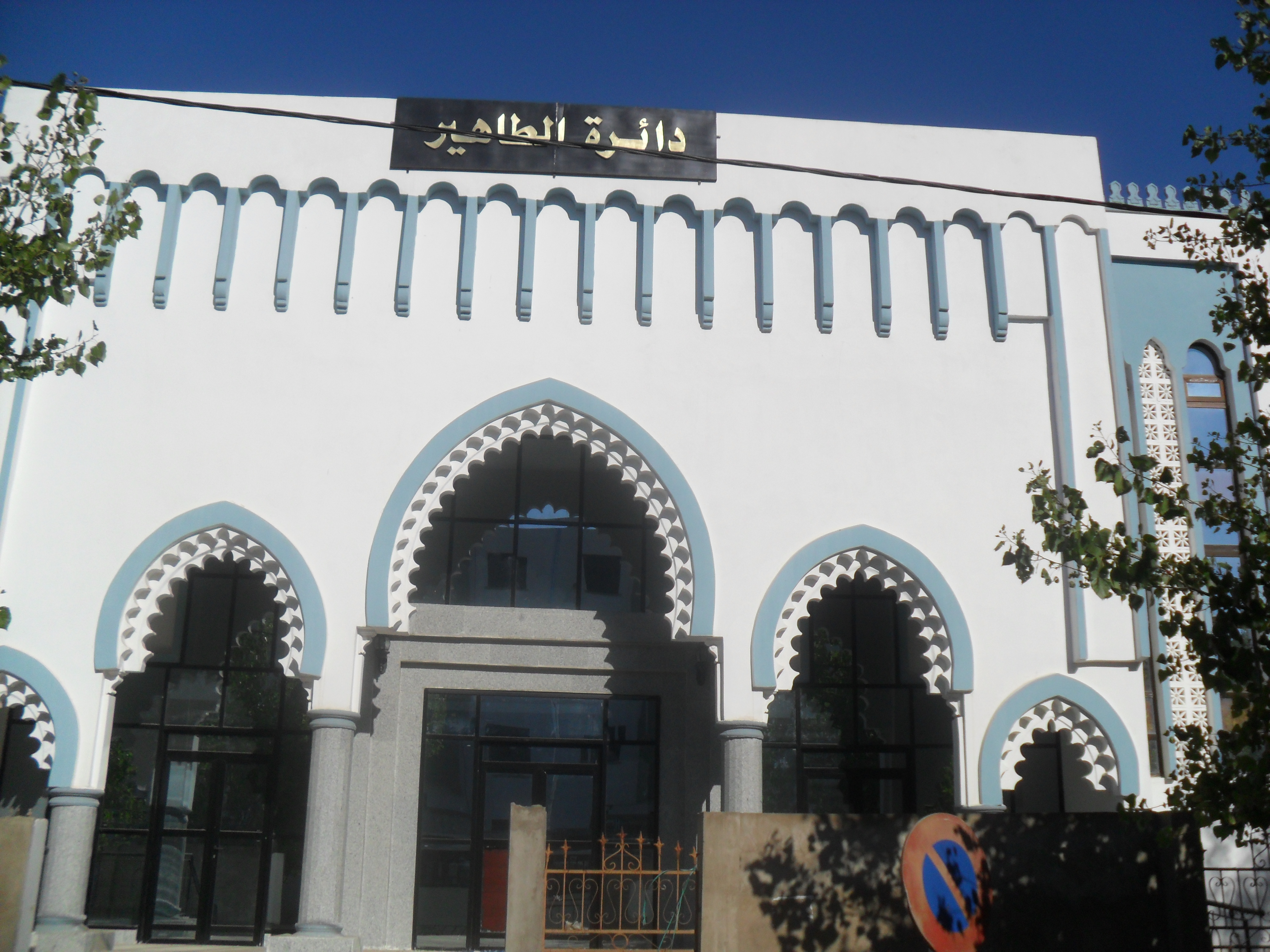

- Map of Algeria highlighting Jijel Province
- Country: Algeria
- Province: Jijel
- District seat: Taher

Area
  - Total: 350.21 km^{2} (135.22 sq mi)

Population (2008)
  - Total: 147,612
  - Density: 421.50/km^{2} (1,091.7/sq mi)
- Time zone: UTC+01 (CET)
- Municipalities: 5

Taher is a district in Jijel Province, Algeria. It was named after its capital, Taher. It is one of the largest districts of the province, in area, population, and population density.

== Municipalities ==
The district is further divided into 5 municipalities:

- Taher
- Boucif Ouled Askeur
- Chahna
- El Amir Abdelkader
- Ouadjana
