= Ancer =

Ancer may refer to:

- Abraham Ancer (born 1991), Mexican professional golfer
- Jonathan Ancer, South African journalist, author, podcaster and media trainer
- Ancer L. Haggerty (born 1944), inactive Senior United States District Judge
- Jesús Ancer Rodríguez Doctor of Philosophy, Mexican researcher and physician

== See also ==
- El Ancer, town and commune in Jijel Province, Algeria
- El Ancer District, district in Jijel Province, Algeria
