= Settara District =

Coordinates: 36.7196°N 6.3355°E

Settara District دائرة السطارة
- District
- Map of Algeria highlighting Jijel Province

- Map of Jijel Province highlighting Settara District
- Country: Algeria
- Province: Jijel
- District seat: Settara

Area
  - Total: 184.33 km^{2} (71.17 sq mi)

Population (1998)
  - Total: 18,976
  - Density: 102.95/km^{2} (266.63/sq mi)
- Time zone: UTC+01 (CET)
- Municipalities: 2

Settara is a district in Jijel Province, Algeria. It was named after its capital, Settara.

== Municipalities ==
The district is further divided into 2 municipalities:

- Settara
- Ghebala
