= Sidi Maârouf District =

Coordinates: 36.6475°N 6.2725°E

Sidi Maârouf District دائرة سيدي معروف
- District
- Map of Algeria highlighting Jijel Province

- Map of Jijel Province highlighting Sidi Maârouf District
- Country: Algeria
- Province: Jijel
- District seat: Sidi Maârouf

Area
  - Total: 136.54 km^{2} (52.72 sq mi)

Population (1998)
  - Total: 29,456
  - Density: 215.73/km^{2} (558.74/sq mi)
- Time zone: UTC+01 (CET)
- Municipalities: 2

Sidi Maârouf is a district in Jijel Province, Algeria. It was named after its capital, Sidi Maârouf.

== Municipalities ==
The district is further divided into 2 municipalities:

- Sidi Maârouf
- Ouled Rabah
