= El Ancer District =

Coordinates: 36.8000°N 6.1667°E

El Ancer District دائرة العنصر
- District
- Map of Algeria highlighting Jijel Province

- Map of Jijel Province highlighting El Ancer District
- Country: Algeria
- Province: Jijel
- District seat: El Ancer

Area
  - Total: 263.94 km^{2} (101.91 sq mi)

Population (1998)
  - Total: 47,347
  - Density: 179.39/km^{2} (464.61/sq mi)
- Time zone: UTC+01 (CET)
- Municipalities: 4

El Ancer is a district in Jijel Province, Algeria. It was named after its capital, El Ancer.

== Municipalities ==
The district is further divided into 4 municipalities:

- Bouraoui Belhadef
- Djemaa Beni Habibi
- El Ancer
- Kheïri Oued Adjoul
