= El Aouana District =

Coordinates: 36.7727°N 5.6100°E

El Aouana District دائرة العوانة
- District
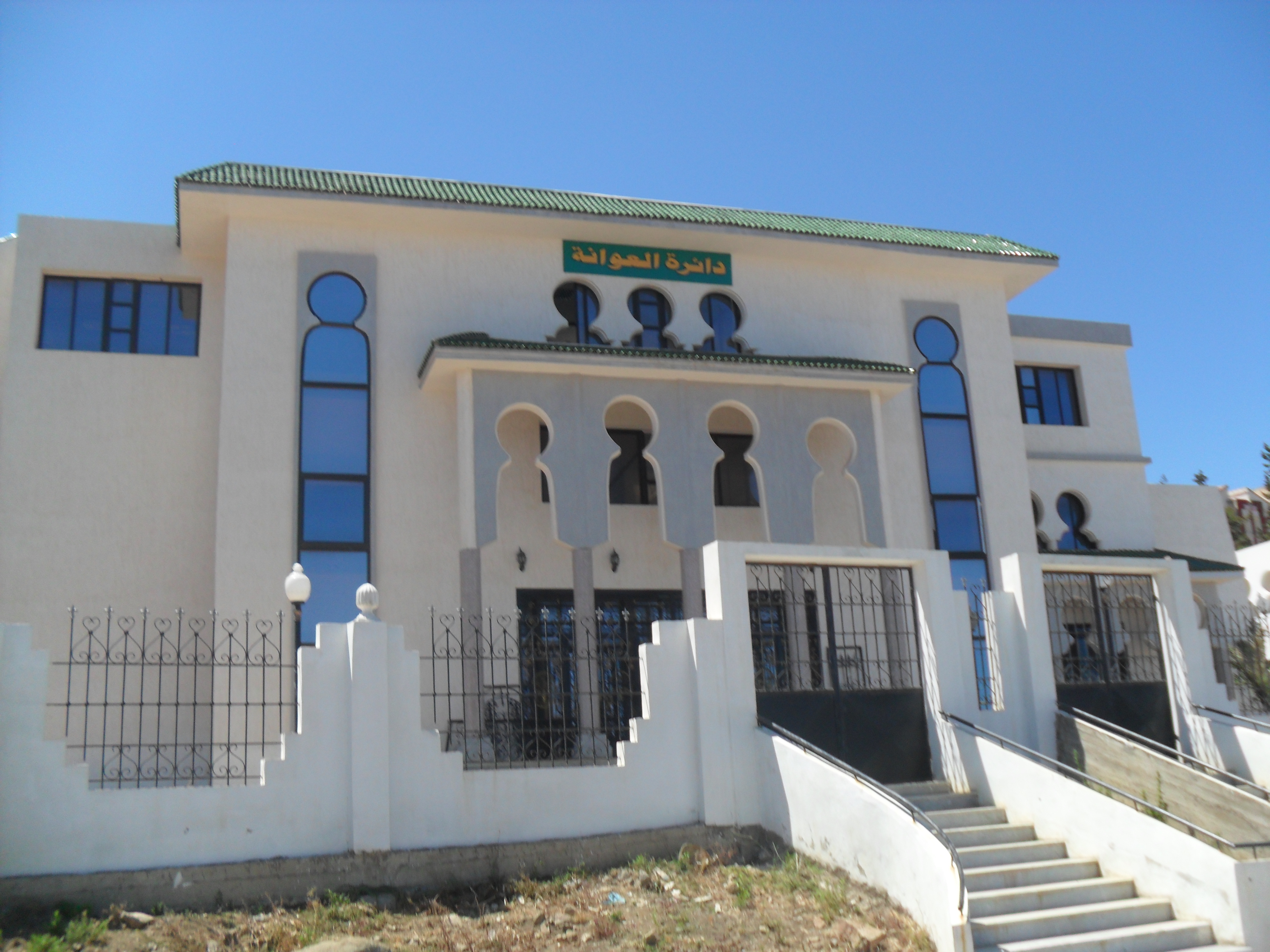

- Map of Algeria highlighting Jijel Province

- Map of Jijel Province highlighting El Aouana District
- Country: Algeria
- Province: Jijel
- District seat: El Aouana

Area
  - Total: 261.26 km^{2} (100.87 sq mi)

Population (1998)
  - Total: 13,948
  - Density: 53.387/km^{2} (138.27/sq mi)
- Time zone: UTC+01 (CET)
- Municipalities: 2

El Aouana is a district in Jijel Province, Algeria. It was named after its capital, El Aouana.

== Municipalities ==
The district is further divided into 2 municipalities:

- El Aouana
- Selma Benziada
