= Djimla District =

Coordinates: 36.5814°N 5.8849°E

Djimla District دائرة جيملة
- District
- Map of Algeria highlighting Jijel Province

- Map of Jijel Province highlighting Djimla District
- Country: Algeria
- Province: Jijel
- District seat: Djimla

Area
  - Total: 145.37 km^{2} (56.13 sq mi)

Population (1998)
  - Total: 22,297
  - Density: 153.38/km^{2} (397.26/sq mi)
- Time zone: UTC+01 (CET)
- Municipalities: 2

Djimla is a district in Jijel Province, Algeria.

== Municipalities ==
The district is further divided into 2 municipalities:

- Djimla
- Boudriaa Ben Yadjis
