= Amar Bentoumi =

Algerian lawyer and politician (1923-2013)

Minister of Justice and Keeper of the Seals
- In office 1962–1963
- President: Ferhat Abbas
- Prime Minister: Ahmed Ben Bella
- Preceded by: Position created
- Succeeded by: Mohamed El Hadi Hadj Smain

Personal details
- Born: 26 December 1923 Constantine, Algeria
- Died: 29 March 2013 (aged 89) Algiers, Algeria
- Profession: Lawyer

Amar Bentoumi (26 December 1923 – 29 March 2013) was an Algerian lawyer, independence activist and politician. He was the first Minister of Justice, Keeper of the Seals, of independent Algeria.

== Early life ==
Amar Bentoumi was born in Constantine, Algeria on 26 December 1923, to a family from Sidi Aïch (Béjaïa).

In his youth, in Algiers, he was alternately lemonade, railway worker, day laborer. He sometimes develops a trade union activity.

== Nationalist ==
Bentoumi entered the Algerian nationalist movement very early on, in 1943: “I was recruited by Hocine Asselah, leader of the MCA basketball team. In the Mouloudéen formation, the two backs were Abdelmalek Temam and me. In September 1943, I participated in the first demonstration during Eid al-Fitr. I was arrested along with Sid Ali Abdelhamid and defended by French lawyers». In the baccalaureate, I obtained a very good mark in philosophy and intended to study for a bachelor's degree in history, but Asselah discouraged me from doing so. “Practice law to be the party's lawyer”This was what I did. I was sworn in on July 10, 1947 to plead all cases in which the PPA was involved. It happened at the Algiers Bar alongside my colleagues Gonon, Ali Boumendjel and Hocine Tayebi".

== Insurgent ==
After All Saints' Day of 1954, Amar became one of the lawyers of the FLN. He was arrested in February 1957 and imprisoned in Berrouaghia then in Bossuet. "I had become the clandestine responsible for it with Cheikh Sahnoun as muphti, alongside Djennas, Kerbouche, Aroua, Dr Belouizdad."

== Minister ==
In 1962, at the time of the ceasefire, he was rapporteur for the justice commission of the Evian accords, then a member of the central referendum commission for independence. Then he was appointed chief of cabinet of Rabah Bitat during the last months of the GPRA (Provisional Government of the Algerian Republic) before being elected deputy of Algiers on July 22, 1962, within the Constituent Assembly. Finally, he was the first justice minister of independent Algeria in the government of Ahmed Ben Bella on September 27, 1962.

== Human rights lawyer ==
Not renewed in the second Ben Bella government, he was arrested and imprisoned in the Algerian desert, with Ferhat Abbas and many others for more than a year in 1963. He resumed his legal profession in 1965, before become president of Algiers in 1971. He is a member of the sponsorship committee of the Russell Tribunal on Palestine whose work was presented on March 4, 2009. The last year of his life he violently attacked Ben Bella whom he accused of having denounced all the members of the OS (Special Organization) during his arrest following the attack in the city of Oran. He will defend Abane Ramdane as a persisting activist against Ben Bella's attempts to damage his past.

== Death ==
Bentoumi died in Algiers on 29 March 2013, at the age of 89.

== See also ==
- Ali Yahia Abdennour
- Hocine Zehouane
- Mostefa Bouchachi
