= Bouhouche =

Bouhouche is a surname. Notable people with the surname include:

- Ammar Bouhouche, Algerian academic
- Madani Bouhouche (1952–2005), Belgian gendarme

== See also ==
- Bir Bouhouche, town and comune in Souk Ahras Province, Algeria
