= Ammar Bouhouche =

Algerian political scientist

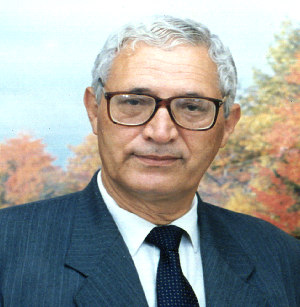
- Ammar Bouhouche (2003)
- Born: Ammar Bouhouche; December 17, 1938 (age 86); El Ancer, El Milia, Jijel, Algeria.
- Education: University of Missouri
- Years active: 1956–present
- Title: Ph.D of Political science in the University of Algiers 3
- Children: 2
- Parents: Hocine Bouhouche; Yamina Kaddour
- Awards: 1. Prize of academic achievement conferred by the Algerian President, Chadli Benjeded in 1987.; 2. Prize of the University of Algiers for best publication on April 16, 2000.; 3. Prize of the best teaching professor at the institute of Political Science at the University of Algiers, in 1992.; 4. fellowship of Fulbright Program at the University of University of Wisconsin-Madison, 1991 – 1992.; 5. Honorary Certificate from the University of Algiers (3), as an appreciation for his participation in the Algerian Revolution.
- Website: ammarbouhouche.com

Ammar Bouhouche was born on December 17, 1938, in Al-Ancer (El-milia, Jijel), Algeria.

He was member of the National Liberation Army, and later the National Liberation Front. Bouhouche is known for his nationalist activism in the Middle East and The United States of America supporting the Algerian Revolution against French colonisation and oppression.

First Algerian holder of a Ph.D. in political science, his professional career started at the Algerian presidency with Houari Boumediene. Few years later he decided to join the University of Algiers, then the Arab organization of Administrative Sciences as senior expert, in Amman (Jordan).

He held various senior positions in academic and scientific circles, both in his country and abroad, and has been awarded several prizes for his academic achievements.

The former Secretary-General of the United Nations, Boutros Boutros-Ghali, said that Bouhouche is one of the most prominent specialist in the fields of political science and public administration.

== Early life ==
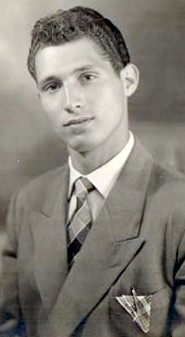
1956

Bouhouche was the first born of Hocine and Yamina Kaddour, in the village of Aziar, where there was no electricity or running water, near El-milia, in the east of Algeria.

He fled his village after setting fire to the office of the French occupation administration and moved to Constantine in 1953, and continued his education in the Institute of Abdelhamid Ben Badis.

In 1956, he joined the National Liberation Army in Tunis.

Two years later, he was sent by the National Liberation Front to Kuwait in order to continue his education and then in the USA in 1960.

From an early age, he was very active and eager for great achievement. Bouhouche was among the founding members of the General Union of Algerian Muslim Students chapter of Kuwait, actively participating in promoting the Algerian cause in the Gulf countries and the United States.

== Education ==
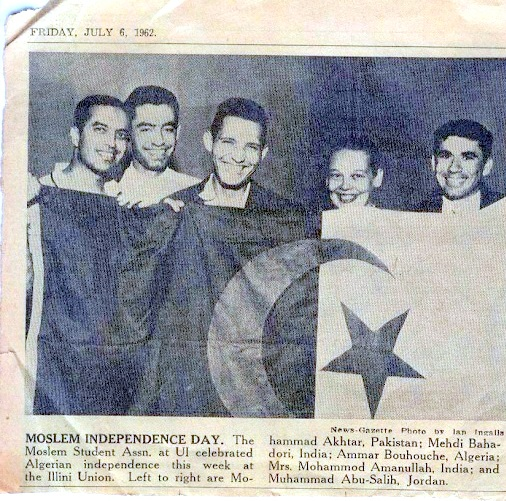
Celebrating the first day of the independence of Algeria in the USA

Bouhouche continued his secondary education in Shuwaikh secondary school, at Kuwait, and received his B.A. and M.A. from Northern Illinois University.

He obtained his Ph.D. from the University of Missouri at Colombia, in 1970, after that pursued his summer study at the University of California in 1963, and Mary Queens College at the University of Oxford in 1965.

He was promoted emeritus professor in 2008.

== Academic teaching ==
After joining University of Algiers in 1975, he taught at the University of Damascus (1982), University of Jordan (1983), Kuwait University (1987), Al-Bayt University (Jordan, 1998), and at the Naif University in Riyadh (2001 – 2005), in addition to spending the academic year 1991-1992 as a Fulbright Scholar at the University of Wisconsin-Madison.

Professor Bouhouche is the first Algerian holder of a Ph.D in Political Science, as well as the first Algerian promoted to the rank of professor in Political Science, and also the sole Algerian Emeritus professor in this field.

== Administrative experience ==
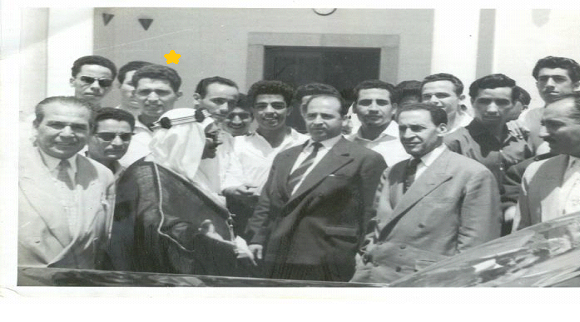
Ammar with historical leader Ferhat Abbes and Krim Belkacem (1959)

Chargé de mission at the Algerian Presidency between 1971 and 1975, he decided to join the Arab organization of Administrative Sciences in Amman as senior expert (Jordan, 1980–1982), after few years teaching at University of Algiers.

Some of the functions he held, includes chairman of the scientific council at the institute of Political science, at University of Algiers from 1985 to 1992, Chairman of the Department of Public Administration at the university of Al-Bayt University (Jordan) from 1996 to 1998, and Director of the Research Laboratory in Political Studies at the University of Algiers, from 1999 to 2006.

== Prizes for academic achievements ==
1. Prize of academic achievement conferred by the Algerian President, Chadli Benjeded in 1987.
2. Prize of the University of Algiers for best publication on April 16, 2000.
3. Prize of the best teaching professor at the institute of Political Science at the University of Algiers, in 1992.
4. Fulbright fellowship at the university of University of Wisconsin-Madison, 1991 – 1992.
5. Honorary Certificate from the University of Algiers (3), as an appreciation for his participation in the Algerian Revolution.

== Ability to enrich the field of political science ==
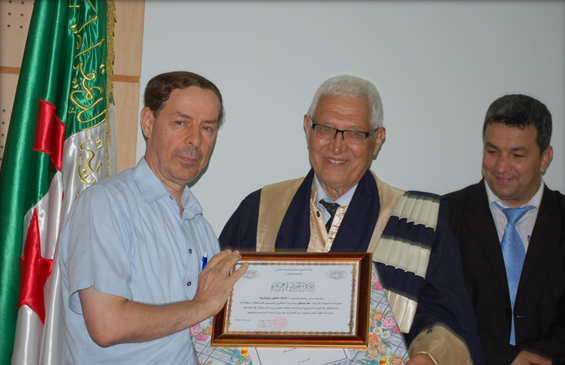
Honored Ammar Bouhouche

"Bouhouche is one of the most prominent specialist in the fields of political science and public administration and methodology", said Dr. Boutros Boutros-Ghali, the former Secretary-General of the United Nations, who described Bouhouche's book Evolution of Theories and Political Systems as one of the best books he has ever read about political science. He appreciated his efforts to compare political systems of Chinese, Russian, Cuban and Algerian revolutions. The leaders of each revolution succeeded in developing their own particular political systems.

In the field of public administration, Bouhouche wrote three outstanding textbooks. He founded the specialty in political science called the science of organization. This Department was created in 1971 when Mohamed Seddik Ben Yahia decided to make reforms in the programs of high education. Mr. Ben Yahia invited Mr. Bouhouche and talked to him about his desires to create the science of management at the Algerian universities. Professor Bouhouche advised Mr. Ben Yahia to focus on the field of public administration, but he said that this subject is taught at the national School of Administration. At the end, the Minister responded favorably to Bouhouche's proposal and created the Department of Sciences of Organization.

Bouhouche and his Jordanian colleague Dr. Mohamed Mahmoud Thneibat have written one of the best books in the science of methodology, in the year 2000. Up to now, the book has been re-edited and published 8 times by the Office of Academic Publications, students and researchers in social sciences have learned a lot from this book.

== Publications (books) ==
1. The Algerian Migrant Workers. Algiers: SNED, 1974.
2. Evolution of Theories and Political Systems. Algiers. SNED, 1978.
3. Modern Tendencies in Public Administration. Alger. SNED, 1981.
4. Contemporary Political Studies on Algeria. Beirut: Dar Algharb Alislami, 2007.
5. Theories of Public Administration in the Twenty one Century. Beirut, Dar Algharb Alislami, 2006.
6. The Political History of Algeria: from the Beginning until 1962. Beirut: Dar Algharb, 1997.
7. The Political History of Algeria: 1962-2014 Alger. Dar Albassair, 2015.
8. A Guide of Researcher in Writing Theses. Alger. ENAG, 1990.
9. Tendencies in Consulting. Amman, Jordan. The AOAS, 1983.
10. Theories in Public Administration. Amman, Jordan, 1982
11. The Role of Bureaucracy in Modern Societies. Amman, Jordan: the AOAS, 1983.

Joint work

1. Ammar Bouhouche and Thneibat Mohamed, Methods for Doing Scientific Research. Alger: OPU, 2014.
2. Ammar, Bouhouche in Azzidine Layachi, "The Essence of Reforms in Algeria" in Economic crisis and Political change in North Africa. New York: Praeger (USA), 1998.
3. Ammar Bouhouche, "The Return of The Algerian Refugees Following Independence of Algeria" in when Refugees go home. London: James Currey, 1994.
4. Ammar, Bouhouche, and Belkacem Belabes, "Algeria : Democracy and Development in the era of despotism" in Ibrahim El-Badawi and Samir Makdissi, Democracy in the Arab World : Explaining the Deficit. London: Routledge, 2011.

In additions to those Books, there are more than 100 articles published in scientific journals, besides contribution to public debates and scientific publishing.
