= El Milia District =

El Milia District دائرة الميلية
- District
- Map of Algeria highlighting Jijel Province

- Map of Jijel Province highlighting El Milia District
- Coordinates: 36°45′N 6°16′E
- Country: Algeria
- Province: Jijel
- District seat: El Milia

Area
  - Total: 340.65 km^{2} (131.53 sq mi)

Population (1998)
  - Total: 86,762
  - Density: 254.70/km^{2} (659.66/sq mi)
- Time zone: UTC+01 (CET)
- Municipalities: 2

El Milia is a district in Jijel Province, Algeria.

It was named after its capital, the town of El Milia.

== Municipalities ==
The district is further divided into 2 municipalities:

- El Milia
- Ouled Yahia Khedrouche
