= Henri Jules Bataille =

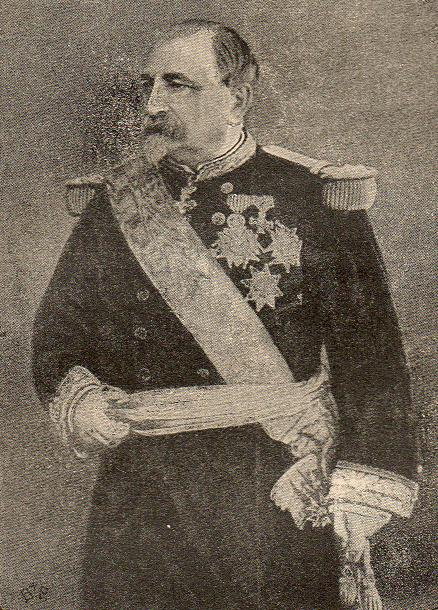
- Born: 6 September 1816; Le Bourg-d'Oisans, France
- Died: 10 January 1882 (aged 65) Paris, France
- Allegiance: France
- Branch: French Army
- Service years: 1834–1881
- Rank: Général de Division
- Commands: 45th Line Infantry Regiment; II Corps; V Corps
- Conflicts: Pacification of Algeria; Siege of Zaatcha; Kabylia campaign; Battle of Djemaa Beni Habibi; Second Italian War of Independence; Battle of Magenta; Franco-Prussian War; Battle of Saarbrücken; Battle of Spicheren; Battle of Gravelotte; Battle of Mars-la-Tour; Siege of Metz
- Awards: Grand Cross of the Legion of Honour

Henri Jules Bataille (6 September 1816, Le Bourg-d'Oisans, Isère – 10 January 1882, Paris) was a nineteenth-century French soldier. He rose to général de division of infantry, saw colonial service in Algeria, and fought in the Second Italian War of Independence and the Franco-Prussian War. He was awarded the Grand Cross of the Legion of Honour.

== Life ==
=== Early life ===
Henri Jules Bataille was the son of Captain Jean Pierre Bataille and Sophie Antoinette Garnier. Jean Pierre Bataille, born 14 January 1772 at Bourg-d’Oisans, was a cavalry captain who achieved the distinction of Chevalier de la Légion d'honneur and Ordre royal de la Couronne de Fer. He enlisted in 1791 in the first battalion of Isère, then incorporated into the Army of the Alps. As a young corporal at the Battle of Rivoli on 14–15 January 1797, he and three comrades took 116 prisoners, and he received a sabre of honor for this feat of arms. From 1800 to 1815 he participated in all of Napoleon Bonaparte's campaigns from the Egyptian campaign of 1798–1801 to the Waterloo campaign of 1815. He died in 1823.

After Jean Pierre Bataille's death, the French Minister of War, Aimé, duc de Clermont-Tonnerre, toured Bataille's home province, Dauphiné. Jean Pierre Bataille's widow requested of Aimé that her son, Henri Jules Bataille, be admitted to the Collège Henri-IV de La Flèche, a military school. The younger Bataille was accepted.

=== Military career ===
On 16 November 1834, Bataille entered the French military academy at Saint-Cyr. Graduating in October 1836, he was appointed a sous-lieutenant (second lieutenant) in the 22nd Line Infantry Regiment. On 30 January 1839, he embarked with his regiment for Algeria, where he was stationed until 10 September 1841. While there, he was promoted to lieutenant on 25 May 1840, and he later achieved the rank of capitaine on 12 March 1843. On 9 February 1847 he became adjutant major in the French Foreign Legion's 2nd Foreign Infantry Regiment. In 1849, he was present at the Siege of Zaatcha of 16 July – 26 November 1849, where we was wounded in the shoulder. He was mentioned in orders by the Army of Africa. He became the commander of a battalion of native troops from Constantine and participated in the Kabylia campaign in 1850, most notably in action on 24 June 1850 at Djemaa Beni Habibi, and General Jacques Leroy de Saint-Arnaud cited him in a report for his leadership of the battalion. He received the Knight's Cross of the Legion of Honour on 12 December 1850.

Viewed in the French Army as a promising young officer, Bataille was made lieutenant colonel of the 56th Line Infantry Regiment on 8 August 1851. In 1853 he returned to Algeria to again serve with the 2nd Foreign Infantry Regiment, beginning another four-year stay in Algeria that lasted until September 1857 and during which he often took part in or led expeditions into the Algerian countryside. During this tour of duty in Algeria he became colonel of the 45th Line Infantry Regiment on 7 February 1854 and was awarded the Officer's Cross of the Legion of Honour on 12 June 1856. On 12 August 1857, shortly before leaving Algeria, he was promoted to général de brigade.

In April 1859, Bataille went to Italy for combat operations in the Second Italian War of Independence. Serving in the III Corps, he participated in the Battle of Magenta on 4 June 1859, performing so well that he was made a Commander of the Legion of Honour on 16 June 1859. On 16 August 1866, he was promoted to the rank of major general.

When the Franco-Prussian War broke out in July 1870, Bataille was in command of the 2nd Division of général de division Charles Auguste Frossard's II Army Corps. His division led Frossard's forces in the war's opening battle, the Battle of Saarbrücken, on 2 August 1870. At the Battle of Spicheren on 6 August, Frossard placed Bataille's division in reserve, but Bataille committed the division to action without orders from Frossard, splitting it into two parts to support the French line against the German attack and shoring up the French line, although denying Frossard any opportunity to maneuver by committing his reserve. Judging the threat on the French left to be growing, Bataille on his own initiative detached a regiment to reinforce the left, and at the end of the day had to extract the elements of his division on the French right around Stiring-Wendel under difficult circumstances as the French army pulled back from the battlefield.

At the Battle of Mars-la-Tour on 16 August 1870, Bataille's division held the part of the French line at Vionville and Flavigny-sur-Moselle. He was wounded in the stomach during the battle. He had two horses killed under him at the Battle of Gravelotte on 18 August 1870. In danger of losing his life, he was transported to Metz, which was surrounded by German forces on 19 August 1870 and eventually surrendered on 27 October 1870 after the 70-day Siege of Metz. Bataille was taken prisoner when Metz capitulated.

The Franco-Prussian War ended in January 1871. Returning to France after his captivity in Germany, Bataille was appointed commander of the II Corps of the Army of Versailles in July 1871. He became a Grand Officer of the Legion of Honour on 3 October 1871. In 1873, he was appointed head of the V Corps headquartered in Orléans, and he was awarded the Great Cross of the Legion of Honour on 11 January 1876.

In 1879, the political left of the French Chamber of Deputies under the Chamber's president, Léon Gambetta, proposed to the President of France, Marshall of France Patrice de MacMahon, a decree which revolved around confiscating and diminishing the number of military commands held by certain generals, including Bataille, Charles-Denis Bourbaki, François Charles du Barail and Auguste-Alexandre Ducrot. MacMahon refused to sign it, and resigned on 30 January 1879. MacMahon's successor as president, Jules Grévy, signed the decree on 11 February 1879. Bataille retired from the army at his own request on 19 September 1881.

=== Later life ===
Bataille served as General Councillor for Le Bourg-d'Oisans for two years, then retired, as he did not enjoy political life.

== Awards and honors ==
- Knight of the Legion of Honour (12 December 1850)
- Officer of the Legion of Honour (12 June 1856)
- Commander of the Legion of Honour (16 June 1859)
- Grand Officer of the Legion of Honour (3 October 1871)
- Grand Cross of the Legion of Honour (11 January 1876)
