= Ziama Mansouriah District =

Coordinates: 36.6737°N 5.4811°E

Ziama Mansouriah District دائرة زيامة منصورية
- District
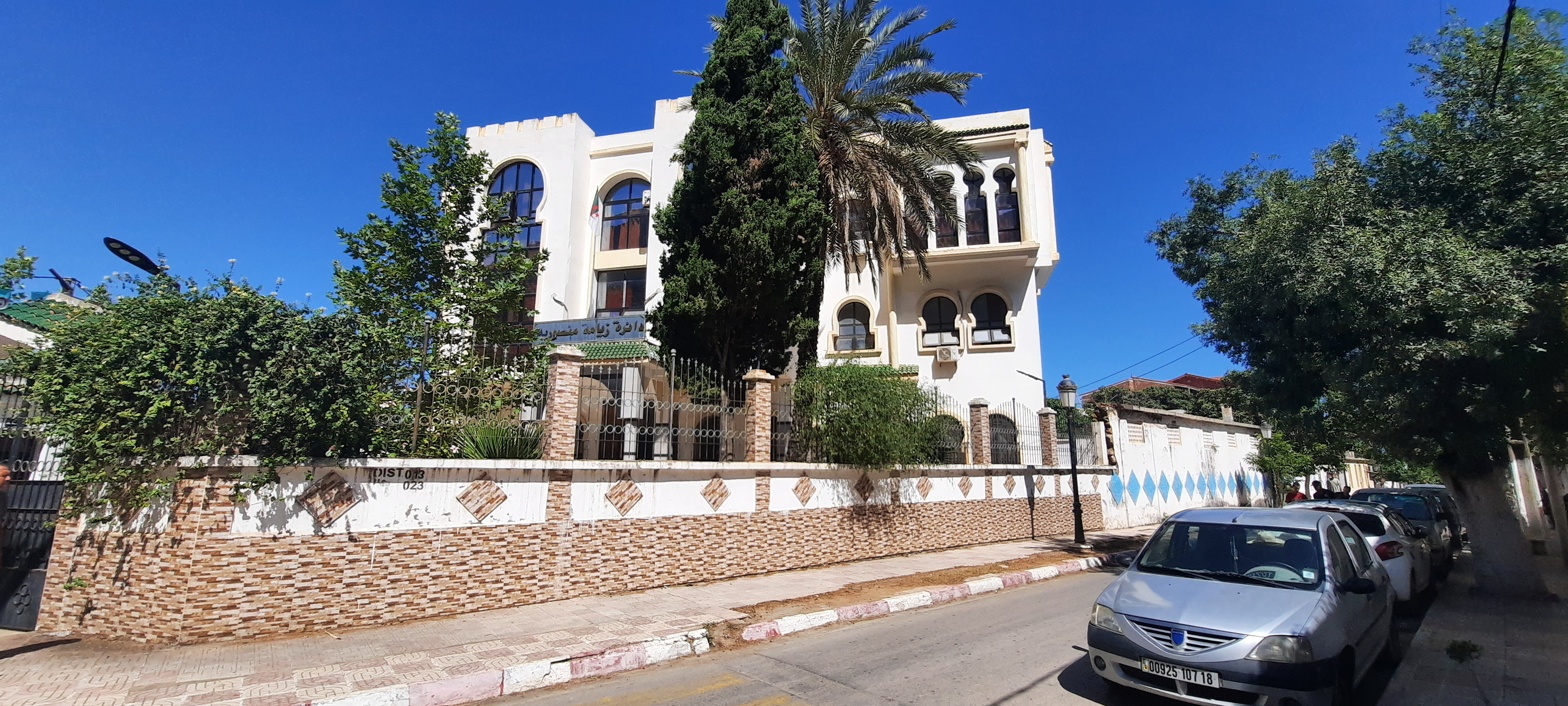

- Map of Algeria highlighting Jijel Province
- Country: Algeria
- Province: Jijel
- District seat: Ziama Mansouriah

Area
  - Total: 246.01 km^{2} (94.98 sq mi)

Population (1998)
  - Total: 16,033
  - Density: 65.172/km^{2} (168.80/sq mi)
- Time zone: UTC+01 (CET)
- Municipalities: 2

Ziama Mansouriah is a district in Jijel Province, Algeria. It was named after its capital, Ziama Mansouriah.

== Municipalities ==
The district is further divided into 2 municipalities:

- Ziama Mansouriah
- Eraguene
