= Bordj T'har =

Coordinates: 36°44′49″N 6°02′03″E

- Commune and town
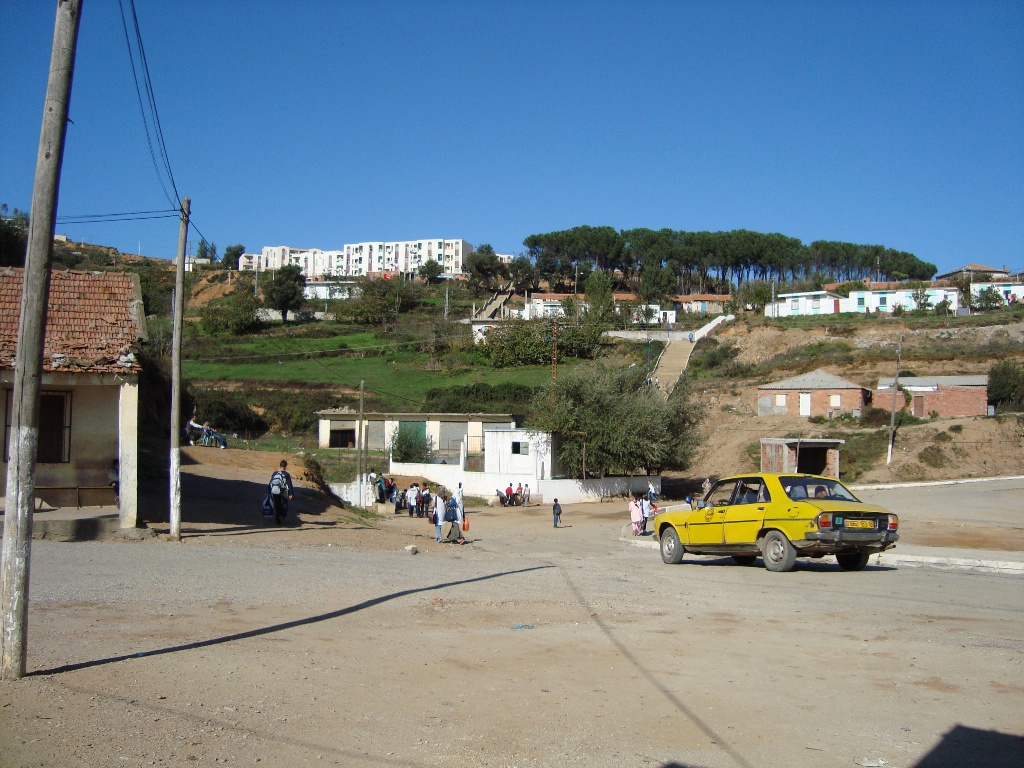

- Country: Algeria
- Province: Jijel Province
- District: Chekfa

Area
  - Total: 26.32 sq mi (68.17 km^{2})
- Elevation: 2,690 ft (820 m)

Population (1998)
  - Total: 4,893
- Time zone: UTC+1 (CET)
- Postal code: 18260

Bordj T'har is a town and commune in Jijel Province, Algeria. According to the 1998 census it has a population of 4893.
