= Mostefa Bouchachi =

Algerian lawyer and politician

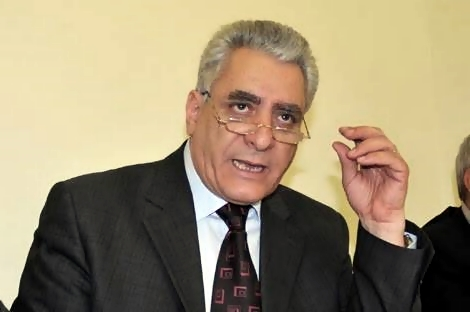
Mostefa Bouchachi

Mostefa Bouchachi (Arabic: مصطفى بوشاشي; born in 1954 in Sidi Abdelaziz, in the current Jijel Province, Algeria) is an Algerian lawyer and politician.

He was the President of the Algerian League for the Defense of Human Rights (LADDH) from 2007 to 2012.

== Biography ==
Mostefa Bouchachi was born in 1954 in Mechta Aazib, Douar Bouyoucef Current commune of Sidi Abdelaziz in Jijel Province.

As the son of a shahid (martyr of the revolution) he was educated after 1962 in a martyr's children's center in Oued Aïssi, near Tizi-Ouzou.

Coming from a family of revolutionaries, Mostefa was only 6 years old when his father Mokhtar, moudjahid, was killed in 1960 during a bombardment in Wilaya.

== Education ==
Mostefa continued his secondary studies at the Colonel Amirouche high school in the same town of Tizi Ouzou.

After obtaining the baccalaureate, Mostefa Bouchachi moved to Algiers and began a graduate course at the Faculty of Law of the University of Algiers.

Mostefa Bouchachi obtained a magister degree in law from the University of Southampton in the United Kingdom where he was sent as part of an Algerian state scholarship.

== Professional career ==
In the early 1980s, back in Algiers after his studies in the United Kingdom, Mostefa Bouchachi taught at the law faculty of the University of Algiers.

He taught courses in criminal procedure.

He also registered with the Algiers Bar to practice as a lawyer.

== Political background ==
Mostefa Bouchachi joined the Socialist Forces Front (FFS) in 1979.. He was appointed to the position of Ministry of Justice and served from 2010 to 2012.

In the 1990s, he joined the Algerian League for the Defense of Human Rights (LADDH), which he chaired from 2007 to 2012.

During the 2012 Algerian legislative election Mostefa Bouchachi was elected as FFS deputy for the People's National Assembly (APN) in the Algiers Province.

He resigned from his mandate as deputy in March 2014 to be replaced by Mohammed Nabbous.

In 2019, during the mass demonstrations of 2019–2020 Algerian protests which notably led to the resignation of President Abdelaziz Bouteflika—in power since 1999—and which continued to demand the establishment of a democratic transition, Mostefa Bouchachi became a leading figure in the movement.

On December 10, 19 personalities, including former Minister of Foreign Affairs Ahmed Taleb Ibrahimi Bouchachi, former Minister of Education Ali Benmohamed, former Minister of Culture, Abdelaziz Rahabi, lawyer Ali Yahia Abdennour, former head of government Ahmed Benbitour, sociologist Abdelghani Badi, as well as academics Nacer Djabi and Louisa Ait Hamadouche, called not to prevent those who wanted to vote during the Algerian presidential election of 2019.

== See also ==
- Ali Yahia Abdennour
- Hocine Aït Ahmed
