= Sidi Maarouf, Jijel =

Coordinates: 36°38′51″N 6°16′21″E

- Commune and town
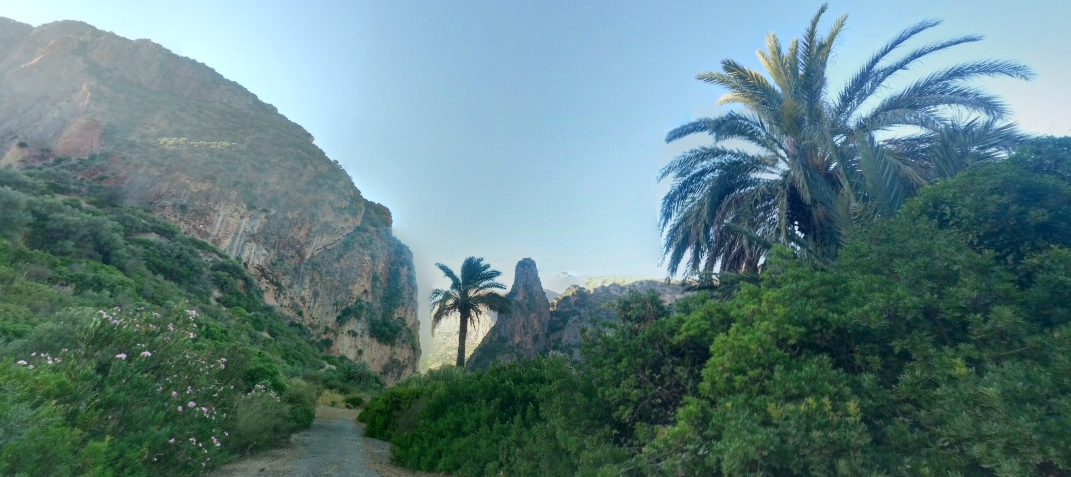

- Country: Algeria
- Province: Jijel Province

Population (1998)
  - Total: 19,314
- Time zone: UTC+1 (CET)

Sidi Maarouf, Jijel is a town and commune in Jijel Province, Algeria. According to the 1998 census it has a population of 19,314.
