= Hocine Zehouane =

Algerian politician and human rights activist (1935–2025)

President of the LADDH
- In office 2005–2007
- Preceded by: Ali Yahia Abdennour
- Succeeded by: Mostefa Bouchachi

Personal details
- Born: Ḥusin Zehuan; August 13, 1935 Draâ Ben Khedda, Tizi Ouzou Province, French Algeria
- Died: March 17, 2025 (aged 89)
- Resting place: El Alia Cemetery
- Citizenship: Algerian
- Party: MTLD; FLN
- Occupation: Human Rights militant
- Profession: Politician, lawyer

Military service
- Allegiance: ALN
- Years of service: 1951–1962
- Rank: Officer

Hocine Zehouane (Kabyle: Ḥusin Zehuan; 13 August 1935 – 17 March 2025) was an Algerian politician and human rights activist.

== Early life ==
Hocine Zehouane was born in Draâ Ben Khedda in Kabylia in Algeria. He joined the Movement for the Triumph of Democratic Liberties MTLD, in 1954, while still in high school. He was then arrested and imprisoned from 1955 to 1957. On his release from prison, he joined the maquis in Kabylia. Wilaya III officer (Kabylia). He joined the Provisional Government of the Algerian Republic in March 1960.

== The League for Human Rights ==
In 1985, he participated in the founding of the first Algerian League for Human Rights (LADH), and in 2005 he became president of the Algerian League for the Defense of Human Rights.

== After the liberation ==
As a member of the Political Bureau of the National Liberation Front in 1964, in charge of the guidance sector, Hocine Zehouane participated in the first regional Congress of the General Union of Algerian Workers. On this occasion, he declared that "Algerian workers must gain access to political power".

He opposed the coup d'etat of 19 June 1965, by Houari Boumedienne, which led him to prison before being placed under house arrest in the south from 1965 to 1971. He went into exile in France after 1973 and returned to his country after the death of Algerian President Houari Boumédiène.

Hocine died on 17 March 2025, at the age of 89.
