= Fethnour Lacheheb =

Algerian handball player (born 1963)

Personal information
- Nationality: Algerian
- Born: 20 October 1963 (age 63) El Ancer, Algeria

Sport
- Sport: Handball

Fethnour Lacheheb (born 20 October 1963) is an Algerian handball player. He competed in the men's tournament at the 1988 Summer Olympics.
