= Chahna =

- Commune and town
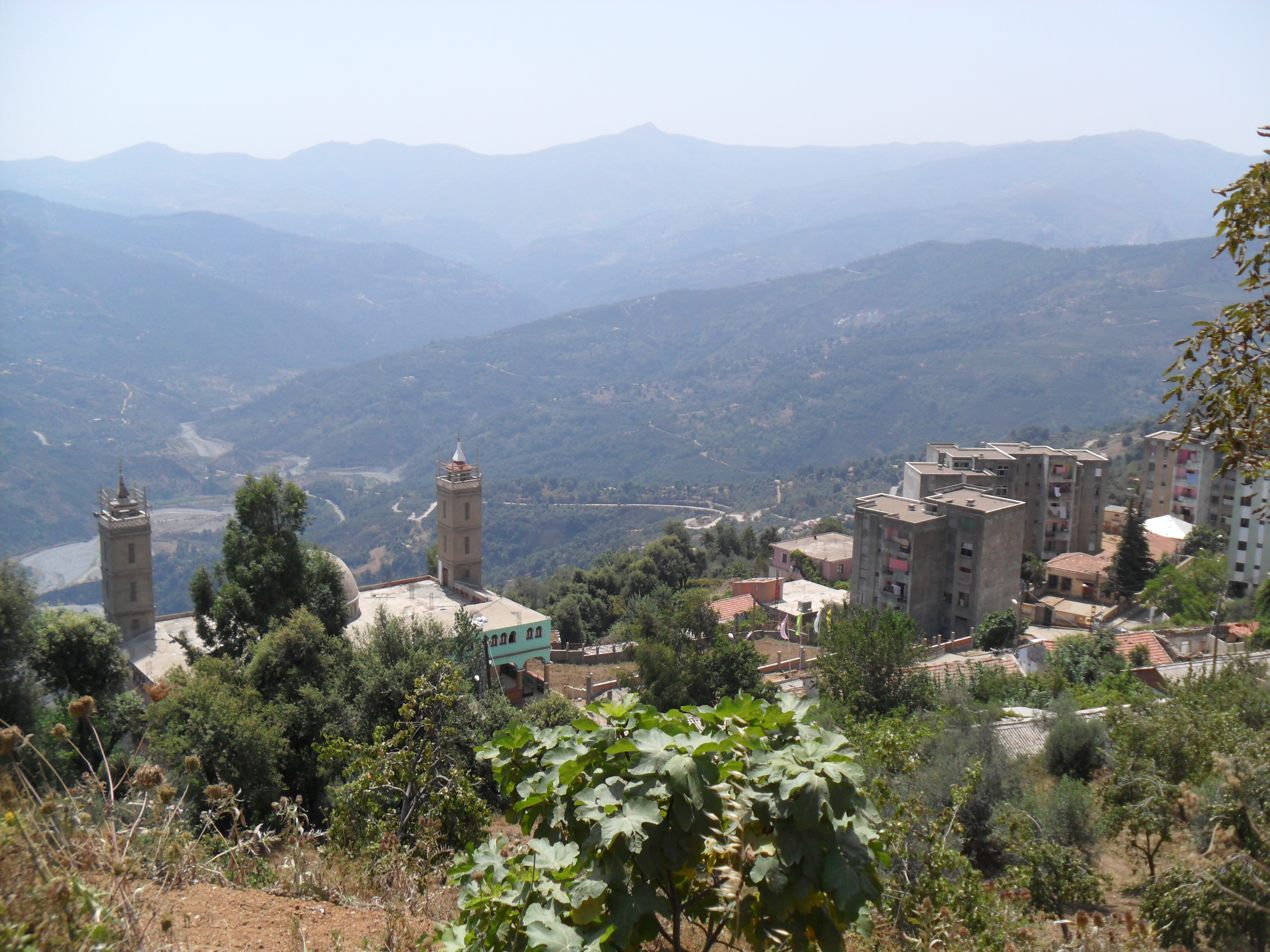

- Location within Algeria
- Coordinates: 36.6793738°N 5.9572034°E
- Country: Algeria
- Province: Jijel Province
- District: Taher District

Population (2008)
  - Total: 8,781
- Time zone: UTC+1 (CET)

Chahna is a town and commune in Jijel Province, Algeria. According to the 1998 census it has a population of 9,453.
