= Taher =

Taher الطاهير Tahir
- City and Commune
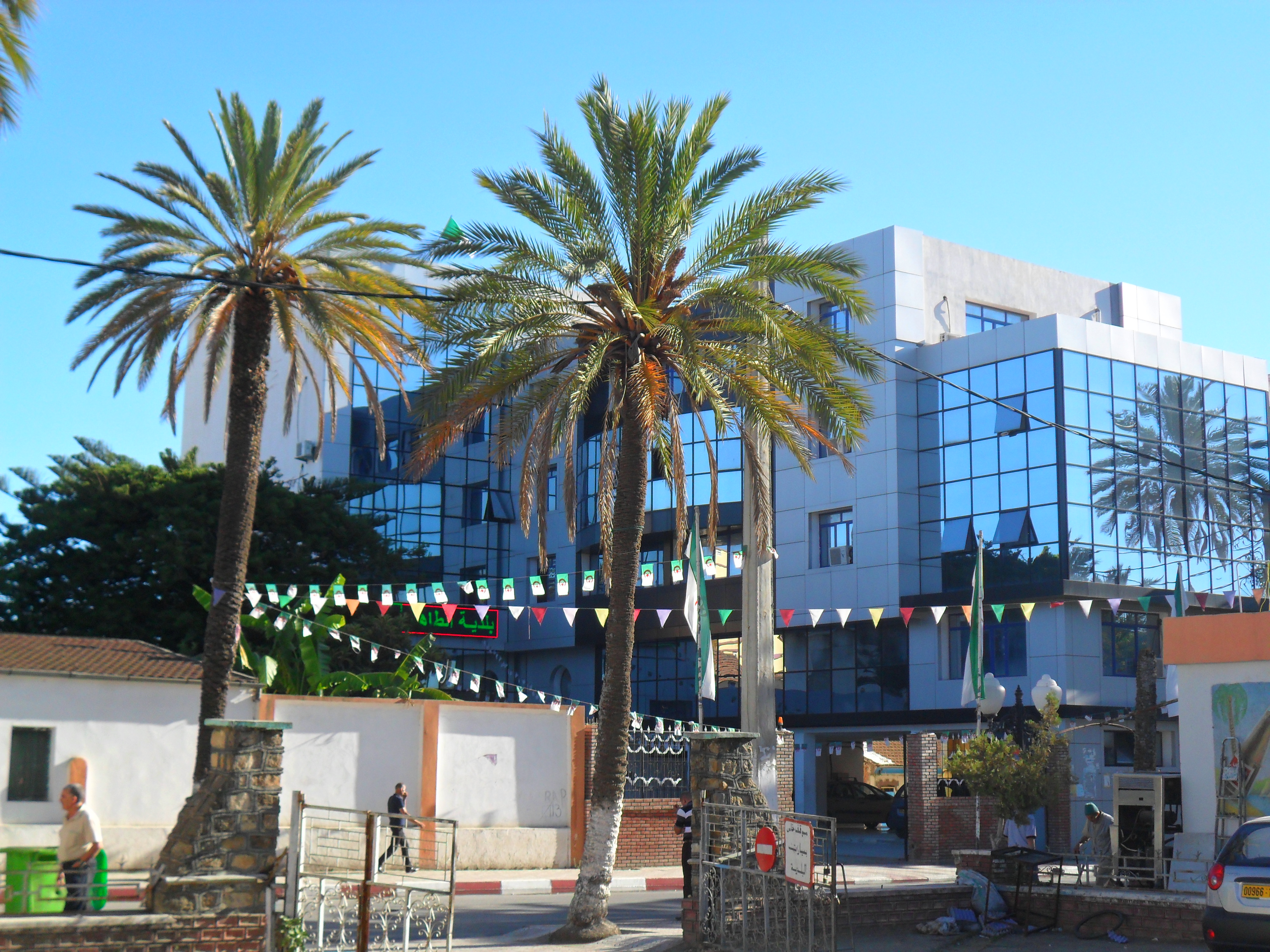
- Taher Town Hall
- Motto: "From the people, for the people"
- Location of Taher in the Jijel Province

- Location of Taher in the Algeria
- Coordinates: 36°46′19″N 5°53′54″E
- Country: Algeria
- Province: Jijel Province
- District: Taher District
- APC: 2012-2017

Government
  - Type: Municipality
  - Mayor: Hafid Boumahrouk (RND)

Area
  - Total: 29,872 sq mi (77,367 km^{2})

Population (2008)
  - Total: 78,500
  - Density: 31,350/sq mi (12,103/km^{2})
- Time zone: UTC+1 (CET)
- Postal code: 18200; 18002
- ISO 3166 code: CP

Taher (Arabic: الطاهير, Al-Tahir; Algerian Arabic: أطًهير), is Algerian city, the industrial center of Jijel Province, with its industrial area of Ouled Salah, the Jijel Ferhat Abbas Airport and the port of Djen Djen.

== Geography ==
=== Situation ===
The municipality of Taher is located in the north of Jijel Province.

=== Localities of the town ===
Taher is composed of several locations:

- Bazoul
- Laajarda
- Belmamouda
- Beni Metrane
- Bouazem
- Laghjara
- Taher
- Bouachir
- Boubzrène
- Boulzazène
- El Kedia
- Dekkara
- Demina
- Aïn El Hammam
- Boulachour
- Boucherka
- Merdj El Bir
- Ouled Salah
- Ouled-Souici
- Oued Nil
- Oum Djelal
- Tablalte
- Dar El Oued
- T'Har oussaf
- Tleta

== History ==
The present city is located on the site of an ancient city - dating back to Ottoman period - it was built on aboriginal lands hunted in the nearby mountains, after the revolt of 1871 (see Mokrani Revolt) time of occupation of Algeria by France, whose population was expropriated, including: the plain of Oued Djen-djen, Telata, the Ouled Bel Afou, Wadi Nile Beni Afar, Beni Siar, Beni khatab, and the immediate vicinity of the current city

== Notable people ==
- Ferhat Abbas, first president of the Provisional Government of the Algerian Republic.
- Dekhli Mokhtar, one fighter of the FLN in Taher and the Algerian east.
- Mohamed Amoura, Footballer striker for Algeria national football team.

== Gallery ==
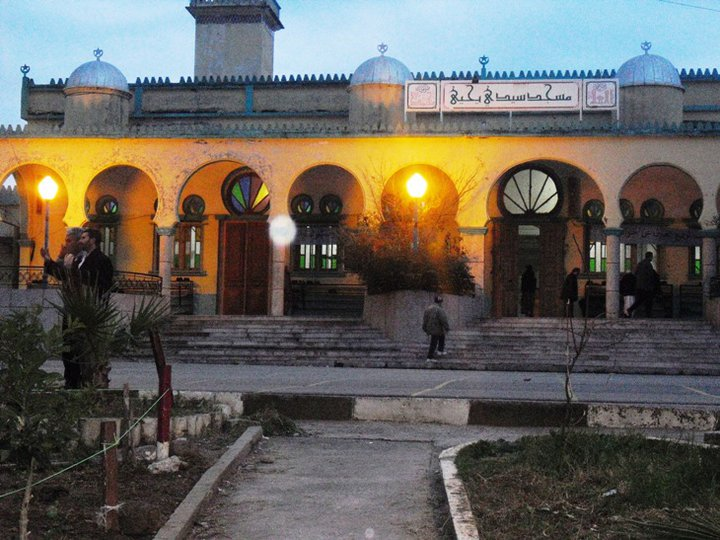
Sidi Yahia Mosque in downtown of Taher.

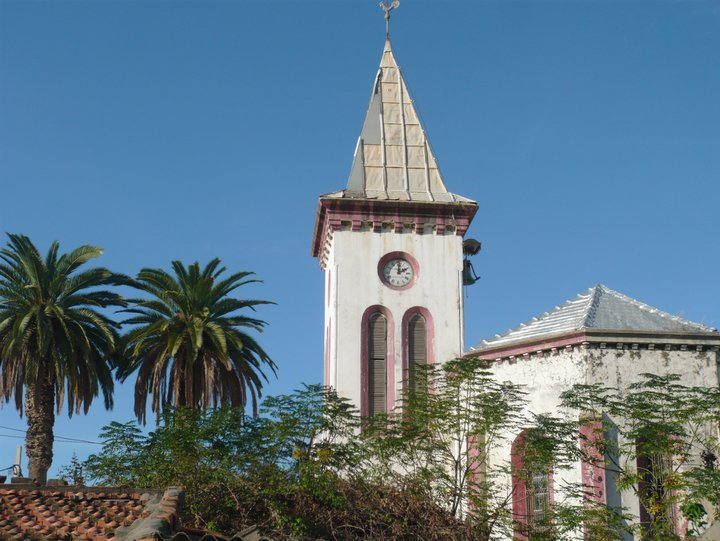
The church Taher.

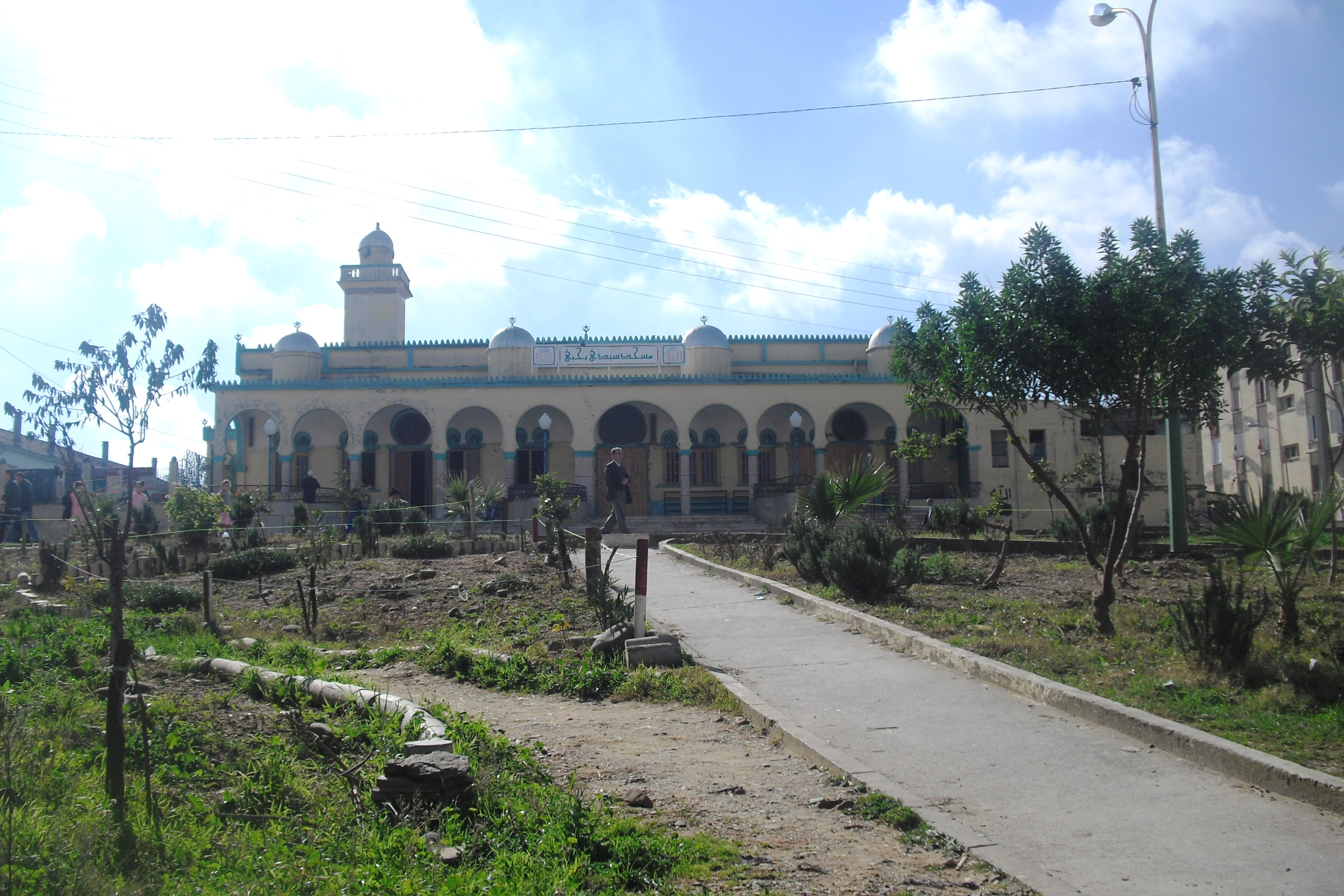
Sidi Yahia Mosque in downtown of Taher.

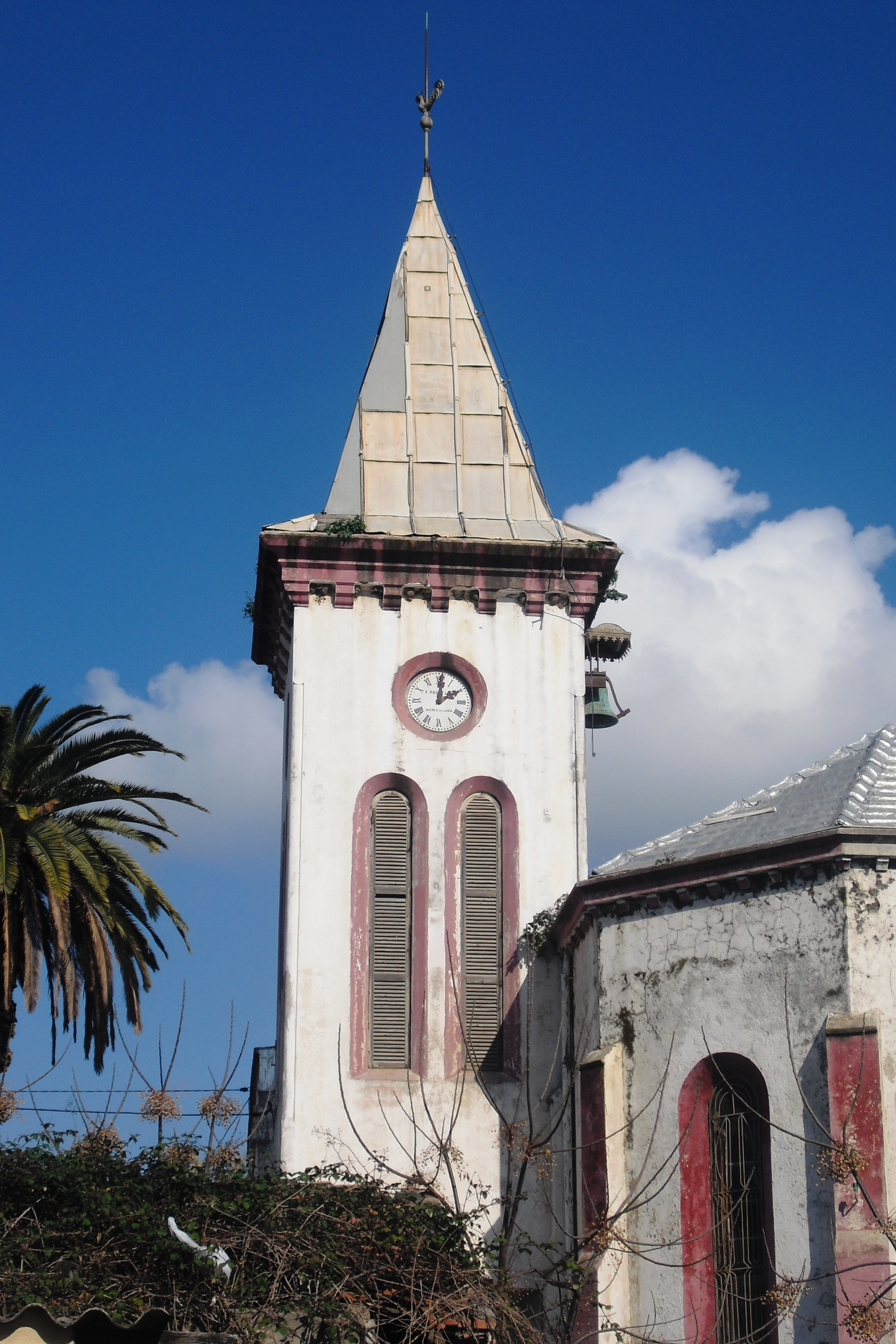
The church Taher (Downtown).
