= Jijel Province =

Province of Algeria

Jijel Province ولاية جيجل
- Province
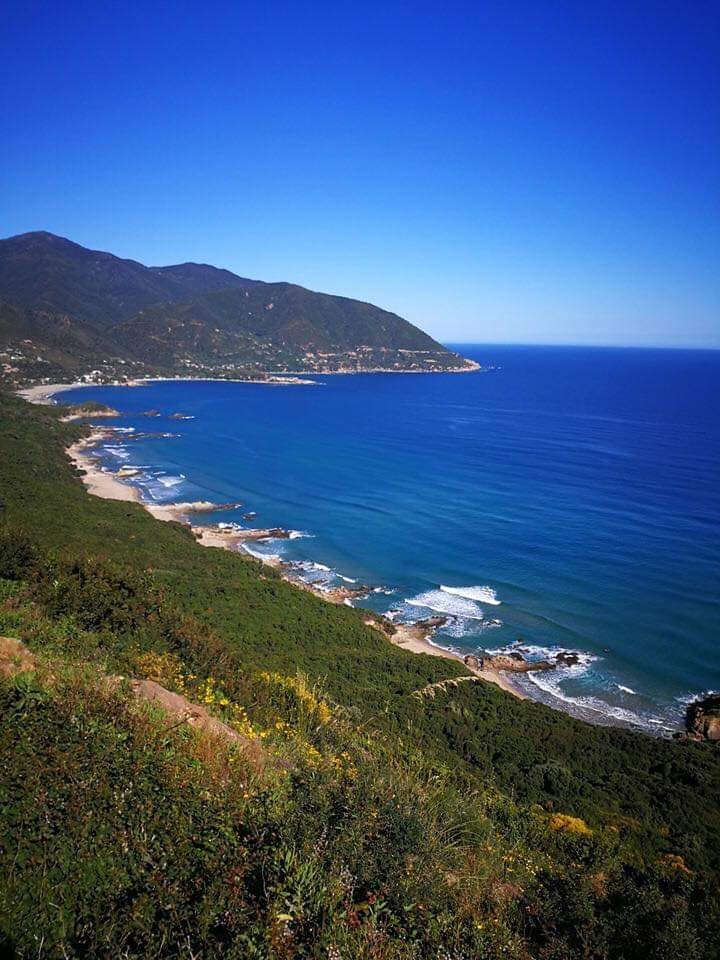

- Map of Algeria highlighting Jijel
- Coordinates: 36°48′N 5°46′E
- Country: Algeria
- Capital: Jijel

Area
  - Total: 2,577 km^{2} (995 sq mi)

Population (2008)
  - Total: 634,412
  - Density: 246.2/km^{2} (637.6/sq mi)
- Time zone: UTC+01 (CET)
- Area Code: +213 (0) 34
- ISO 3166 code: DZ-18
- Districts: 11
- Municipalities: 28

Jijel (Arabic: ولاية جيجل) is a province (wilaya) in Algeria, on the eastern Mediterranean coast. The capital is Jijel (Phoenician name : Igilgili). Taza National Park is located in this province.

== History ==
The province was created from parts of Constantine (department) and Sétif (département) in 1974.

In 1984 Mila Province was carved out of its territory.

== Administrative divisions ==
The province is divided into 11 districts, which are further divided into 28 communes or municipalities.

=== Districts ===
1. Chekfa
2. Djimla
3. El Ancer
4. El Aouana
5. El Milia
6. Jijel
7. Settara
8. Sidi Maârouf
9. Taher
10. Texenna
11. Ziama Mansouriah

=== Communes ===
1. Bordj T'har
2. Boucif Ouled Askeur
3. Boudriaa Ben Yadjis
4. Bouraoui Belhadef
5. Chahna
6. Chekfa
7. Djemaa Beni Habibi
8. Djimla
9. El Ancer
10. El Aouana
11. El Kennar Nouchfi
12. El Milia
13. Emir Abdelkader
14. Eraguene
15. Ghebala
16. Jijel
17. Kaous
18. Kheïri Oued Adjoul
19. Ouadjana
20. Ouled Rabah
21. Ouled Yahia Khedrouche
22. Selma Benziada
23. Settara
24. Sidi Abdelaziz
25. Sidi Maarouf
26. Taher
27. Texenna
28. Ziama Mansouriah

== See also ==
- Jijel Arabic – Pre-Hilalian Arabic dialect of northeastern Algeria
