= Sidi Maârouf =

Coordinates: 33°31′N 7°39′W

Sidi Maarouf is a neighborhood of Casablanca, Morocco.

Since 1993, several multinationals have set up their headquarters in this area of Casablanca due to its strategical location around the major N11 Route and the Sidi Maarouf Bridge, which opened in 2019.
