= Djimla =

Coordinates: 36°34′53″N 5°53′06″E

- Commune and town
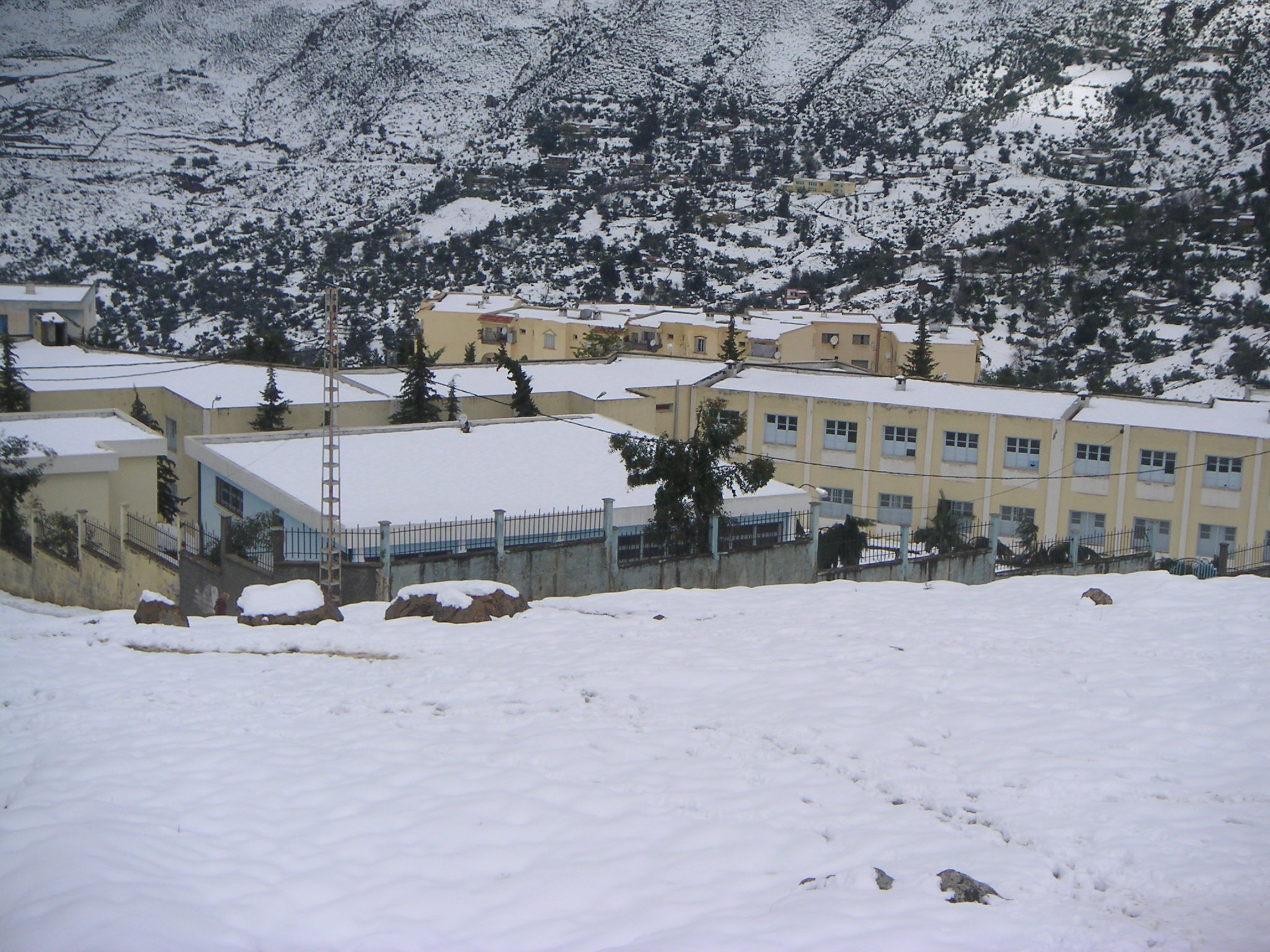

- Country: Algeria
- Province: Jijel Province

Population (1998)
  - Total: 15,513
- Time zone: UTC+1 (CET)

Djimla is a town and commune in Jijel Province, Algeria. According to the 1998 census it has a population of 15,513.
