= Settara =

Coordinates: 36°43′N 6°20′E

- Commune and town
- Country: Algeria
- Province: Jijel Province

Population (1998)
  - Total: 13,748
- Time zone: UTC+1 (CET)

Settara is a town and commune in Jijel Province, Algeria. According to the 1998 census it has a population of 13,748.
