= Boucif Ouled Askeur =

- Commune and town

- Location within Algeria
- Country: Algeria
- Province: Jijel Province
- Time zone: UTC+1 (CET)

Boucif Ouled Askeur is a town and commune in Jijel Province, Algeria. It has a population of 13,416 and covers 101 square kilometers.
