= Oudjana =

Coordinates: 36°42′26″N 5°53′42″E

Ouadjana
- Commune and town
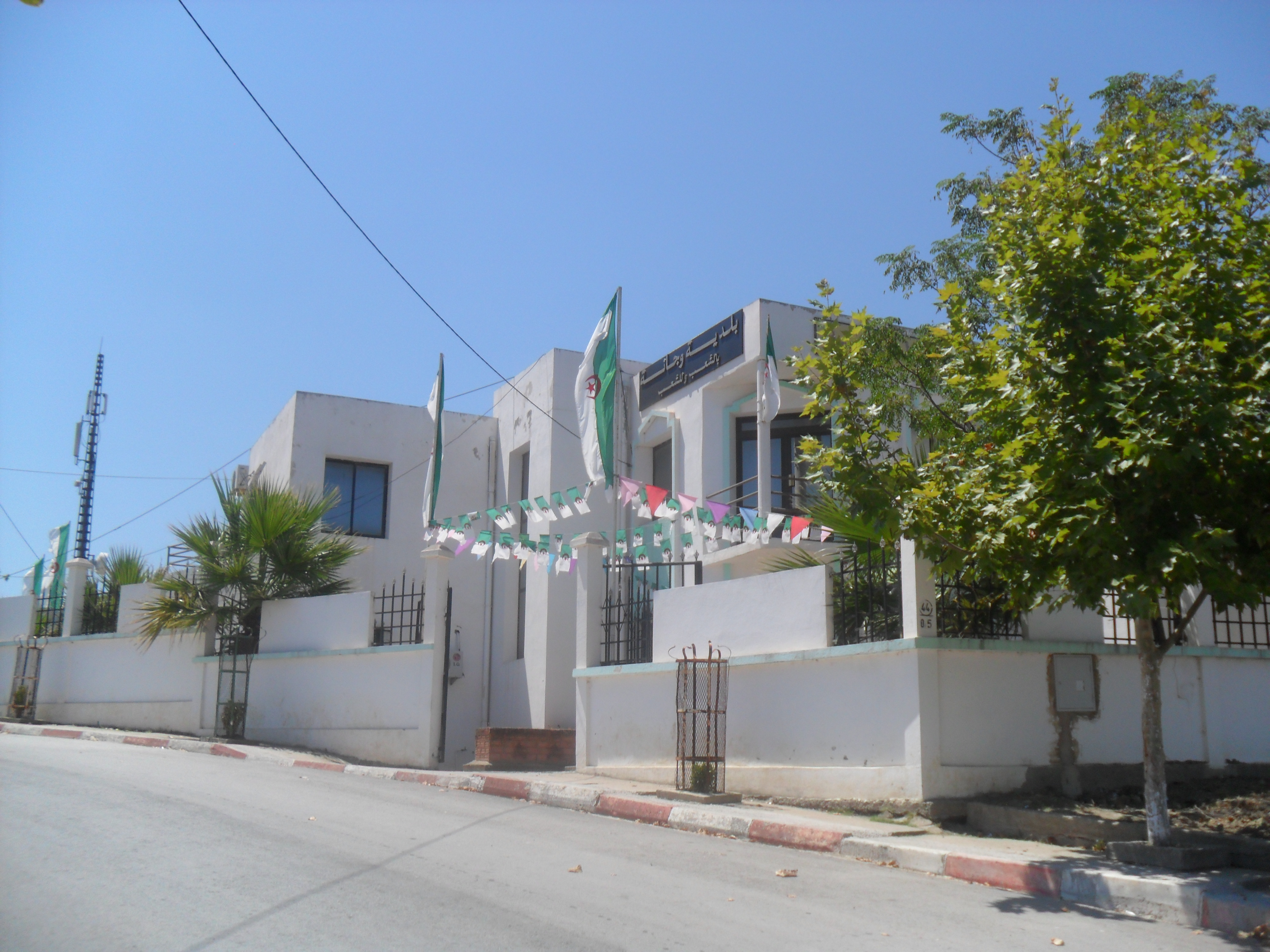

- Country: Algeria
- Province: Jijel Province

Population (1998)
  - Total: 8,612
- Time zone: UTC+1 (CET)

Ouadjana is a town and commune in Jijel Province, Algeria. According to the 1998 census it has a population of 8612.
