= Emir Abdelkader, Jijel =

Emir Abdelkader الأمير عبد القادر
- Commune and town
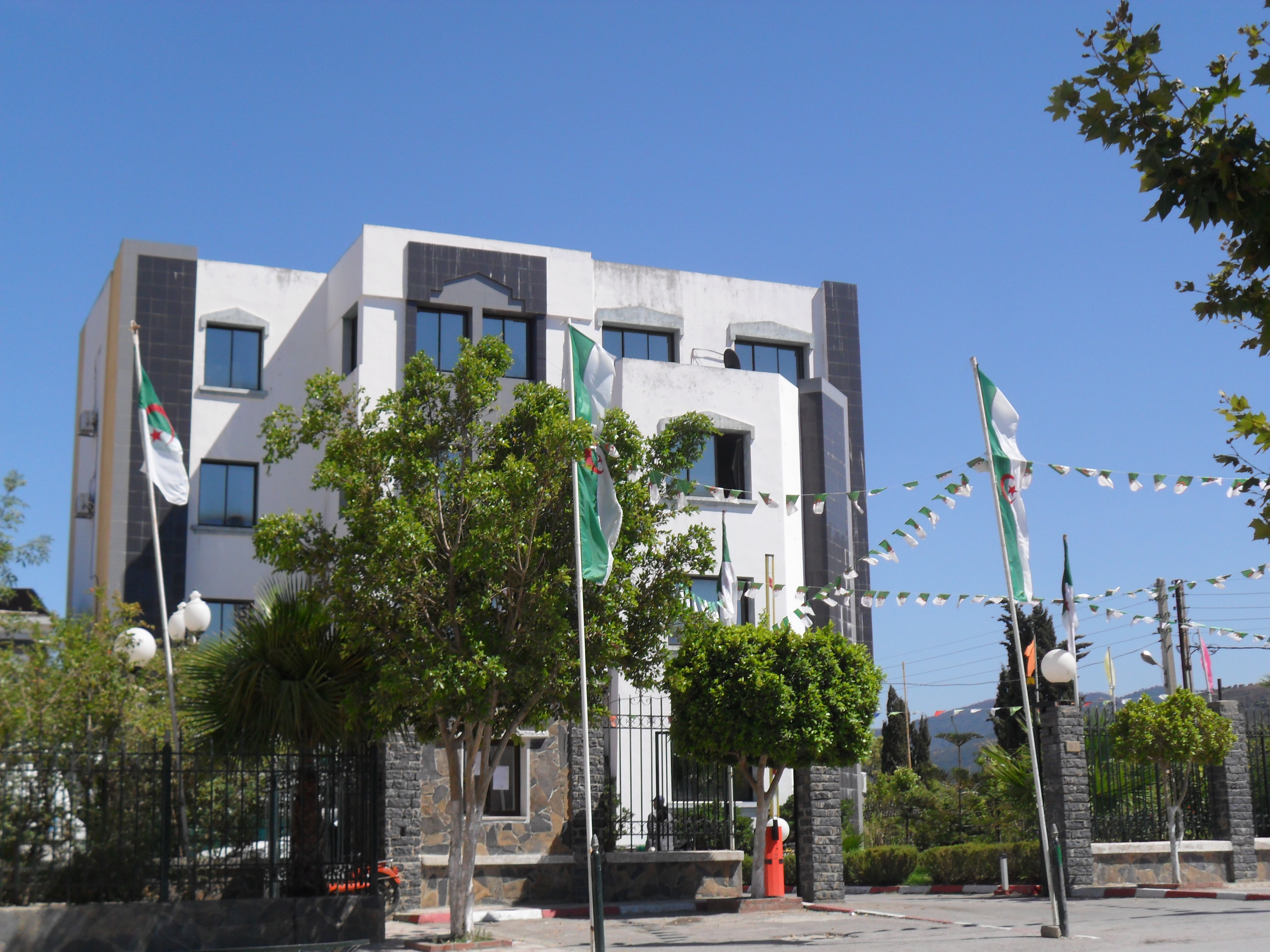
- Emir Abdelkader center

- Location of Taher in the Jijel Province

- Location within Algeria
- Coordinates: 36°45′N 005°50′E
- Country: Algeria
- Province: Jijel Province
- APC: 2012-2017

Government
  - Type: Municipality

Population (2008)
  - Total: 38,468
- Time zone: UTC+1 (CET)

Emir Abdelkader, Jijel is a town and commune in Jijel Province, Algeria. According to the 1998 census it has a population of 31,870.

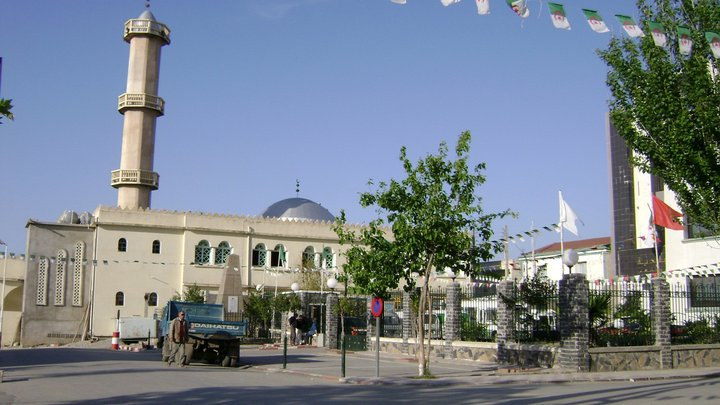
Emir Abdelkader mosque.
