= El Kennar Nouchfi =

Coordinates: 36°49′27″N 5°57′44″E

El Kennar Nouchfi القنار نشفي
- Commune and town
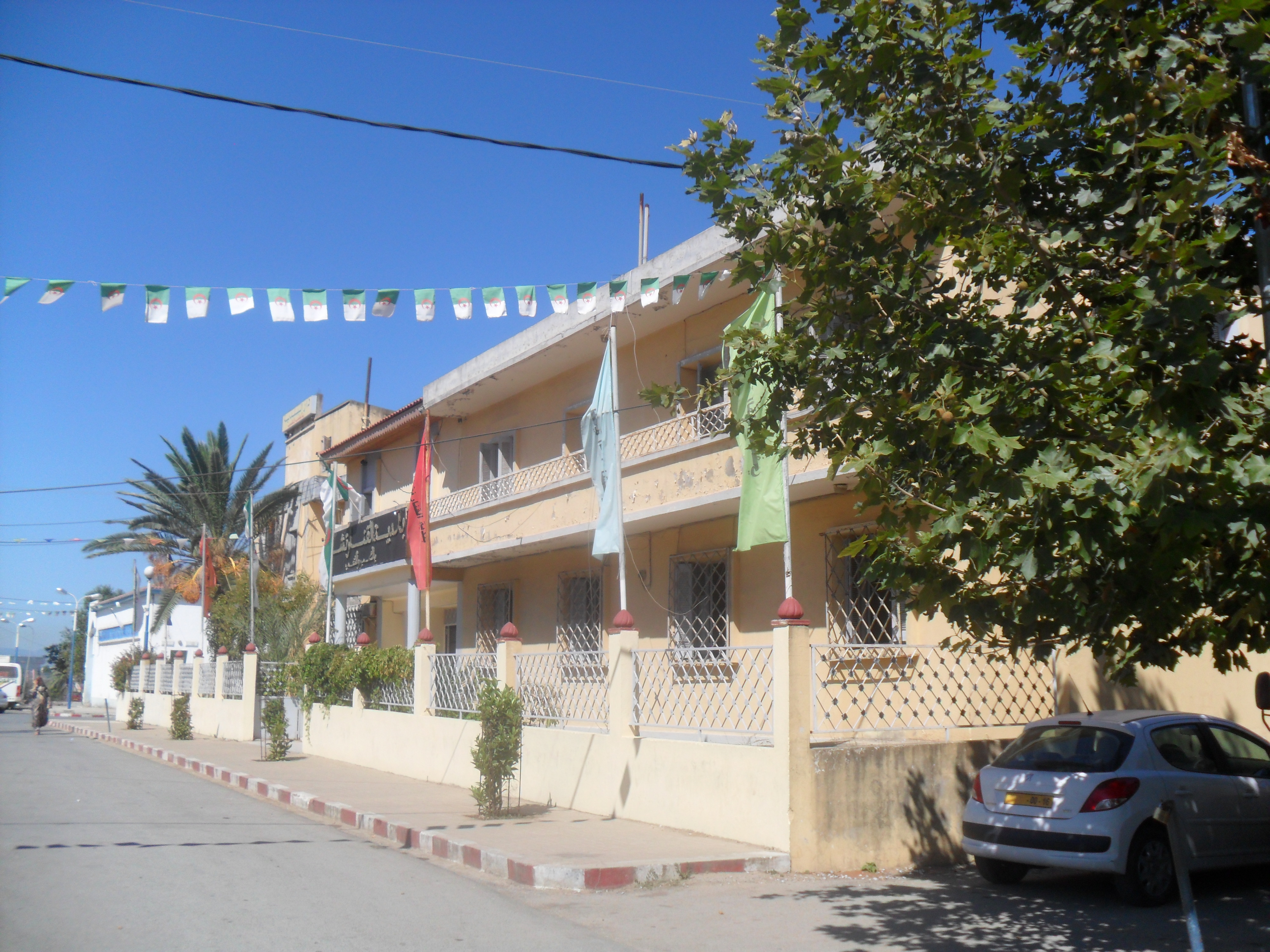

- Country: Algeria
- Province: Jijel Province

Population (1998)
  - Total: 13,747
- Time zone: UTC+1 (CET)

El Kennar Nouchfi is a town and commune in Jijel Province, Algeria. According to the 1998 census it has a population of 13,748.
