= Ghebala =

Ghebala KARIATE GARFI AMMAR BENI TLILANE
- Commune and town
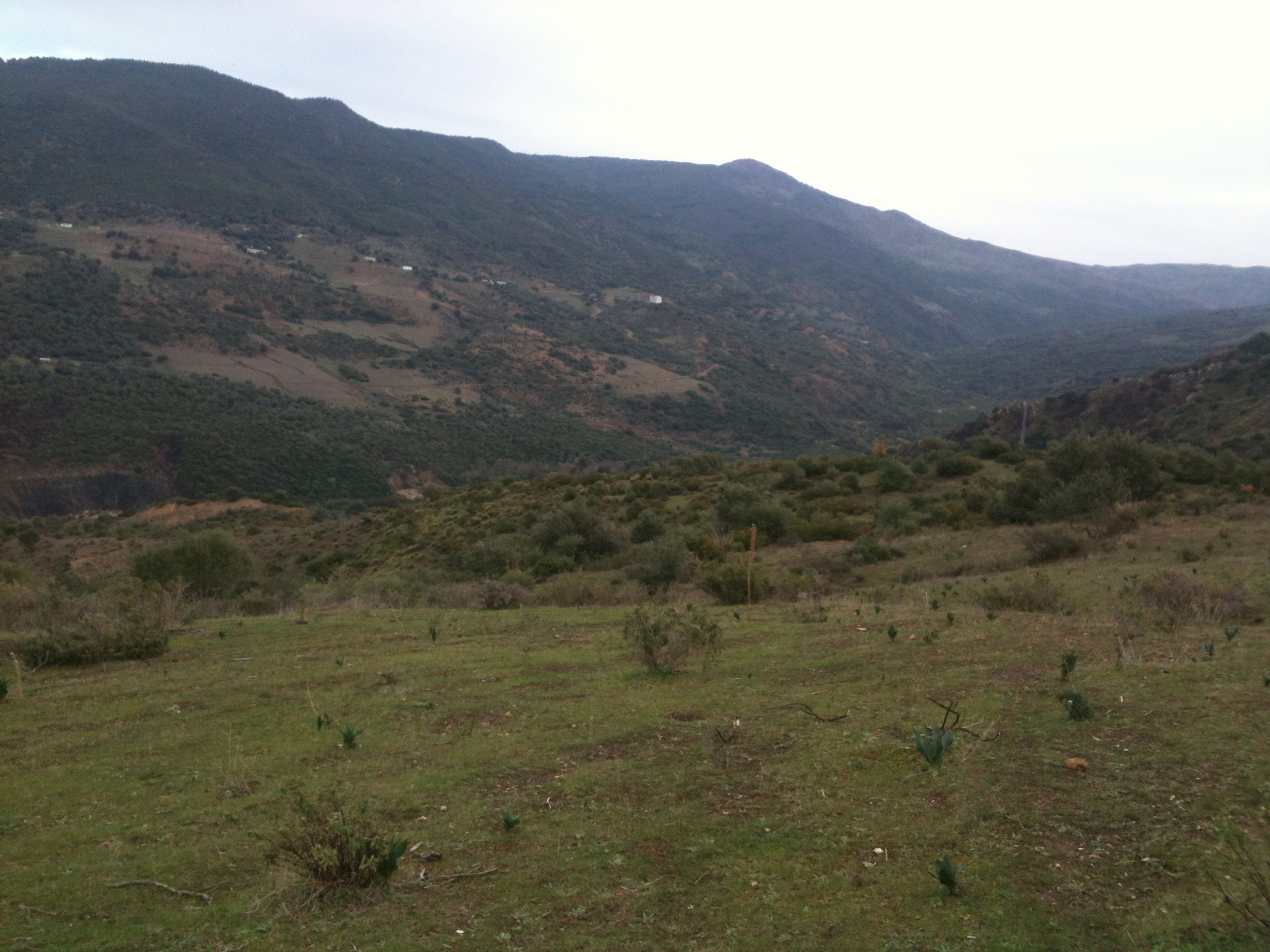
- Nickname: BOUAMAMA

- Location within Algeria
- Country: Algeria
- Province: Jijel Province

Population (1998)
  - Total: 5,228
- Time zone: UTC+1 (CET)

Ghebala is a town and commune in Jijel Province, Algeria. According to the 1998 census it has a population of 5,228.
