= Ziama Mansouriah =

Ziama Mansouria زيامة منصورية
- Commune and town
- Location of Ziama Mansouria in the Jijel Province

- Location of Ziama Mansouria in Algeria
- Coordinates: 36°40′25″N 5°28′5″E
- Country: Algeria
- Province: Jijel Province

Population (2008)
  - Total: 12,642
- Time zone: UTC+1 (CET)
- Postal code: 18110

Ziama Mansouria is a town and commune in Jijel Province, Algeria. According to the 2008 census it has a population of 12,642.

== History ==
In Roman times, the Ancient city was called Cova or Choba and belonged to the Roman province of Mauretania Sitifensis.

It was important enough to become a suffragan bishopric. Bishop Maximus of Cova was one of the Catholic bishops whom the Arian Vandal king Huneric summoned to Carthage in 484 and then exiled.

== Titular see of Cova ==
No longer a residential bishopric, Cova is today listed by the Catholic Church as a titular see.

The ancient diocese was nominally restored in 1933 as a titular bishopric, the lowest class, and since had the following near-consecutive incumbents :

- Emmanuel Otteh (1990.06.11 – 1996.11.08)
- José Luis Chávez Botello (1997.02.21 – 2001.07.16), later Metropolitan Archbishop of Antequera (Mexico)
- Joe S. Vásquez (2001.11.30 – 2010.01.26, as Auxiliary Bishop of Galveston–Houston), later Bishop of Austin (also in Texas, USA 2010.01.26 – ...)
- J. Douglas Deshotel, Auxiliary Bishop of Dallas (2010.03.11 – 2016.02.17), named Bishop of the Roman Catholic Diocese of Lafayette in Louisiana by Pope Francis
- Neil Edward Tiedemann (2016.4.29 - Present) Auxiliary Bishop of Brooklyn

== Source and External links ==
- GigaCatholic, with titular incumbent biography links
