= Selma Benziada =

Coordinates: 36°37′35″N 5°38′54″E

- Commune and town
- Country: Algeria
- Province: Jijel Province

Population (1998)
  - Total: 1,564
- Time zone: UTC+1 (CET)

Selma Benziada is a town and commune in Jijel Province, Algeria. According to the 1998 census it has a population of 1,564.
