= El Aouana =

El Aouana العوانة Cavallo
- Commune and town
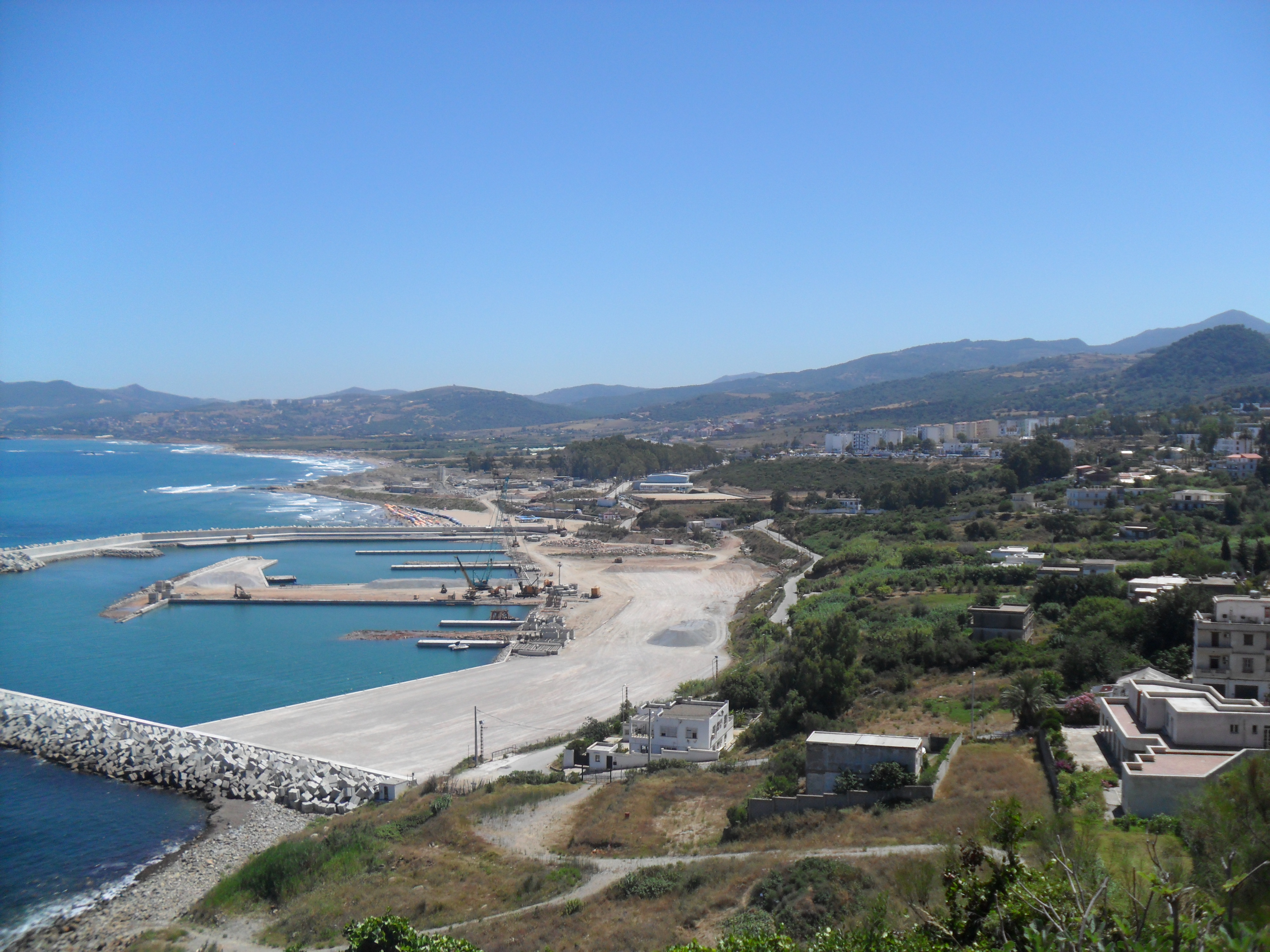

- Location within Algeria
- Coordinates: 36.7727264°N 5.6099603°E
- Country: Algeria
- Province: Jijel Province

Population (1998)
  - Total: 12,384
- Time zone: UTC+1 (CET)

El Aouana (Latin : Cavallo) is a town and commune in Jijel Province, Algeria. According to the 1998 census it has a population of 12,384. It is famous for the discovery of four Dolmen by the French.
