= Boudriaa Ben Yadjis =

- Commune and town
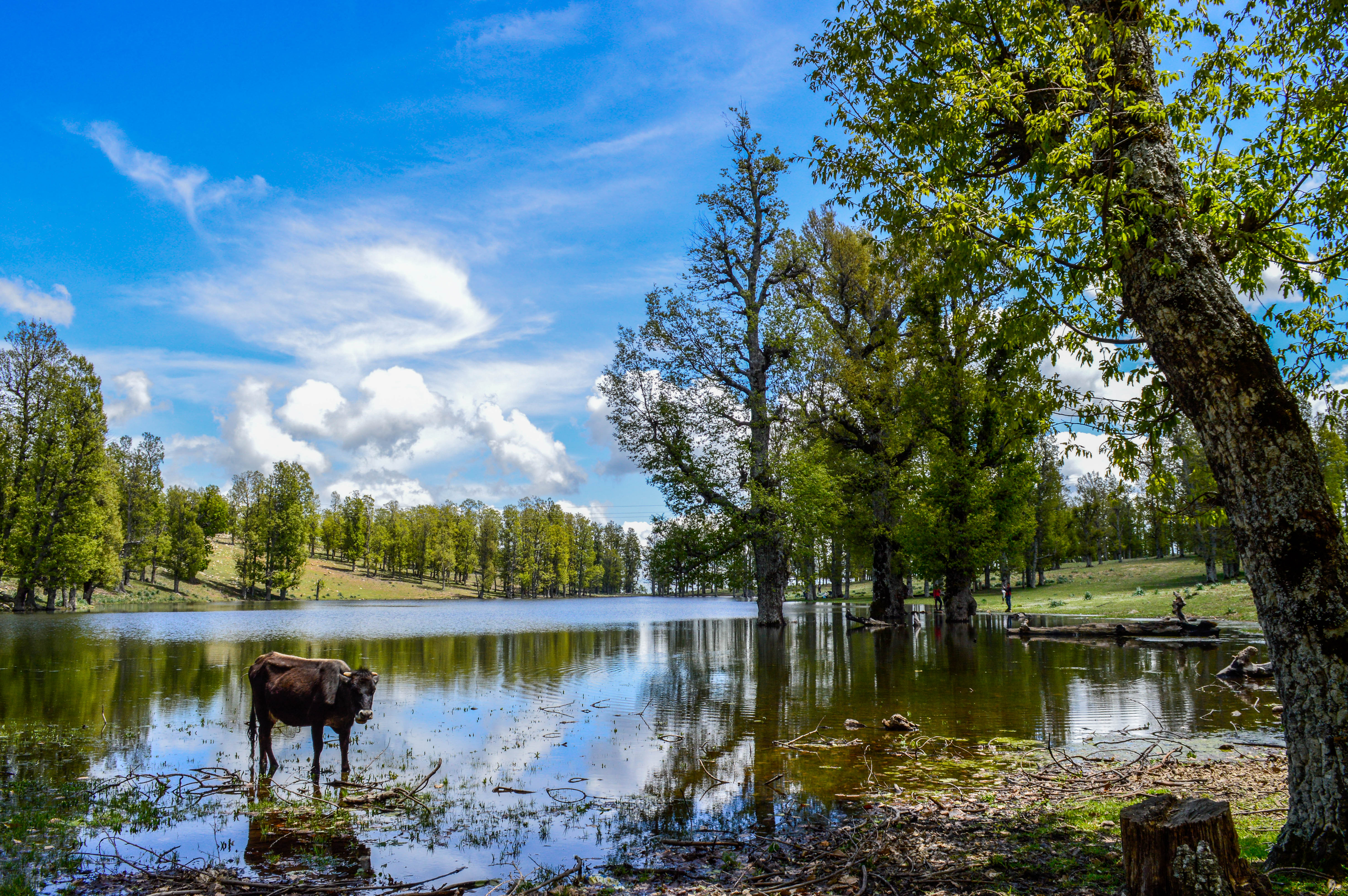

- Location within Algeria
- Country: Algeria
- Province: Jijel Province

Population (1998)
  - Total: 10,352
- Time zone: UTC+1 (CET)

Boudriaa Ben Yadjis is a town and commune in Jijel Province, Algeria. According to the 1998 census it has a population of 10,352.
