= Ouled Yahia Khedrouche =

- Commune and town
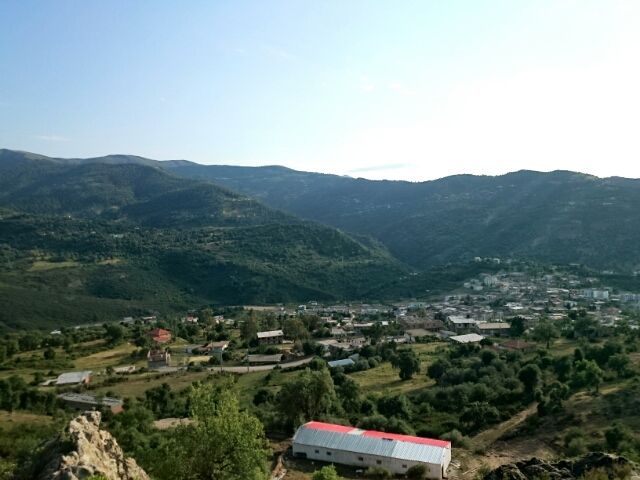

- Location within Algeria
- Country: Algeria
- Province: Jijel Province

Population (1998)
  - Total: 17,559
- Time zone: UTC+1 (CET)

Ouled Yahia Khedrouche is a town and commune in Jijel Province, Algeria. According to the 1998 census it has a population of 17,599.
