= El Milia =

El Milia الميلية
- Commune and town
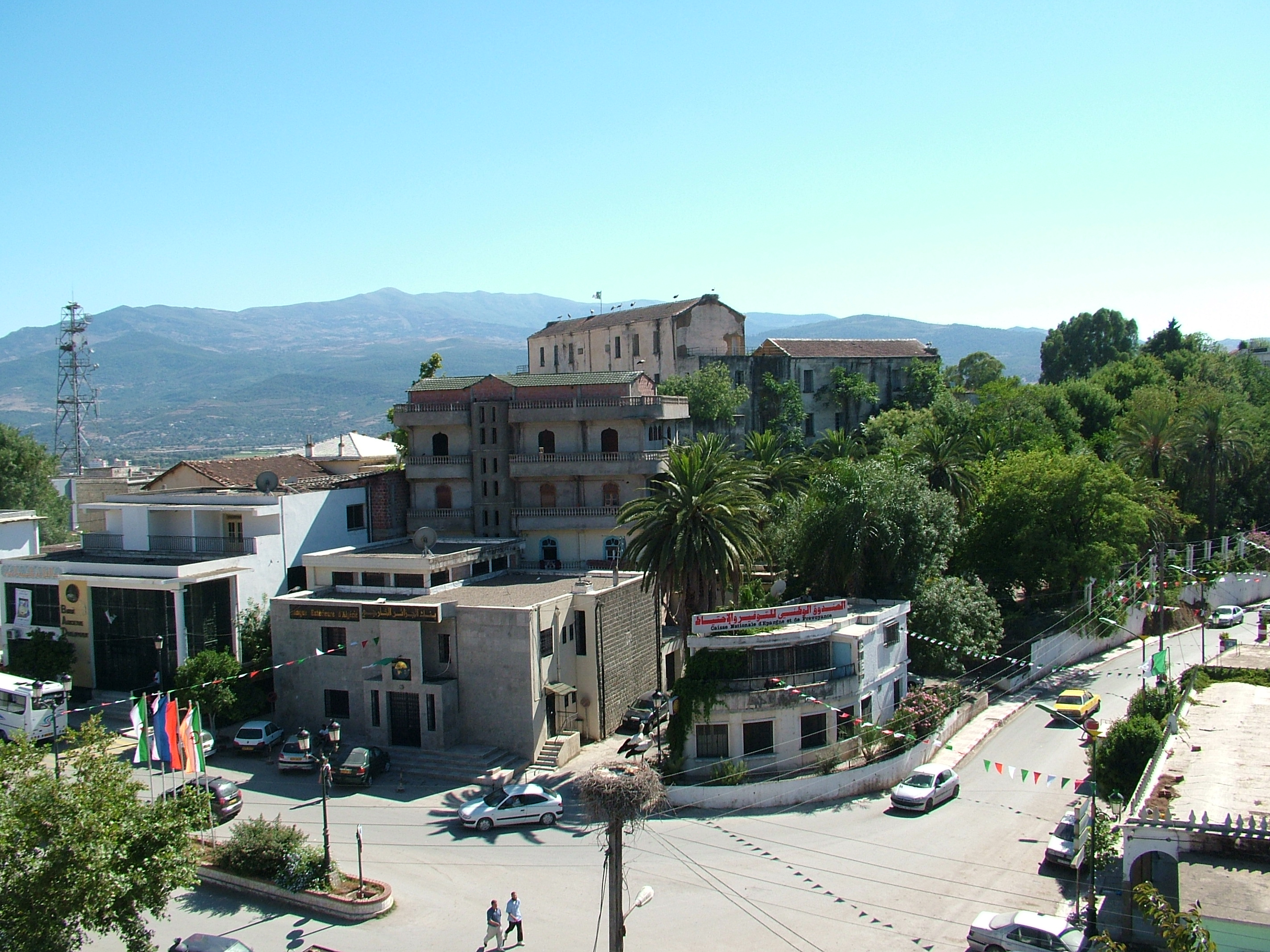

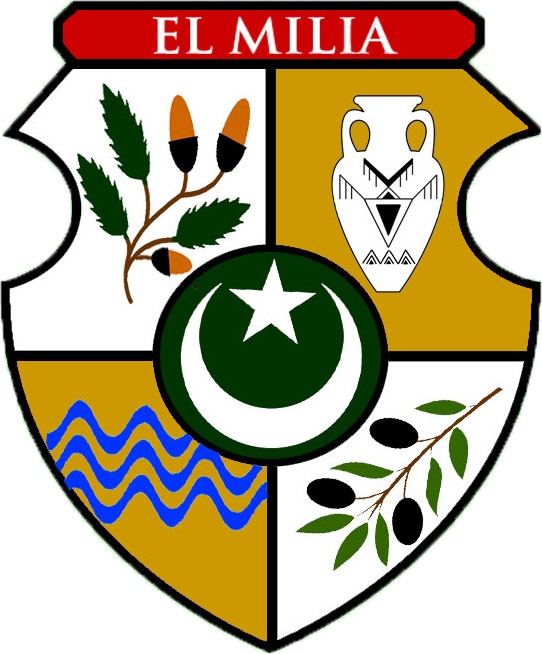
- Seal

- Location within Algeria
- Country: Algeria
- Province: Jijel Province
- District: El Milia District

Population (2009)
  - Total: 80,000
- Time zone: UTC+1 (CET)

El Milia (الميلية) is a town and commune in Jijel Province, Algeria.

The town of El Milia is located in the north-eastern Constantinois region. It lies between the cities of Jijel, Mila, Constantine and Skikda. The Mediterranean Sea is about twenty kilometers north of the town. The territory of the municipality of El Milia is located northeast of the province of Jijel. It is the largest city area of the region.

== Administration ==
The municipality of El Milia is composed of one hundred and one localities, villages and hamlets.

El Milia is the eponymous capital of El Milia District.

== Population ==
According to the 2009 census it has a population of 80,000.

The term used to refer to the Arabic-speaking highlanders in the region of El Milia was Kabyle hadra. The ethnic origin of these is that the first inhabitants of the region were the Kutama Berbers. In the 11th century, following the overthrow of the Fatimid empire and the fall of the Arab, a settlement was founded by various Berbers who came from other regions of Algeria, particularly the highlands, and from Morocco. They moved to El Milia and its surroundings, but never mixed with Hilali Arab tribes, and later Muslim refugees from Andalusia expelled from Spain. There was also more recently a small Ottoman influx.

Among the tribes that are in the city of El Milia and the region: Ouled Aidoun, Fergane Beni, Beni Belaid, Beni Meslim, Tileman, Feteh Beni, Beni Aicha, Beni Khettab, Ouled Ali, Ouled Aouat, Ouled Boufaha, Mechat El Achache, Beni Caid, Ouled Mbareek, Telilane Beni and Beni Sbih.

== History ==
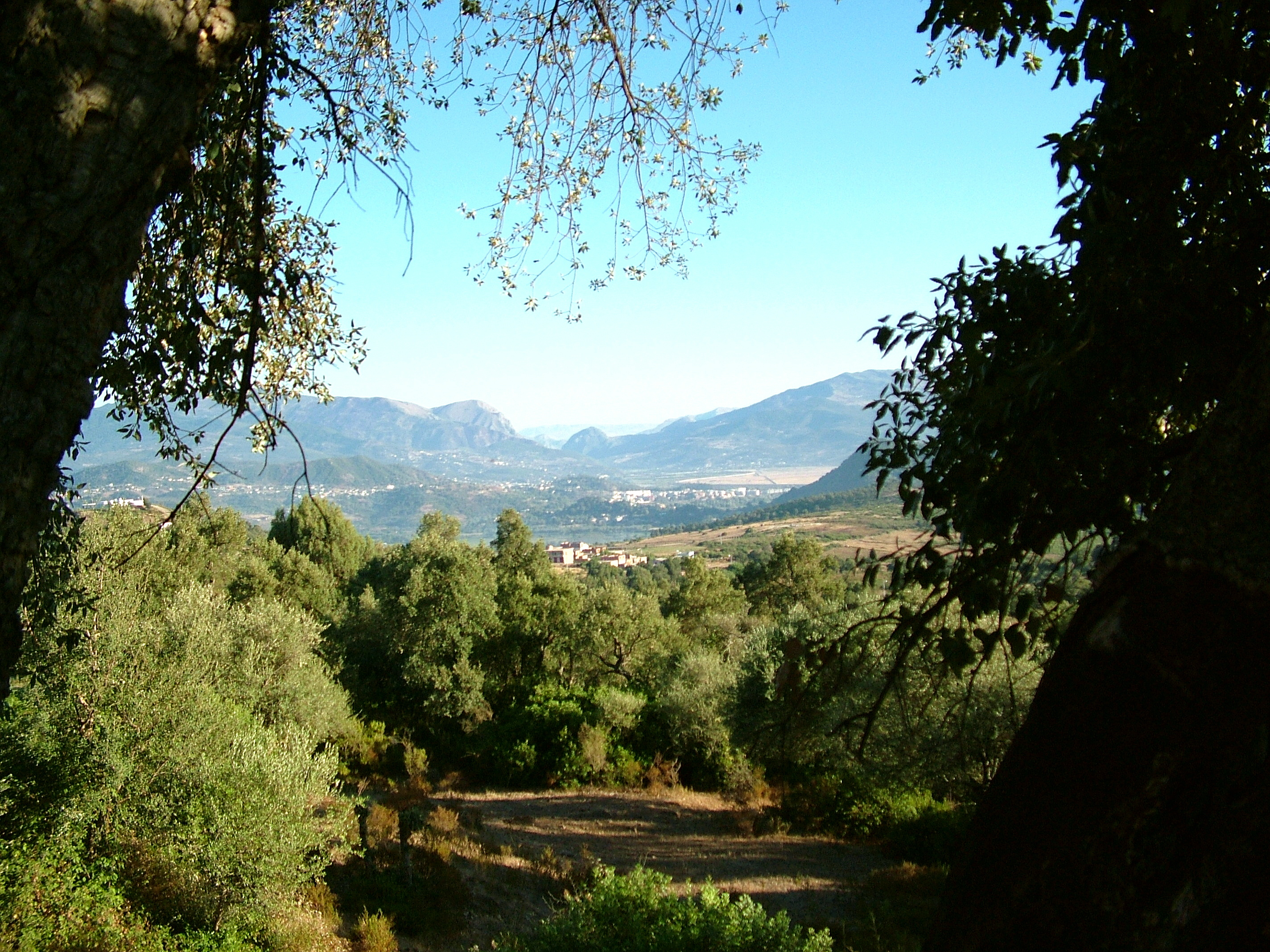
Hills of El Milia

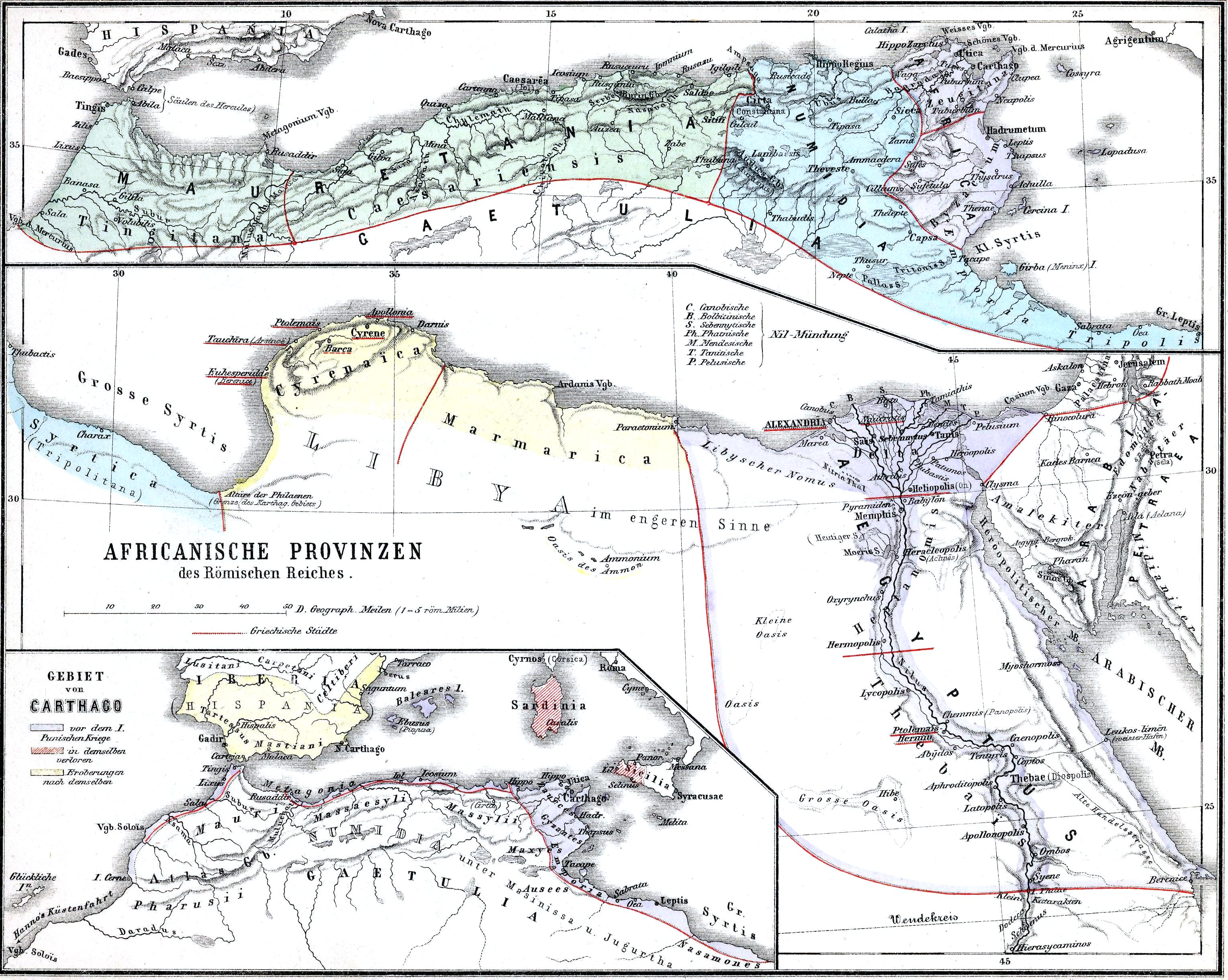
Roman North Africa

El Milia takes its name from the ancient city and Roman bishopric (see below) Mulia.

Home to many battles against French colonists, the region is one of the pillars of the war of independence and the fight against French colonial army.

Only small, isolated mechtas existed in the area until 1860 when a small town was built, under the direction of the department of Constantine, in order to subdue the tribe of Ouled Aidoun. Under the French occupation the area was part of Kabylia East. Together with the new town came a borj (fortress) to control the Ouled Aidoun. The tribe, humiliated and ruined by new taxes, held a meeting and decided to attack the next day at dawn and take control of the French military tower. This revolt of February 14, 1871 marked the beginning of a general armed uprising (the Mokrani Revolt) in eastern Kabylie.

The uprising that took place in two phases lasting about 9 months, during which the French camp was destroyed, and the tower besieged for over a week. The French occupation forces then mobilized some 10,000 soldiers to try to quell the uprising, and their superiority in armaments gave them the upper hand. In retaliation against the population, the French imposed additional taxes, confiscated land and enacted arrests and deportations.

During the War of Independence, the tribes of the region of El Milia, then part of the historic wilaya II of North Constantine, played a large role in the fight against the settlers, particularly in the attacks of 20 August 1955. On that day and the days that followed, the French colonial troops suffered huge losses. This impelled Youcef Zighoud to declare "If we lost militarily and won politically in north-eastern Constantine, that is to say in Skikda and its periphery, I can tell you that we won both militarily and politically in the northwest of Constantine, particularly in El Milia. "

== Ecclesiastical history ==
Mulia was among the many towns in the Roman province of Numidia, in the papal sway, that were important enough to become a suffragan diocese.

It only historically documented bishop was Peregrinus, participant at the synod called at Carthage by king Huneric of the Vandal Kingdom in 484, after which he was exiled like most Catholic bishops, unlike their heretical Donatist counterparts.

Morcelli list a second Latin bishop (in 393), whom Mesnage and Jaubert assign to the diocese of Mutia.

=== Titular see ===
The Diocese of Mulia was nominally restored in 1925 as Latin titular bishopric of Mulia (Latin = Curiate Italian) / Mulien(sis) (Latin adjective)

It has had the following incumbents, so far of the fitting Episcopal (lowest) rank :

- Odilon Fages, Oblate Missionaries of Saint Francis de Sales (O.S.F.S.) (born France) (15 June 1928 - 14 Oct 1939) as Coadjutor Vicar Apostolic of Orange River (South Africa) (1928.06.15 – 1932.11.21); next succeeded as last Apostolic Vicar of Orange River (later Diocese of Keimoes, South Africa) (1932.11.21 – death 1939.10.14)
- István Fiedler (15 Dec 1939 - death 25 Oct 1957) as emeritate; formerly Bishop of Oradea Mare (Romania) (1930.10.16 – 1939.12.15) and Bishop of Satu Mare (Romania) (1930.10.16 – 1939.12.15)
- Theodorus van den Tillaart, Divine Word Missionaries (S.V.D.) (14 Nov 1957 - 3 Jan 1961) as last Apostolic Vicar of Atambua (Indonesia) (1957.11.14 – 1961.01.03), next (see) promoted first Bishop of Atambua (1961.01.03 – retired 1984.02.03), died 1991
- Guy-Marie-Joseph Riobé (22 July 1961 - 23 May 1963) as Coadjutor Bishop of Orléans (France) (1961.07.22 – 1963.05.23), next succeeded as Bishop of Orléans (1963.05.23 – death 1978.07.18)
- Waldyr Calheiros Novaes (25 Feb 1964 - 20 Oct 1966) as Auxiliary Bishop of Archdiocese of São Sebastião do Rio de Janeiro (Brazil) (1964.02.25 – 1966.10.20); next Bishop of Barra do Piraí–Volta Redonda (Brazil) (1966.10.20 – retired 1999.11.17), died 2013
- Oswald Thomas Colman Gomis (9 April 1968 - 2 Nov 1995) as Auxiliary Bishop of Archdiocese of Colombo (Sri Lanka) (1968.04.09 – 1995.11.02); next Bishop of Anuradhapura (Sri Lanka) (1995.11.02 – 2002.07.06), President of Bishops' Conference of Sri Lanka (1998 – 2004), President of Federation of Asian Bishops' Conferences (2000 – 2005), Metropolitan Archbishop of above Colombo (2002.07.06 – retired 2009.06.16)
- John Raymond Manz (23 Jan 1996 - ...) as Auxiliary Bishop of Archdiocese of Chicago (Illinois, USA) (1996.01.23 – ...)

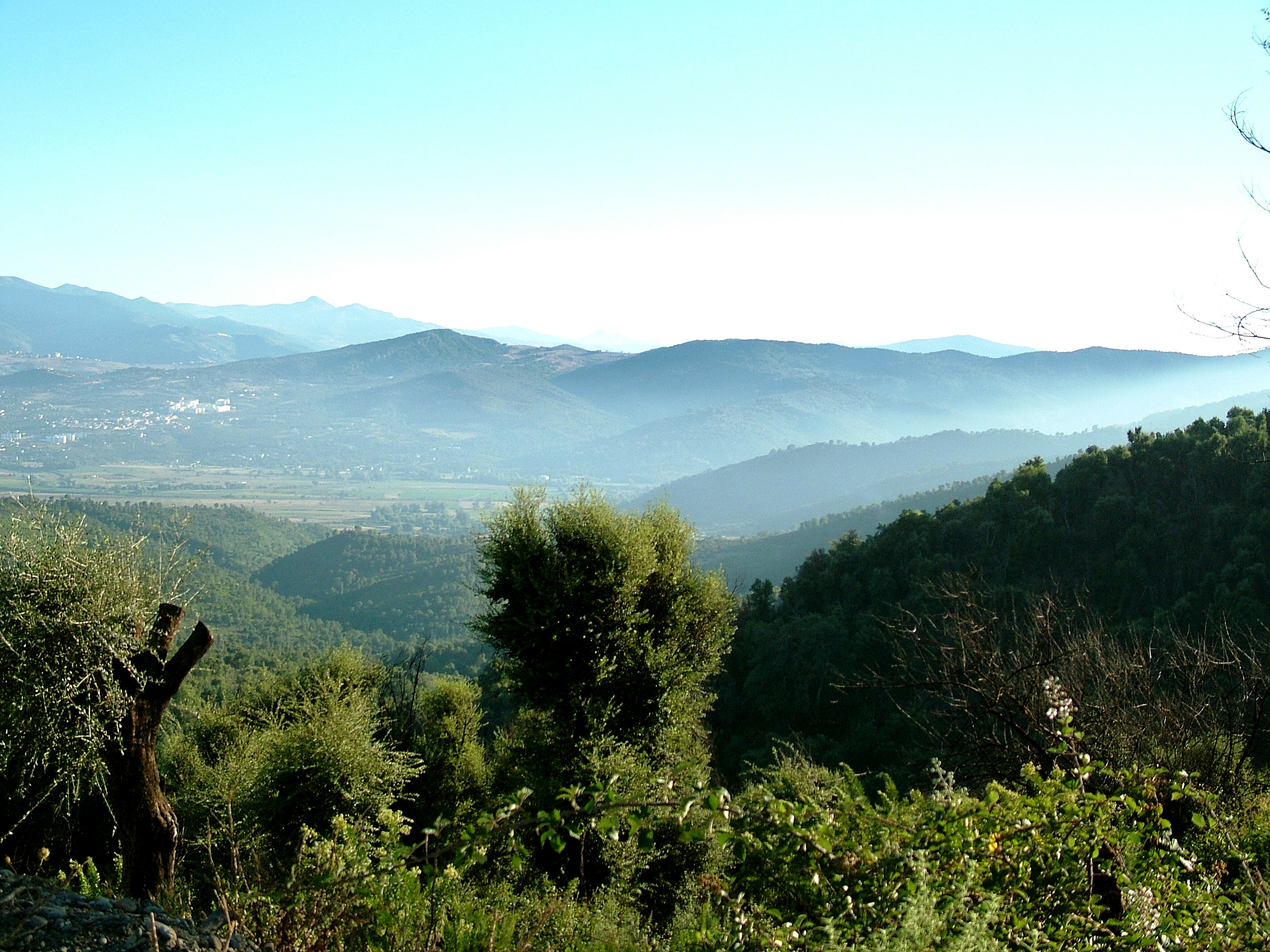
area of El Milia.

== Geography ==
The region of El Milia is characterized by a very rugged mountainous terrain, mountains occupy 82% of the total area, they peak at 1200 m. Characterized by a pristine coastline and small mountains covered by dense enough vegetation and water sources.

- The lowland areas, located in the valleys of Oued el Kebir Oued Boussiaba and small plains of Oued Z'hour.
- Areas of mountains, located around the city. These are characterized by abundant vegetation cover and a network of rivers.

=== Climate ===
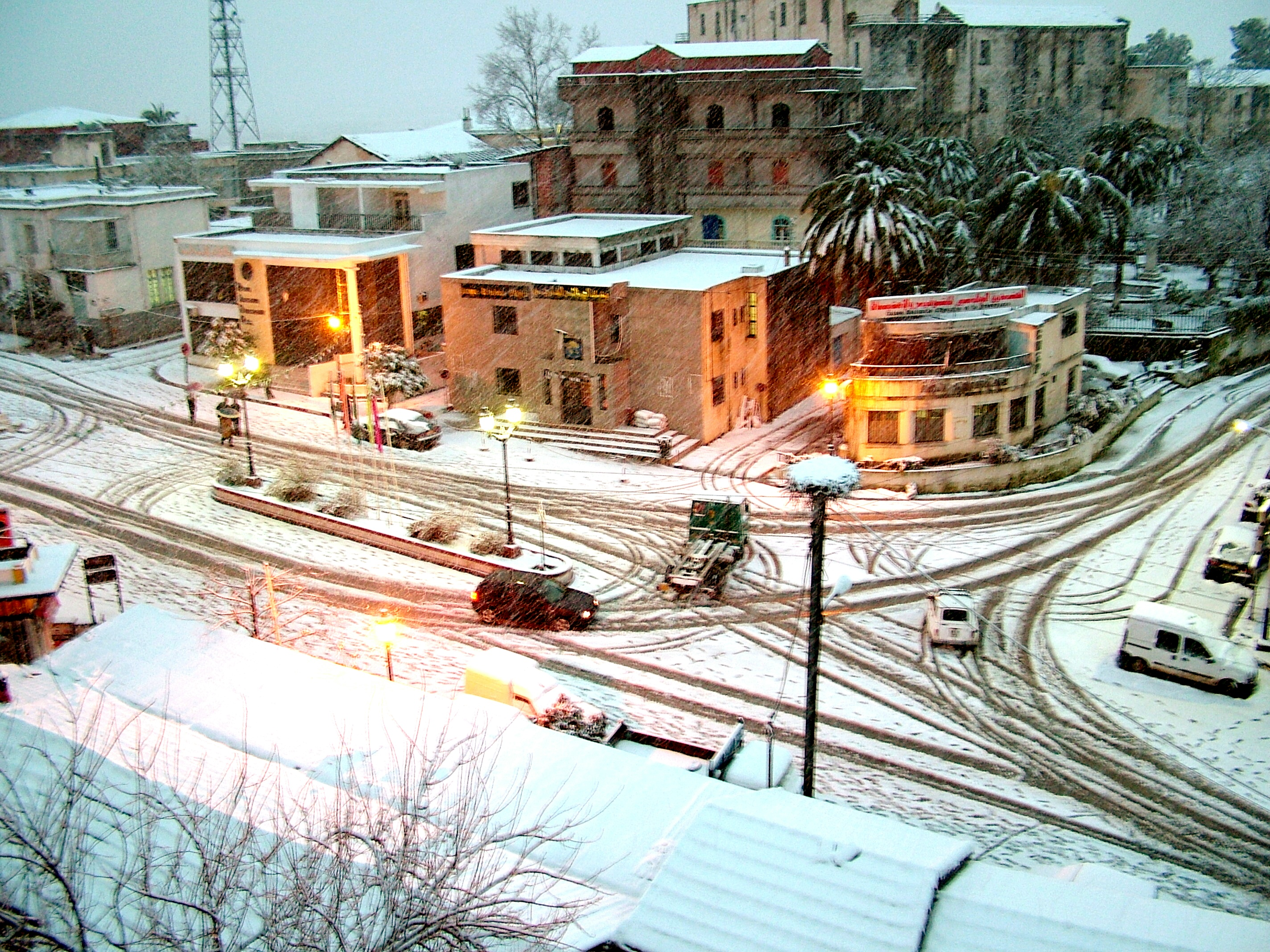
El Milia in winter

The El Milia region has a Mediterranean climate characterized by warm summers and mild winters but is very humid. The temperature varies from 0c° in winter to 40c° in summer.

== See also ==
- List of Catholic dioceses in Algeria

== Sources and external links ==
- GCatholic - (titular) bishopric

Bibliography - ecclesiastical history

- Pius Bonifacius Gams, Series episcoporum Ecclesiae Catholicae, Leipzig 1931, p. 467
- Stefano Antonio Morcelli, Africa christiana, Volume I, Brescia 1816, p. 233
- J. Mesnage, L'Afrique chrétienne, Paris 1912, pp. 423–424
- H. Jaubert, Anciens évêchés et ruines chrétiennes de la Numidie et de la Sitifienne, in Recueil des Notices et Mémoires de la Société archéologique de Constantine, vol. 46, 1913, p. 64
