= Ouled Rabah =

Coordinates: 36°17′N 3°08′E

Ouled Rabah أولاد رابح Beni khattab
- Commune and town
- Country: Algeria
- Province: Jijel Province

Population (1998)
  - Total: 10,142
- Time zone: UTC+1 (CET)

Ouled Rabah is a town and commune in Jijel Province, Algeria. According to the 1998 census it has a population of 10,142.
