= Bouraoui Belhadef =

- Commune and town

- Location within Algeria
- Country: Algeria
- Province: Jijel Province

Population (1998)
  - Total: 10,965
- Time zone: UTC+1 (CET)

Bouraoui Belhadef is a town and commune in Jijel Province, Algeria. According to the 2002 census it had a population of 10,965. It is named after Bouraoui Ali ben cherif, a local hero of the liberation war against the French 1954–1962.

Bouraoui Belhadef is a commune made by regrouping two douars (tribes): Beniftah (Ouled Messaouda, Essra, Essebt, Ghedir Elkebch, Sidi Ounis, Ouled Khellas and Ouled Amraan), and L'emsid (Beniaicha: Samaa, Errmila, Elakbia, and Boussbaa).
