= Chekfa =

Coordinates: 36°46′N 5°58′E

Chekfa الشقفة
- Commune and town
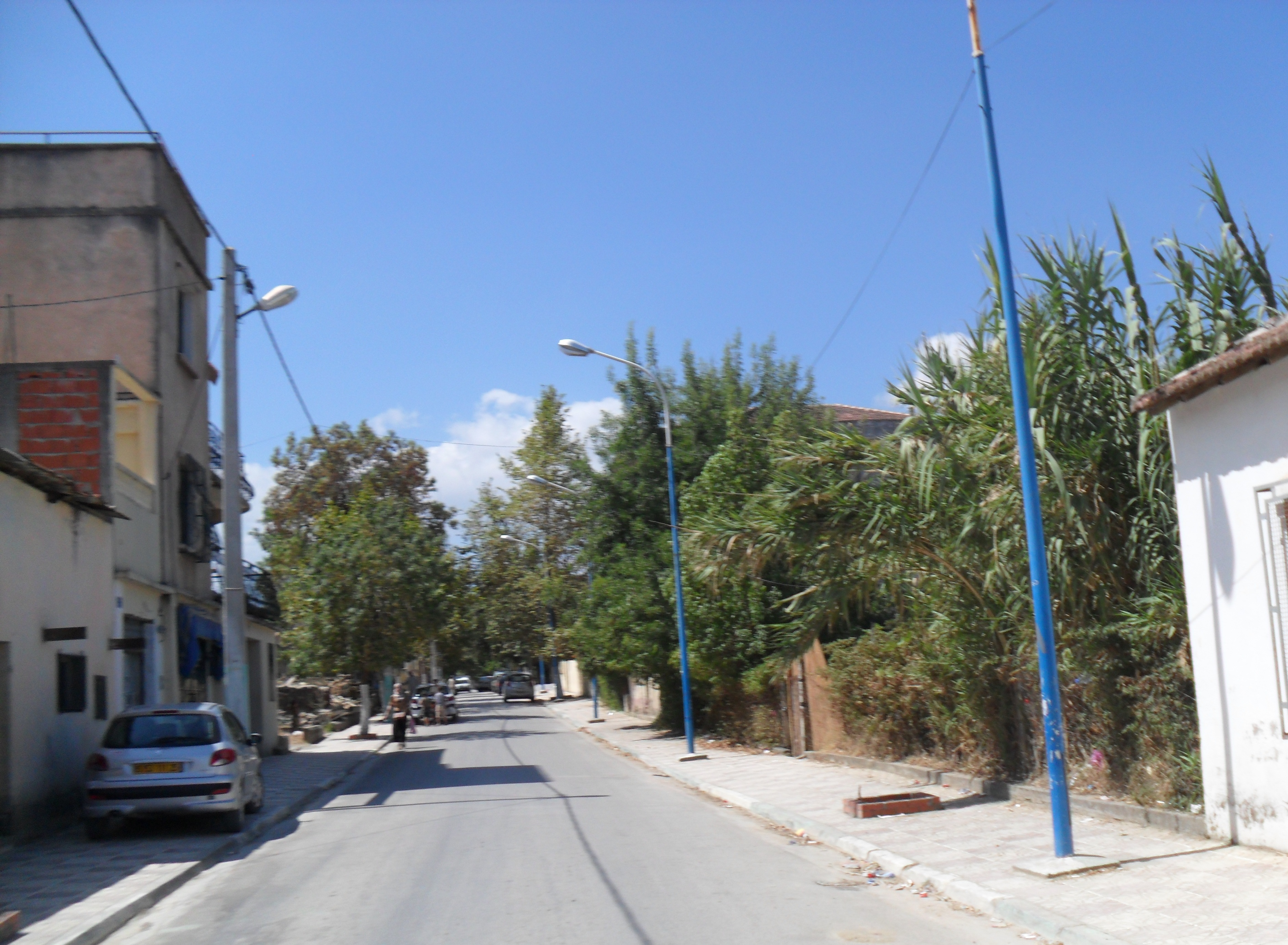

- Country: Algeria
- Province: Jijel Province

Population (2008)
  - Total: 56,447
- Time zone: UTC+1 (CET)

Chekfa is a town and commune in Jijel Province, Algeria. According to the 1998 census it has a population of 25,187.
