= Sidi Abdelaziz =

- Commune and town
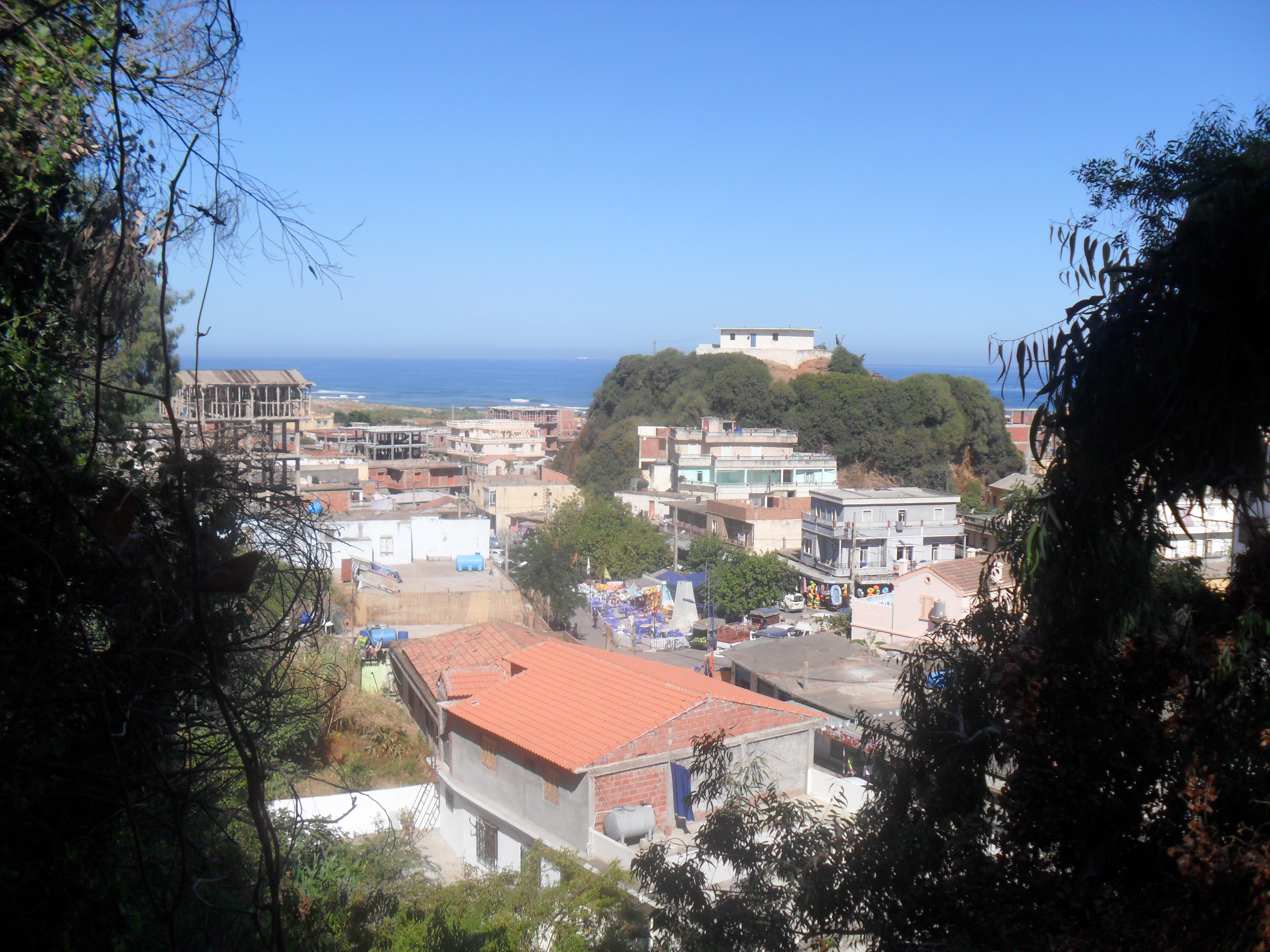

- Location within Algeria
- Coordinates: 36.85°N 6.05°E
- Country: Algeria
- Province: Jijel Province
- District: Chekfa

Area
  - Total: 19.49 sq mi (50.47 km^{2})

Population (2008)
  - Total: 10,153
- Time zone: UTC+1 (CET)

Sidi Abdelaziz is a town and commune in Jijel Province, Algeria. According to the 1998 census it has a population of 9,091.
