= Kheïri Oued Adjoul =

- Commune and town
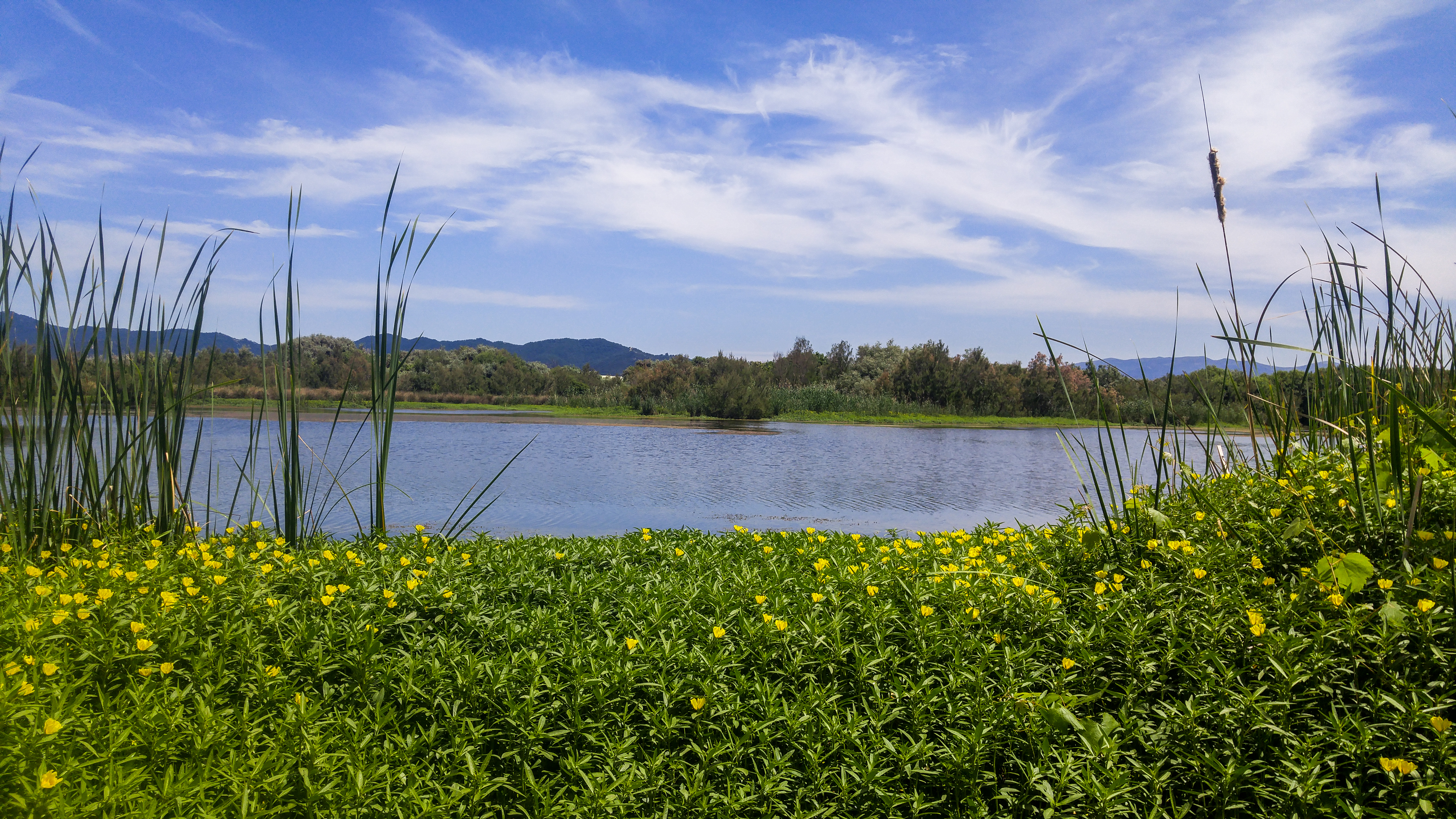

- Location within Algeria
- Country: Algeria
- Province: Jijel Province

Population (1998)
  - Total: 4,612
- Time zone: UTC+1 (CET)

Kheïri Oued Adjoul is a town and commune in Jijel Province, Algeria. According to the 1998 census, it has a population of 4,612.
