= El Ancer =

Coordinates: 36°48′N 6°10′E

- Commune and town
- Country: Algeria
- Province: Jijel Province

Population (1998)
  - Total: 20,070
  - Density: 5,200/sq mi (2,008/km^{2})
- Time zone: UTC+1 (CET)

El Ancer is a town and commune in Jijel Province, Algeria. According to the 1998 census it has a population of 18,738.

== Notable people ==
- Fethnour Lacheheb (born 1963), Algerian handballer who participated in the 1988 Olympics
