= Mediterranean conifer and mixed forests =

North Africa ecoregion

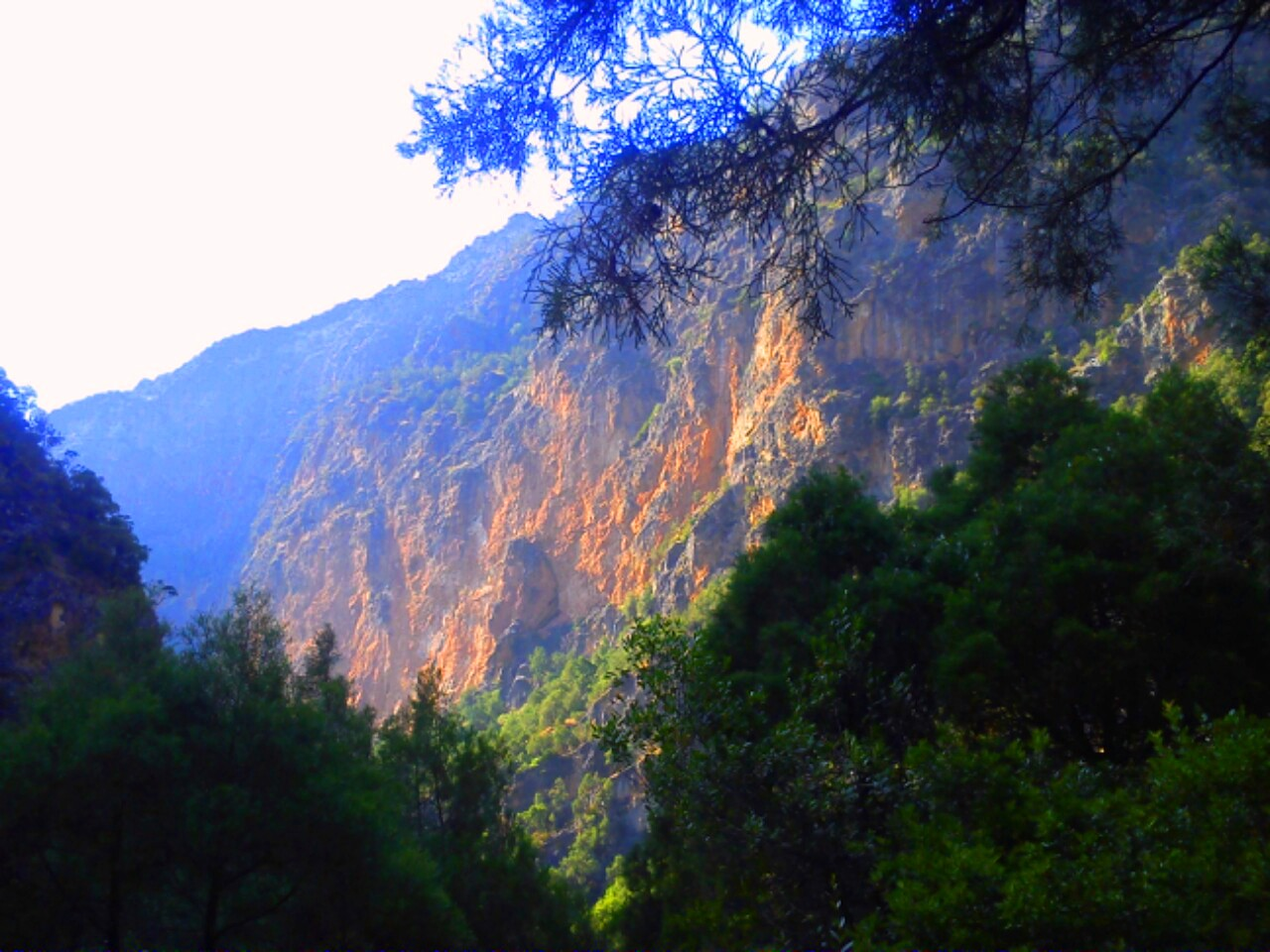
- Rif Mountains, Morocco

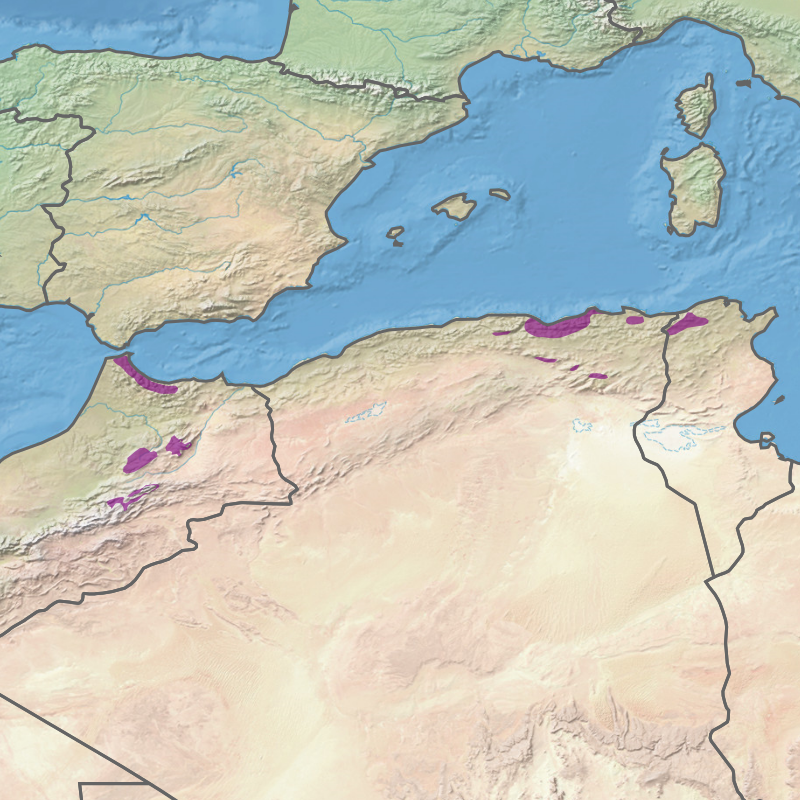
- Ecoregion territory (in purple)

Ecology
- Realm: Palearctic
- Biome: Temperate coniferous forests
- Borders: Mediterranean High Atlas juniper steppe; Mediterranean woodlands and forests

Geography
- Area: 22,984 km^{2} (8,874 mi^{2})
- Countries: Algeria; Morocco; Tunisia

Conservation
- Conservation status: critical/endangered
- Global 200: European-Mediterranean montane mixed forest
- Protected: 4,651 km^{2} (20%)

Mediterranean conifer and mixed forests is an ecoregion, in the temperate coniferous forest biome, which occupies the high mountain ranges of North Africa. The term is also a botanically recognized plant association in the African and Mediterranean literature.

== Geography ==
The Mediterranean conifer and mixed forests ecoregion consists of a series of enclaves in the coastal Rif Mountains and interior Middle Atlas and High Atlas of Morocco, the eastern Tell Atlas and eastern Saharan Atlas of Algeria, and the Kroumerie and Mogod ranges of Tunisia.

The Mediterranean woodlands and forests ecoregion surrounds the Mediterranean conifer and mixed forests at lower elevations.

In the High Atlas, the Mediterranean conifer and mixed forests yield to the Mediterranean High Atlas juniper steppe at the highest elevations.

== Flora ==
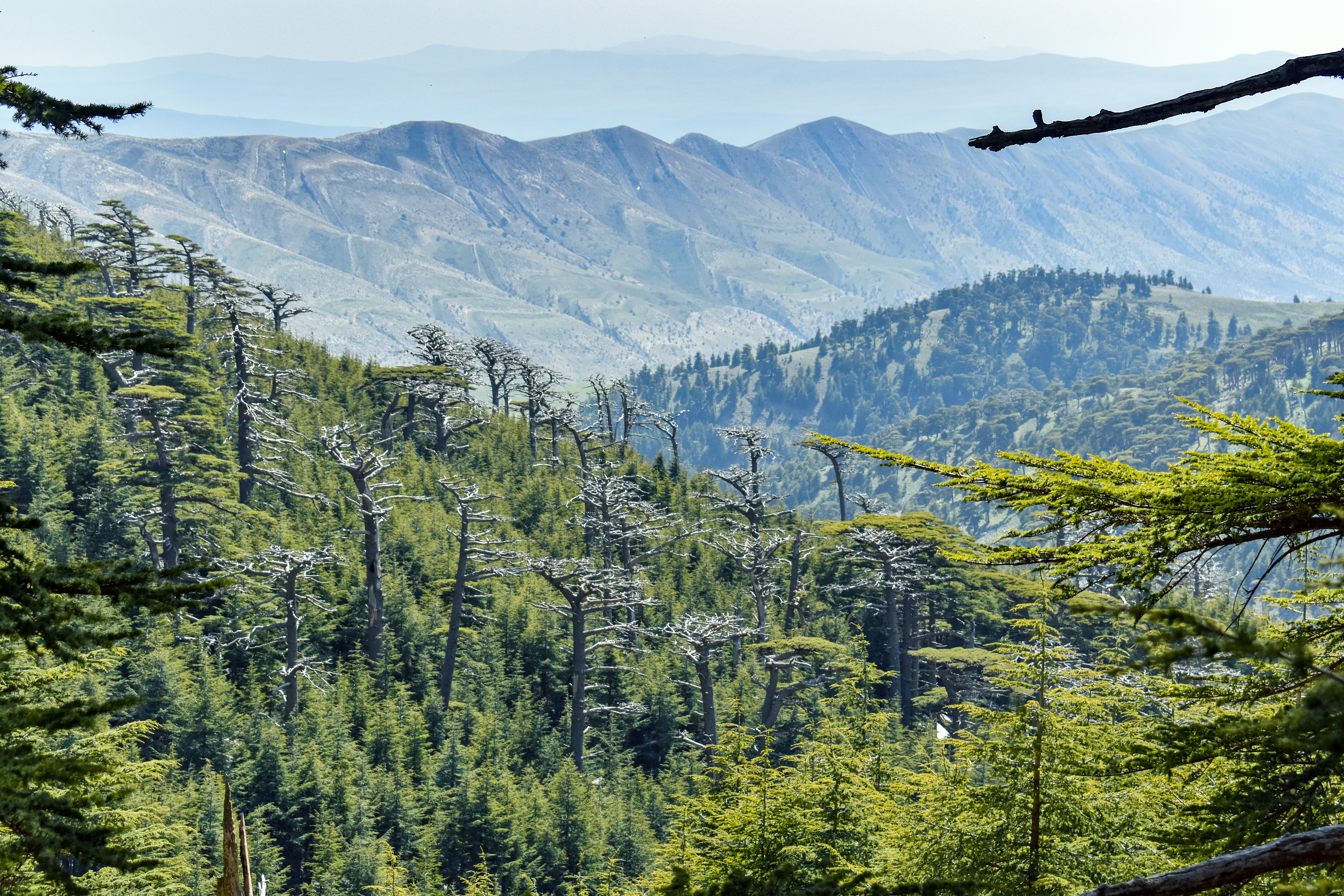
Atlas Cedar Forest on Mount Chelia

- Atlas cedar forests occur in the Rif Mountains, the Middle Atlas and the Tellien Atlas at elevations from 1200 to 2500m. The predominant canopy tree in the forests is Atlas cedar (Cedrus atlantica). Other trees that grow in this area are conifers endemic Algerian fir (Abies numidica), Spanish fir (Abies pinsapo), black pine (Pinus nigra), maritime pine (Pinus pinaster), junipers Juniperus oxycedrus, Juniperus phoenicea, Juniperus thurifera which can form small areas of forest and woodland, European yew (Taxus baccata) and broadleaf trees portuguese oak (Quercus faginea), Algerian oak (Quercus canariensis), the endemic Quercus afares, Acer opalus, Acer monspessulanum, Acer campestre, Aria edulis, Aria torminalis, Aspen (Populus tremula), Betula pendula and white willow (Salix alba).
- Broadleaf forests are dominant on lower elevations and on humid slopes in the Rif, Tellien Atlas, and Kroumerie-Mogod mountain ranges. The mixed oak forests are dominated by Algerian oak (Quercus canariensis), portuguese oak (Quercus faginea), Pyrenean oak (Quercus pyrenaica), Quercus lusitanica and the endemic Quercus afares. Cork oak (Quercus suber) dominated forests occur in warm and humid areas. Holm oak (Quercus rotundifolia) and kermes oak forests occur on a variety of soils and climates. The understory is dominated by a rich mix of evergreen small trees and large shrubs, including bay laurel (Laurus nobilis), strawberry tree (Arbutus unedo), tree heath (Erica arborea), green heath (Erica scoparia), holly (Ilex aquifolium), Phillyrea angustifolia, Phillyrea latifolia, Chamaerops humilis, laurustinus (Viburnum tinus), hairy broom (Cytisus villosus), and common myrtle (Myrtus communis). Maritime pine (Pinus pinaster) often grows in these forests.
- Berber thuya forests and woodlands occur in the low elevations of the Rif and Tellien Atlas mountains near the coast on limestone soils. They are characterized by Berber thuya (Tetraclinis articulata).
- Wild olive and carob woodlands and maquis: open woodlands and shrublands of wild olive (Olea europaea europaea and Olea europaea maroccana), and carob (Ceratonia siliqua) cover lowland areas with deep, drier soils.
- Xeric pine forests and woodlands are found mainly in the drier interior with low precipitation and at low elevations, near the transition to the Mediterranean woodlands and forests. The predominant trees of these forests are Aleppo pine (Pinus halepensis) and Maritime pine (Pinus pinaster) mixed with holm oak (Quercus rotundifolia) and xeric junipers Juniperus thurifera, Juniperus phoenicea and Juniperus oxycedrus. The forests and woodlands have an understory of shrubs, including Cistus, Genista, and rosemary, which also form pockets of shrubland.

== Fauna ==
Endangered mammals in the ecoregion include the Barbary macaque (Macaca sylvanus) at locations such as the Djebel Babor Mountains, Atlas deer (Cervus elaphus barbarus), and African leopard (Panthera pardus pardus). Other mammals include the red fox (Vulpes vulpes), European otter (Lutra lutra), Cuvier's gazelle (Gazella cuvieri), and Barbary sheep (Ammotragus lervia). The Barbary lion (Panthera leo leo) and Atlas bear (Ursus arctos crowtheri) formerly lived here.

== Conservation and threats ==
Deforestation due to overuse by the local population is a major threat as are the effects of climate change.
