= Petite Kabylie =

Natural region in Algeria

Coordinates: 36.00°N 5.00°E

Petite Kabylie Tamurt n Iqbayliyen
- Natural region
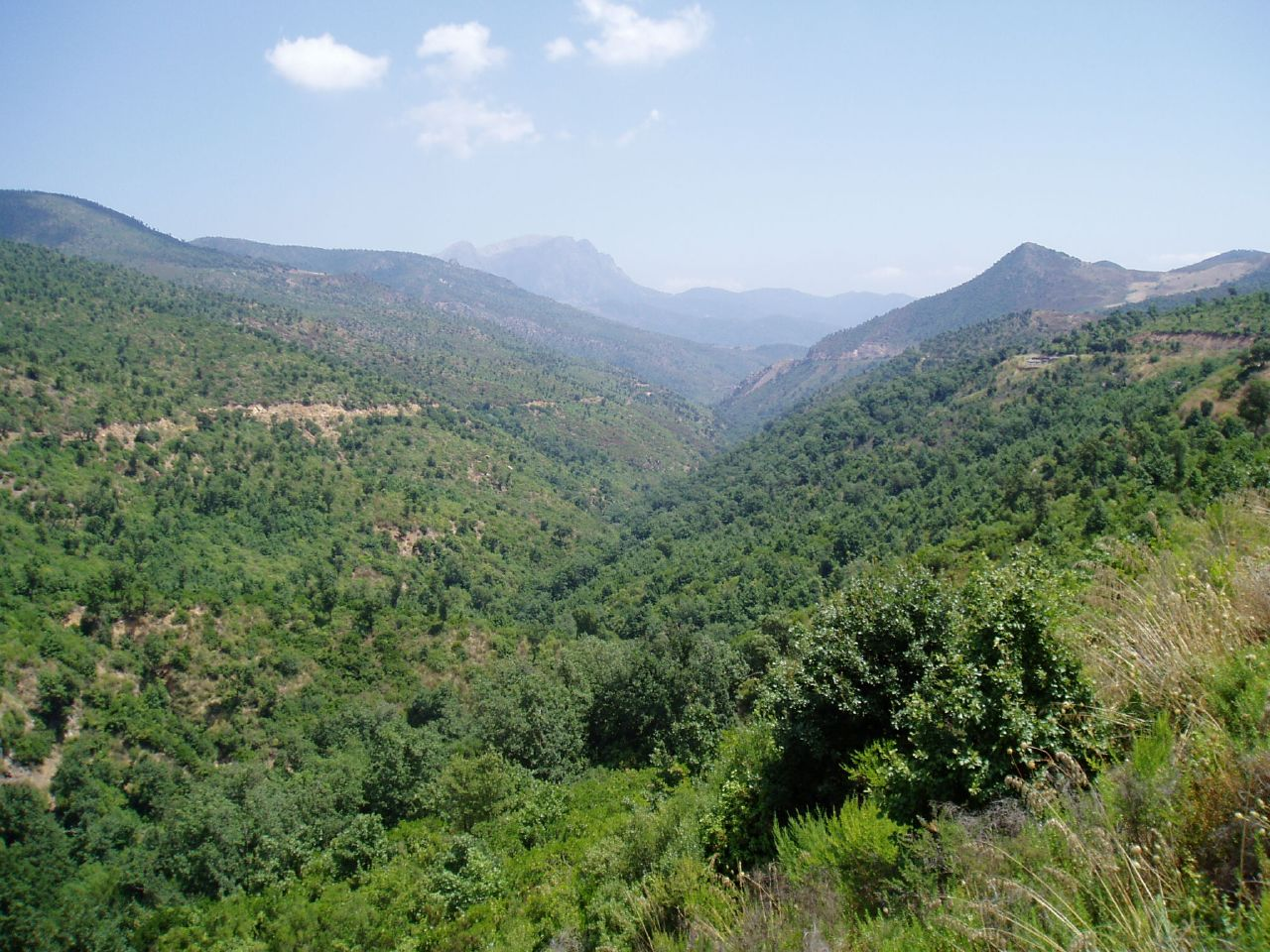
- Landscape of Petite Kabylie in Béjaïa Province

- Topographic map of Kabylie with the Petite Kabylie located by the Babor Range.
- Country: Algeria

Petite Kabylie or Petite Kabylia (Berber: Tamurt n Iqbayliyen, Arabic: al-Qabā'il as-Sughrā, القبائل الصغرى, Maghrebi Arabic: Qbayel es-Sghira) is a natural region in the mountainous area of northern Algeria. The Petite Kabylie is part of the greater Kabylie region.

== Geography ==
The Petite Kabylie is located in the mountainous area of the Bibans and the Babor Range, subranges of the Tell Atlas range bordering the Mediterranean. The Petite Kabylie is separated from the Grande Kabylie by the Soummam Valley.

The Petite Kabylie spreads over several administrative divisions of Algeria: Béjaïa Province, part of Setif Province (Ath Yaala, Ath Ourtilan, Draa Kebila, Bouandas, Babor), part of Bordj Bou Arréridj Province (Ath Laalam, El Main, El Mehir, Ath Djafar, Ath Khelifa, Ath Sidi Brahim, Mensourah, Rabiâa, Tizi El Khemis, Tizi Ikachouchan, Tassamert,) and the part of Bouira Province bordering the provinces of Béjaïa and Bordj Bou Arreridj.

An ampler definition could include the Arabophone regions that by tradition are culturally Berber of Jijel Province, and only the western parts of Mila Province and the western parts of Skikda Province up to Collo and Tamalous.

== Ecology ==
Some of Petite Kabylie is forested with Mediterranean conifer and mixed forests. This locale offers one of the few remaining disjunctive habitats for the endangered Barbary macaque, Macaca sylvanus, a primate species which prehistorically held a much wider range.

== See also ==
- Tell Atlas
- El-Marsa Forest
- Tajmâat
