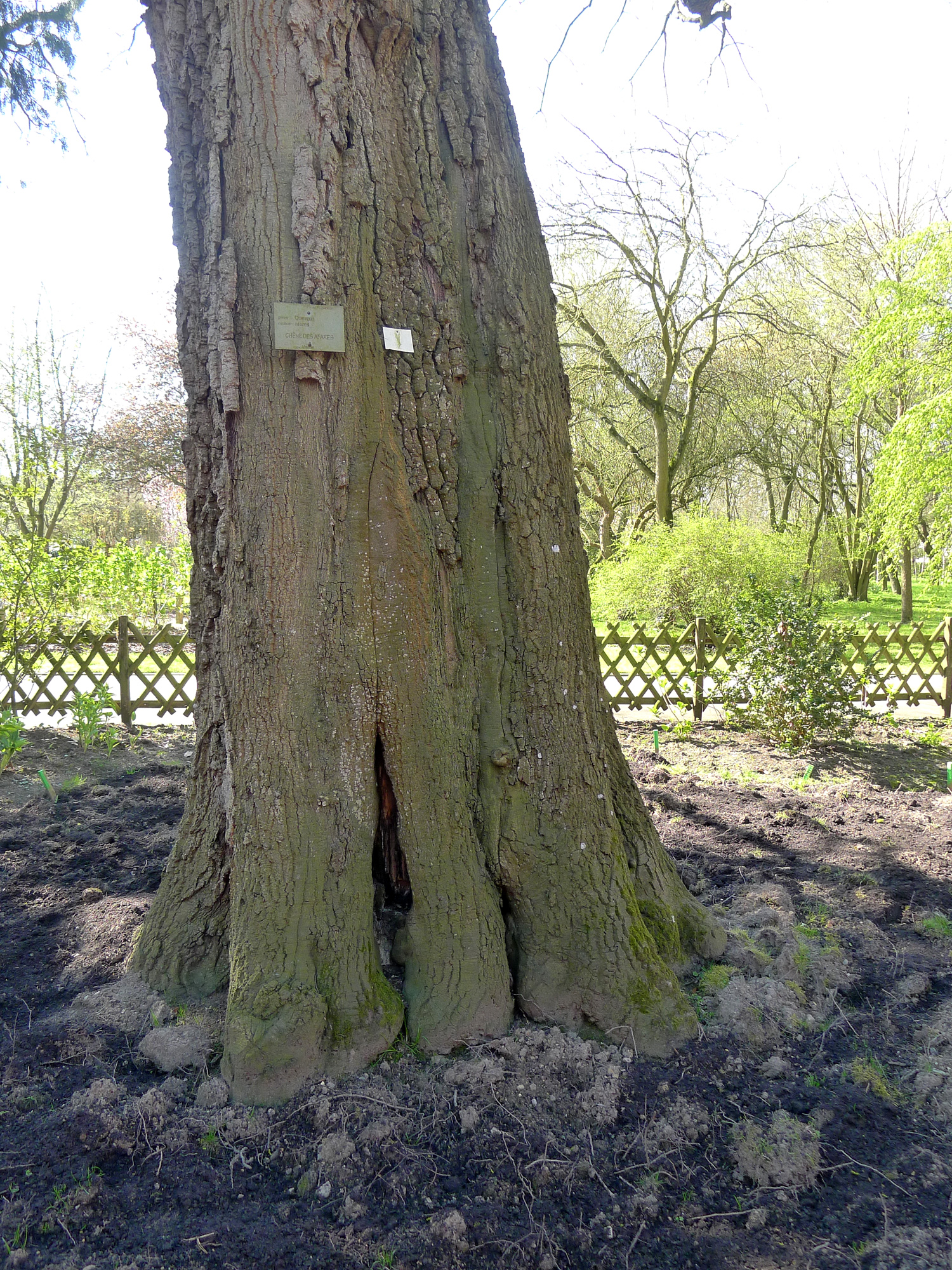
- African oak trunk

Conservation status
- Vulnerable (IUCN 3.1)

Scientific classification
- Kingdom: Plantae
- Clade: Tracheophytes
- Clade: Angiosperms
- Clade: Eudicots
- Clade: Rosids
- Order: Fagales
- Family: Fagaceae
- Genus: Quercus
- Subgenus: Quercus subg. Cerris
- Section: Quercus sect. Cerris
- Species: Q. afares

Binomial name
- Quercus afares Pomel

= Quercus afares =

Species of oak tree

Quercus afares, the African oak, is a species of oak native to Algeria and Tunisia. It has a very limited distribution in the coastal mountains of the eastern Tell Atlas in Algeria, and the Mogod-Kroumerie region of northwestern Tunisia. Quercus afares is deciduous, with a corky bark (thinner than that of the cork oak, Q. suber), and can reach 25–30 metres in height. It grows in dense stands, associated with cork oak at elevations as low as 200 metres, and with the semi-deciduous Algerian oak (Q. canariensis) from 700 to 1600 metres elevation. Q. afares can also be found in monospecific stands, especially above 1200 metres on soils damaged by fire. It is endemic to the eastern coastal portion of the Mediterranean conifer and mixed forests ecoregion.

== Taxonomy ==
Quercus afares was for a long time considered to be closely allied to the chestnut-leaved oak (Q. castaneifolia) of the Caucasus and northern Iran (Hyrcania) due to their morphological resemblance, even after it had been described as distinct by Auguste Pomel, in 1875. Thus, some authors treated it as a subspecies (Q. castaneifolia subsp. afares), a variety (Q. castaneifolia var. algeriensis), or as a synonym outright (Quercus castaneifolia). Then, a 2006 genetic analysis using both nuclear (allozymes) and chloroplastic markers found that Q. afares originated as a hybrid of the two sympatric oak species cork oak (Quercus suber) and Algerian oak (Quercus canariensis), in which case it would be a stabilised hybrid between members of two genetically distant sections of the genus, Q. suber being from section Cerris and Q. canariensis from section Quercus. This seemed plausible given the species' intermediate characteristics: like Q. suber, it has a biennial reproductive cycle, corky bark, and similar fruit, and also does not occur on limestone soils. Unlike Q. suber, which is limited to coastal areas with mild winters, Q. afares shares the cold-tolerance of Q. canariensis which shares some of its mountain habitats. In contrast, a 2017 study by Denk et al. found no evidence of a hybrid origin, instead retrieving Q. afares as a primary species of Section Cerris, closely allied with Q. castaneifolia and Q. cerris in subsect. Cerris. In a 2023 follow-up study, Denk et al. reinforced this affiliation with sect. Cerris, but found Q. afares to instead belong in subsect. Libani of sect. Cerris, alongside Q. libani from western Asia and Q. trojana from Anatolia, the southern Balkans and southern Italy.
