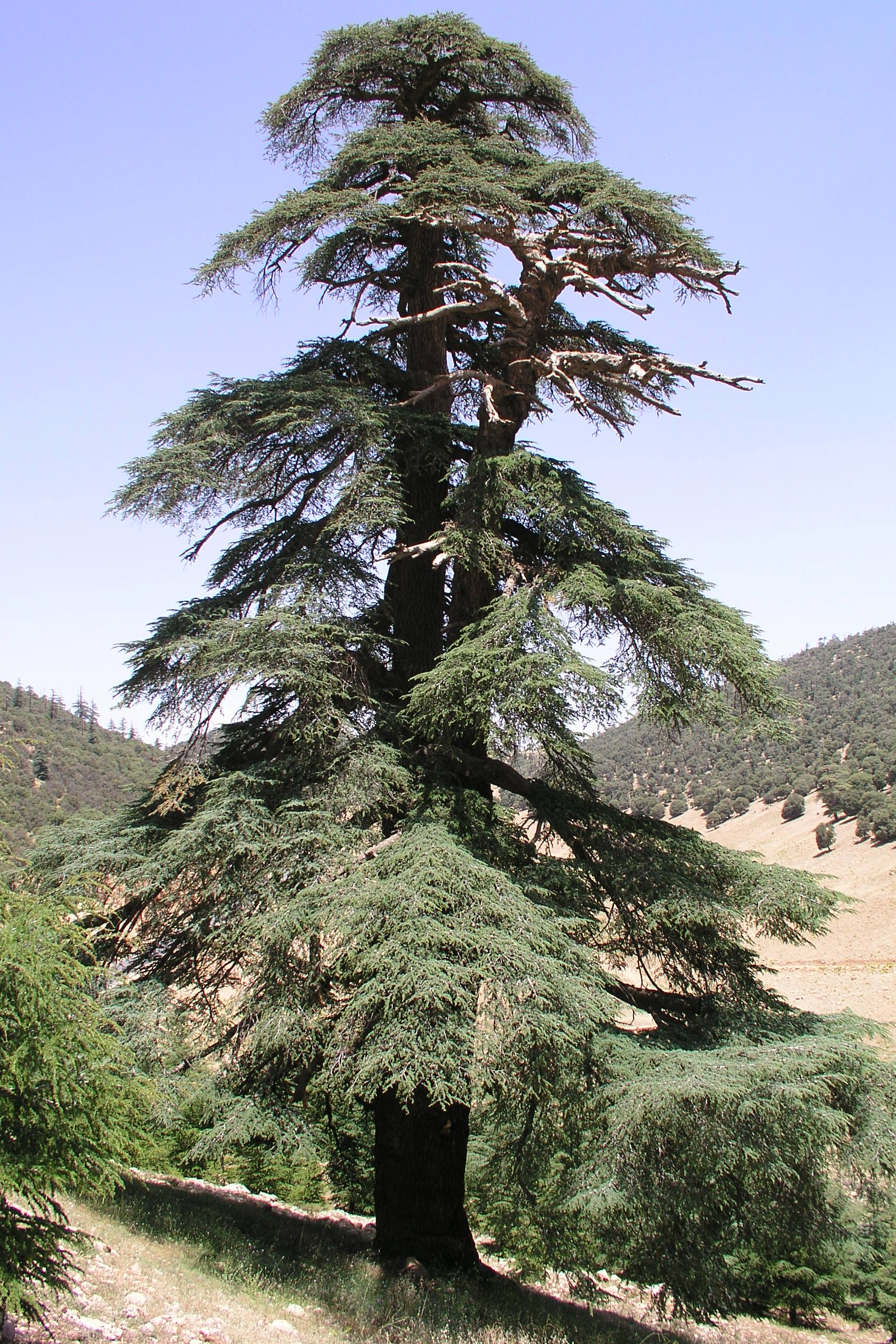
- Atlas cedar (Azrou, Morocco)

Conservation status
- Endangered (IUCN 3.1)

Scientific classification
- Kingdom: Plantae
- Clade: Tracheophytes
- Clade: Gymnosperms
- Division: Pinophyta
- Class: Pinopsida
- Order: Pinales
- Family: Pinaceae
- Genus: Cedrus
- Species: C. atlantica

Binomial name
- Cedrus atlantica (Endl.) Manetti ex Carrière
- Continuous range ✖ Isolated population

Synonyms
- C. libani subsp. atlantica (Endl.) Batt. & Trab.

= Cedrus atlantica =

Atlas cedar

Species of conifer

Cedrus atlantica, the Atlas cedar, is a species of coniferous tree in the pine family Pinaceae, native to the Rif and Atlas Mountains of Morocco (Middle Atlas, High Atlas), and to the Tell Atlas in Algeria. A majority of the modern sources treat it as a distinct species Cedrus atlantica, but some sources consider it a subspecies of Lebanon cedar (C. libani subsp. atlantica).

== Description ==
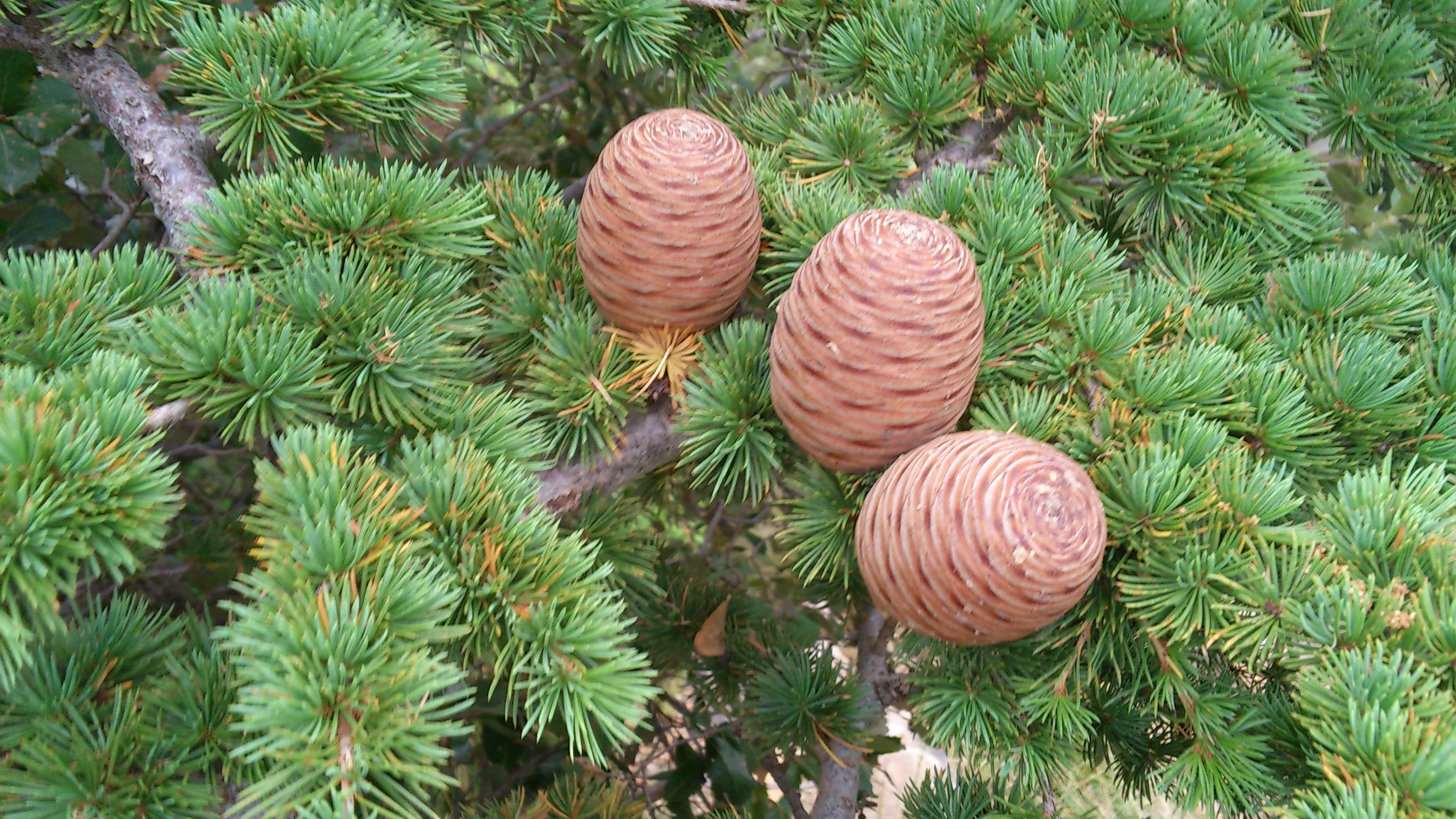
Cedrus atlantica foliage and mature female cone

Male cones about to shed pollen

When fully grown, the Atlas cedar is a large coniferous tree, reaching 30 to 35 m (98 to 115 ft), rarely 40 m (130 ft), in height. The trunk reaches a diameter of 1.5 to 2 m (4.9 to 6.6 ft).

The Atlas cedar is very similar in all characters to the other varieties of the Lebanon cedar; differences are hard to discern. For instance, the mean cone size tends to be somewhat smaller (although recorded to 12 cm, only rarely over 9 cm long, compared to up to 10 cm in C. libani var. brevifolia, and 12 cm in C. libani var. libani), though with considerable overlap (all can be as short as 6 cm). Similarly, the Cedrus atlantica leaf length (10–25 mm) is comparable to that of C. libani var. stenocoma, on average longer than C. libani var. brevifolia and shorter than C. libani var. libani, but again with considerable overlap.

== Ecology ==
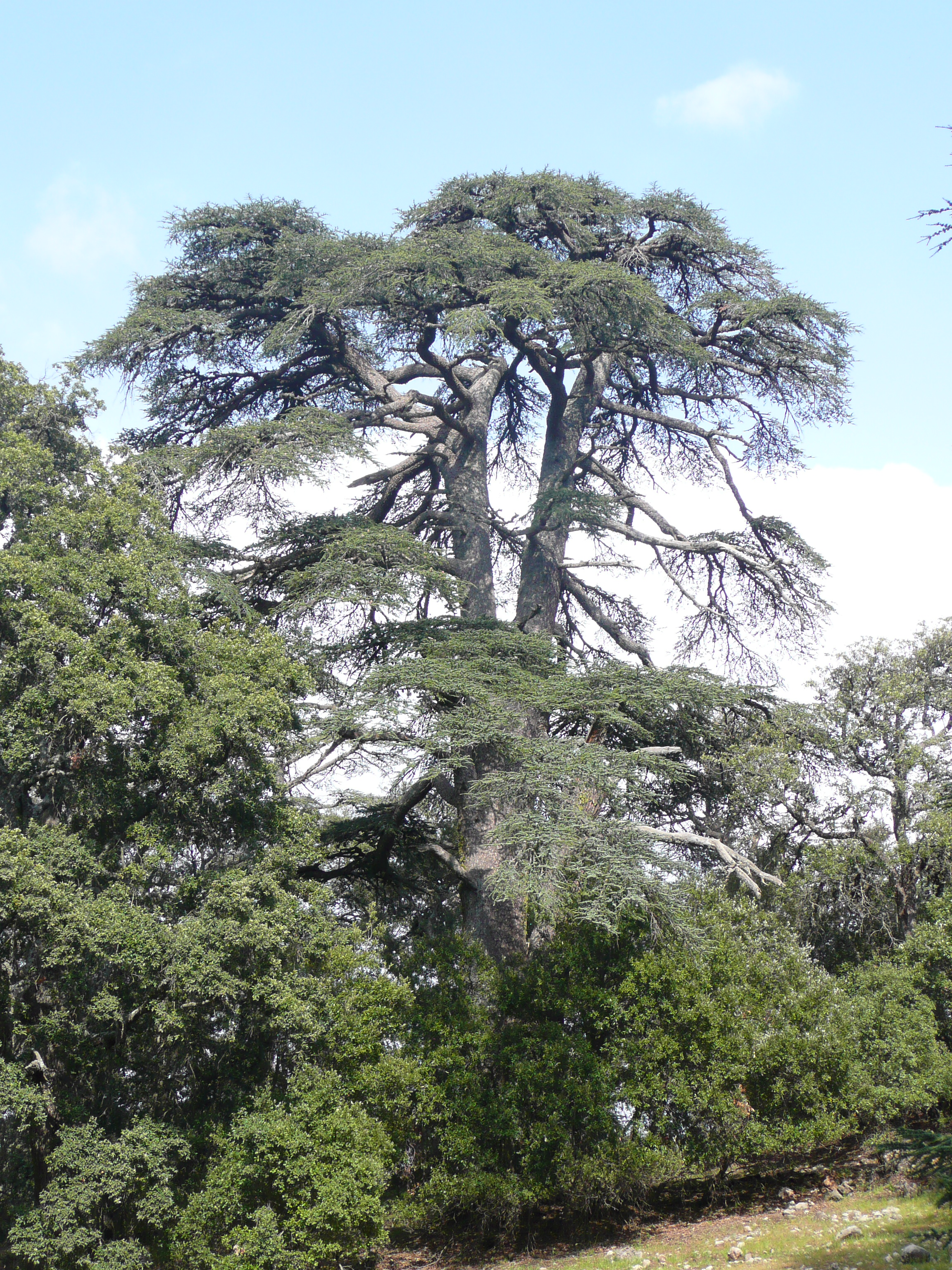
An old Cedrus atlantica tree in the Atlas Mountains, Morocco

Atlas cedars form forests on mountainsides at 1,170 to 2,200 m (3,840 to 7,220 ft), often in pure forests, or mixed with Algerian fir - Abies numidica, Juniperus oxycedrus, holm oak - Quercus ilex, and Acer opalus. These forests can provide habitat for the endangered Barbary macaque (Macaca sylvanus), a primate that had a prehistorically much wider distribution in northern Morocco and Algeria.

Currently, Morocco has the highest total area of Atlas cedar in the world. It forms large forests in the humid zones of the country, around the Middle Atlas range, the oriental and Northern High Atlas range, and in the Western and Central Rif mountain range. The current total area is around 163,000 hectares, of which around 115,000 hectares (80%) are situated in the Middle Atlas mountains. The species is in danger from human use, wood harvesting and fires. Data that go back to 1927 show higher number of Atlas cedars (more than 150,000 hectares) in the Middle Atlas mountains only. The Rif mountains had one of the largest cedar forests in the past, but forests nowadays are much smaller, 15% of the total cedar forests in Morocco. Recently massive reforestation campaigns have taken place in the region of Ifrane Province.

In Algeria, the Atlas cedar has been in significant decline. According to data from 1966 the species inhabited 23,000 hectares, forming forests around the Djurdjura Mountains in Kabylie and Aures Mountains. However, it is expected that it currently inhabits fewer than 15,000 hectares owing to extensive fires and human use.

== Cultivation and uses ==
=== Landscape ===
C. atlantica is common in cultivation as an ornamental tree in temperate climates. Due to its very close similarity to C. libani, and (with trees grown from cultivated origin seed) the existence of frequent hybrids between them, identification is often problematic, with many specimens of uncertain identity. In garden settings, often the glaucous forms are planted as ornamental trees, distinguished as the Glauca group, a cultivar group. Also, fastigiate, pendulous, and golden-leaf forms are in cultivation. The Atlas cedar is useful in cultivation because it is more tolerant of dry and hot conditions than most conifers.

Many of the cultivated trees have glaucous (bluish) foliage, more downy shoots, and can have more leaves in each whorl; young trees in cultivation often have more ascending branches than many cultivated C. atlantica specimens.

In the UK the following cultivars have gained the Royal Horticultural Society's Award of Garden Merit (confirmed 2017):

- 'Aurea' (golden Atlas cedar)
- 'Glauca' (Glauca Group)
- 'Glauca Pendula' (Glauca Group)

An Atlas cedar is planted at the White House South Lawn in Washington, DC. President Carter ordered a tree house built within the cedar for his daughter Amy. The wooden structure was designed by the President, and is self-supporting so as not to cause damage to the tree.

=== Forestry ===
Cedar plantations, mainly with C. atlantica, have been established in southern France for timber production.

== Gallery ==
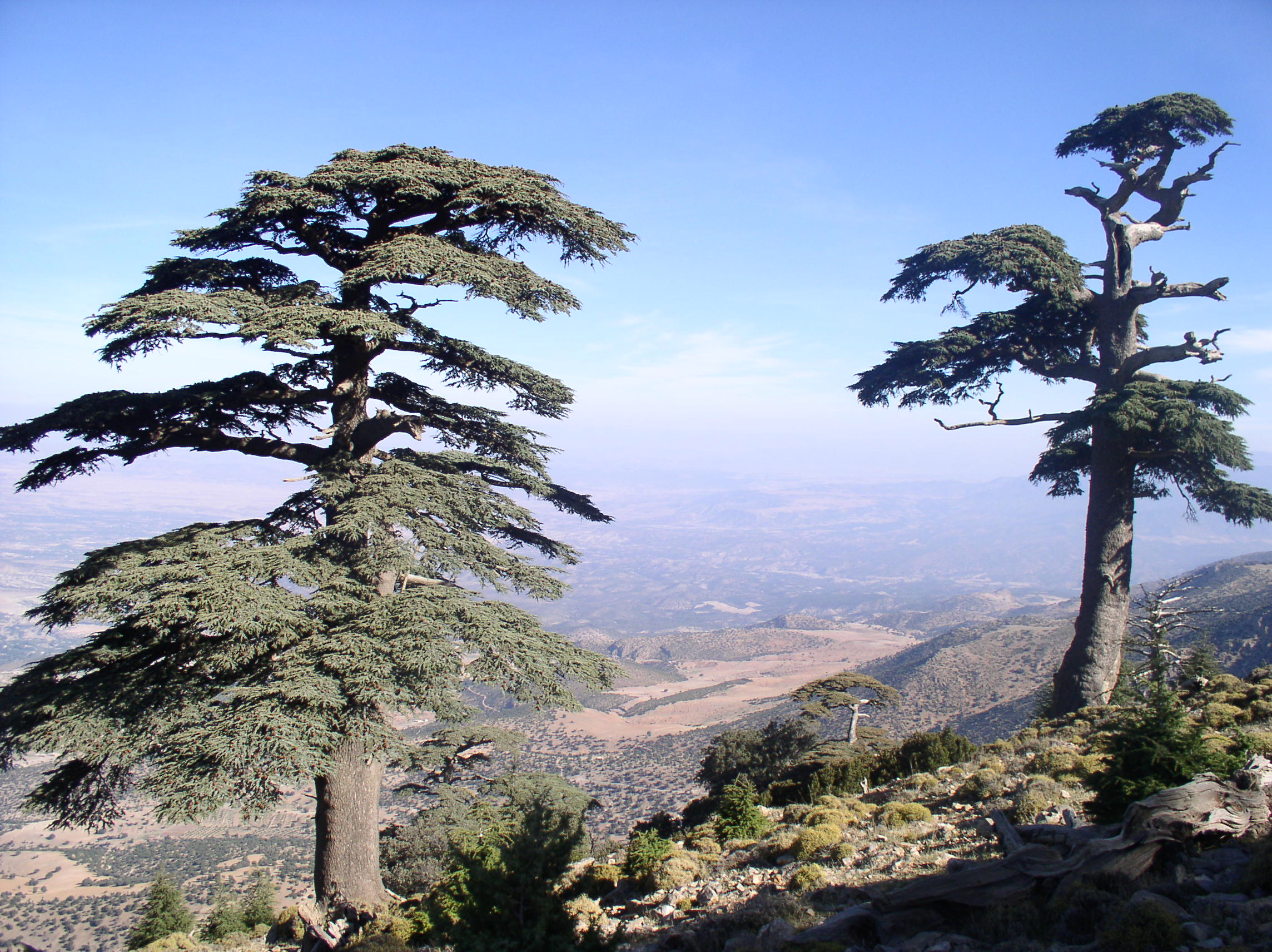
Old trees in Morocco

In Algeria

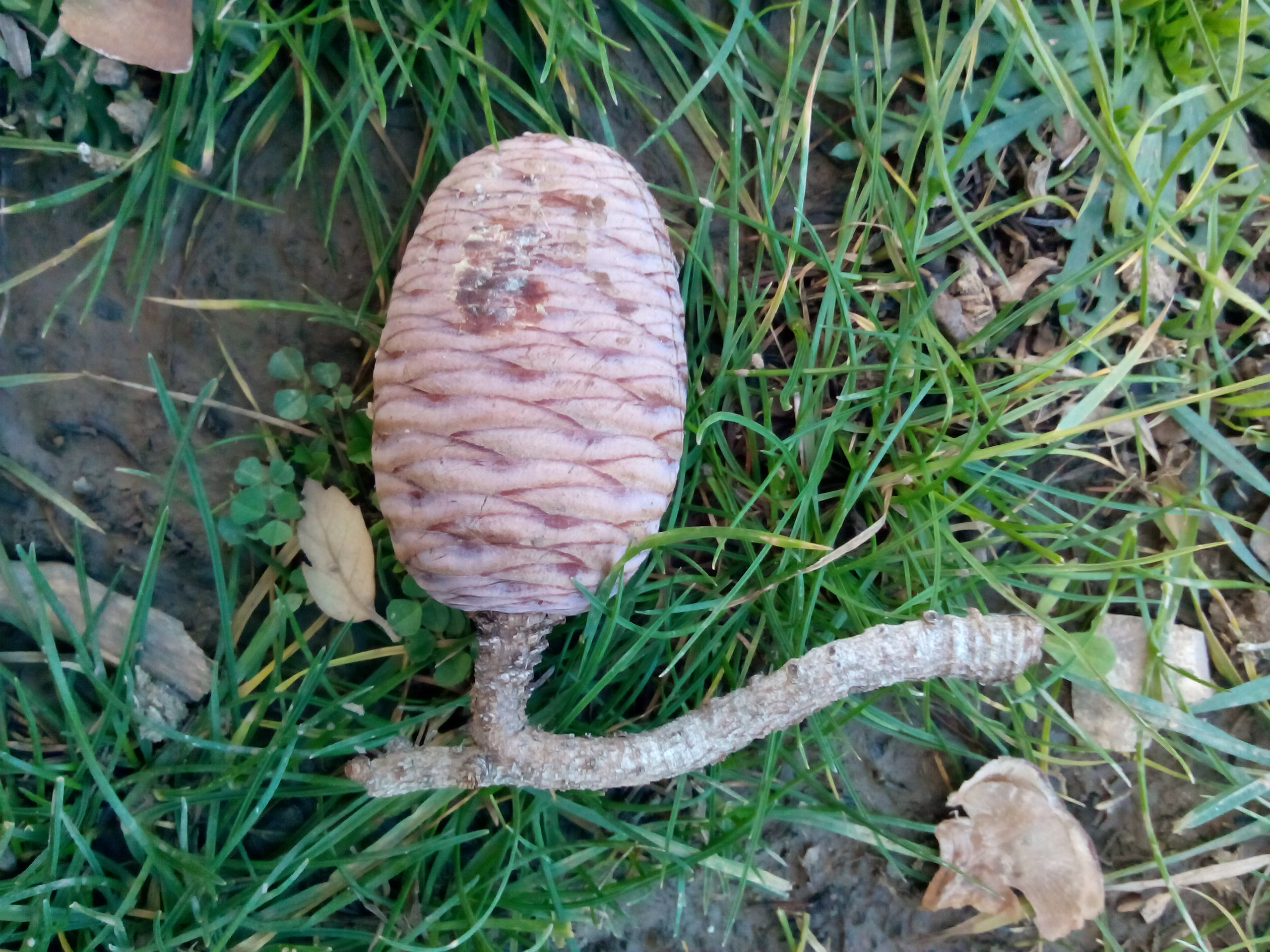
Mature cone, Algeria

Pollen cones

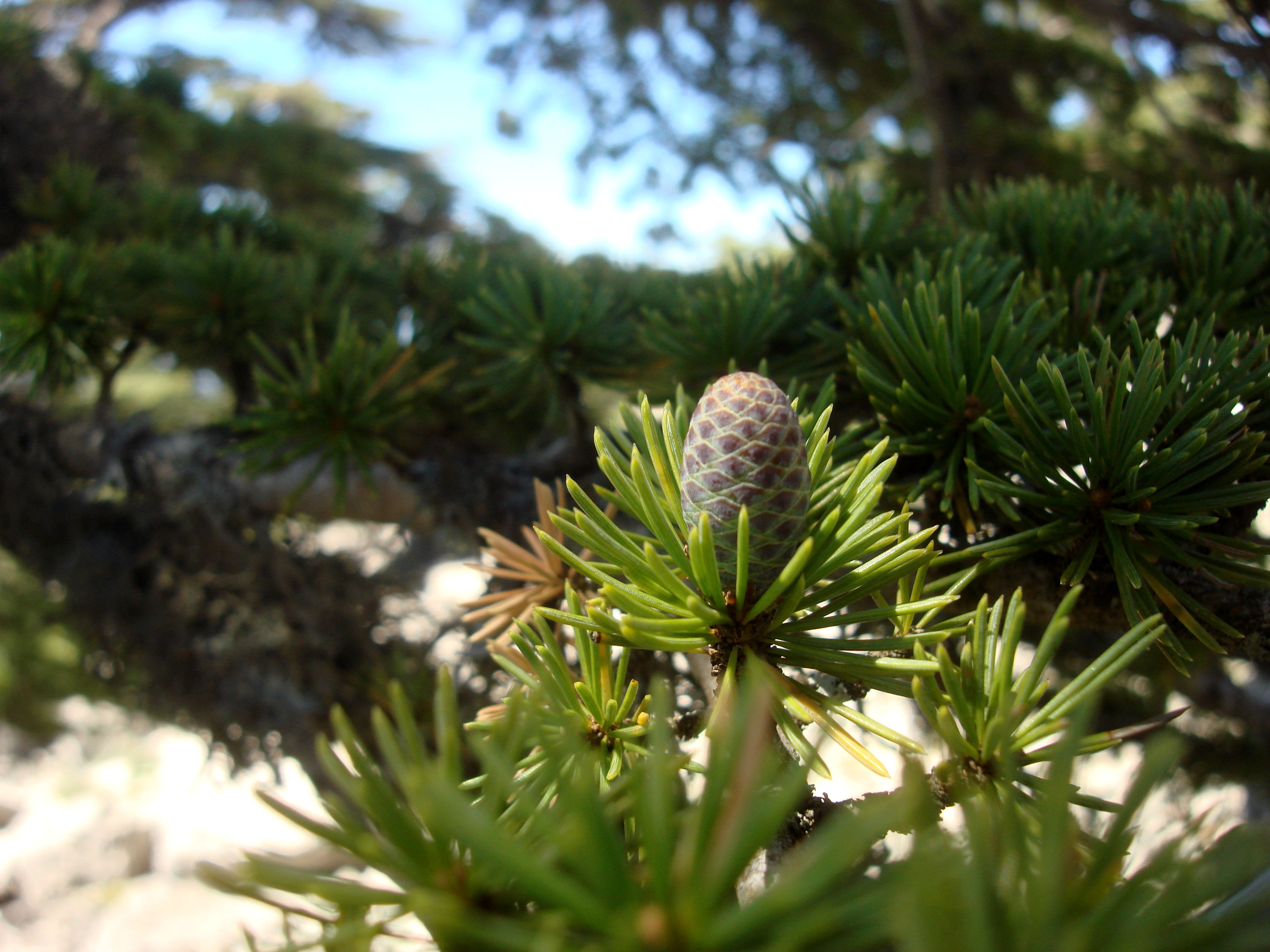
Young seed cone

Branch with pollen cones

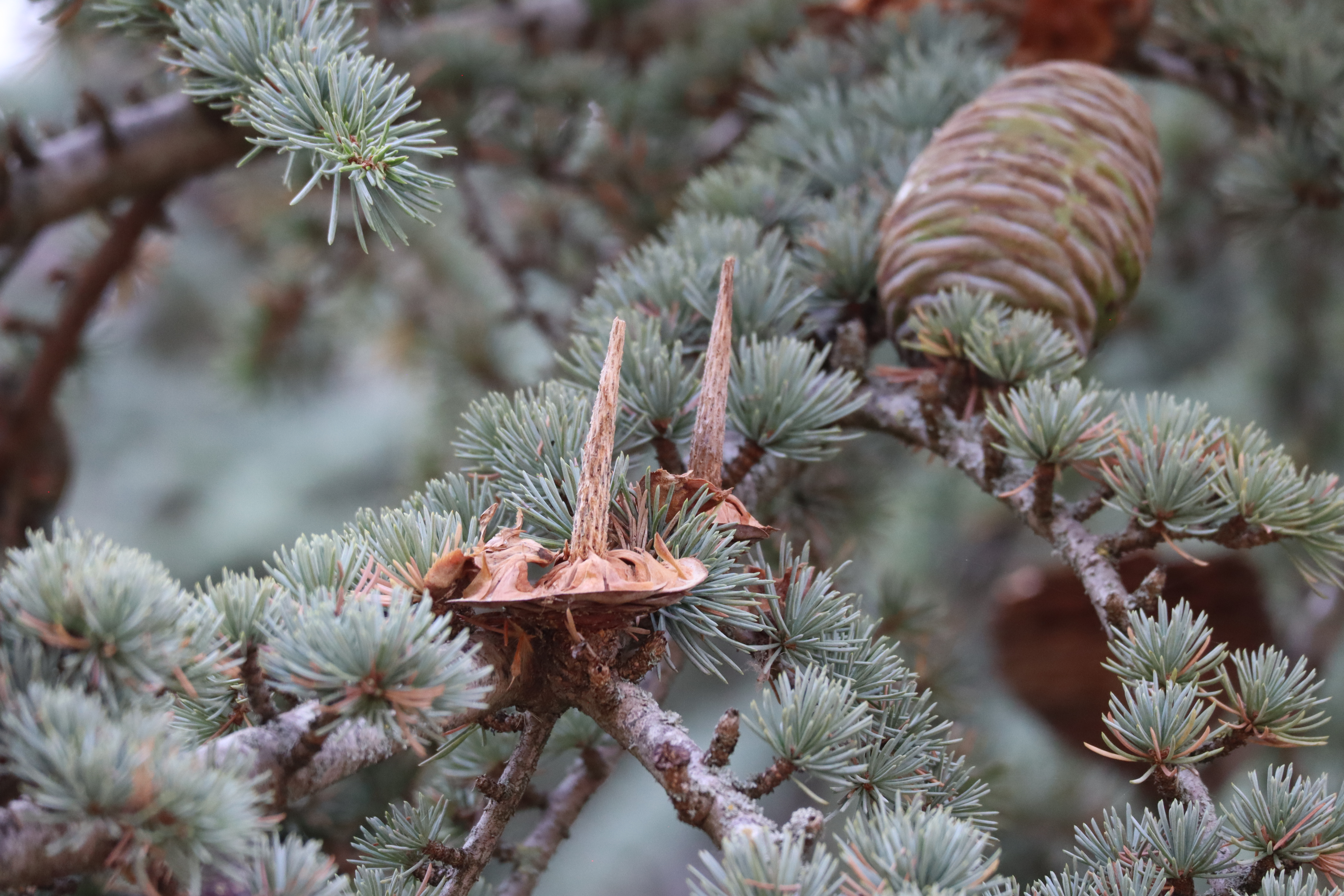

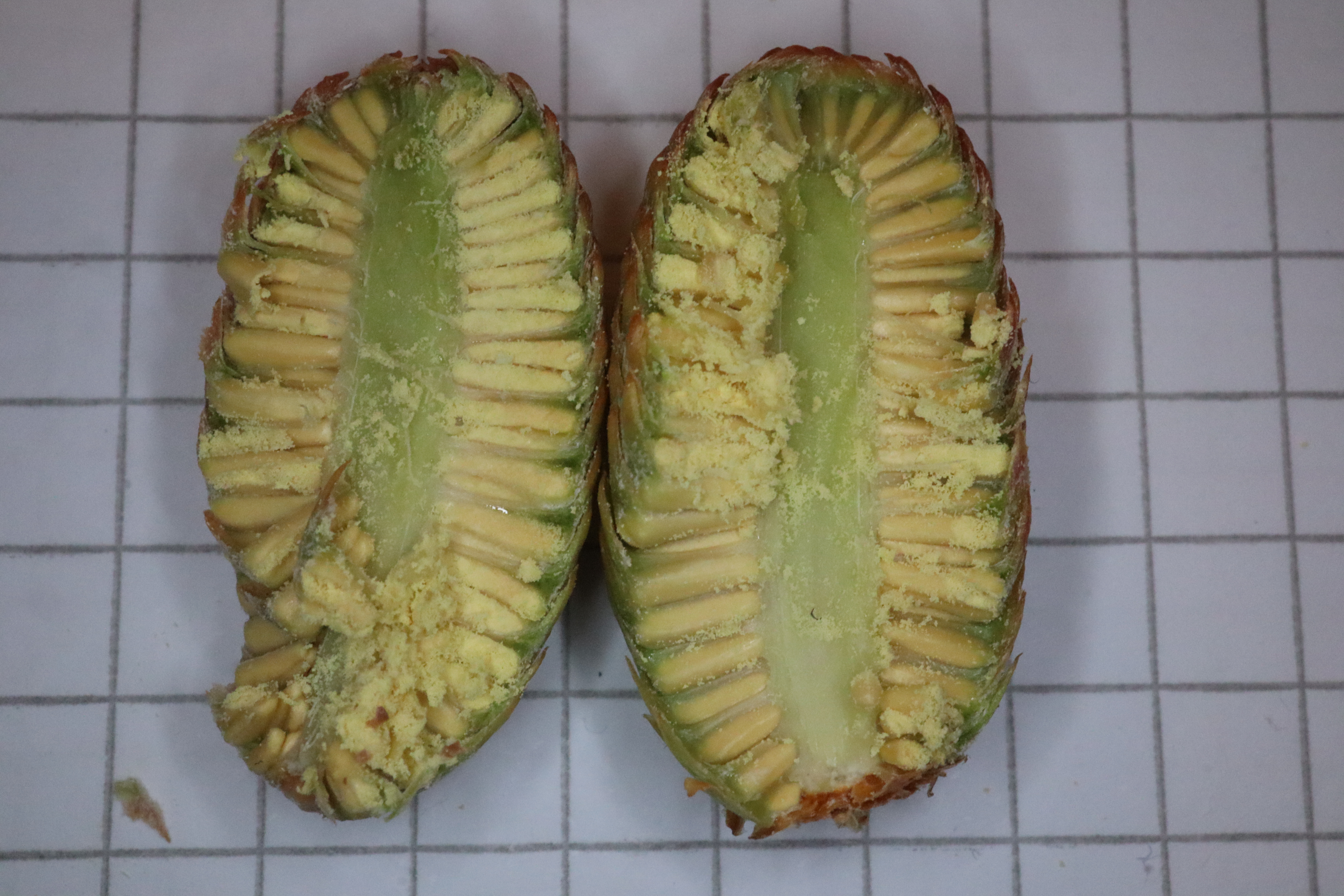

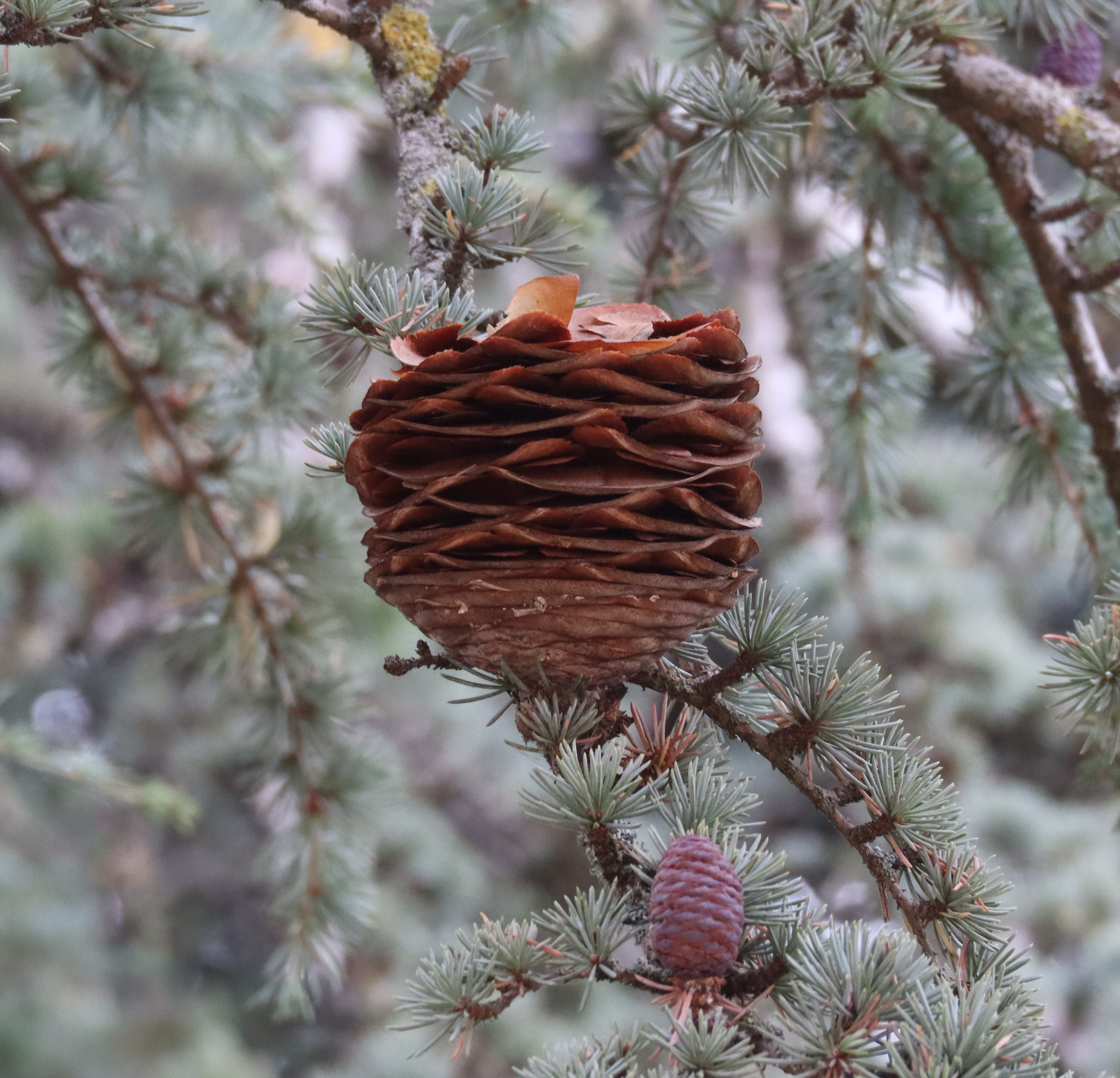

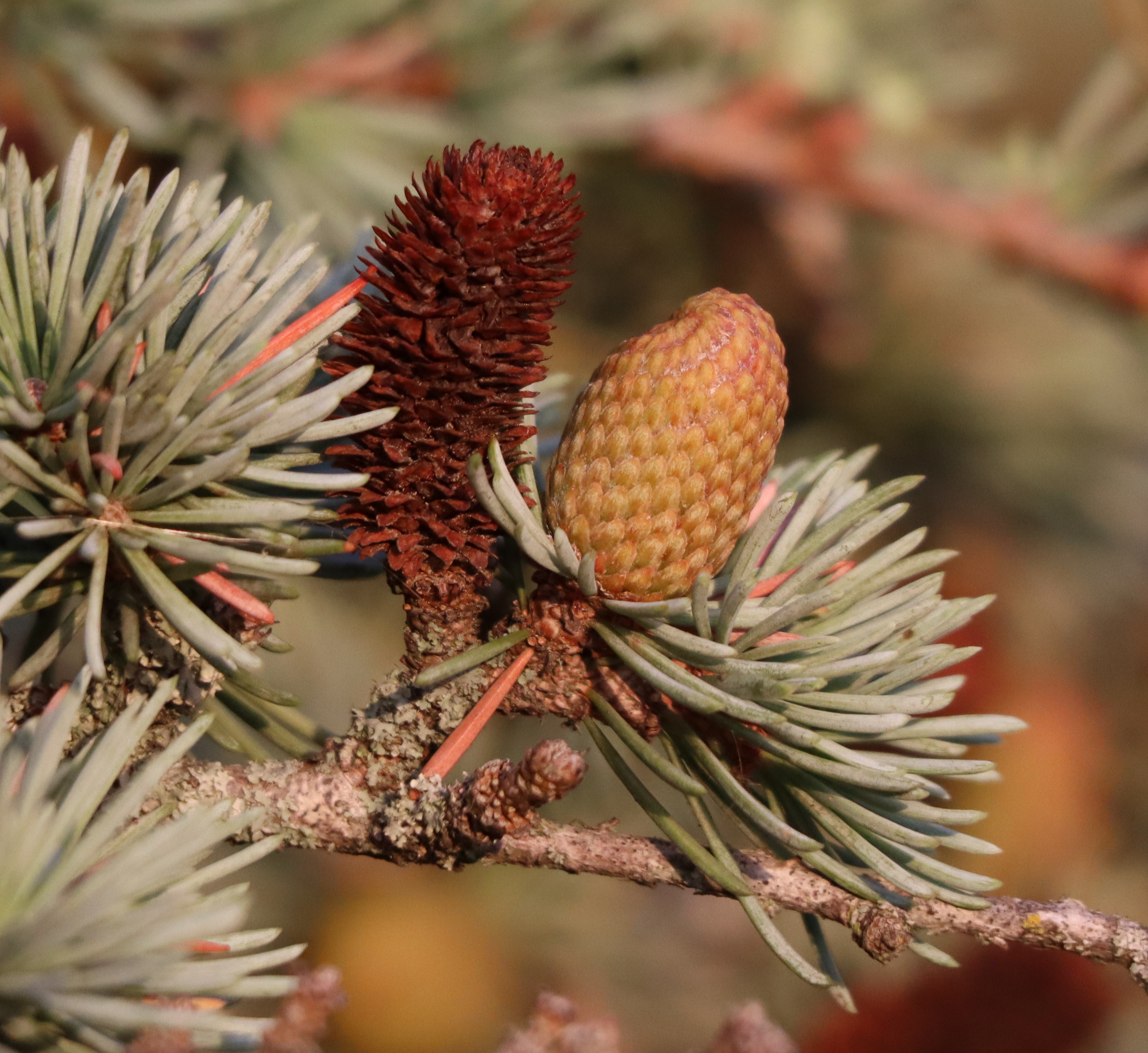
