= Babor Mountains =

Mountain range in Algeria

Babor Range
- ⵉⴷⵓⵔⴰⵔ ⵏ ⵉⴱⴰⴱⵓⵕⴻⵏ / Idurar n Ibabuṛen
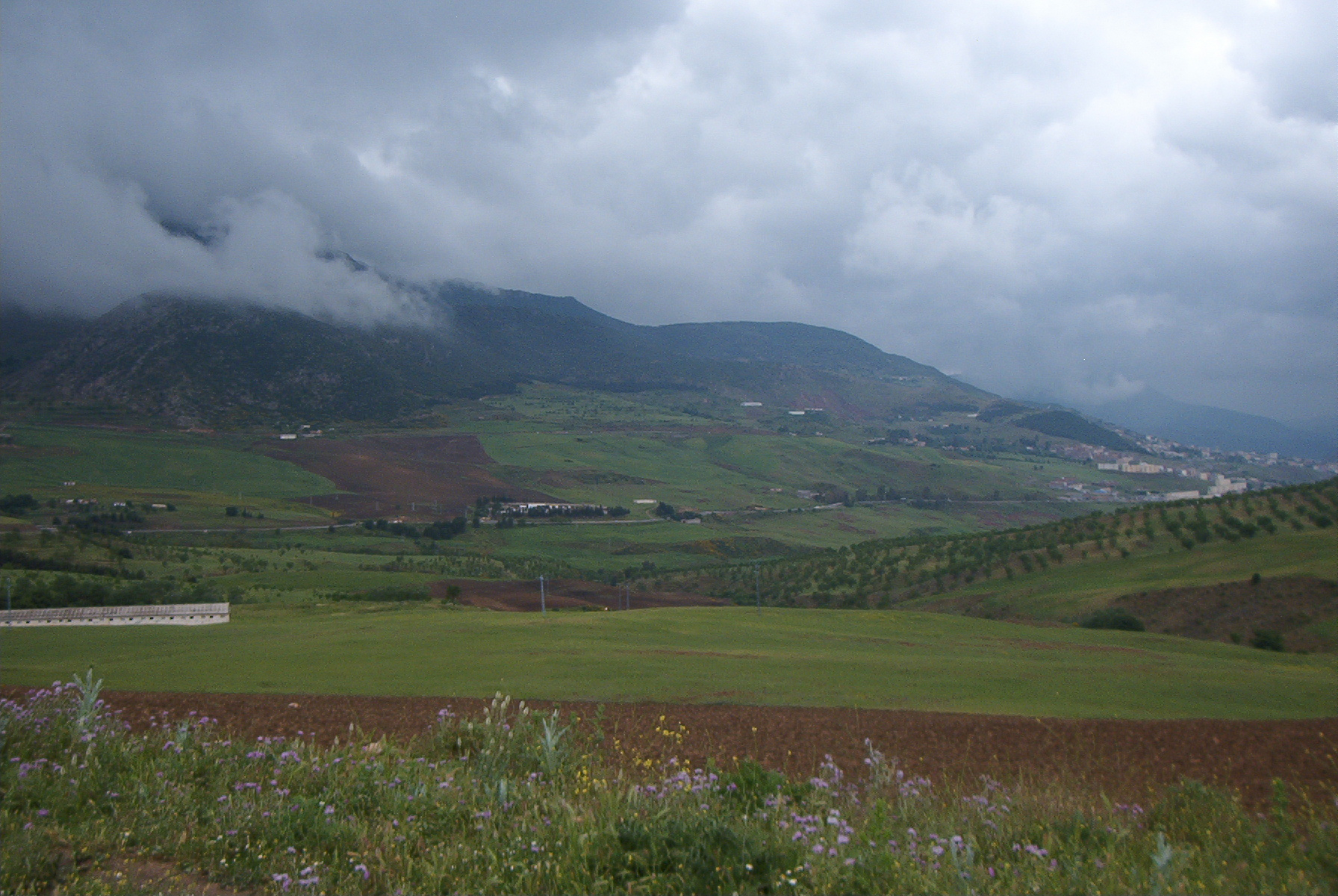
- View of the Babor Range near Bougaa

Highest point
- Peak: Mount Babor
- Elevation: 2,004 m (6,575 ft)
- Coordinates: 36°33′0″N 5°28′0″E

Geography
- Location within Algeria
- Location: Petite Kabylie, Algeria
- Parent range: Tell Atlas

The Babor Range (Arabic: جبل البابور; Kabyle: Idurar n Ibabuṛen) is a mountain range of the Tell Atlas in Algeria. The highest point of the range is 2,004 m high Mount Babor.

The Babor Range, together with the neighboring Bibans, is part of the mountainous natural region of Petite Kabylie.

== Ecology ==
There is a protected area in the range, the Djebel Babor Nature Reserve, known for birdwatching. It is also one of the few remaining habitats for the endangered Barbary macaque, Macaca sylvanus.

== Features ==
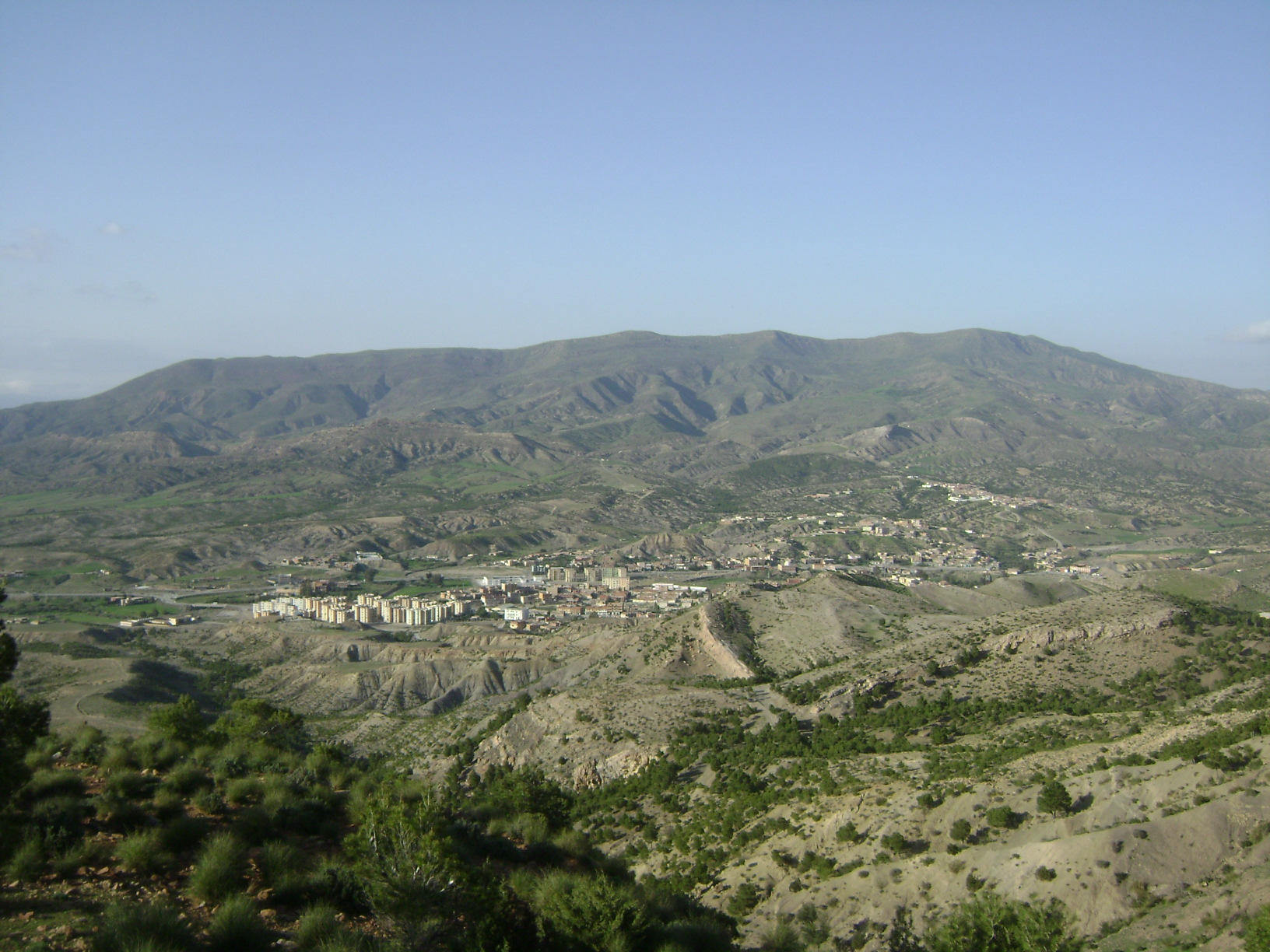
View of Mansoura, Bordj Bou Arreridj Province

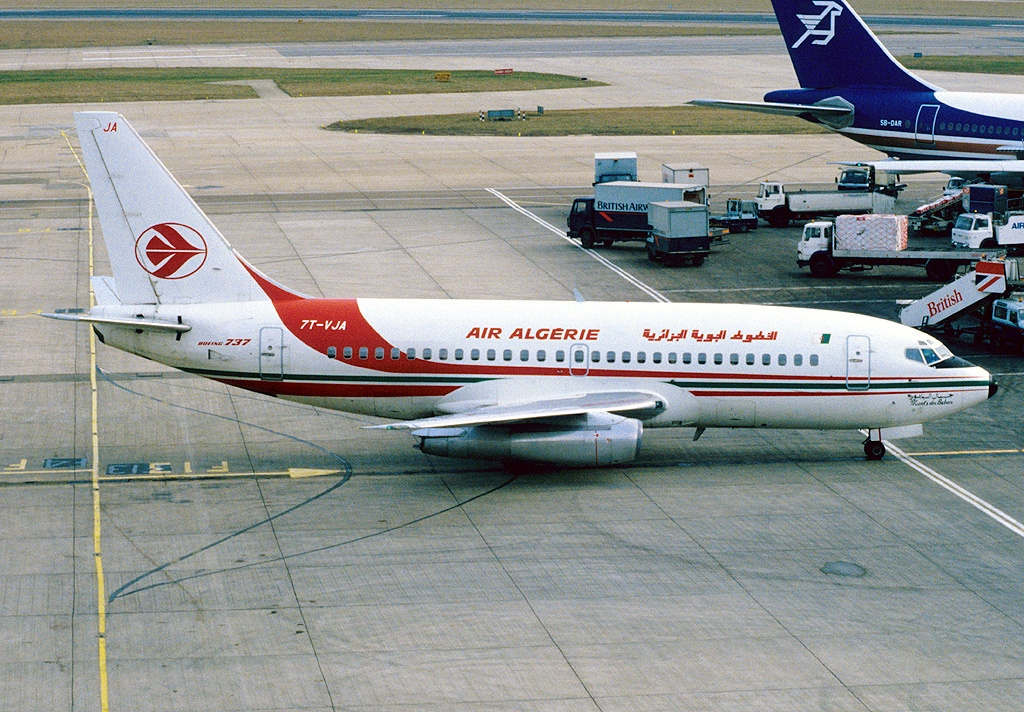
The Air Algerie Boeing 737-2T4/Adv named "Monts des Babors"

== See also ==
- List of mountains in Algeria
- Petite Kabylie
- Tell Atlas
