= Djebel Babor Nature Reserve =

Protected area in Algeria

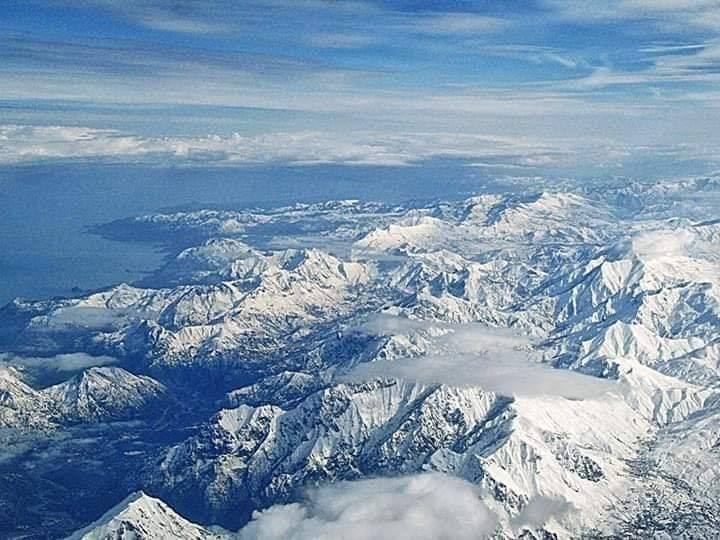
The Babor mountains of the Tell Atlas in Algeria

The Djebel Babor Nature Reserve is a protected area in Algeria. The reserve is within the Babor Mountains, part of the Tell Atlas mountain chain. Much of this area is forested with Mediterranean conifer and mixed forests. This reserve offers one of the few remaining disjunctive habitats for the endangered Barbary macaque, Macaca sylvanus, a primate species which prehistorically held a much wider range. The reserve is also a significant birdwatching area.
