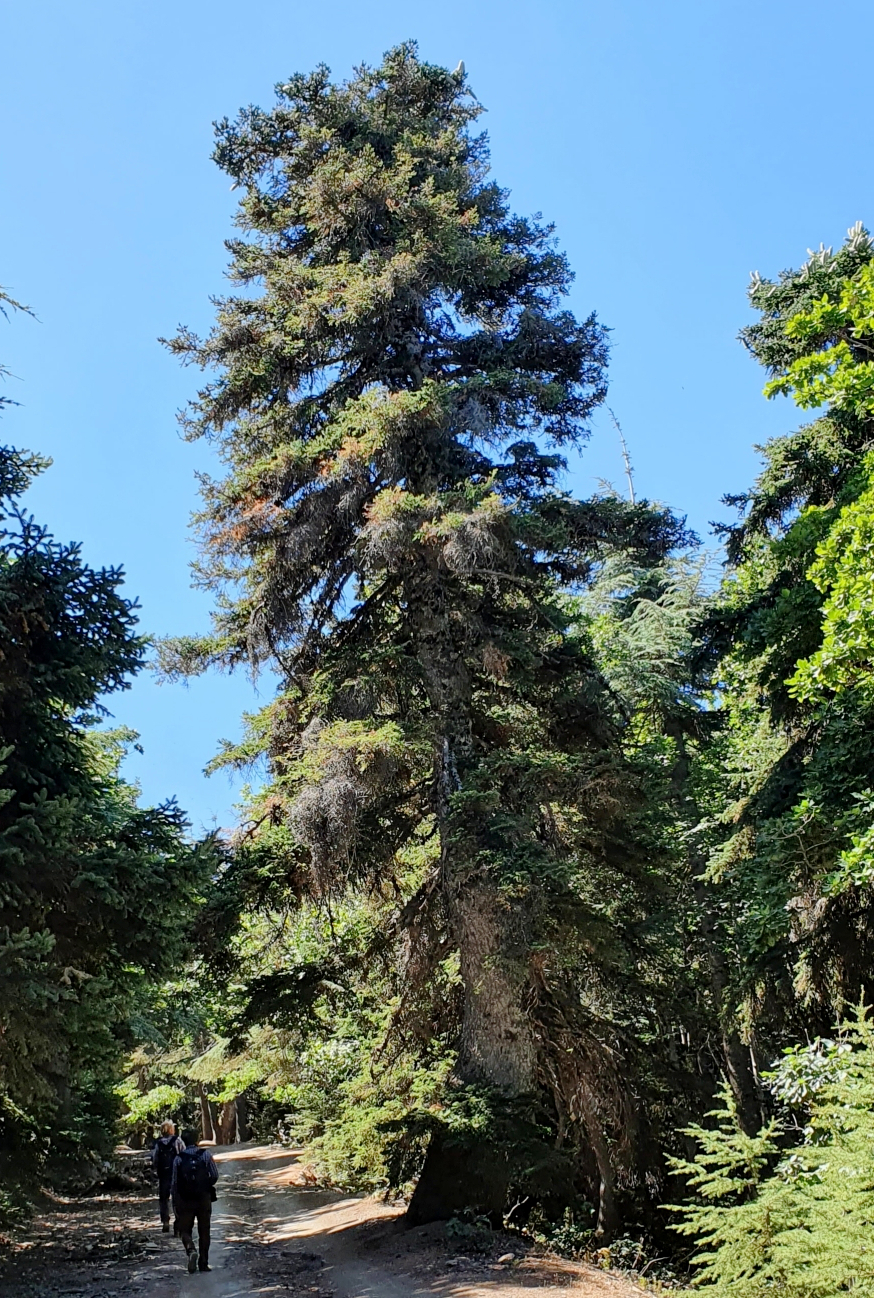
- Abies numidica on Jebel Babor

Conservation status
- Critically Endangered (IUCN 3.1)

Scientific classification
- Kingdom: Plantae
- Clade: Tracheophytes
- Clade: Gymnosperms
- Division: Pinophyta
- Class: Pinopsida
- Order: Pinales
- Family: Pinaceae
- Genus: Abies
- Species: A. numidica

Binomial name
- Abies numidica de Lannoy ex Carrière
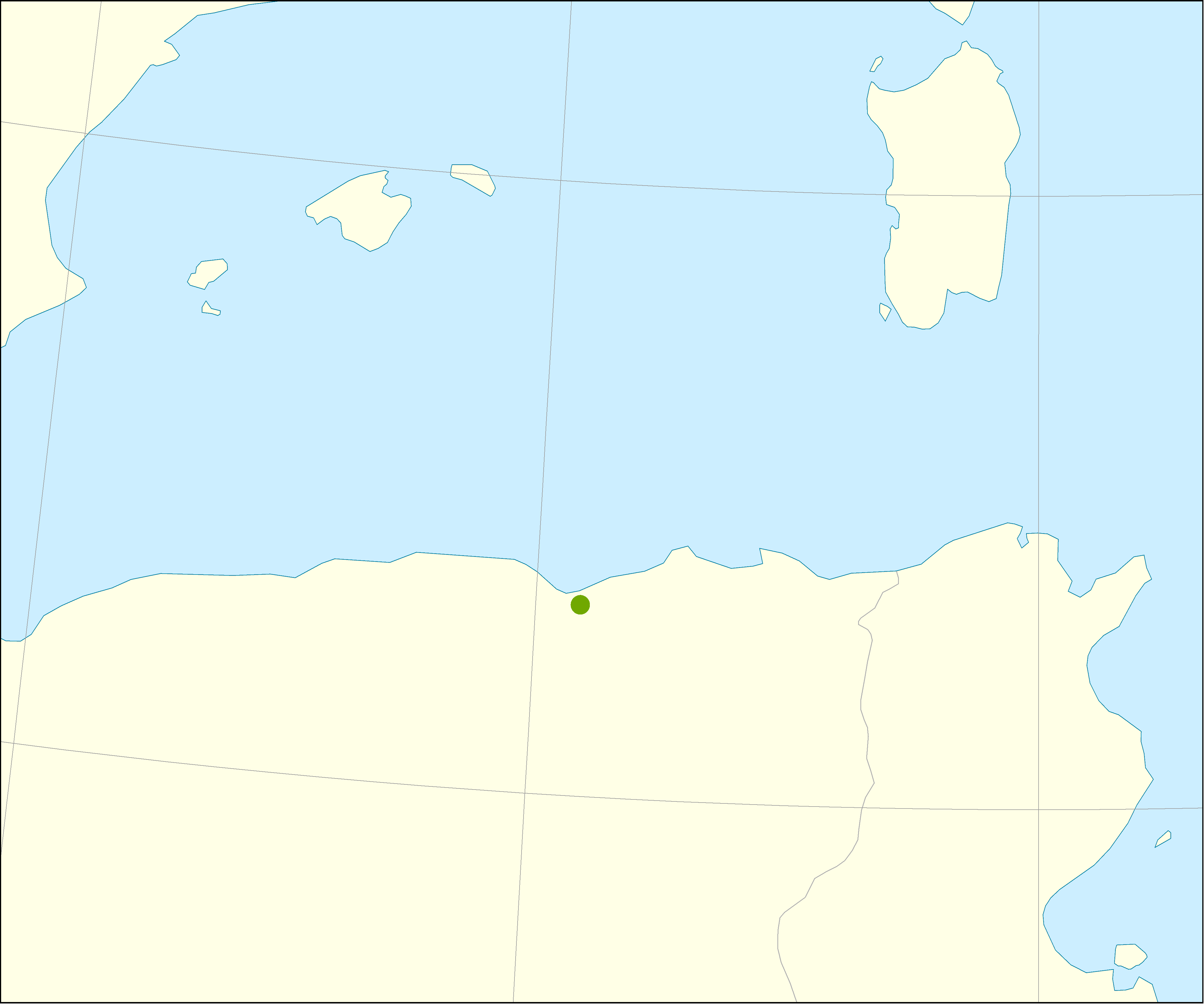
- Native range

= Abies numidica =

Algerian fir

Species of conifer

Abies numidica, the Algerian fir, is a species of fir found only in Algeria, where it is endemic to the Jebel Babor region, the second-highest mountain (2,004 m) in the Algerian Tell Atlas.

== Description ==
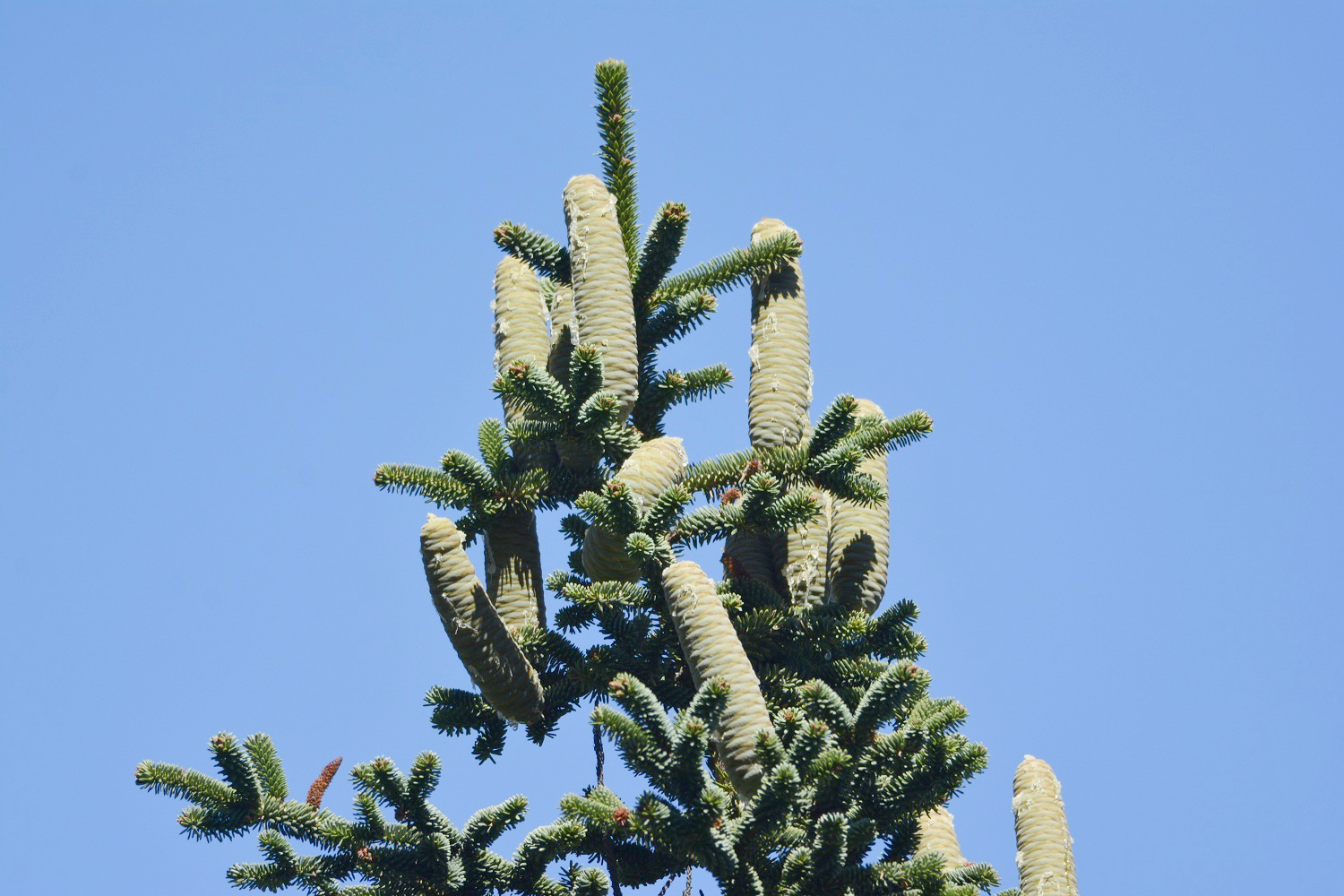
Foliage and cones, Jebel Babor

Abies numidica is a medium-sized to large evergreen tree growing to 20–35 m tall, with a trunk up to 1 m diameter. The leaves are needle-like, moderately flattened, 1.5–2.5 cm long and 2–3 mm wide by 1 mm thick, glossy dark green with a patch of greenish-white stomata near the tip above, and with two greenish-white bands of stomata below. The tip of the leaf is variable, usually pointed, but sometimes slightly notched at the tip, particularly on slow-growing shoots on older trees. The cones are glaucous green with a pink or violet tinge, maturing brown, 10–20 cm long and 4 cm broad, with about 150–200 scales, each scale with a short bract (not visible on the closed cone) and two winged seeds; they disintegrate when mature to release the seeds.

== Distribution ==
Abies numidica grows in a high-altitude Mediterranean climate at 1,800–2,004 m (and rarely down to 1,220 m) with an annual precipitation of 1,500–2,000 mm, the great majority of which falls as winter snow; the summers are warm and very dry. It is closely related to Abies pinsapo (Spanish fir), which occurs further west in the Rif mountains of Morocco and in southern Spain.

== Cultivation and uses ==
Algerian fir is occasionally grown as an ornamental tree in parks and larger gardens. It is valued among firs for its drought and atmospheric pollution tolerance.
