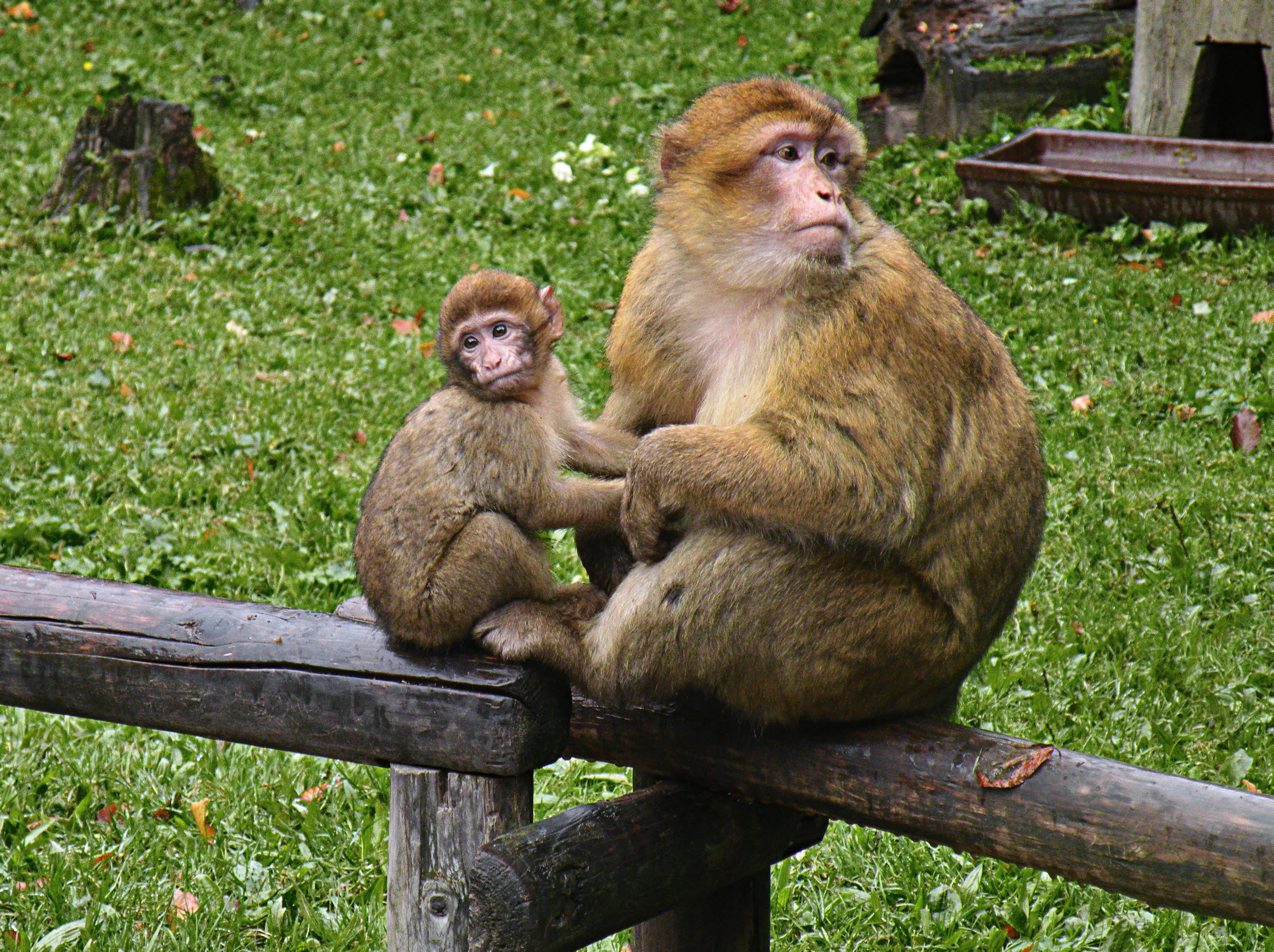
- Young Barbary macaque with its mother

Conservation status
- Endangered (IUCN 3.1)
- CITES Appendix I

Scientific classification
- Kingdom: Animalia
- Phylum: Chordata
- Class: Mammalia
- Order: Primates
- Family: Cercopithecidae
- Genus: Macaca
- Species: M. sylvanus

Binomial name
- Macaca sylvanus (Linnaeus, 1758)
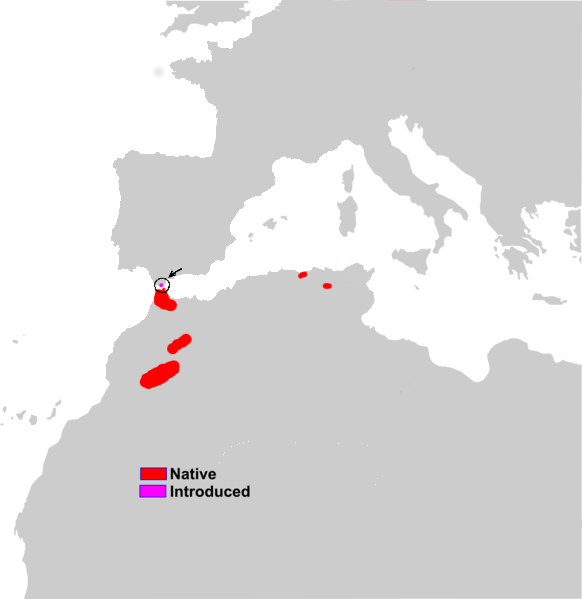
- Native range in red (northwest Africa); introduced range in violet (Gibraltar)

Synonyms
- Simia sylvanus Linnaeus, 1758; Inuus ecaudatus É. Geoffroy Saint-Hilaire, 1812; Simia inuus Linnaeus, 1766; Simia pithecus Schreber, 1799; Pithecus pygmaeus Reichenbach, 1863

= Barbary macaque =

Barbary macaque Temporal range: Early Pliocene–Recent

Species of Old World monkey

The Barbary macaque (Macaca sylvanus) is a macaque species native to the Atlas Mountains of Morocco, Algeria and Tunisia, along with a small introduced population in Gibraltar. It is the type species of the genus Macaca. From the Early Pliocene to the Late Pleistocene, until around 85–40,000 years ago, it was widely distributed in Europe. Today, the Barbary macaques in Gibraltar are the only Old World monkeys in Europe. About 300 individuals live on the Rock of Gibraltar. This population appears to be stable or increasing, while the North African population is declining.

The diet of the Barbary macaque consists primarily of plants and insects. Males play an atypical role in rearing young. Because of uncertain paternity, males are integral to raising all infants. Generally, both sexes and all ages contribute in alloparental care of the young. Males live to around 25 years old while females may live up to 30 years.

== Taxonomy and phylogeny ==
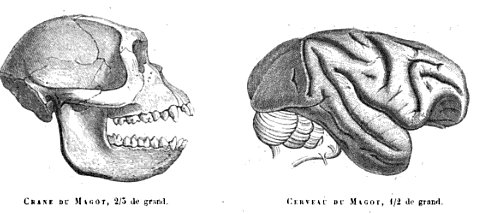
Skull and brain, as illustrated in Gervais' Histoire naturelle des mammifères

3d model of skeleton

The Barbary macaque is first described in scientific literature by Aristotle in the fourth century BCE work History of Animals. He writes of an ape with "arms like a man, only covered with hair", "feet [which] are exceptional in kind ... like large hands", and "a tail as small as small can be, just a sort of indication of a tail". It is likely that Galen (129 – c. 216) dissected the Barbary macaque in the second century CE, presuming the internal structure to be the same as a human. Such was the authority of his work, some mistakes he made were not corrected until Andreas Vesalius (1514–1564) proved otherwise over a thousand years later. The Barbary macaque was included in the grouping Simia by Conrad Gessner in his 1551 work Historia Animalium, a name which he claimed was already in use by the Greeks. Gessner's Simia was subsequently used as one of Carl Linnaeus' four primate genera when he published Systema Naturae in 1758. Linnaeus proposed the scientific name Simia sylvanus for the Barbary macaque. During the next 150 years primate taxonomy was subject to great changes and the Barbary macaque was placed in over thirty different taxa. The confusion over the use of Simia became so great that the International Commission on Zoological Nomenclature (ICZN) suppressed its use in 1929. This meant the Barbary macaque was placed in the next oldest genus assigned to it, Macaca, described by Bernard Germain de Lacépède in 1799.

=== Phylogeny ===
The Barbary macaque is the most basal macaque species. Phylogenetic and molecular analyses show it is a sister group to all Asian macaque species. The results of a phylogenetic analysis show that the chromosomes of Barbary macaque resemble those of the rhesus macaque with the exception of chromosomes 1, 4, 9, and 16. It was also discovered that chromosome 18 in the Barbary macaque is homologous to chromosome 13 in humans.

Polymerase chain reaction studies have found Alu element insertions, small pieces of genetic code in genomes, can infer primate phylogenetic relationships. Using this method the phylogenetic relationship of ten species within the genus Macaca has been resolved, showing the Barbary macaque to be a sister group to all other macaques.

Phylogeny of ten species of Macaca

- Macaca
  - Macaca sylvanus (Barbary macaque)
  - - - - - M. nigra (Celebes crested macaque)
      - - - M. silenus (lion-tailed macaque)
          - M. nemestrina (southern pig-tailed macaque)
    - - - M. radiata (bonnet macaque)
        - - - M. thibetana (Tibetan macaque)
            - M. arctoides (stump-tailed macaque)
      - - M. fascicularis (crab-eating macaque)
        - - - M. fuscata (Japanese macaque)
            - M. mulatta (rhesus macaque)

=== Fossil record ===
Barbary macaque fossils have been found across Europe, from the Atlantic Ocean to the Black Sea, dating from the Early Pliocene (Zanclean, 5.3 to 3.6 million years ago) to the Late Pleistocene, assigned to various subspecies including M. s. sylvanus, M. s. pliocena and M. s. florentina. The insular dwarf M. majori endemic to Sardinia-Corsica during the Early Pleistocene, usually considered to have derived from Barbary macaque, is generally considered a distinct species. Remains from Norfolk, England, dating to the Middle Pleistocene, at 53 degrees latitude, are amongst the northernmost records of non-human primates. Archaic humans and Barbary macaque remains were found co-occurring at numerous sites. It is thought possible that humans consumed Barbary macaques. The youngest known remains of a Barbary macaque in Europe were discovered at Hunas in Bavaria, Germany, dated to 85,000–40,000 years ago. The distribution of the Barbary macaque in Europe was likely strongly influenced by climate, only extending into Northern Europe during interglacial intervals. It was restricted to more southerly regions during colder glacial phases. The disappearance of the Barbary macaque in Europe may have been caused by humans.

Fossils of the Barbary macaque are known from the Guefaït-4.2 site in Morocco, dating to around the Pliocene-Pleistocene boundary approximately 2.6 million years ago where measurements of carbon isotopes and oxygen isotopes indicate that the macaque consumed primarily the fresh fruits and leaves of C_{3} plants.

== Description ==
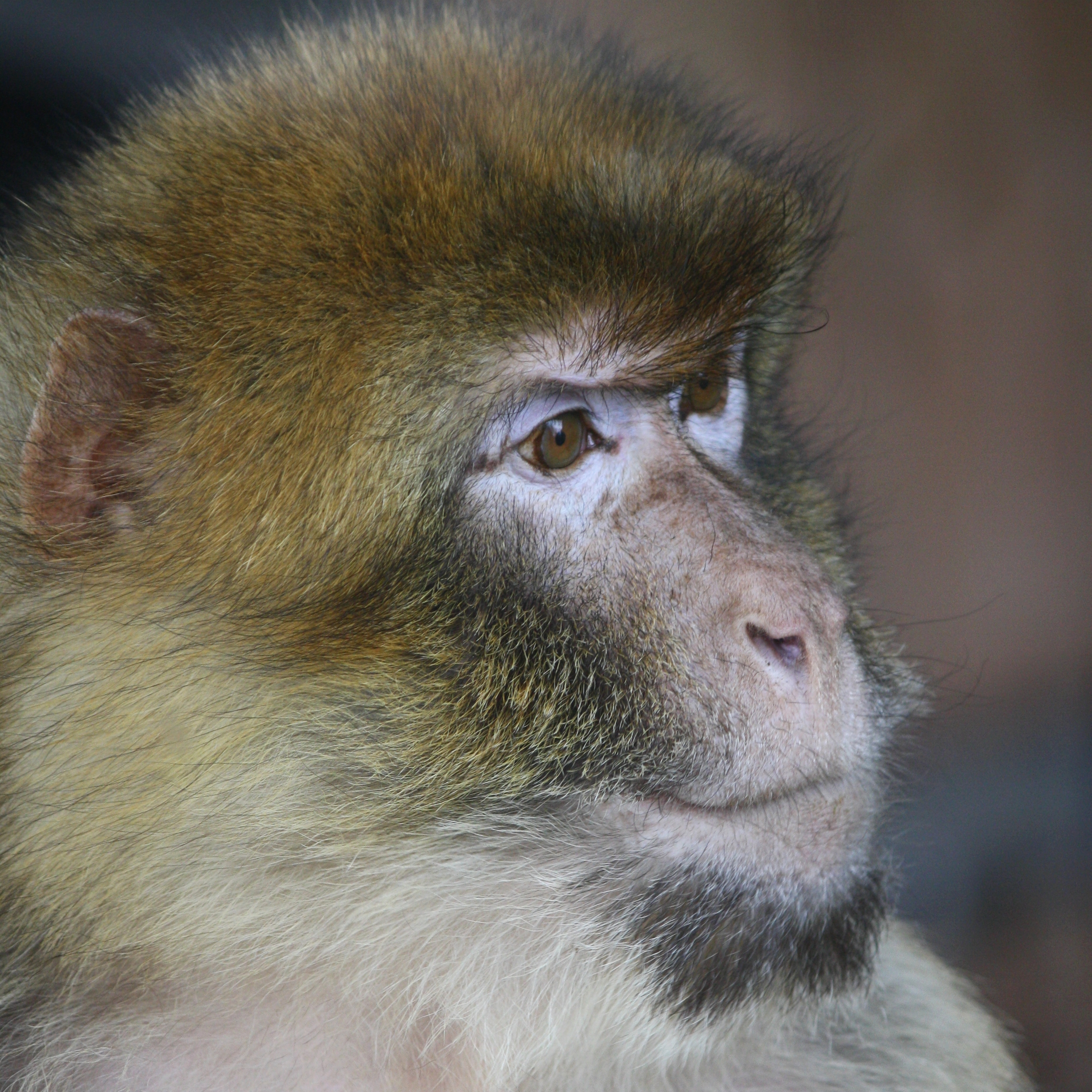
Head of individual at the Prague Zoo in Prague, Czech Republic

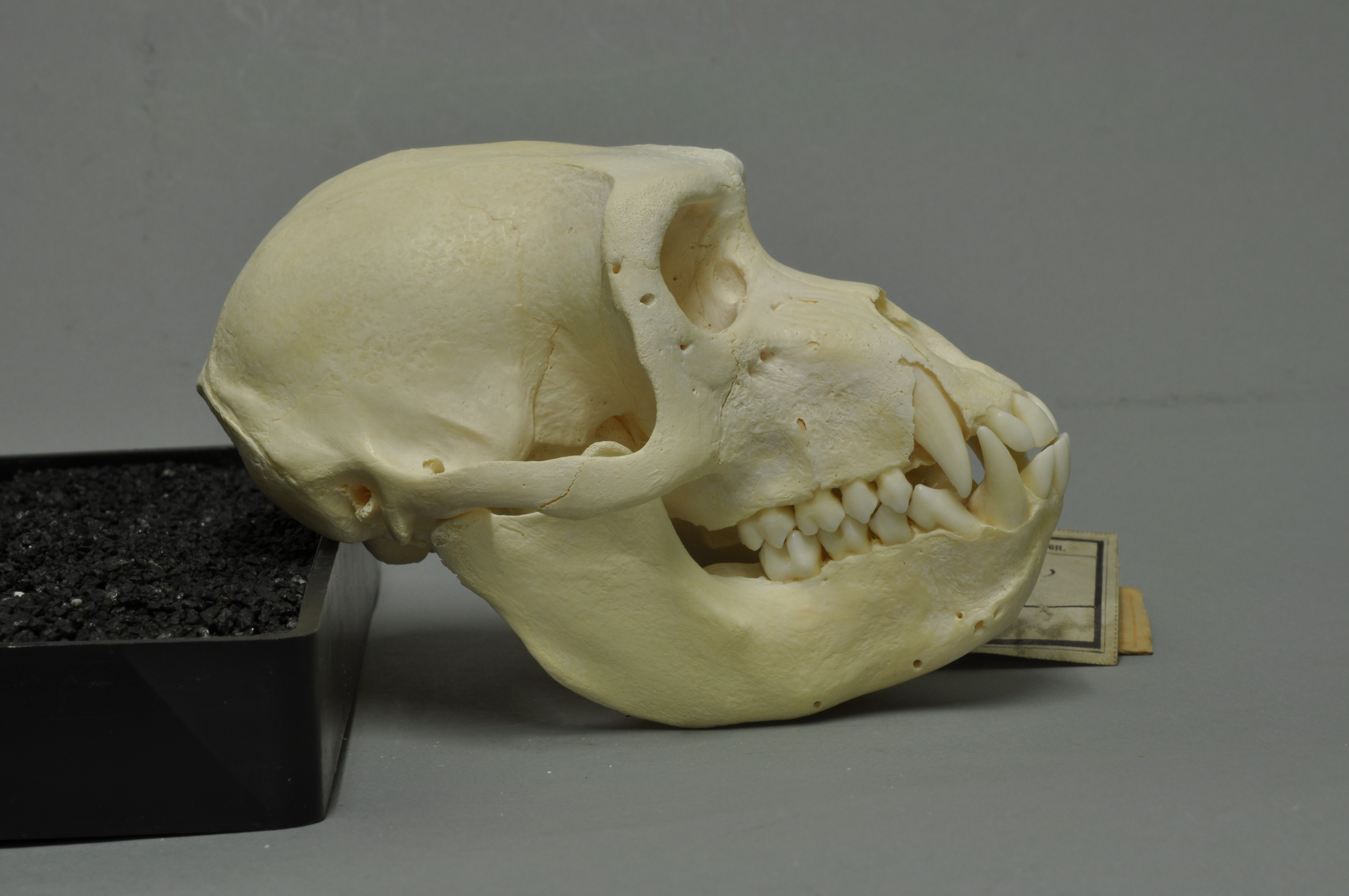
Skull photographed at the Museum Wiesbaden in Wiesbaden, Germany

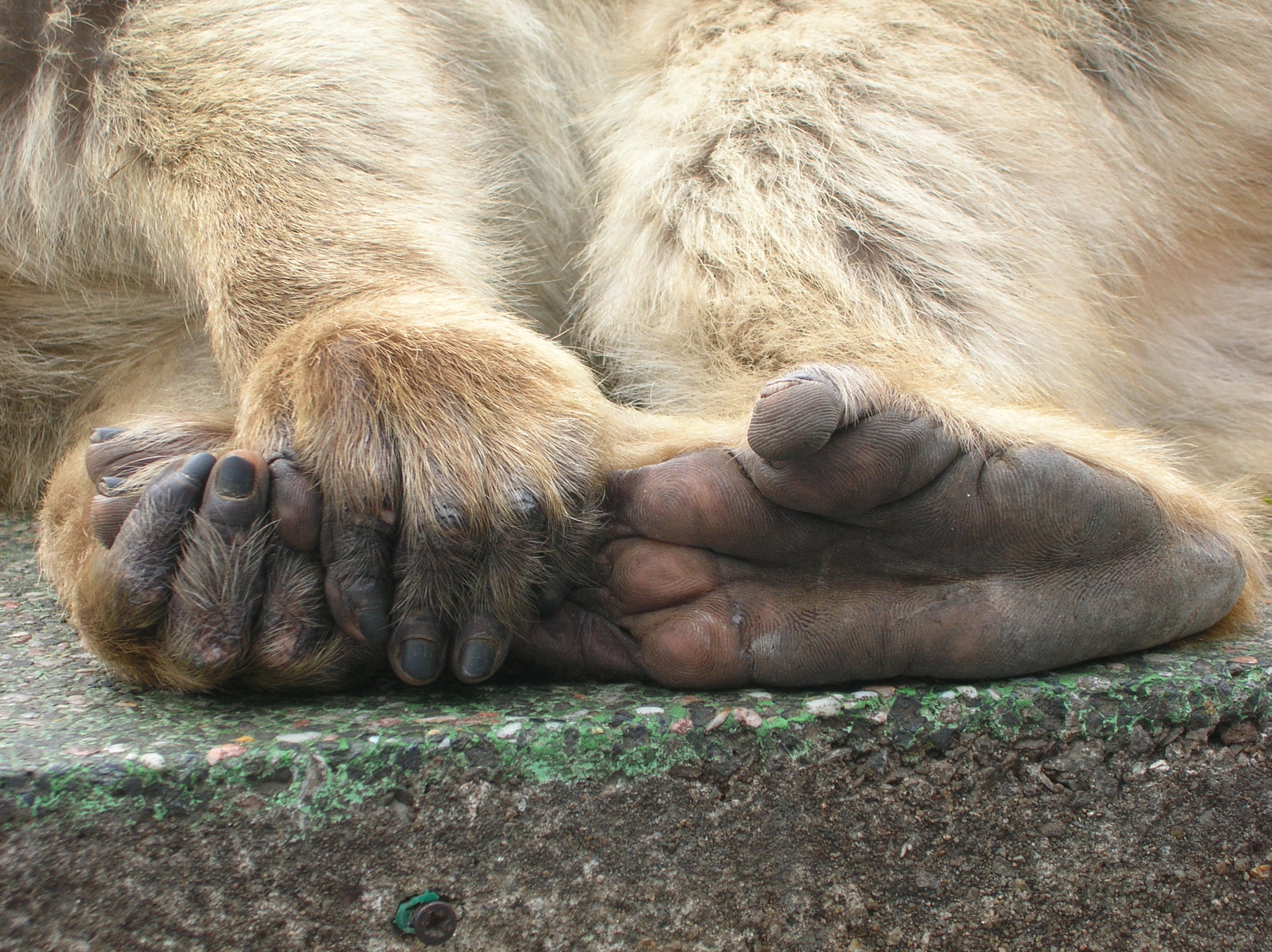
Hands and feet

The Barbary macaque has a dark pink face with a pale buff to golden brown to grey pelage and a lighter underside. The colour of mature adults changes with ages. In adults and subadults the fur on the back is variegated pale and dark which is due to banding on individual hairs. In spring to early summer, as the temperatures rise, the adult macaques moult their thick winter fur. The species shows sexual dimorphism with males larger than females. The mean head-body length is 55.7 cm (21.9 in) in females and 63.4 cm (25.0 in) in males. The boneless vestigial tail is greatly reduced compared with other macaque species and, if not absent, measures 4–22 mm (0.16–0.87 in). Males may have a more prominent tail, though data is scarce. The average body weight is 9.9–11 kg (22–24 lb) in females and 14.5–16 kg (32–35 lb) in males.

Like all Old World monkeys, the Barbary macaque has well-developed sitting pads (ischial callosities) on its rear. Females exhibit an exaggerated anogenital swelling, which increases in size during oestrus. It has cheek pouches and high-crowned bilophodont molars (molars with two ridges); the third molar is elongated. The diploid chromosome number of the Barbary macaque is 42, like other members of the Old World monkey tribe Papionini.

== Distribution and habitat ==
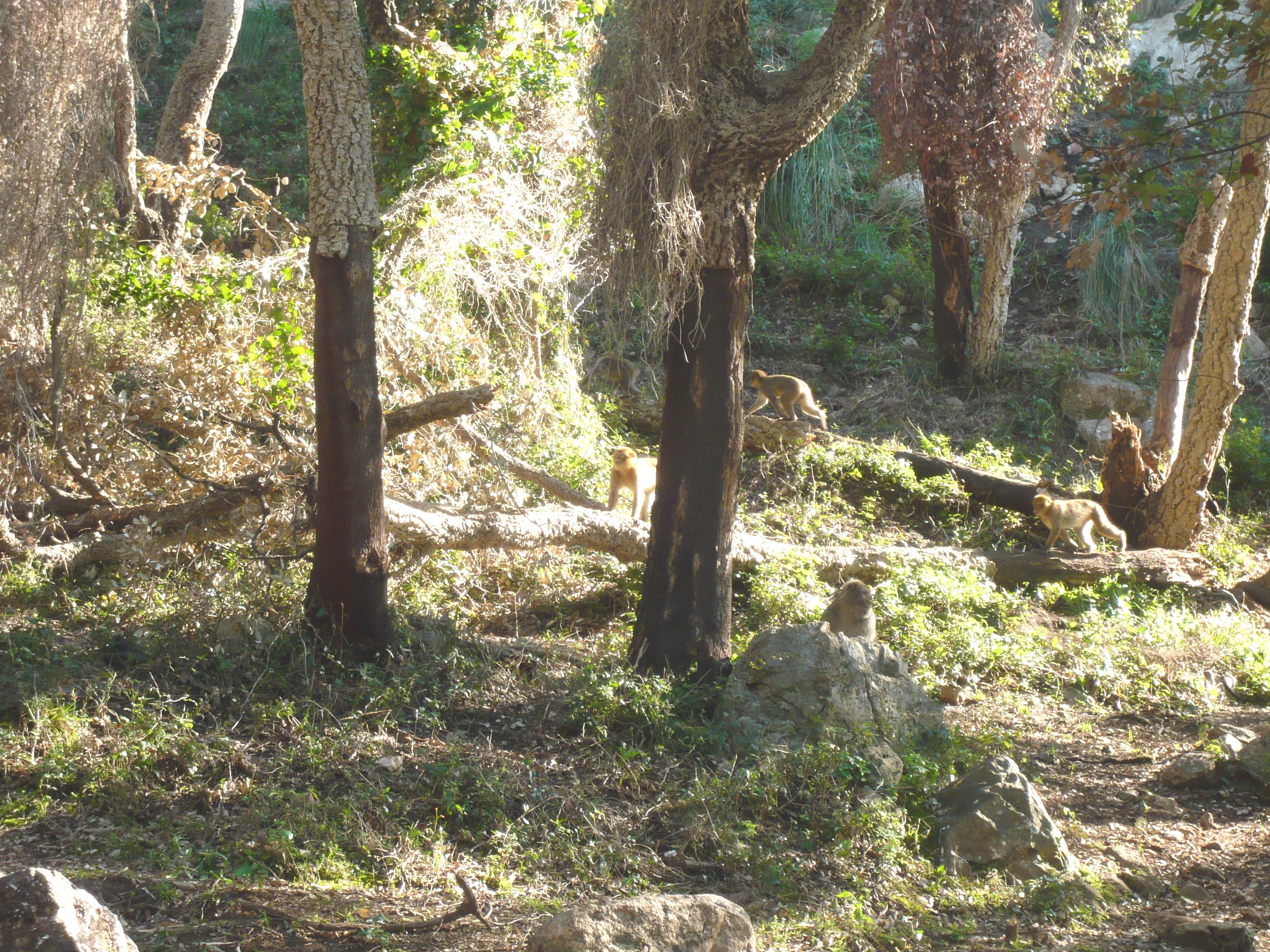
Barbary macaques at Ziama Mansouriah in Jijel Province, Algeria

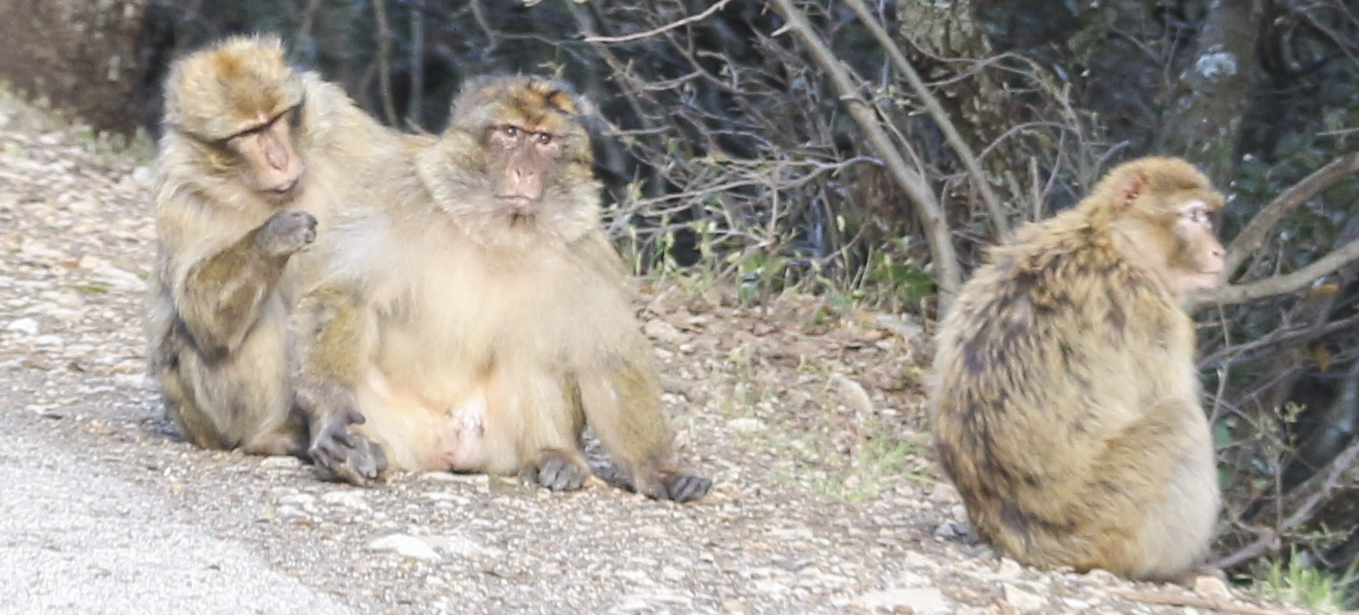
Barbary macaque in Michlifen forest, Middle Atlas

Historically, the Barbary macaque occurred across North Africa from Libya to Morocco. It is the only monkey in Africa that survives north of the Sahara. It lives mainly in fragmented areas of the Rif and the Middle and High Atlas mountain ranges in Morocco and the Grande and Petite Kabylie mountain region in Algeria. It has been recorded at elevations of 400–2,300 m (1,300–7,500 ft), though it seems to prefer higher elevations. The Moroccan and Algerian populations are around 700 km (430 mi) apart, although the gap was smaller during the Holocene.

The Barbary macaque also occurs in the British Overseas Territory of Gibraltar at the southern tip of Europe's Iberian Peninsula. Gibraltar historian Alonso Hernández del Portillo noted in the early 17th century that the macaques had been present "from time immemorial". Most likely, the Moors introduced macaques from North Africa to Gibraltar during the Middle Ages. During World War II, Winston Churchill ordered for more Barbary macaques to be introduced to Gibraltar to reverse population declines. Today, there are around 300 Barbary macaques in Gibraltar.

It can live in a variety of habitats, such as cedar, fir, and oak forests, grasslands, thermophilous scrub, and rocky ridges full of vegetation in Mediterranean climate with seasonal extremes of temperature. In Morocco, most Barbary macaques inhabit Atlas cedar (Cedrus atlantica) forests, but this could reflect the present habitat availability rather than a specific preference for this habitat. In Algeria, the Barbary macaque inhabits mainly Grande and Petite Kabylia, ranges that form part of the Tell Atlas mountain chain, but there is also an isolated population in Chréa National Park. It lives in mixed cedar and holm oak forests, humid Portuguese and cork oak forests, and scrub-covered gorges.

Fossil evidence indicates that the Barbary macaque occurred in southern Europe during the Pleistocene and during interglacial periods also in England. A Tunisian population was mentioned in the works of ancient Greek writer Herodotus, indicating the species has become extinct there within the last 2,500 years.

== Behaviour and ecology ==
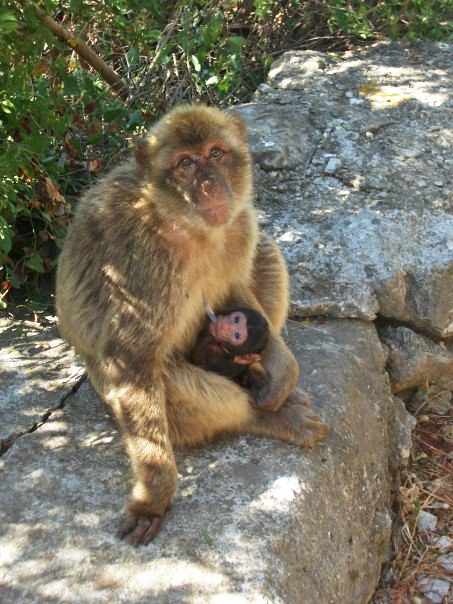
Female Barbary macaque with young suckling

The Barbary macaque is gregarious, forming mixed groups of several females and males. Troops can have 10 to 100 individuals and are matriarchal, with their hierarchy determined by lineage to the lead female. Unlike other macaques, the males participate in rearing the young. Males may spend a considerable amount of time playing with and grooming infants. In this way, a strong social bond is formed between males and juveniles, both the male's own offspring and those of others in the troop. This may be a result of selectivity on the part of the females, who may prefer highly parental males.

The mating season runs from November through March. The gestation period is 147 to 192 days, and females usually have only one offspring per pregnancy. Females rear twins in rare instances. Offspring reach maturity at three to four years of age, and may live for 20 years or more.

Grooming other Barbary macaques leads to lower stress levels for the individuals that do the grooming. While stress levels do not appear to be reduced in animals that are groomed, grooming more individuals leads to even lower stress levels; this is a benefit that might outweigh the costs to the groomer, which include less time to participate in other activities such as foraging. The mechanism for reducing stress may be explained by the social relationships (and support) that are formed by grooming.

Male Barbary macaques interfere in conflicts and form coalitions with other males, usually with related males rather than with unrelated males. These relationships suggest that males do so in order to indirectly increase their own fitness. Furthermore, males form coalitions with closely related kin more often than they do with distantly related kin. These coalitions are not permanent and may change frequently as male ranking within the group changes. Although males are more likely to form coalitions with males who have helped them in the past, this is not as important as relatedness in determining coalitions. Males avoid conflicting with higher ranking males and will more frequently form coalitions with the higher ranking male in a conflict. Close grouping of males occur when infant Barbary macaques are present. Interactions between males are commonly initiated when a male presents an infant macaque to an adult male who is not caring for an infant, or when an unattached male approaches males who are caring for infants. This behaviour leads to a type of social buffering, which reduces the number of antagonistic interactions among males in a group.

An open mouth display by the Barbary macaque is used most commonly by juvenile macaques as a sign of playfulness.

=== Alarm calls ===
The main purpose of calls in Barbary macaques is to alert other group members to possible dangers such as predators. Barbary macaques can discriminate calls by individuals in their own group from those by individuals in other groups of conspecific macaques. Neither genetic variation nor habitat differences are likely causes of acoustic variation in the calls of different social groups. Instead, minor variations in acoustic structure among groups similar to the vocal accommodation seen in humans are the likely cause. However, acoustic characteristics such as pitch and loudness are varied based on the vocalizations of individuals they associate with, and social situations play a role in the acoustic structure of calls.

Barbary macaque females have the ability to recognize their own offspring's calls through a variety of acoustic parameters. Because of this, infant calls do not have to differ dramatically for mothers to be able to recognize their own infant's call. Mothers demonstrate different behaviours on hearing the calls of other infant macaques as opposed to the calls of their own offspring. More parameters for vocalizations lead to more reliable identification of calls in both infants and in adult macaques so it is not surprising that the same acoustic characteristics that are heard in infant calls are also heard in adult calls.

=== Mating ===
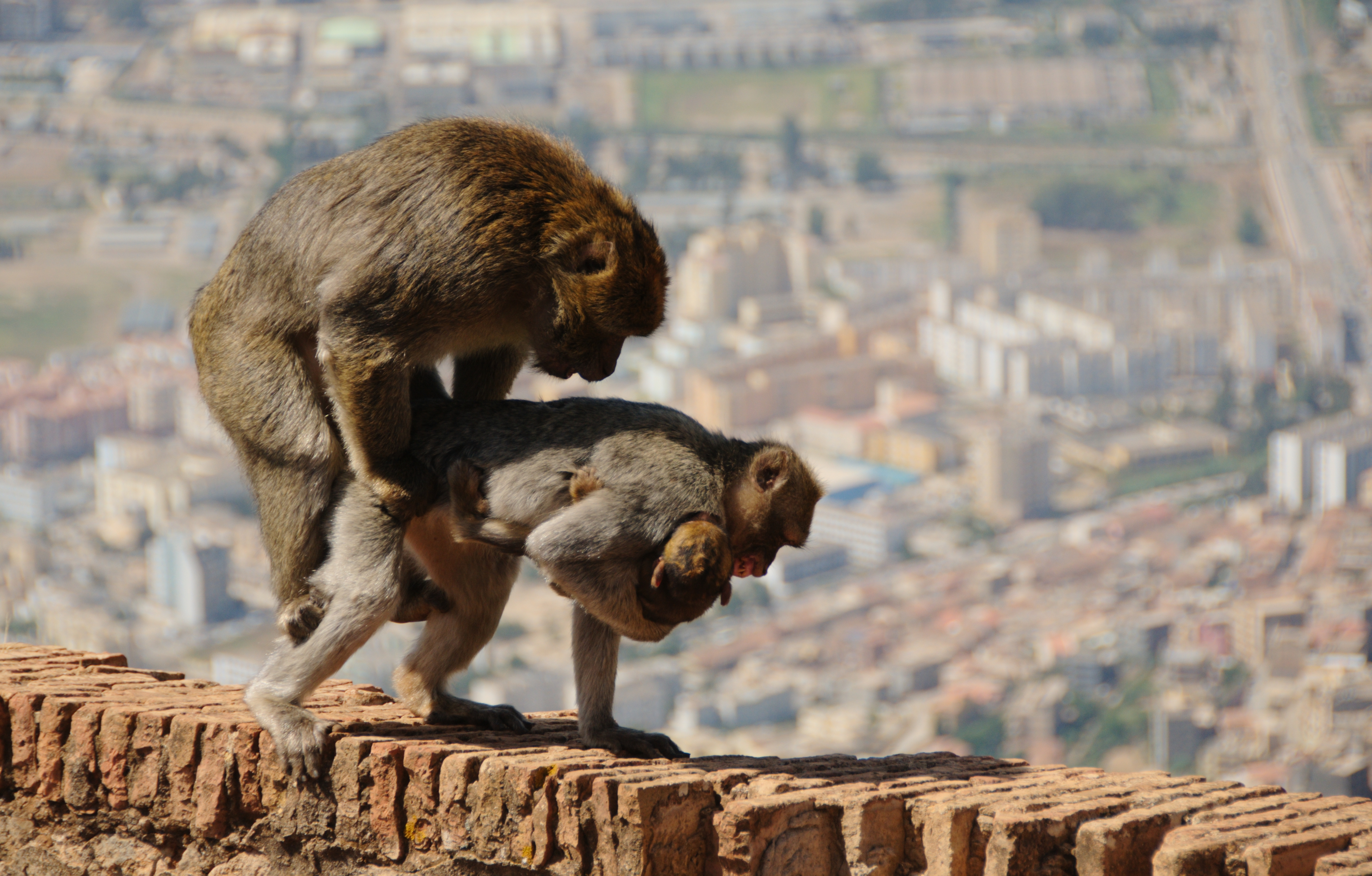
Barbary macaques mating in Béjaïa

Although Barbary macaques are sexually active at all points during a female's reproductive cycle, male Barbary macaques determine a female's most fertile period by sexual swellings on the female. Mating is most common during a female's most fertile period. The swelling size of the female reaches a maximum around the time of ovulation, suggesting that size helps a male predict when he should mate. This is further supported by the fact that male ejaculation peaks at the same time that female sexual swelling peaks. Change in female sexual behaviour around the time of ovulation is insufficient to demonstrate to the male that the female is fertile. The swellings, therefore, appear necessary for predicting fertility.

Barbary macaque females differ from other nonhuman primates in that they often mate with a majority of the males in their social group. While females are active in choosing sexual associations, the mating behaviour of macaque social groups is not entirely determined by female choice. These multiple matings by females decrease the certainty of paternity of male Barbary macaques and may lead them to care for all infants within the group. For a male to ensure his reproductive success, he must maximize his time spent around the females in the group during their fertile periods. Injuries to male macaques peak during the fertile period, which points to male-male competition as an important determinant of male reproductive success. Not allowing a female to mate with other males, however, would be costly to the male, since doing so would not allow him to mate with more females.

=== Parenting ===
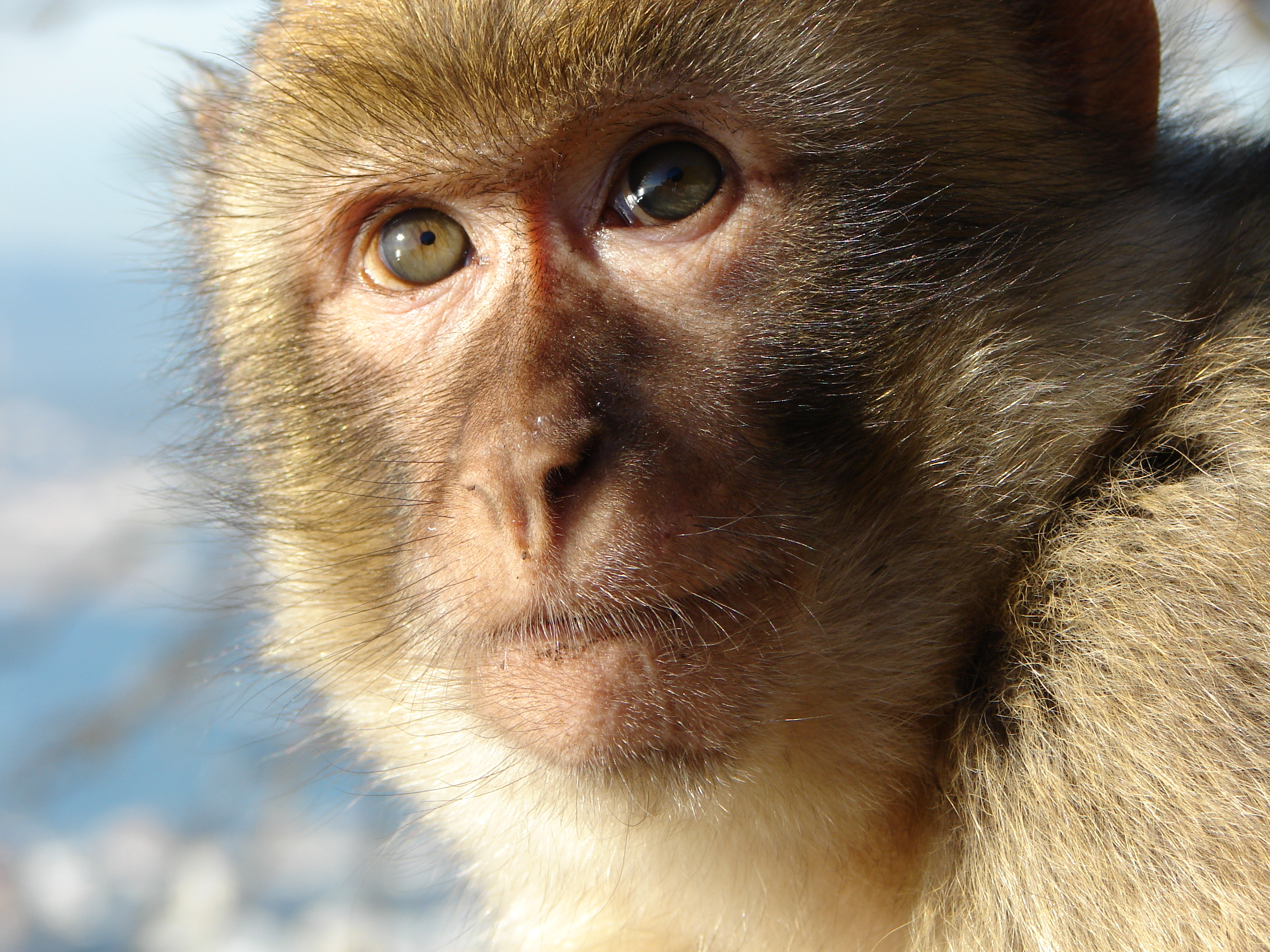
Closeup of the face of a juvenile in Gibraltar

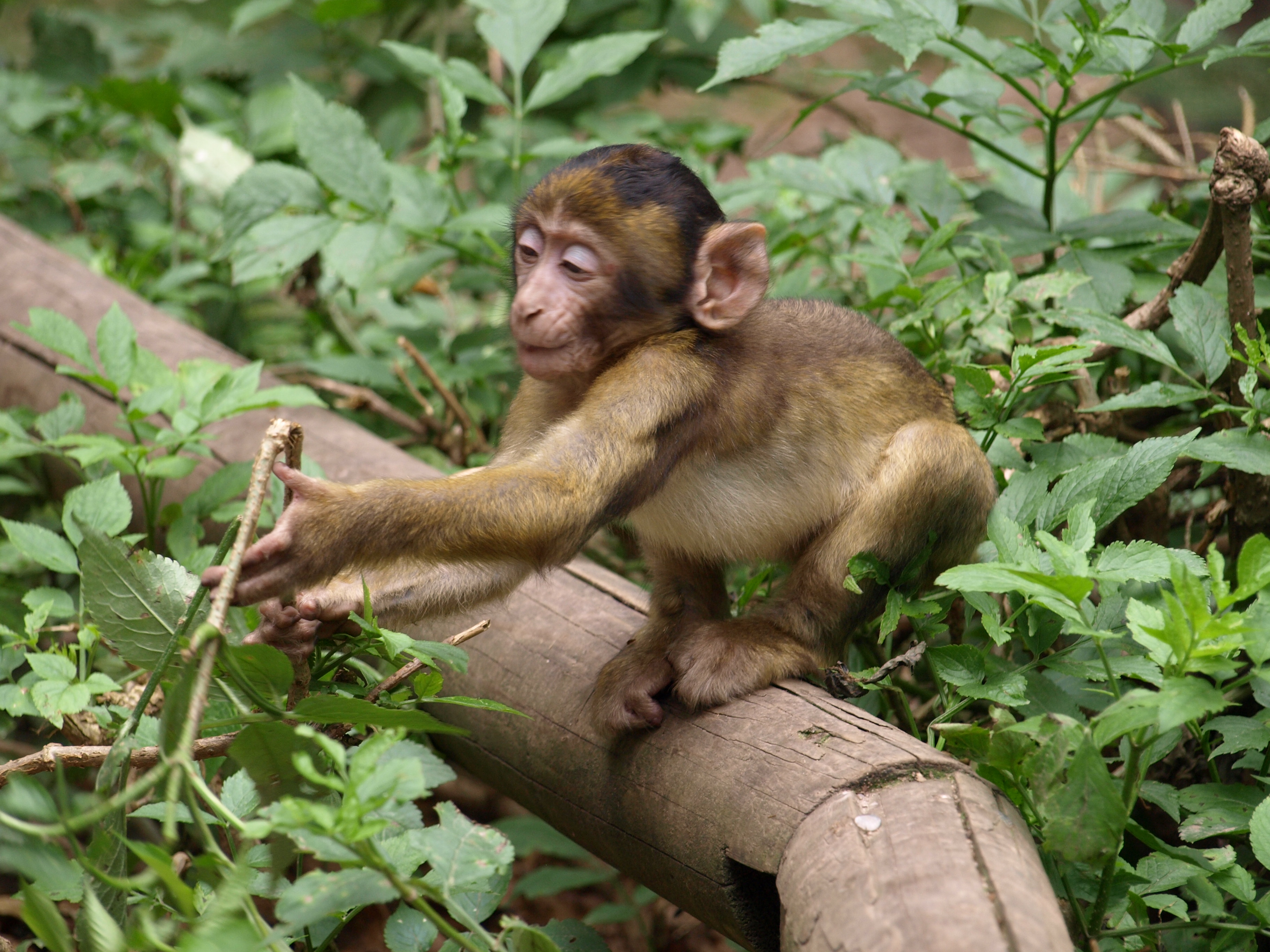
A young macaque at the Montagne des Singes, Alsace

Barbary macaques from all age and sex groups participate in alloparental care of infants. Male care of infants has been of particular interest to research because high levels of care from males are uncommon in groups where paternity is highly uncertain. Males even act as true alloparents of infant macaques by carrying them and caring for them for hours at a time as opposed to just demonstrating more casual interactions with the infants. The social status of females plays a role in female alloparental interactions with infants. Higher-ranking females have more interactions, whereas younger, lower-ranking females have less access to infants.

=== Diet ===
The diet of the Barbary macaque consists of a mixture of plants and insect prey. It consumes a large variety of gymnosperms and angiosperms. Almost every part of the plant is eaten, including flowers, fruits, seeds, seedlings, leaves, buds, bark, gum, stems, roots, bulbs, and corms. Common prey caught and consumed by Barbary macaques are snails, earthworms, scorpions, spiders, centipedes, millipedes, grasshoppers, termites, water striders, scale insects, beetles, butterflies, moths, ants, and even tadpoles.

Barbary macaques can cause major damage to the trees in their prime habitat, the Atlas cedar forests in Morocco. Since deforestation in Morocco has become a major environmental problem in recent years, research has been conducted to determine the cause of the bark stripping behaviour demonstrated by these macaques. Cedar trees are also vital to this population of Barbary macaques as an area with cedars can support a much higher density of macaques than one without them. A lack of a water source and exclusion of monkeys from water sources are major causes of cedar bark stripping behaviour in Barbary macaques. Density of macaques, however, is less correlated with the behaviour than the other causes considered.

=== Predators ===
The Barbary macaque's main predators are the domestic dog, leopard and eagles; the golden eagle may prey only on cubs, since it is not morphologically adapted to hunt primates. The approach of eagles and domestic dogs is known to elicit an alarm call response.

== Threats ==
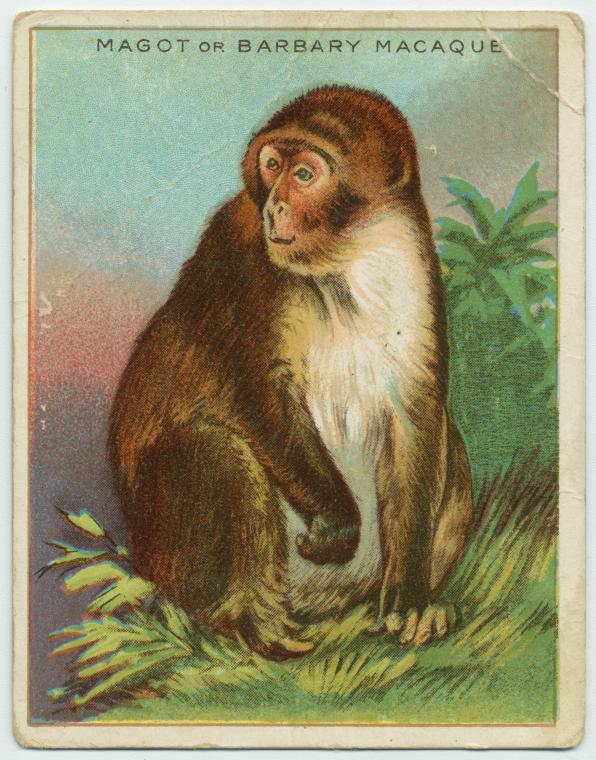
19th century illustration

Wild populations of Barbary macaques have suffered a major decline in recent years to the point of being declared an endangered species on the IUCN Red List since 2008. The Barbary macaque is threatened by fragmentation and degradation of forest habitat, and poaching for the illegal pet trade; it is also killed in retaliation for raiding crops. Today, no accurate data exists on the location and number of individuals out of their natural habitat. An unknown number of individuals are living in zoological collections, at other institutions, in private hands, in quarantine, or waiting to be relocated to appropriate destinations.

The habitat of the Barbary macaque is under threat from increased logging activity. Local farmers regard the Barbary macaque as pest and engage in its extermination. Once common throughout northern Africa and southern Mediterranean Europe, only an estimated 12,000 to 21,000 Barbary macaques are left in Morocco and Algeria. Once, its distribution was much more extensive, spreading east through Algeria, Tunisia and Libya, and north to the United Kingdom. Its range is no longer continuous, with only isolated areas of range remaining. By the Pleistocene, it inhabited the warmer Mediterranean regions of Europe, from the Balearic Islands and mainland Iberia and France in the west, east to Italy, Sicily, Malta, and as far north as Germany and Norfolk in the British Isles. The species decreased with the arrival of the last Last Glacial Period, going functionally extinct on the Iberian Peninsula except for Gibraltar around 30,000 years ago.

The Barbary macaque is threatened by habitat loss, overgrazing, and illegal capture. In Morocco, tourists interact with Barbary macaques in many regions. Information collected in the interviews with inhabitants in the High Atlas of Morocco indicated that the capture of macaques occurs in these regions. Conflict between local people and wild macaques is one of the greatest challenges to Barbary macaque conservation in Morocco. The main threats to the survival of Barbary macaques in this region have been found to be habitat destruction and the impact of livestock grazing, but problems of conflict with inhabitants are also increasing due to crop raiding and the illegal capture of macaques. Human–macaque conflict is mainly due to crop raiding. In the High Atlas of Morocco, macaques attract a large number of tourists every year, and they are favoured for their potential benefits to tourism. In addition, macaques have some ecological roles; for example, they are the predators of several destructive insects and pests of plants and participate in seed dispersal in many plant species.

In the Central High Atlas, the Barbary macaque occurs in relatively small and fragmented areas restricted to the main valleys at elevations of 700–2,400 m (2,300–7,900 ft). In a 2013 study, researchers reported that they found Barbary macaques in relatively small and fragmented habitats in 10 sites, and that the species no longer occurred in four localities. This could be attributed to habitat degradation, hunting activities, the impact of livestock grazing, and disturbance by people. As deforestation for agriculture and overgrazing continues, the remaining forest becomes increasingly fragmented. Consequently, the Barbary macaque is now restricted to small, fragmented relict habitats.

=== Human use and tourism ===
Many of the mistaken ideas about human anatomy contained in the writings of Galen are apparently due to his use of the Barbary macaque, the only anthropoid available to him, in dissections. Strong cultural taboos of his time prevented his performing any dissections of human cadavers, even in his role as physician and teacher of physicians.

Macaques in Morocco are frequently used as photo props, despite their protected status. Tourists are encouraged to take photos with the animals for a fee. Macaques are also sold as pets in Morocco and Algeria, and exported to Europe to be used as pets and fighting monkeys, both in physical marketplaces and online.

Tourists interact with wild monkeys across the globe, and in some situations, tourists may be encouraged to feed, photograph, and touch the monkeys. Although tourism has the potential to bring in money towards conservation goals and provides an incentive for the protection of natural habitats, close proximity and interactions with tourists can also have significant psychological impacts on the Barbary macaques. Fecal samples and stress-indicating behaviours, such as belly scratching, indicate that the presence of tourists has a negative impact on the macaques. Human activities such as taking photographs cause the animals stress, possibly because the people come too close to the animals and make prolonged eye contact (a sign of aggression in many primates). Macaques that live in areas close to human contact have more parasites and poorer overall health than those that live in wilder environments, at least in part due to the unhealthy diets they receive as a result of feeding from humans.

Several groups of Barbary macaques can be found in tourist sites, where they are affected by the presence of visitors providing food to them. Researchers comparing two such groups in the central High Atlas mountains in 2008 found that the tourist group of Barbary macaques spent significantly more time engaged in resting and aggressive behaviour, and foraged and moved significantly less than the wild group. The tourist group spent significantly less time per day feeding on herbs, seeds, and acorns than the wild group. Human food accounted for 26% of the daily feeding records for the tourist group, and 1% for the wild-feeding group. Scientists who collected data on the seasonal activity budget and diet composition of the endangered Barbary macaque group inhabiting a tourist site in Morocco found that activity budgets and diet of the study group varied markedly among seasons and habitats. The percentage of daily time spent in foraging and moving was lowest in spring, and the daily time spent in resting was highest in spring and summer. The time budget devoted to aggressive display was highest in spring than the other three seasons. There is an increase in the daily feeding time spent eating flowers and fruits in summer, seeds, acorns, roots and barks in winter and autumn, herbs in spring and summer, and a clear increase in consumption of the human food in spring. The tourist and the wild groups did not differ in the proportion of daily records devoted to terrestrial feeding, but the tourist group spent a significantly lower percentage of daily records in terrestrial foraging, moving and resting, while performing more terrestrial aggressive displays more than the wild group. There was no significant difference between the two groups in the proportion of terrestrial feeding records spent eating fruits; but the tourist group had lower daily percentages of terrestrial feeding on leaves, seeds and acorns, roots and barks, and herbs, while it spent higher daily percentages of terrestrial feeding on human food.

Barbary macaques were traded or perhaps given as diplomatic gifts as long ago as the Iron Age, as indicated by remains found in such sites as Emain Macha in Ireland, dating to no later than 95 BC; an Iron Age hillfort, the Titelberg in Luxembourg; and two Roman sites in Britain.

== See also ==
- Djebel Babor Nature Reserve
- Trentham Estate
