= Mogods =

Coordinates: 37°08′N 9°30′E

- Map of the natural regions of Northern Tunisia

Highest point
- Peak: Djebel Ichkeul
- Elevation: 510 m (1,670 ft)

Geography
- Country: Tunisia

Geology
- Rock age: Precambrian

The Mogods are Mountain ranges of Northern Tunisia, culminating at 500 meters height. They constitute the limit of the region of Khroumire.

== Location ==
The Mogods are situated between the seaside at north and the Medjerda River valley at the South, at the extremity of the Atlas Mountains.

== Sources ==
- Muller, Serge D.; Daoud-Bouattour, Amina; Belouahem-Abed, Djamila; Ben Haj Jilani, Imtinène; Semia Ben Saad-Limam; Mohamed Benslama; Hafawa Ferchichi-Ben Jamaa; Laïla Rhazi; Zeineb Ghrabi-Gammar (2010). "Peat mosses (Sphagnum) and related plant communities of North Africa. I. The Numidian-Kroumirian range (Algeria-Tunisia)" (PDF). Flora Mediterranea (20): 159–178.
- Ministère de l'Environnement, Pour une stratégie sur la diversité biologique à l’horizon 2020 (PDF), vol. I: Cadre général, ressources naturelles et gestion des écosystèmes, archived from the original (PDF) on 19 April 2014
