= Isaak Mountain =

Mountain in Tizi N'Berber, Algeria

Mountain Isaak
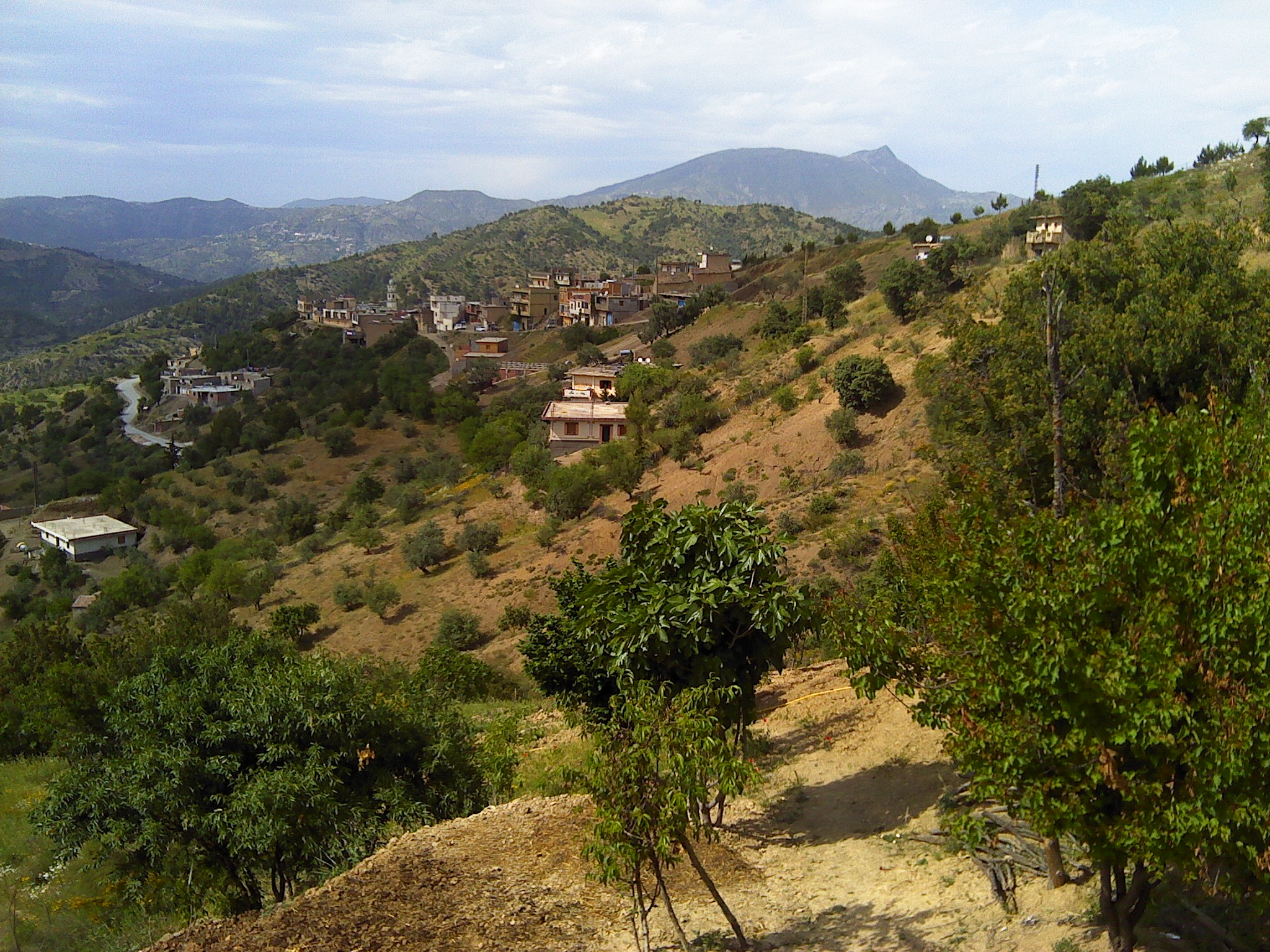

Highest point
- Elevation: 1,742 m (5,715 ft)
- Coordinates: 36.5114557°N 5.0594186°E

Geography
- Tizi N'Berber - Aokas District - Béjaïa Province
- Parent range: Babor Mountains - Tell Atlas

Geology
- Rock age: Quaternary

Isaak Mountain is a peak in the Babor Mountains range of the Tell Atlas in Algeria, located in the municipality of Tizi N'Berber in the Aokas District.

== Description ==
Isaak Mountain is the third highest mountain peak in Béjaïa, at 1,742 m (5,715 ft), right after Babor Mountain 2,004 m (6,575 ft) and Takintosht 1,874 m (6,148 ft), overlooking the eastern Gulf of Béjaïa, and the Soummam Basin, and facing the Babor Mountains and the Djurdjura Mountains.

It is offset by Takintosht in the south of the Soummam Basin, and Yma Quraya Mountain in the west of the Béjaïa Bay, where the city of Béjaïa was established.

The summit of the mountain can be reached via a single national road, National Road 75.

The mountain overlooks the municipality of Aokas and the municipality of Tichy, among other coastal municipalities.

== Geology ==
The formation of Isaak Mountain dates back to the Quaternary of the Cenozoic on the geologic time scale.

The surrounding terrain is characterized by gray marble that is connected by paths of reddish siderite and iron ore.

The composition of this terrain is also characterized by an amount of crystalline schist and mica schist.

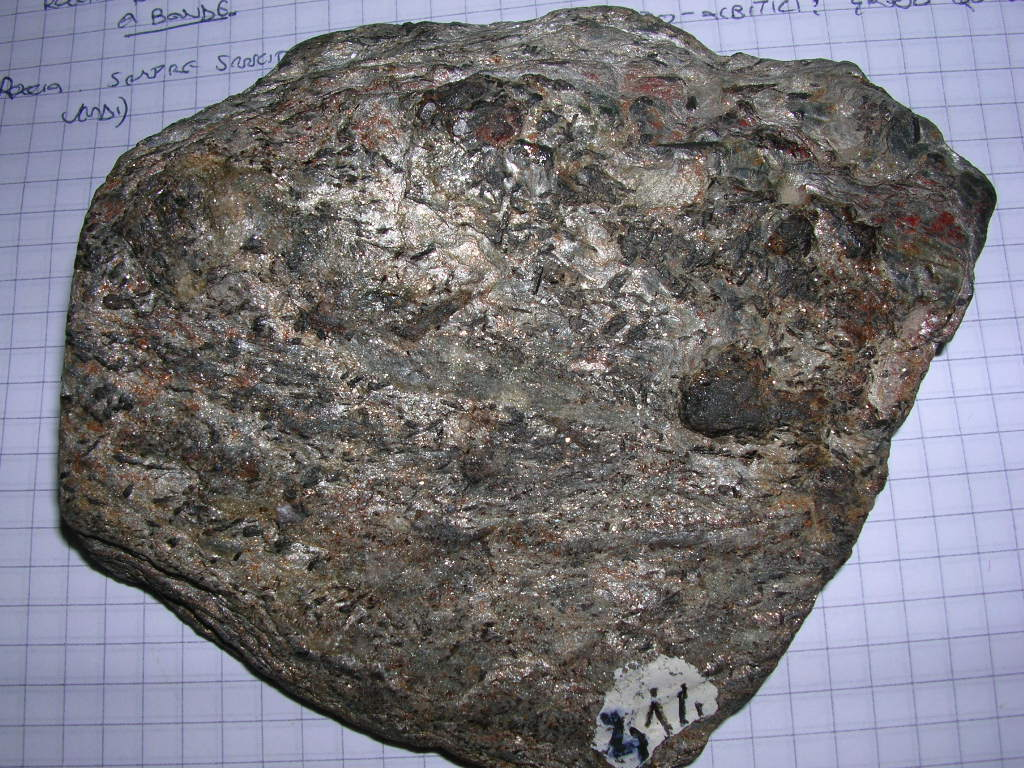
Mica-schist

== Quarries ==
Around the foothill of Isaak Mountain are several quarries that specialize in the extraction of:

- Rocks.
- Marble.
- Sand.
- Gravel.
- Clay for ceramics.
- Non-metallic ores.

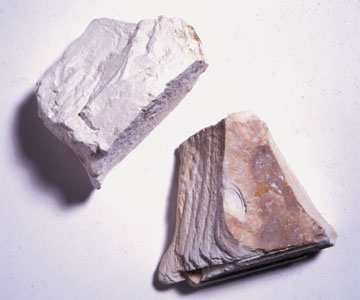
Clay

These quarries are located at Gedi Ali 1, Gedi Ali 2, and Isaak.

== Valleys ==
A lot of valleys either originate or surround Isaak Mountain, including:

- Amaseen Valley.

== Dams and lakes ==
- Egil Amda Dam
- Egzer Oftis Dam

== Ecological diversity ==
=== Trees ===
Many types of trees surround Isaak Mountain and it's it's forests.

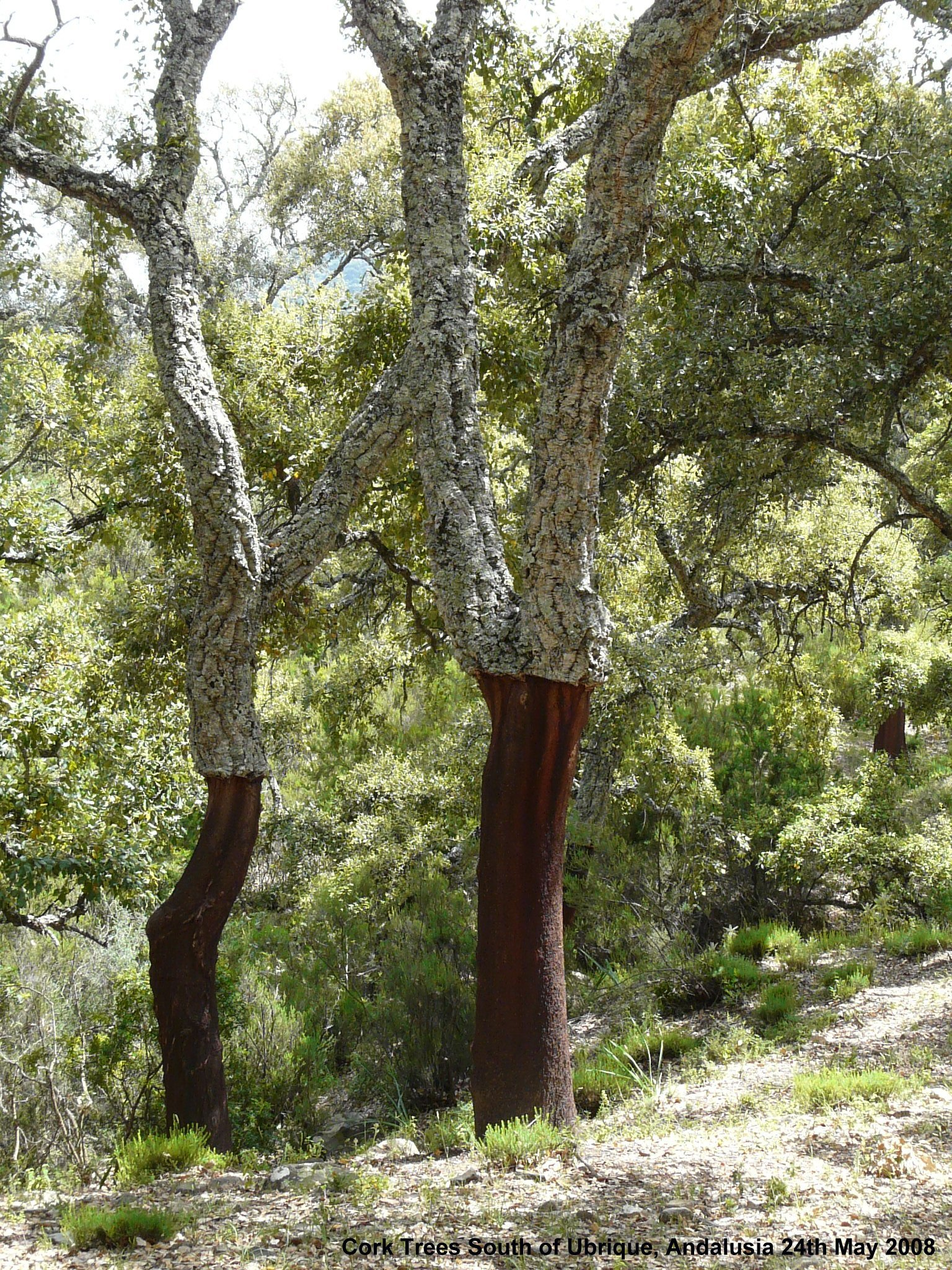
Quercus suber

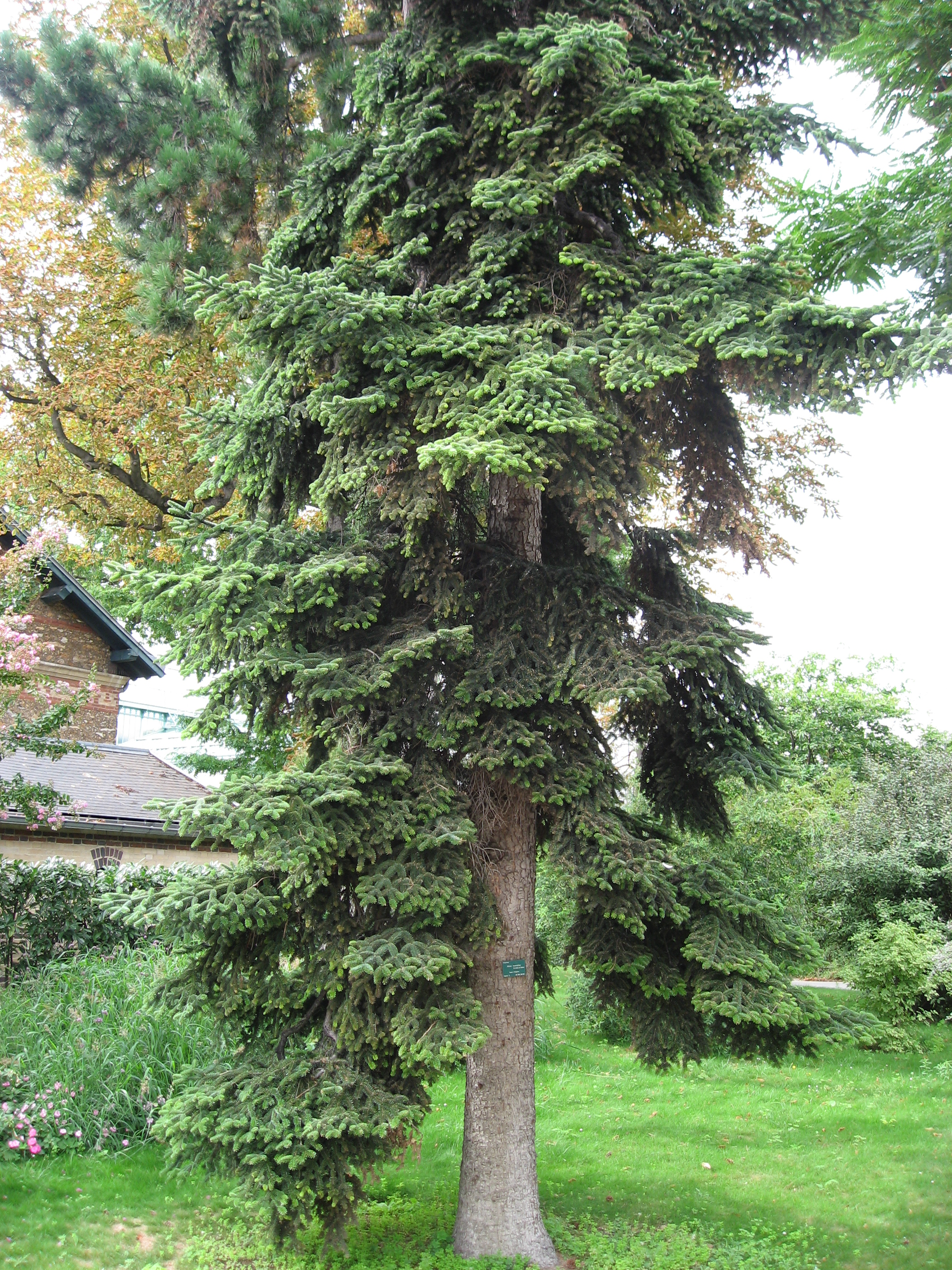
Abies numidica

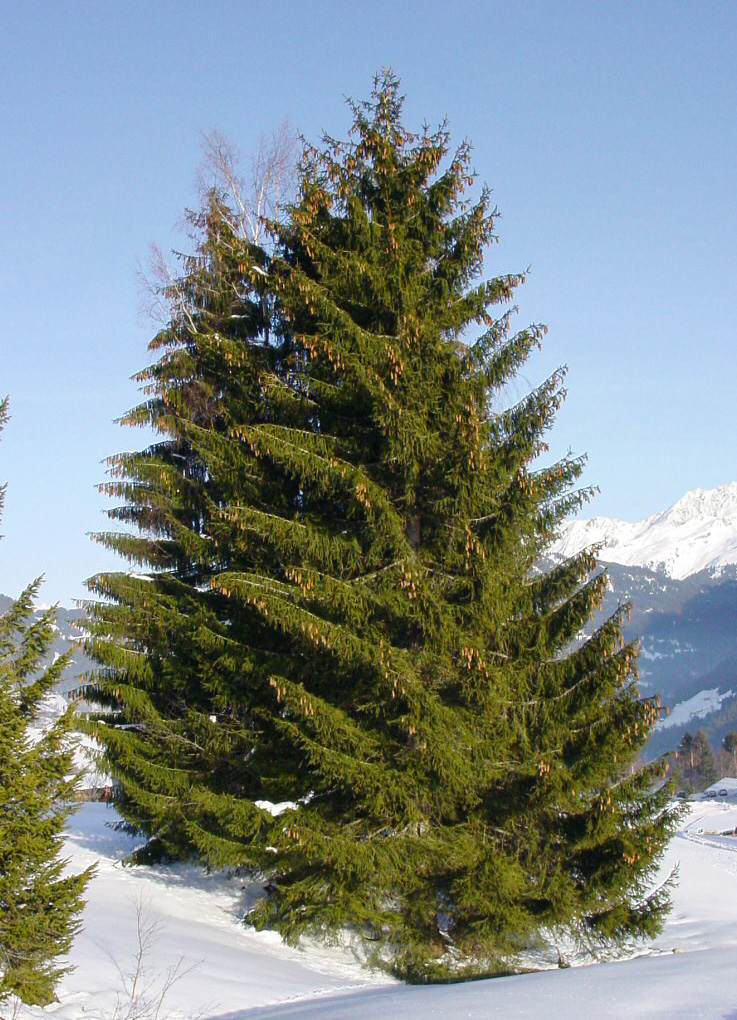
Picea abies

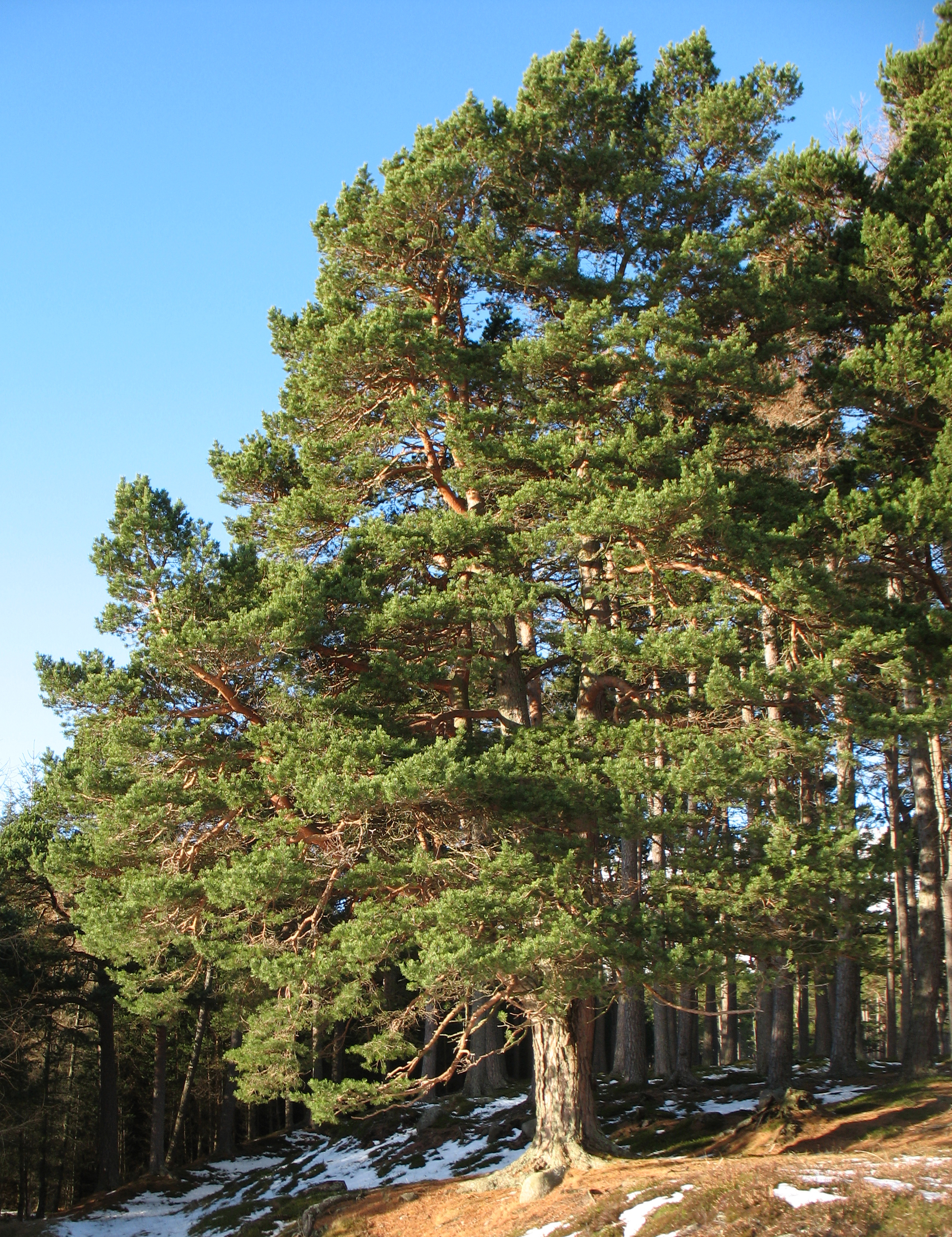
Pinus sylvestris

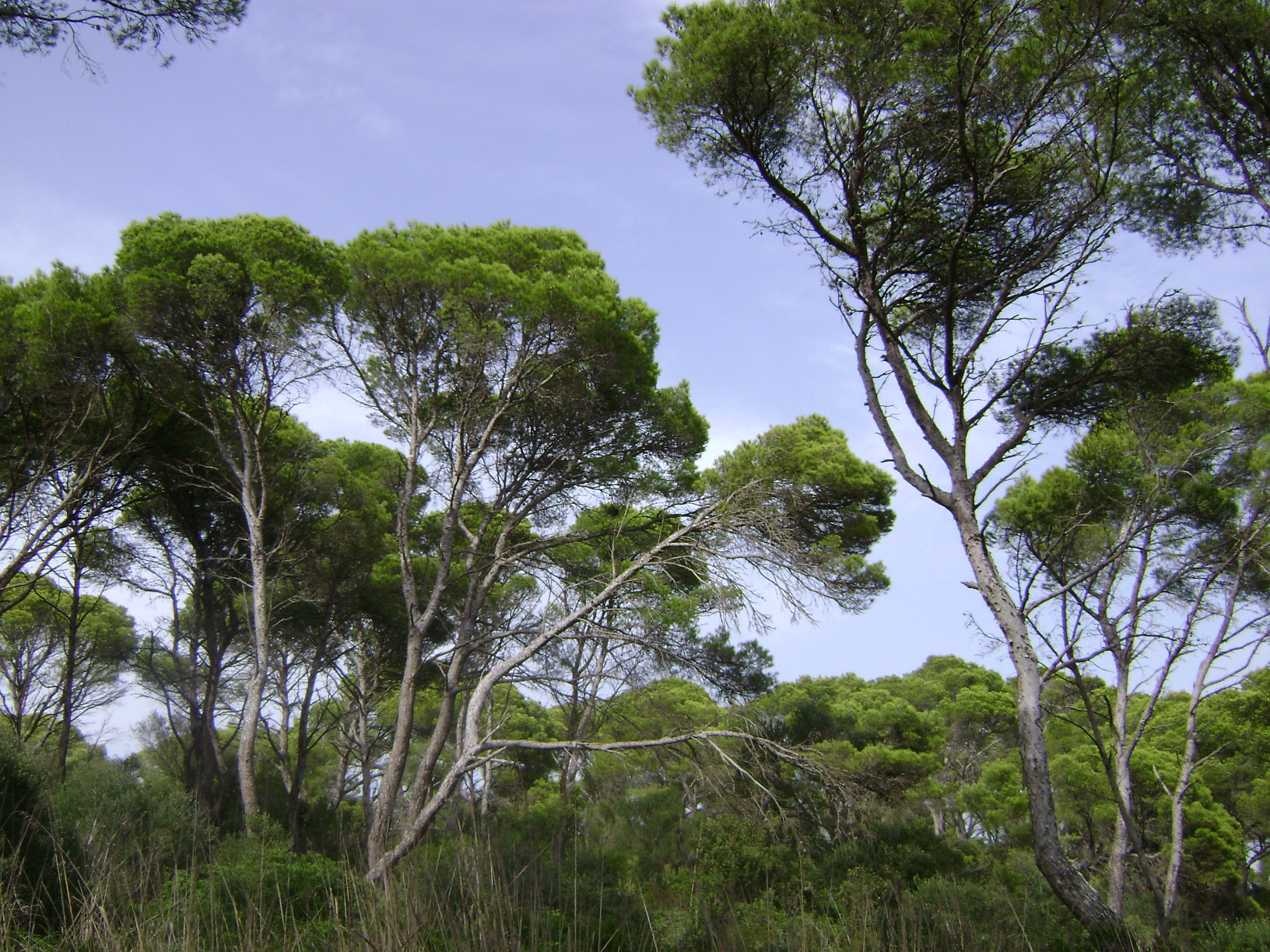
Pinus halepensis

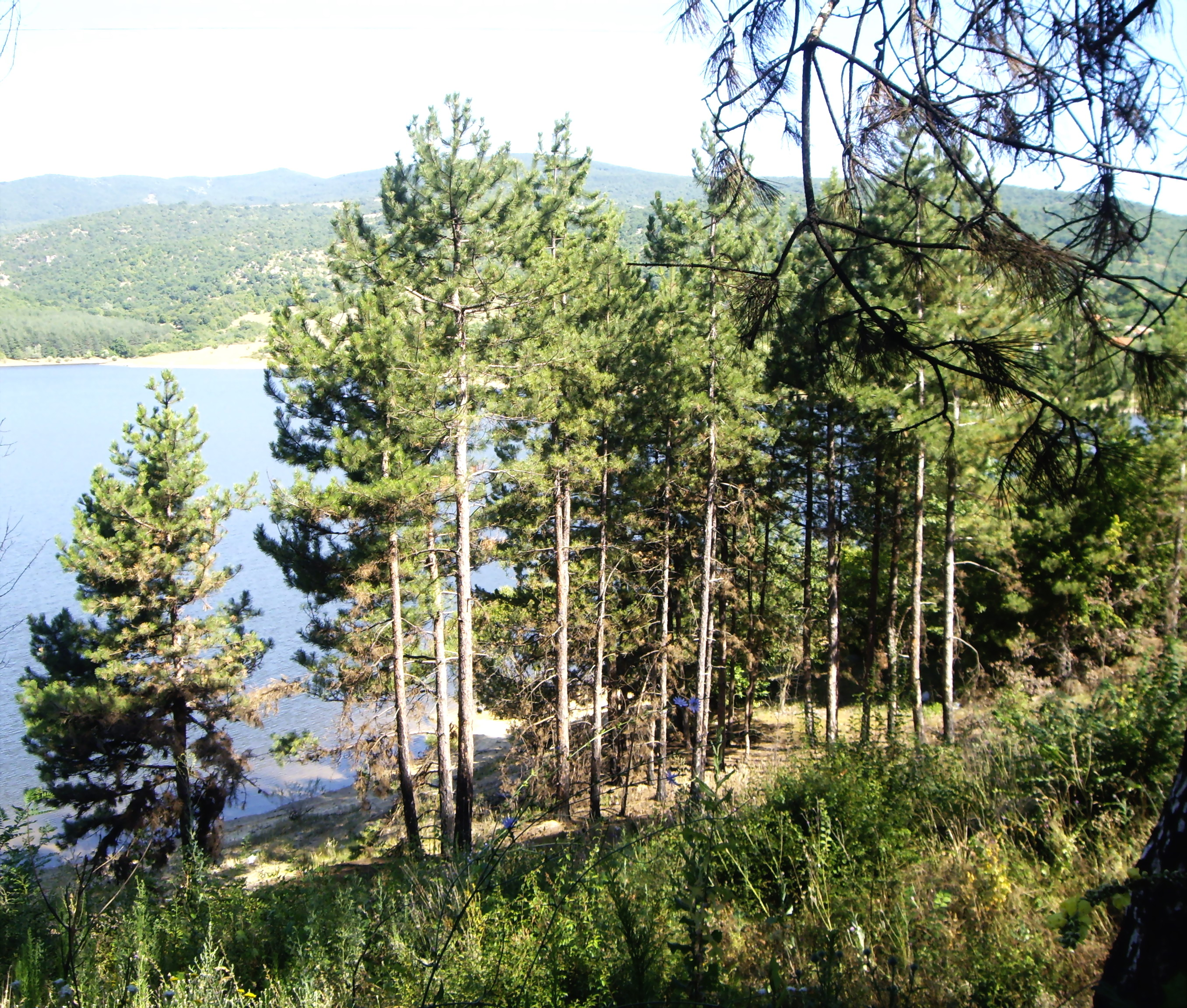
Pinus nigra

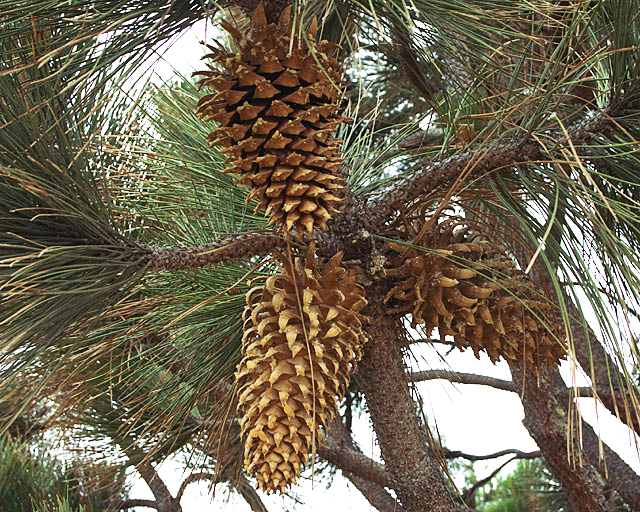
Coulter pine

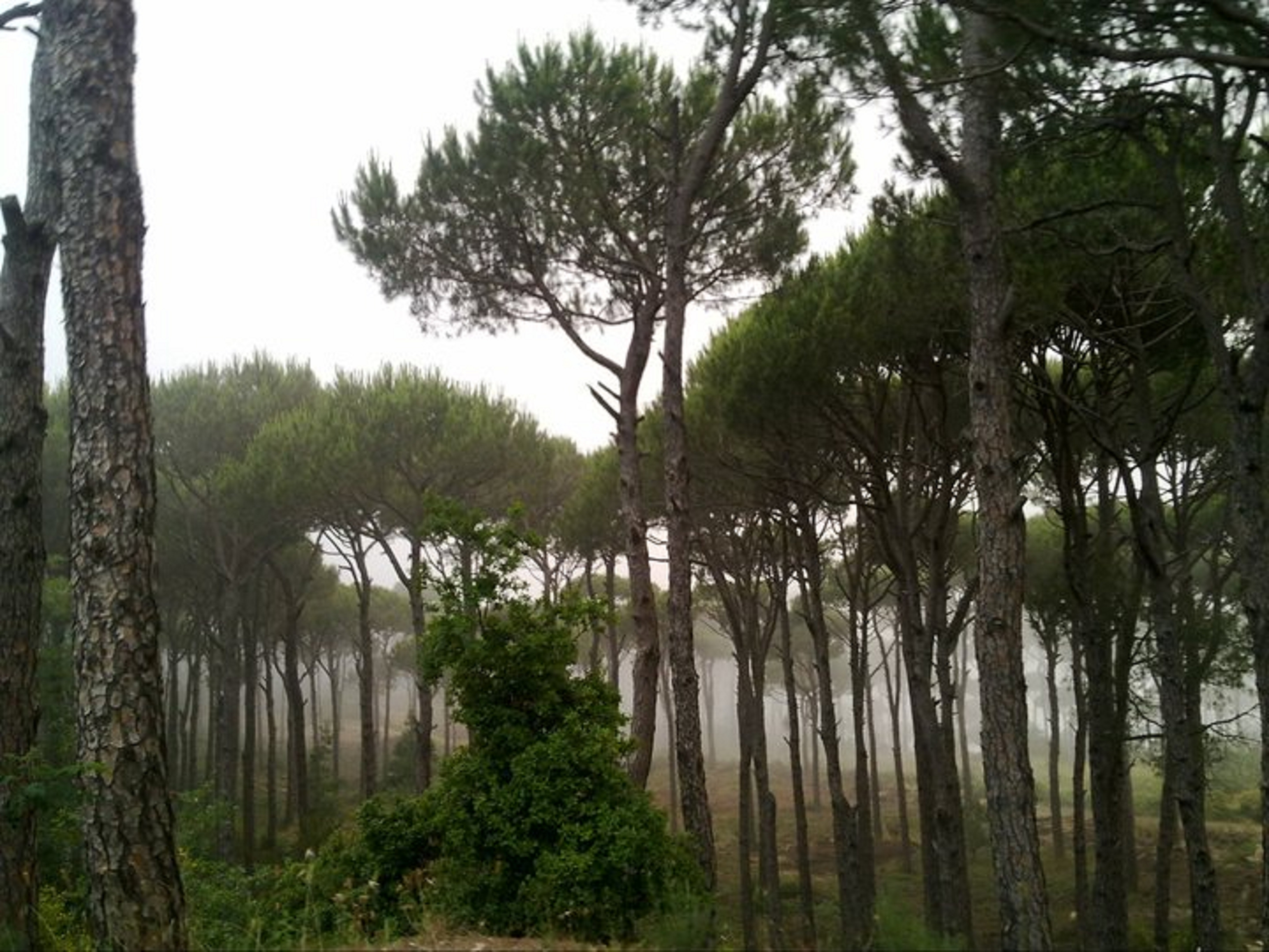
Stone pine

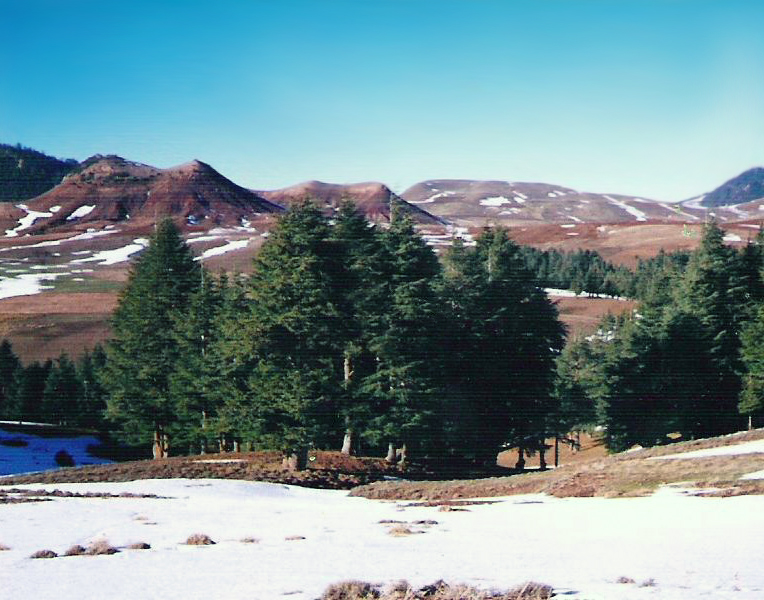
Cedrus atlantica

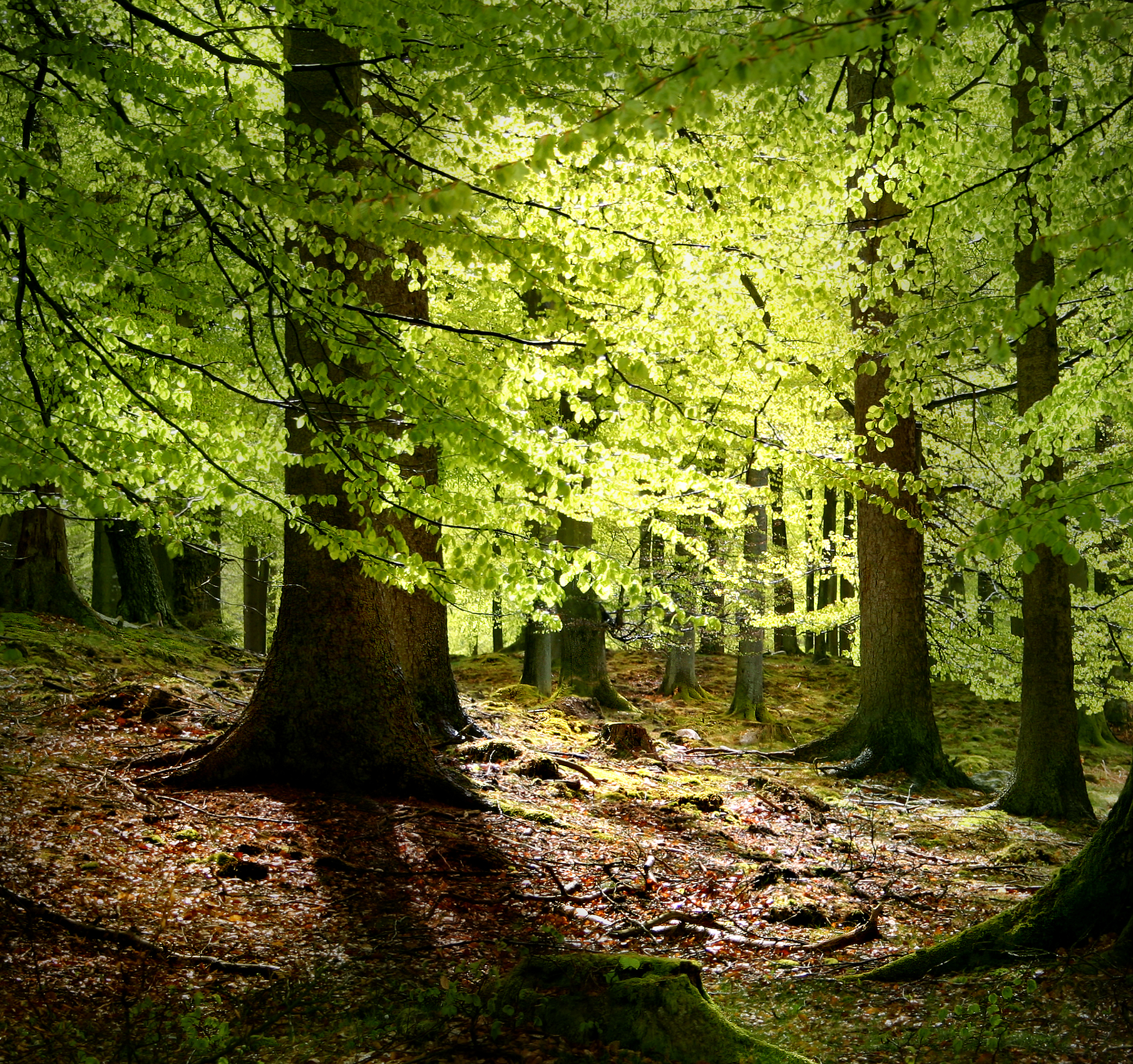
Fagus sylvatica

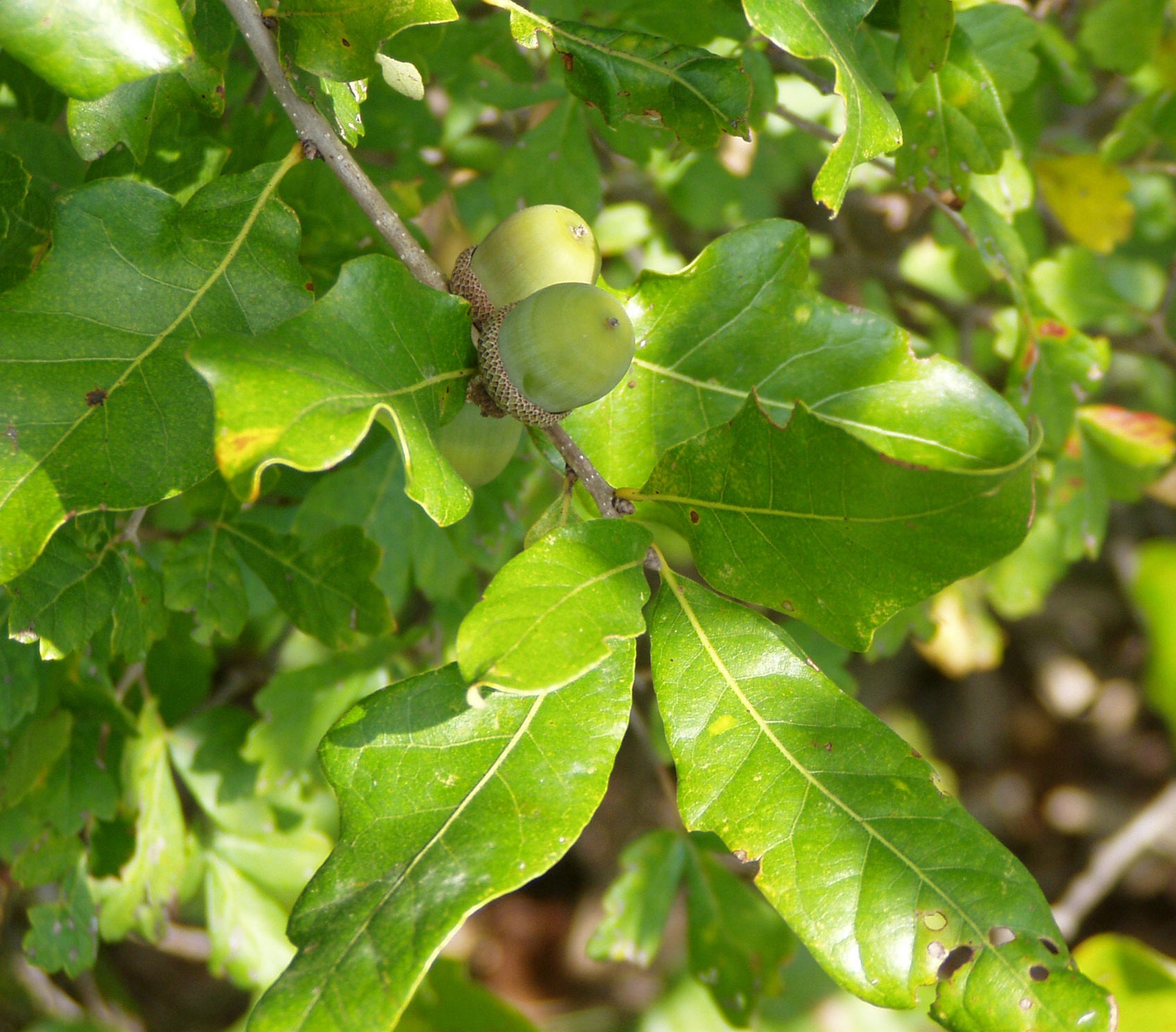
Quercus afares.

=== Barbarian macaque ===
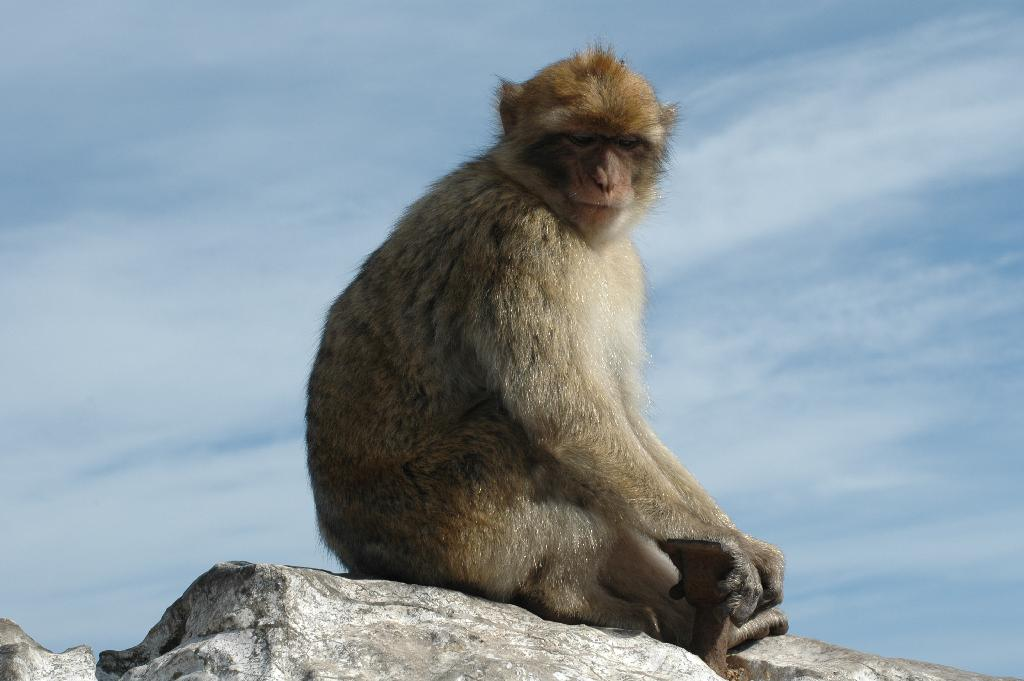
Barbary macaque

The Barbary macaque is found near Isaak Mountain, and sometimes ventures out into roads and populated areas to ask for food.

The Algerian government has taken several measures to protect this endangered animal. For example, signs are posted in places where the animals are found to prevent people from feeding the monkeys, as some of the foods people give the monkeys can lead to their death. Also preventing them from owning them for breeding purposes.

The Algerian government has also initiated the creation of several nature reserves where large numbers of the species are found, such as the Taza National Park and the Goraya National Park overlooking the Bay of Bejaia, as well as the Djurdjura National Park.

=== Animals ===
Many species of mammals live in the Babor Mountains within the forests of the Isaak forest and as well other forests.

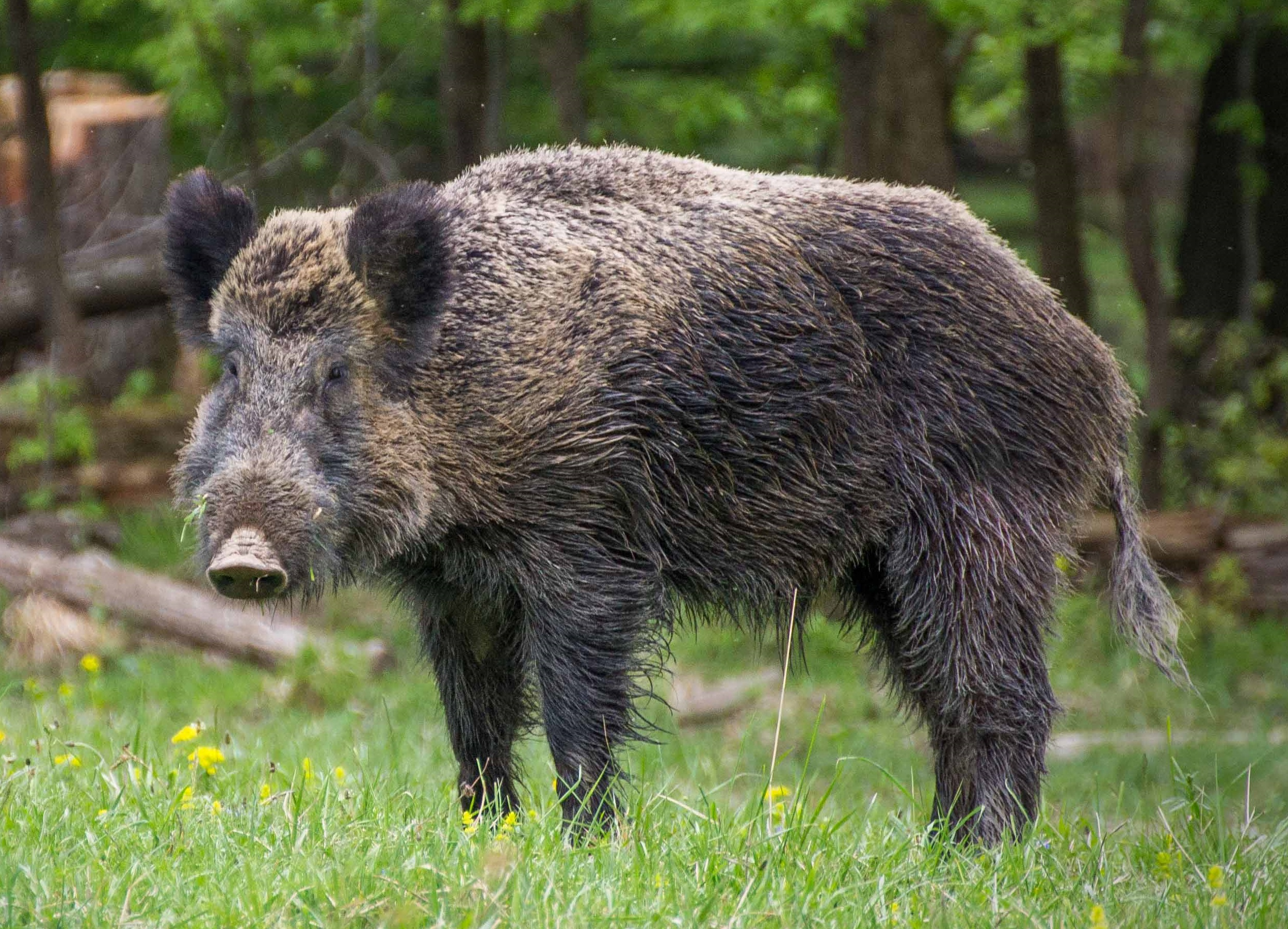
Wild boar

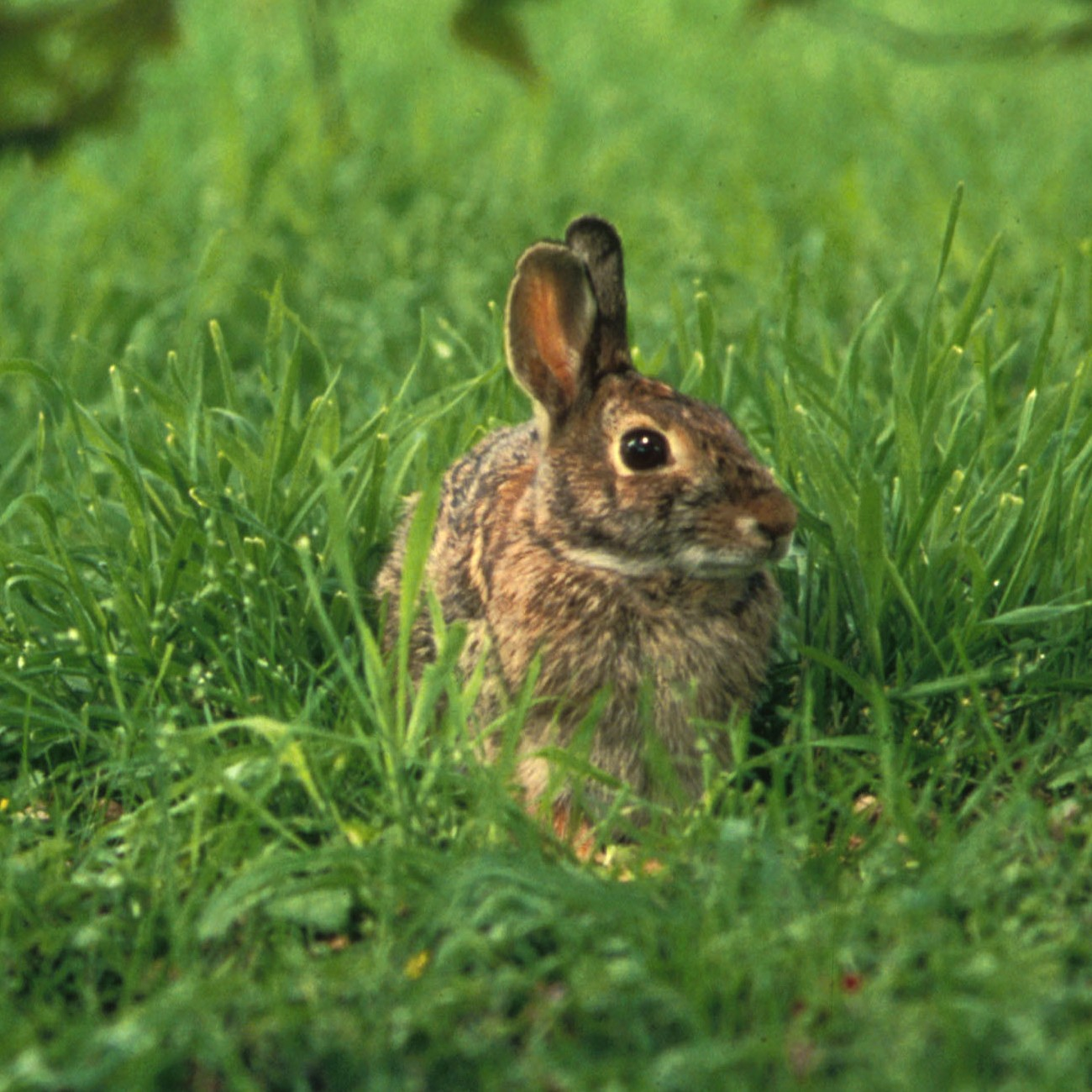
Rabbit

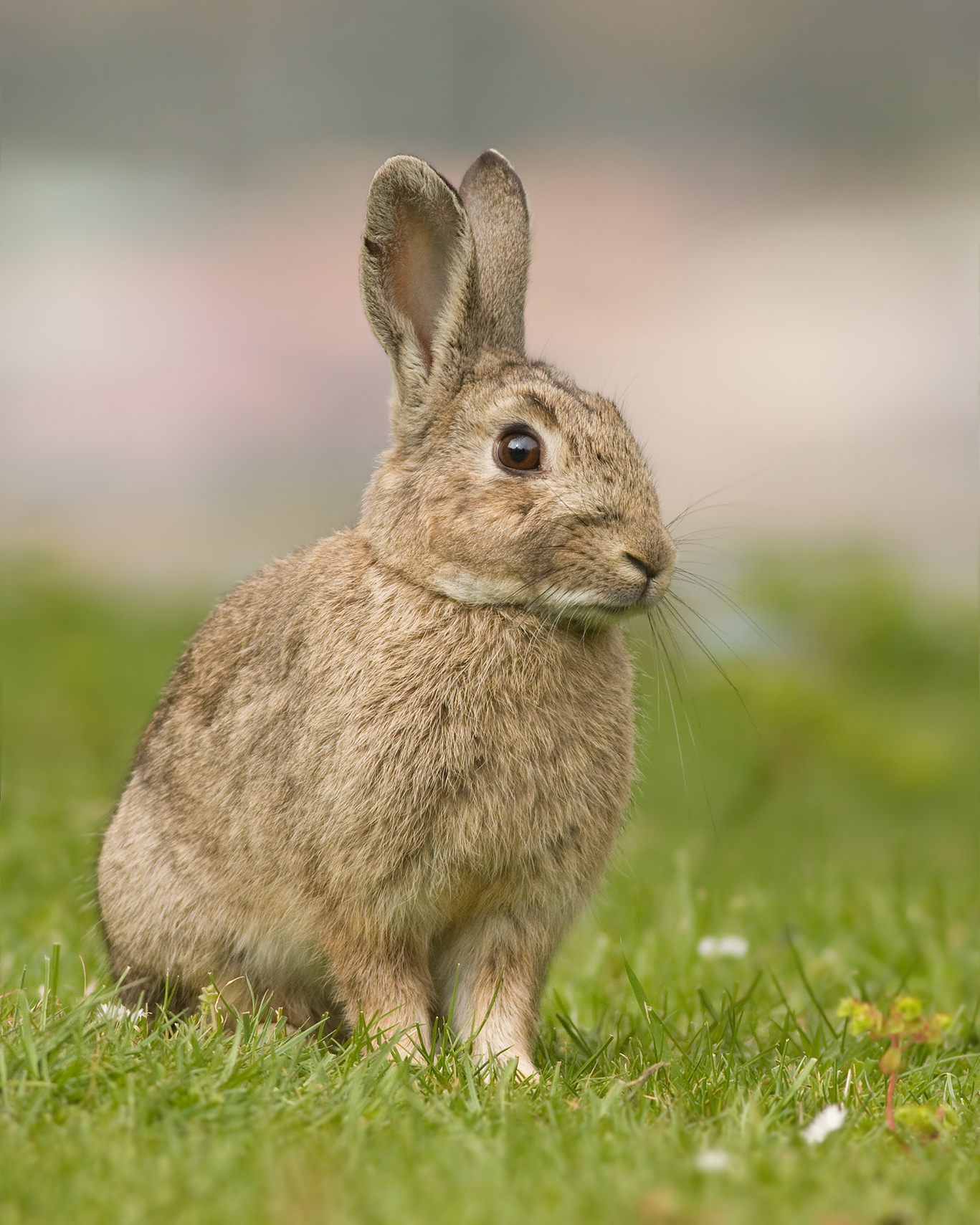
European rabbit

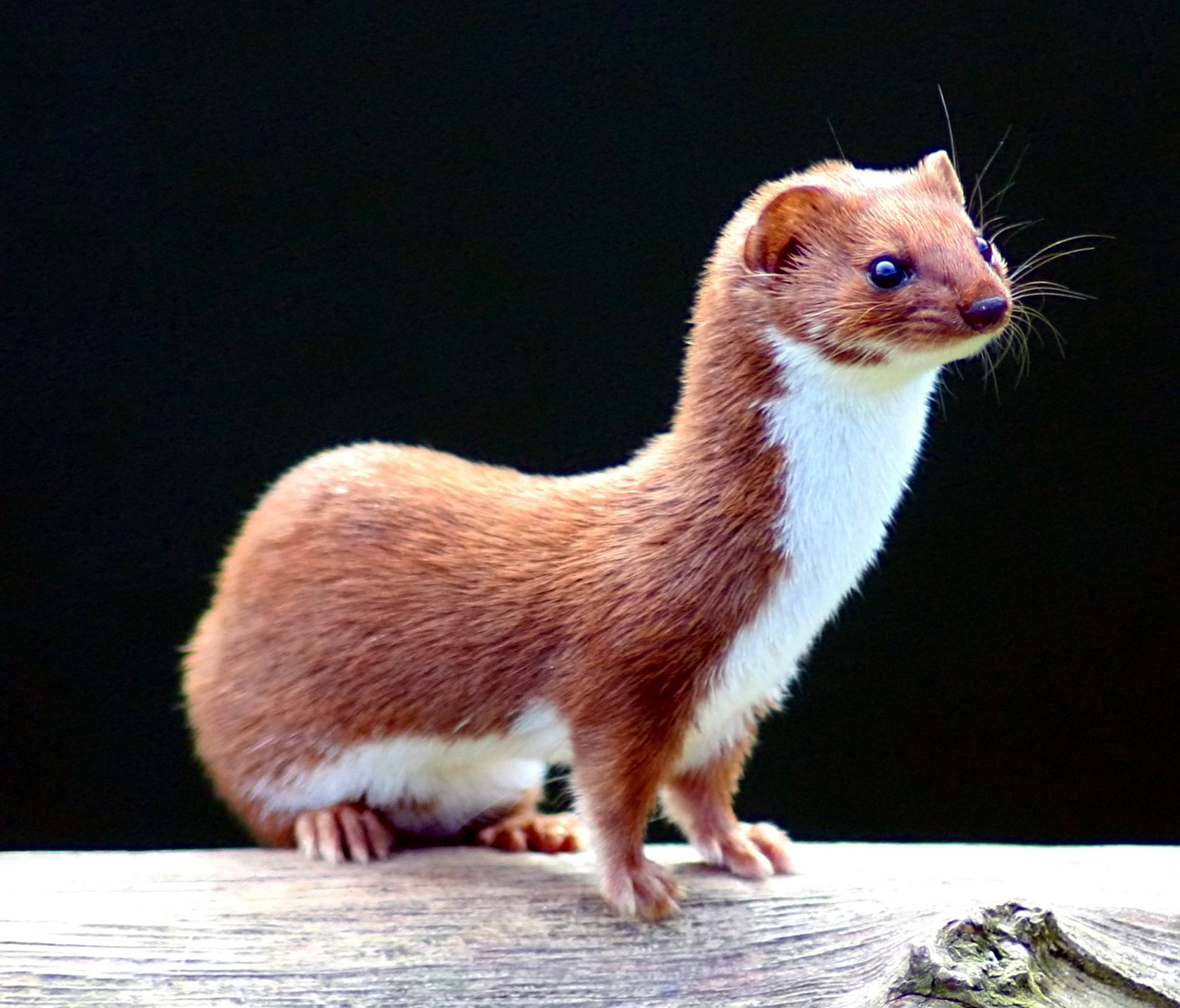
Least weasel

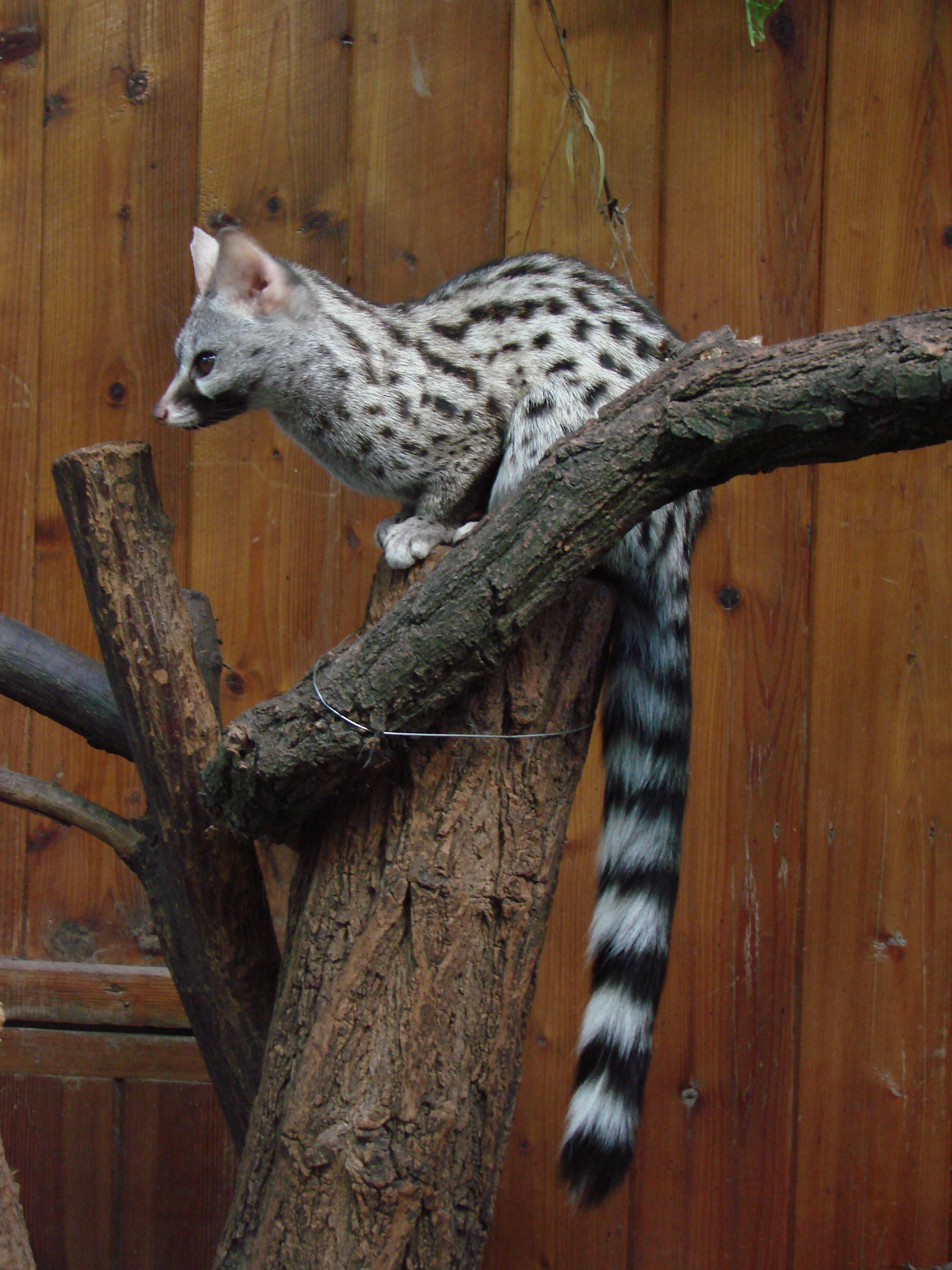
Common genet

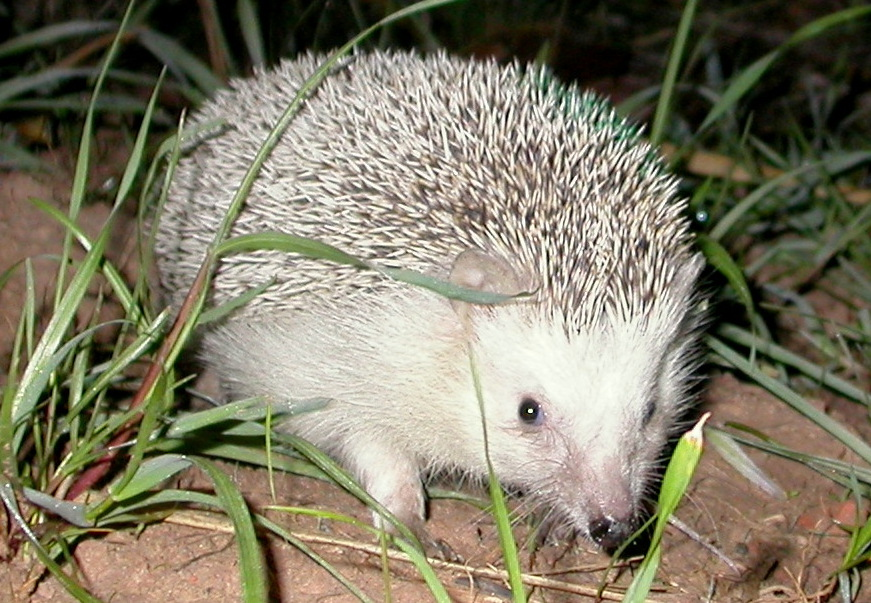
North African hedgehog

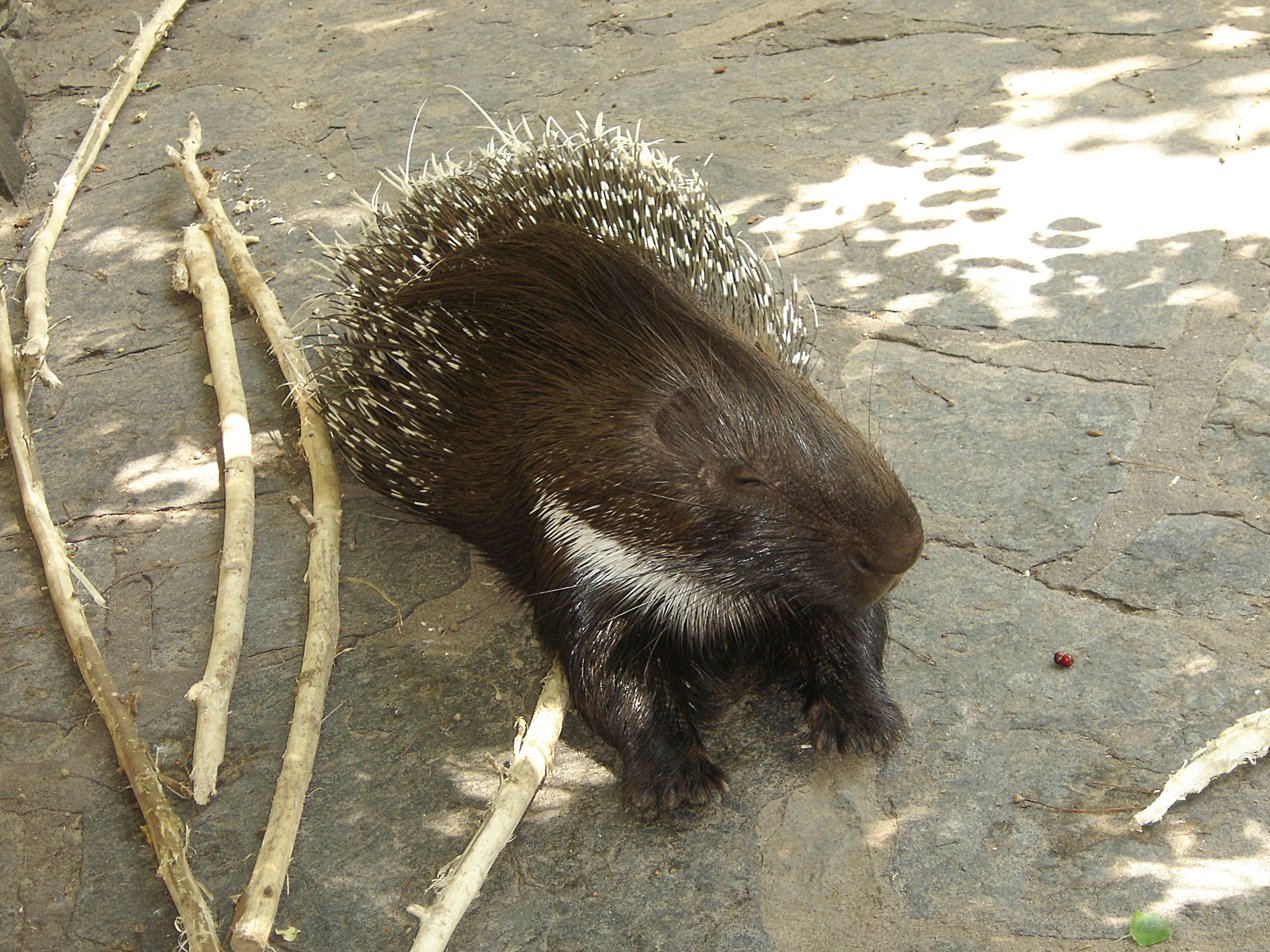
Porcupine

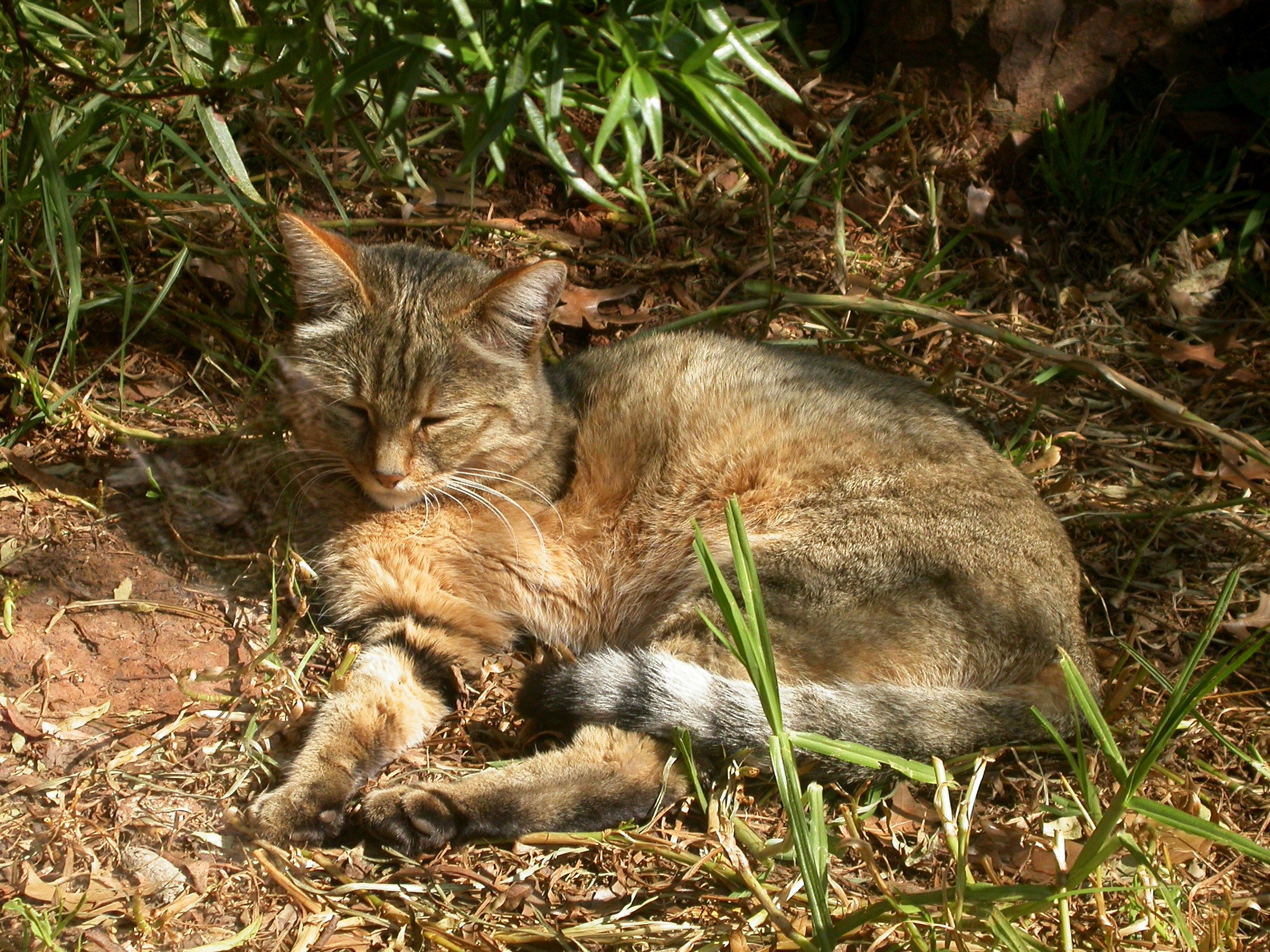
Wildcat

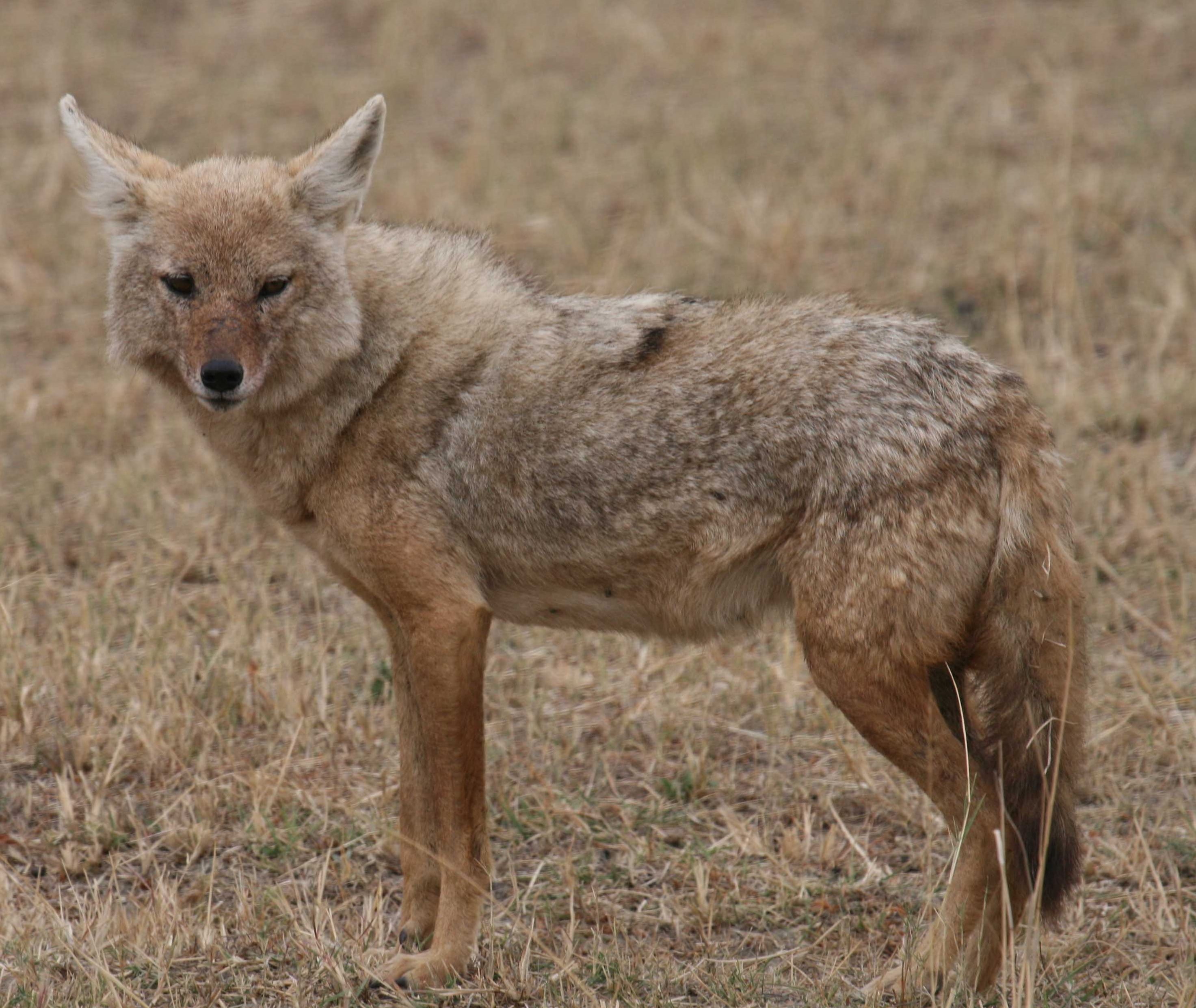
African wolf

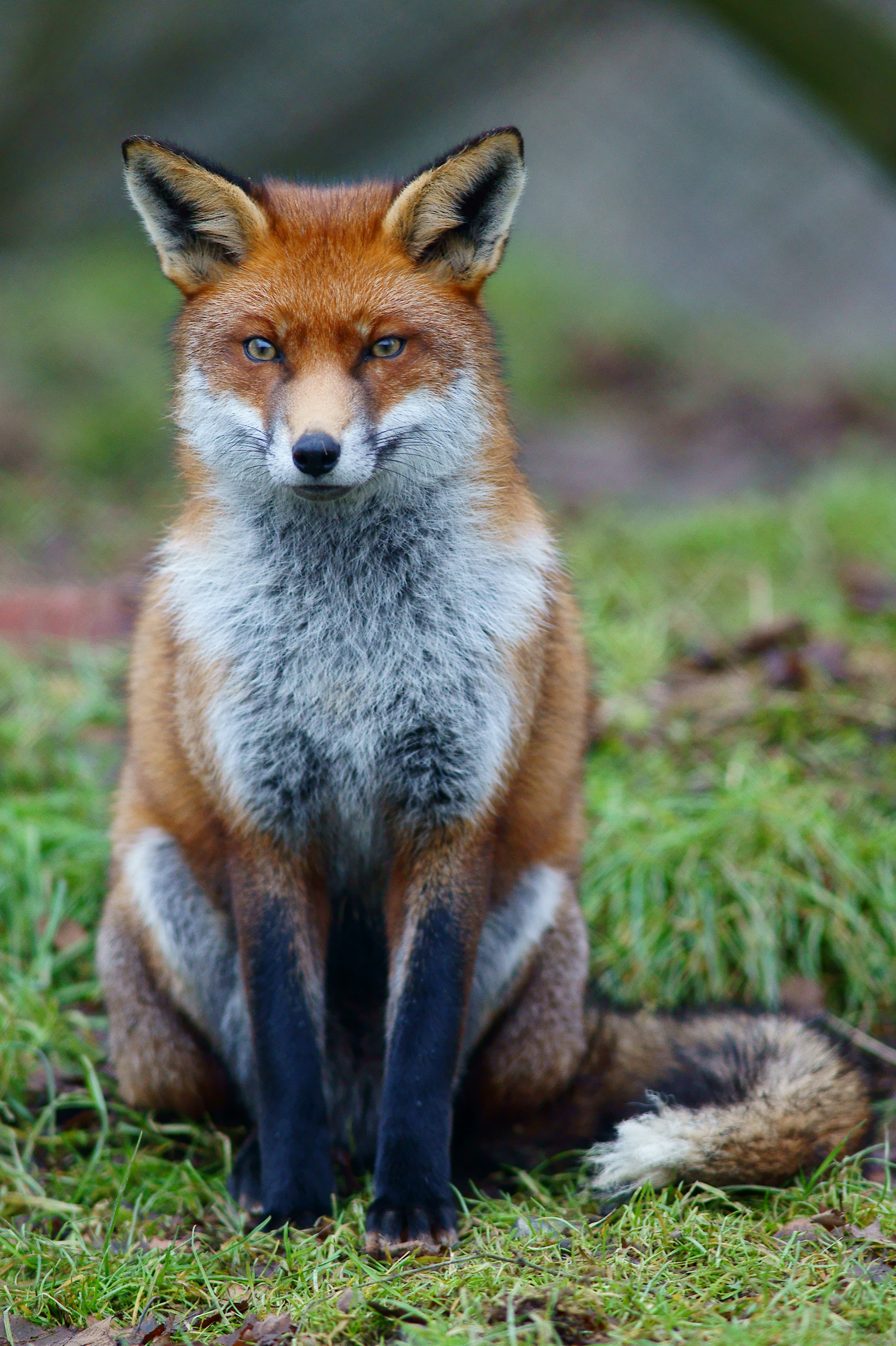
Red fox

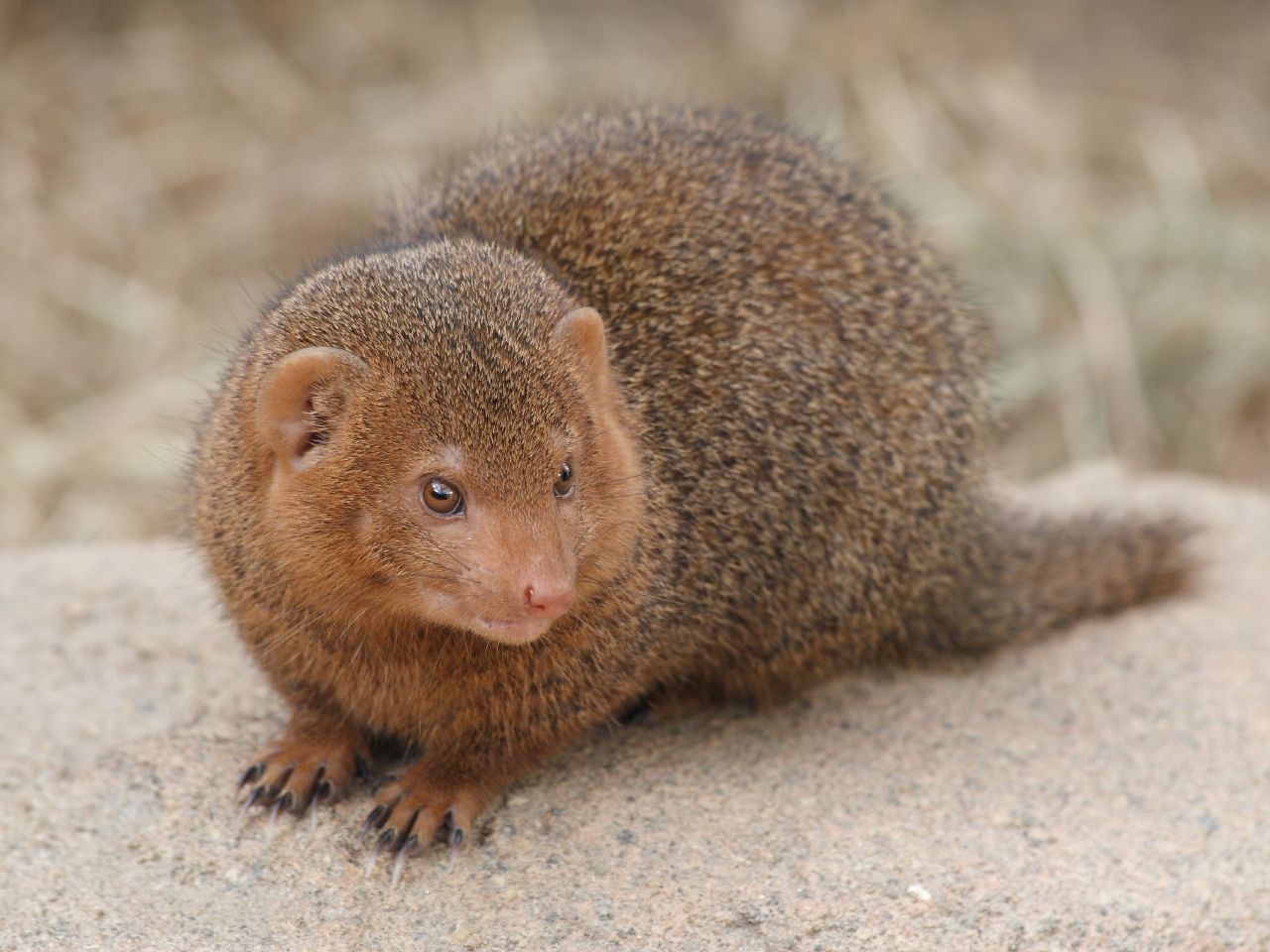
Mongoose

== Archaeological sites ==
In the peaks and the foothills of Isaak Mountain is a collection of monuments that date back to the Roman civilization.

It also has some ancient cave entrances to mines dating back to the same Roman period.

== Photo gallery ==
Location of mountain Bouzgeza

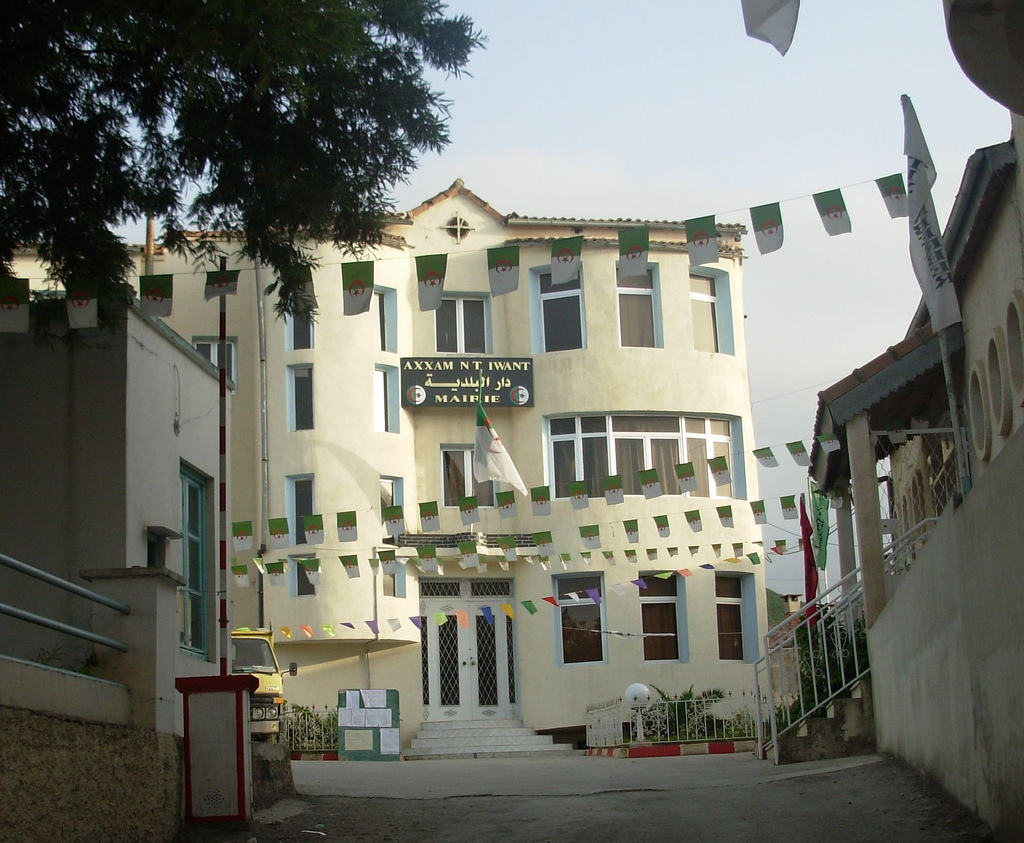
Tizi N'Berber Municipality Headquarters

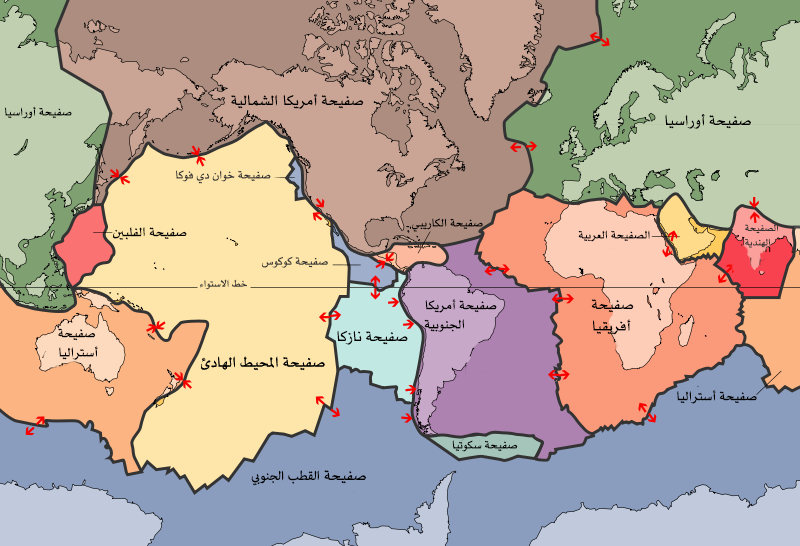
Plate tectonics

== See also ==
- Tell Atlas
- Khachna mountains
- Kabylia
- East–West Highway (Algeria)
- Aokas District
- Tizi N'Berber
- Béjaïa Province
