= Corniche (disambiguation) =

A corniche is a type of a road running by a mountain side or by a headland.

Corniche (or The Corniche) may refer to the following places:

- Corniche (Abu Dhabi) in the UAE
- Corniche (Alexandria) in Alexandria, Egypt
- Corniche Beirut in Beirut
- Corniche des Crêtes in Southern France
- Dammam Corniche in Dammam
- Doha Corniche in Doha
- Dubai Corniche in Dubai, UAE
- Jeddah Corniche in Jeddah, Saudi Arabia
- Corniche Jjilienne in Algeria
- Corniche Kennedy in Marseille, France
- Corniche d'Or in Southern France
- Shanghai Corniche in Shanghai, China
- Sharjah Corniche in Sharjah, UAE
- The Three Corniches on the Côte d'Azur, France:
  - Corniche Infèrieure (or Basse Corniche)
  - Moyenne Corniche
  - Grande Corniche
- Marine Drive, Mumbai, in Mumbai (Bombay), India

It may also refer to:

- Rolls-Royce Corniche, a series of automobiles made by Rolls-Royce from 1971 to 2002

In sports:

- Corniche (horse), an American thoroughbred racehorse

== See also ==
- Cornice
