= Taza National Park =

Algerian national park

- IUCN category II (national park)
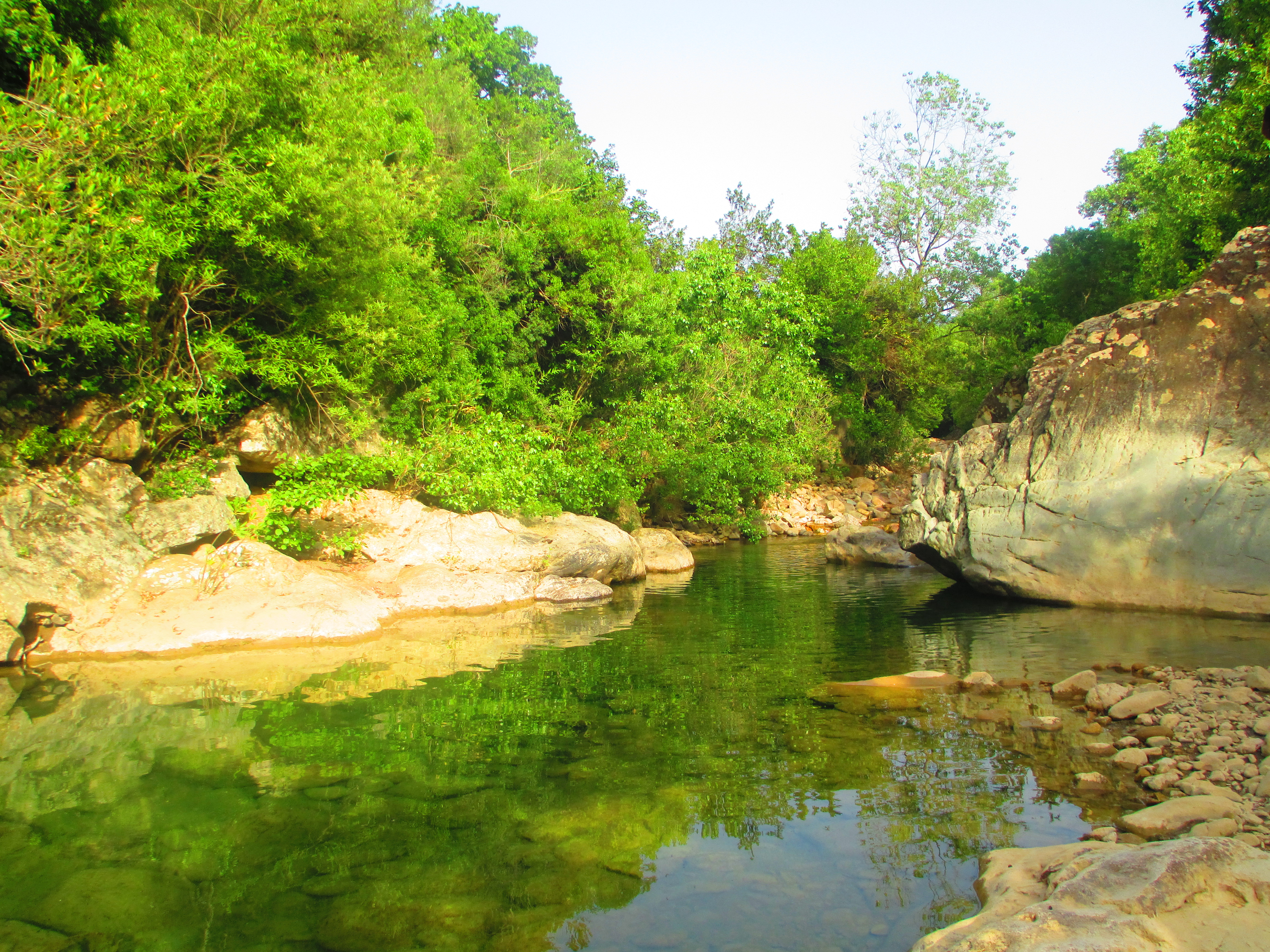

- Location within Algeria
- Interactive map of Taza National Park
- Location: Jijel Province, Algeria
- Nearest city: Taza, Algeria
- Coordinates: 36°36′N 5°30′E
- Area: 38.07 km^{2} (14.70 sq mi)
- Established: 1923
- Website: http://www.pntaza.dz

The Taza National Park (Arabic:الحظيرة الوطنية تازة) is one of the smaller national parks of Algeria. It is located in Jijel Province in the mountainous region of the Tell Atlas, and is named after the nearby city of Taza. Its total area is 3,807 hectares (9,410 acres) and it includes parts of the forested area of the Guerrouch massif. The lower parts of the park seldom experience frost and are relatively warm and dry, while the peaks may have a covering of snow in winter. The annual precipitation in the park ranges from 1,000 to 1,400 millimetres (39 to 55 in) and the annual mean temperature is around 18 °C (64 °F).

== The park ==
Taza National Park was established in 1923 by the French colonial administrators in Algeria. Its aim was to protect the coastline and towering forested heights and provide protection for the Barbary macaque. The park adjoins the Mediterranean Sea, and includes cliffs that rise from sea level to over 1,100 m (3,600 ft). The largest forest in Algeria of cork oaks (Quercus suber) and gall oaks (Quercus faginea) is found here. The park is located 30 kilometres north-east of Jijel. The park includes the caves of Jijel, in addition to sand beaches and many cliffs and grottoes. It is a UNESCO-recognized biosphere reserve with a varied flora and fauna.

== Biosphere reserve ==
The Taza Biosphere Reserve comprises the whole of Taza National Park. It aims to combine conservation of the environment with the sustainable use of natural resources, allowing the local economy to flourish. Some of the habitats, plants and wildlife are important or unique in North Africa and internationally. About 5,600 people, mostly of Berber origin, live inside the reserve.They largely sustain themselves on small agricultural holdings, cultivating vegetables, fodder crops and tree fruits. Tourism is also important to the local economy. Management of the reserve includes eco-development projects, with beehives and fruit tree seeds being distributed to villagers, and forest tracks and electricity supplies being improved for remote communities.

== Flora and fauna ==
At lower altitudes, the Guerrouch forest is dominated by cork oaks, but higher up Algerian chestnut-leaved oak (Quercus afares) and Algerian oak (Quercus canariensis) are also present and there is a understorey of bird cherry (Prunus avium), Mediterranean willow (Salix pedicellata), European alder (Alnus glutinosa), Montpellier maple (Acer monspessulanum) and narrow-leaved ash (Fraxinus angustifolia).

The barbary ape is an endangered primate with a narrowly restricted present distribution and is present in the park. The endangered Algerian nuthatch is also present, with an estimated population of 364 individuals in a 1989 survey. The park is also known for its birds of prey.

Earlier, the Barbary lion's range had included this place.
