= Jijel Ferhat Abbas Airport =

Airport in Algeria

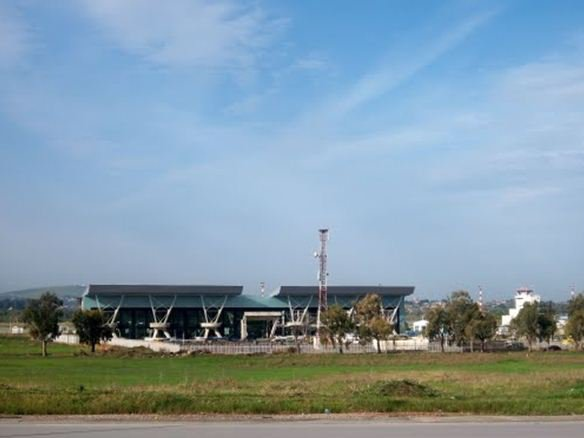
- IATA: GJL; ICAO: DAAV

Summary
- Airport type: Public
- Serves: Jijel
- Location: Taher, Algeria
- Elevation AMSL: 11 m (36 ft)
- Coordinates: 36°47′40″N 05°52′25″E

Map
- Location of airport in Algeria

Runways
Direction	Length		Surface
Direction	m	ft	Surface
17/35	2,400	7,874	Asphalt

Statistics (2020)
- Passenger volume: 16,379

Jijel Ferhat Abbas Airport (IATA: GJL, ICAO: DAAV), also known as Ferhat Abbas Airport, is an airport near Jijel, Algeria. Its name comes from the first president of Algerian National Assembly, Ferhat Abbas.

== Airlines and destinations ==
Airlines	Destinations
Air Algérie	Algiers, Marseille

== Accidents and incidents ==
On 5 August 2025, a civil protection surveillance aircraft crashed during a training mission at the airport, killing four people.
