= Jijel =

Jijel ⴵⵉⴵⴻⵍ, Ǧiǧel
- City
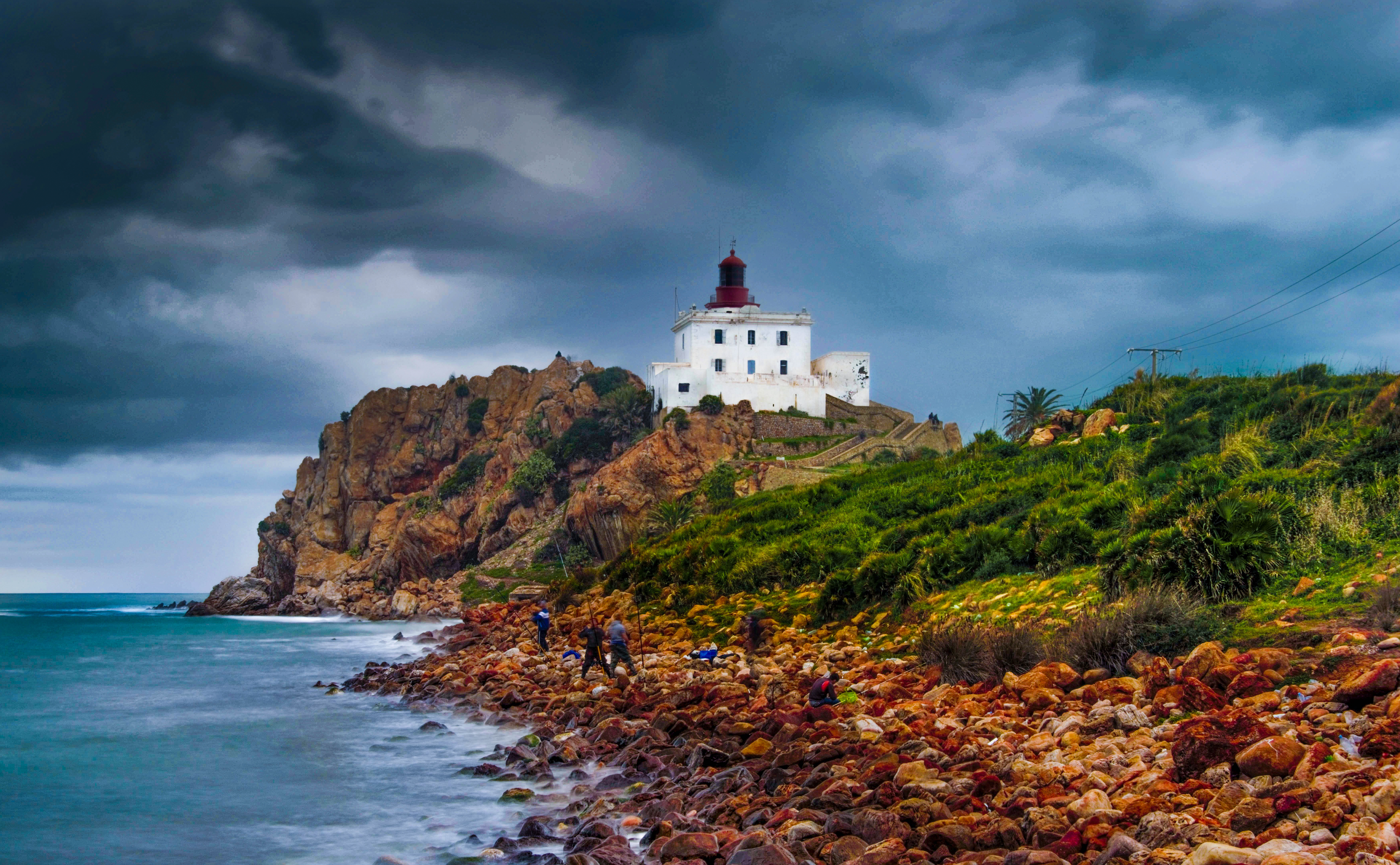
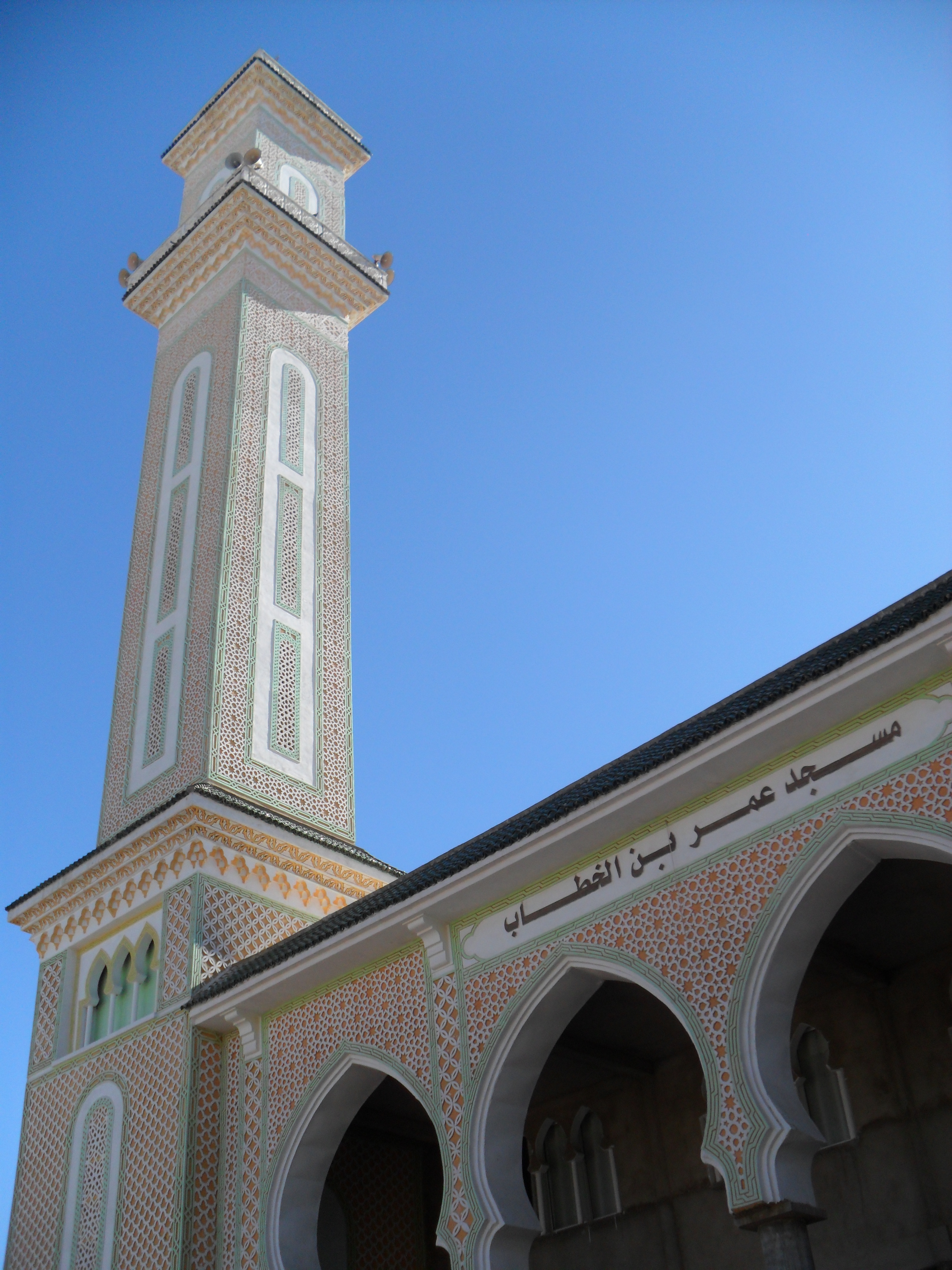
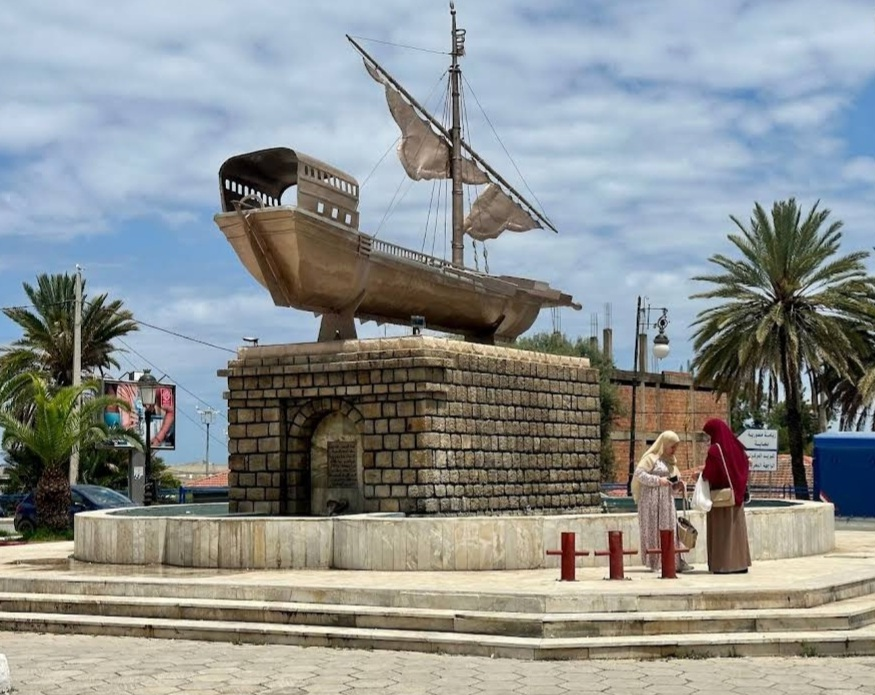
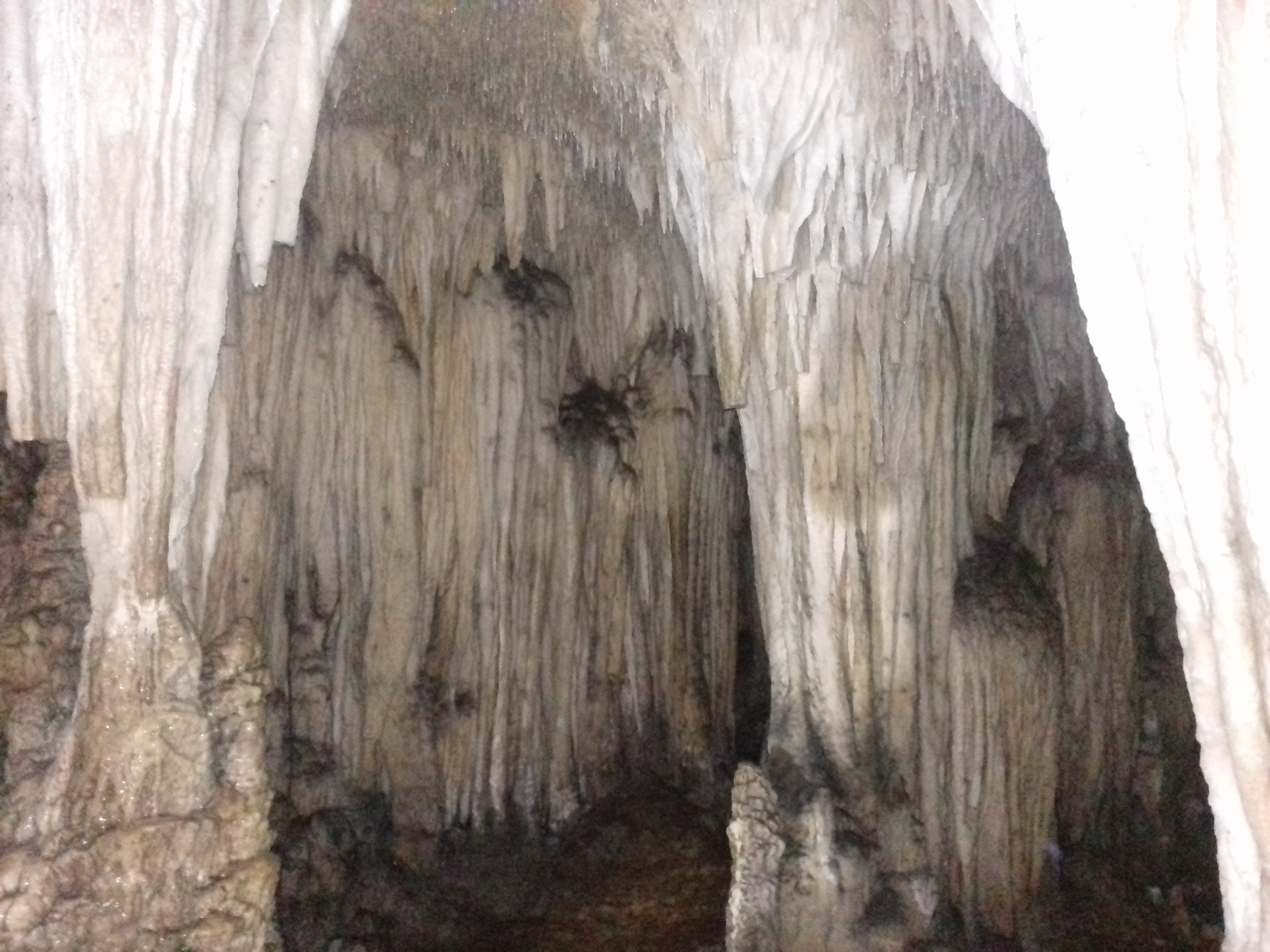
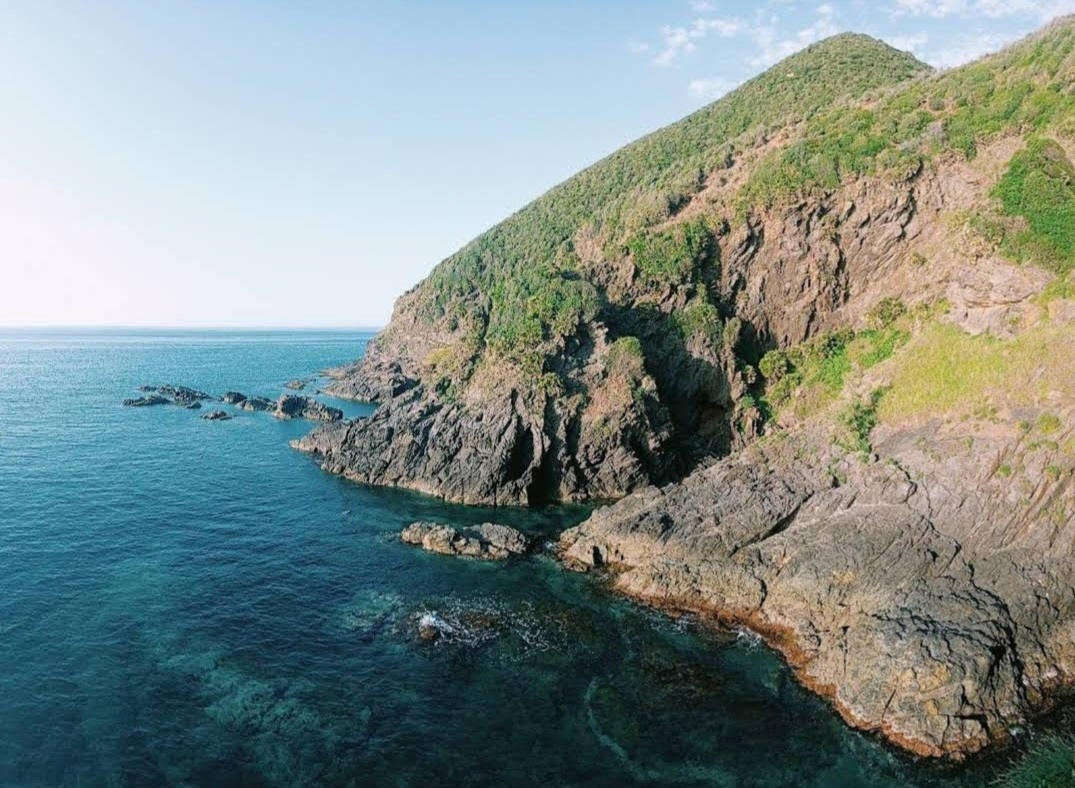
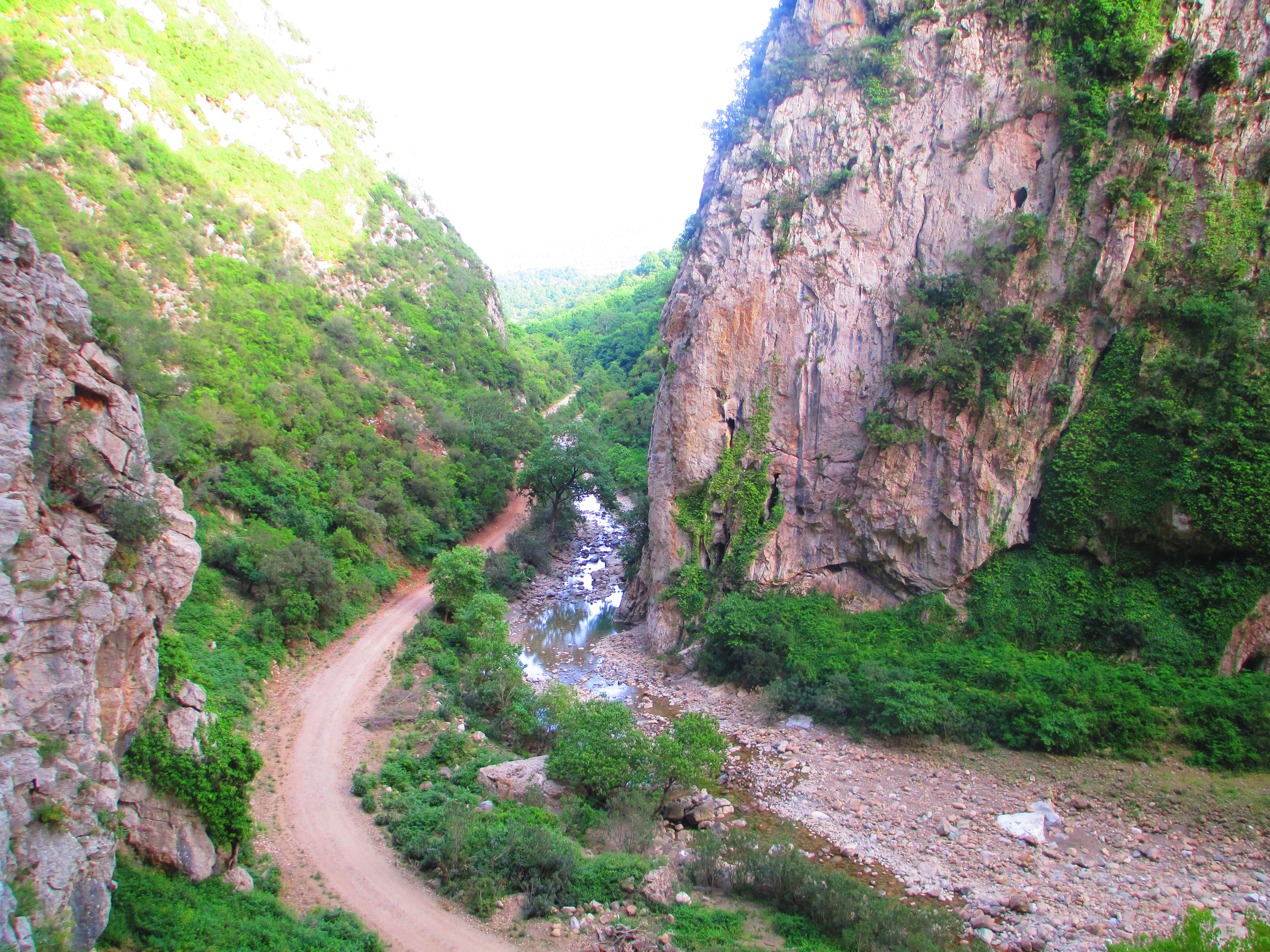
- Ras Afia Lighthouse Omar ibn al-Khattab Mosque Baba Aruj's Ship Monument Grottes Merveilleuses Beni Belaïd Nature Reserve Taza National Park Jijel
- Motto(s): "From the people, for the people"
- Location of Jijel in the Jijel Province

- Location of Jijel in Algeria
- Coordinates: 36°49′N 05°45′E
- Country: Algeria
- Province: Jijel Province
- District: Jijel District
- APC: 2012-2017

Government
  - Type: Municipality
  - Mayor: Yazid Abdellah

Area
  - Total: 62.38 km^{2} (24.09 sq mi)
- Elevation: 10 m (33 ft)

Population (2008 census)
  - Total: 131,513
  - Density: 2,108/km^{2} (5,460/sq mi)
- Time zone: UTC+1 (CET)
- Postal code: 18000
- ISO 3166 code: CP
- Website: www.jijel-dz.org
- Ras Afia lighthouse
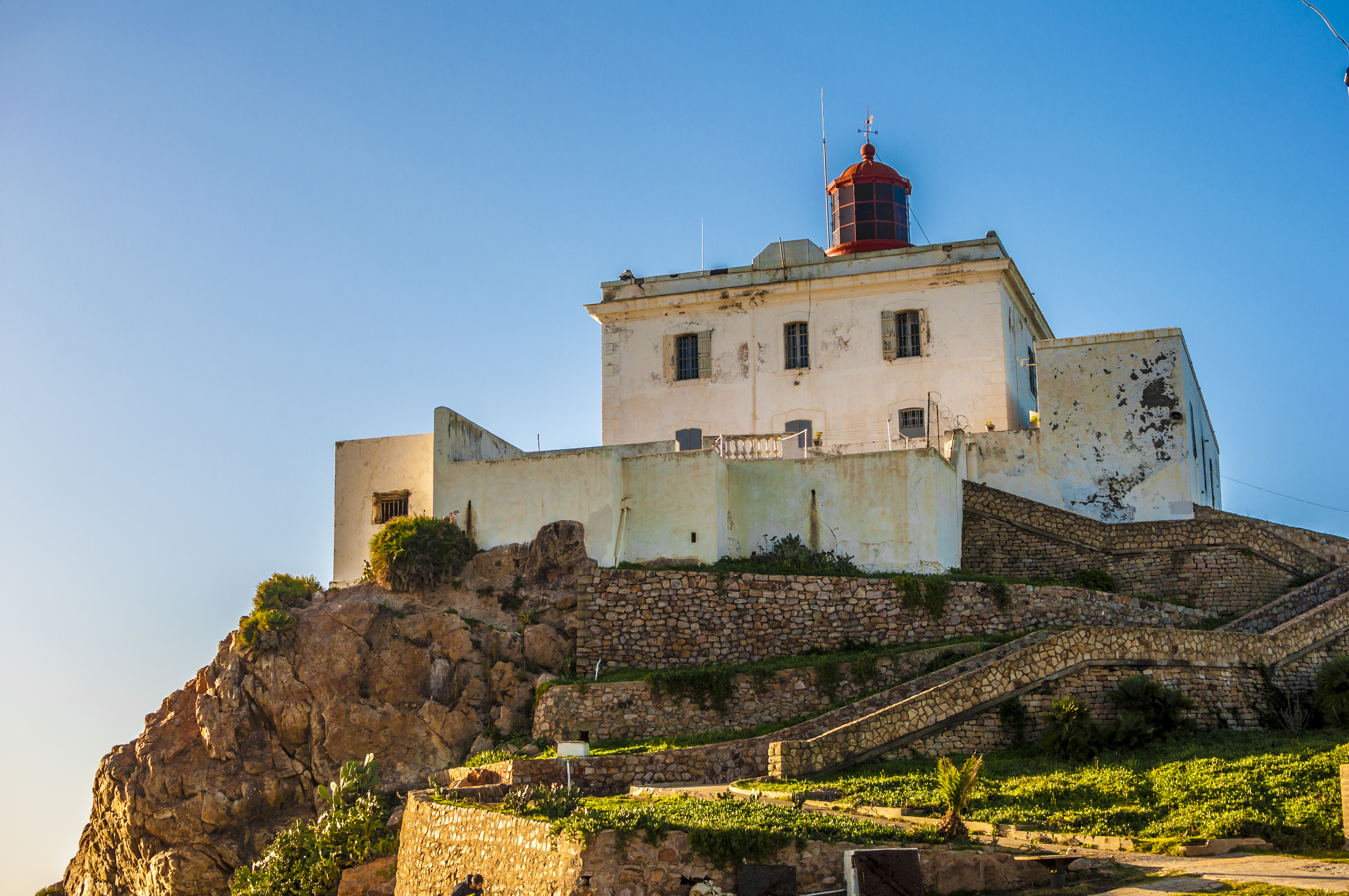
- Constructed: 1907
- Foundation: stone base
- Construction: masonry tower
- Height: 16.8 metres (55 ft)
- Shape: octagonal tower with balcony and lantern attached to the front 2-storey keeper’s house
- Markings: white tower, red lantern
- Operator: Office Nationale de Signalisation Maritime
- Focal height: 45.2 metres (148 ft)
- Lens: first order Fresnel lens
- Light source: main power
- Intensity: 1,000 W
- Range: 21 nautical miles (39 km; 24 mi)
- Characteristic: Fl R 5s.

Jijel (Kabyle: Ǧiǧel, Arabic: جِيْجَل), the classical Igilgili, is the capital of Jijel Province in north-eastern Algeria. It is flanked by the Mediterranean Sea in the region of Corniche Jijelienne and had a population of 131,513 in 2008.

Jijel is the administrative and trade center for a region specialising in cork processing, leather tanning and steelmaking. Local crops include citrus and grain. Fishing is also of great importance. Tourists (mainly Algerians) are attracted to Jijel for its landscapes and fine sand beaches. Being a resort town, there are many hotels and restaurants. There are Phoenician tombs nearby.

== Geography ==
Jijel is situated 30 km from Taza National Park; this national park and other vicinity features support a variety of flora and fauna. It is an important habitat for the endangered Barbary macaque, Macaca sylvanus.

=== Climate ===
Jijel has a hot-summer Mediterranean climate (Csa in the Köppen climate classification).

Climate data for Jijel (Jijel Ferhat Abbas Airport) 1991–2020
| Month | Jan | Feb | Mar | Apr | May | Jun | Jul | Aug | Sep | Oct | Nov | Dec | Year |
|---|---|---|---|---|---|---|---|---|---|---|---|---|---|
| Record high °C (°F) | 26.5 (79.7) | 28.5 (83.3) | 36.0 (96.8) | 34.3 (93.7) | 39.7 (103.5) | 42.8 (109.0) | 46.7 (116.1) | 44.8 (112.6) | 43.6 (110.5) | 40.0 (104.0) | 32.7 (90.9) | 28.0 (82.4) | 46.7 (116.1) |
| Mean daily maximum °C (°F) | 16.4 (61.5) | 16.5 (61.7) | 18.6 (65.5) | 20.5 (68.9) | 23.6 (74.5) | 27.7 (81.9) | 30.6 (87.1) | 31.5 (88.7) | 28.7 (83.7) | 25.6 (78.1) | 20.7 (69.3) | 17.7 (63.9) | 23.2 (73.8) |
| Daily mean °C (°F) | 11.7 (53.1) | 11.7 (53.1) | 13.5 (56.3) | 15.5 (59.9) | 18.6 (65.5) | 22.3 (72.1) | 25.2 (77.4) | 26.2 (79.2) | 23.7 (74.7) | 20.5 (68.9) | 16.0 (60.8) | 13.0 (55.4) | 18.2 (64.8) |
| Mean daily minimum °C (°F) | 6.9 (44.4) | 6.8 (44.2) | 8.5 (47.3) | 10.4 (50.7) | 13.5 (56.3) | 17.0 (62.6) | 19.8 (67.6) | 20.8 (69.4) | 18.8 (65.8) | 15.5 (59.9) | 11.2 (52.2) | 8.2 (46.8) | 13.1 (55.6) |
| Record low °C (°F) | −0.1 (31.8) | −0.1 (31.8) | 1.5 (34.7) | 3.2 (37.8) | 3.8 (38.8) | 9.0 (48.2) | 13.0 (55.4) | 14.5 (58.1) | 11.1 (52.0) | 8.3 (46.9) | 3.5 (38.3) | 1.7 (35.1) | −0.1 (31.8) |
| Average precipitation mm (inches) | 136.4 (5.37) | 120.9 (4.76) | 96.4 (3.80) | 77.3 (3.04) | 49.6 (1.95) | 14.2 (0.56) | 2.5 (0.10) | 13.8 (0.54) | 64.7 (2.55) | 106.4 (4.19) | 156.7 (6.17) | 172.0 (6.77) | 1,010.9 (39.80) |
| Average precipitation days (≥ 1.0 mm) | 11.3 | 10.6 | 8.3 | 8.1 | 5.1 | 2.4 | 0.6 | 2.2 | 6.5 | 7.8 | 11.3 | 11.6 | 85.8 |
| Mean monthly sunshine hours | 156.4 | 169.0 | 210.0 | 232.2 | 274.6 | 312.1 | 346.4 | 329.4 | 243.4 | 214.8 | 155.9 | 147.1 | 2,791.3 |
Source: NOAA

== History ==
Originally Phoenician, Igilgili passed to the Carthaginians, the Roman Republic and Empire, the Vandals, the Byzantines, the Umayyads, the Genovese, and the Ottomans. It was conquered for the last time in the 16th century by Hayreddin Barbarossa.

In the book Al-Istibsar fi 'agaib al-Amsar, written in the late 12th century, the author describes the city as:

"It is an ancient city on the sea, with an old wall that extends into the sea, and it has great strategic significance. The city is abundant in grapes, apples, and fruits. From it, fruits, grapes, and debes are carried to the city of Béjaïa. On this city stands Mount Ketama, known as Mount Zaldwa, a very fertile area with many Berber tribes. It was here that the call of Abdullah al-Da‘i took place. Between Jijel and Béjaïa, on the coast, there is a place called Al-Mansuriyya, with a great mountain above it."

In July 1664, the French took the city. Resistance was organised under the direction of Shaban Aga and the French were driven out in October of the same year. Jijel remained a corsair stronghold until recaptured by the French in 1839. Strong local resistance, finally subdued in 1851, resulted in the construction of three forts along its southern fringe as well as minimal colonisation. The original town was devastated by an earthquake in 1856.

== Communications ==
Due to the rugged landscape, Jijel is slightly isolated. However, it is connected by road to large cities like Bejaïa (90 km west), Setif (135 km southwest) and Constantine (150 km southeast). The city also has its own airport Jijel Ferhat Abbas Airport.

== Infrastructure ==
Jijel is built along modern patterns with wide streets framed by trees. The surroundings consist largely of dense cork-oak forest. A peninsula lies right out from the coast and there is a citadel to the north. There is a hospital, previously a Catholic church (which was demolished), mosques and University of Jijel.

== Port ==
A relatively new port has been built at Djen Djen, approximately 7 miles east of Jijel, which can handle large bulk carriers having a draft up to 18.2m. Presently, the port is mainly used by car carriers and break bulk vessels.

== See also ==
- List of lighthouses in Algeria
- 1856 Djijelli earthquakes
- European enclaves in North Africa before 1830

== Sources ==
- C. Michael Hogan. 2008. Barbary Macaque: Macaca sylvanus, GlobalTwitcher.com, ed. Nicklas Stromberg
- Encyclopædia Britannica. 2002. Edition 15, v. 6 ISBN 0-85229-787-4, ISBN 978-0-85229-787-2
- Enterprise Portuaire de Djen Djen. 2009. Port Authority Website
