= Aokas District =

Coordinates: 36°38′15″N 05°14′39″E

Aokas District Tadayra n Uweqqas
- District

- Location within Algeria
- Country: Algeria
- Province: Béjaïa Province
- Time zone: UTC+1 (CET)

Aokas District (Kabyle: Tadayra n Uweqqas) is a district of Béjaïa Province, Algeria.

== Municipalities ==
The district is further divided into 2 municipalities:

- Aokas
- Tizi N'Berber
