= Tizi N'Berber =

Coordinates: 36°45′N 5°04′E

Tizi N'Berber Tizi n Berber (Kabyle)
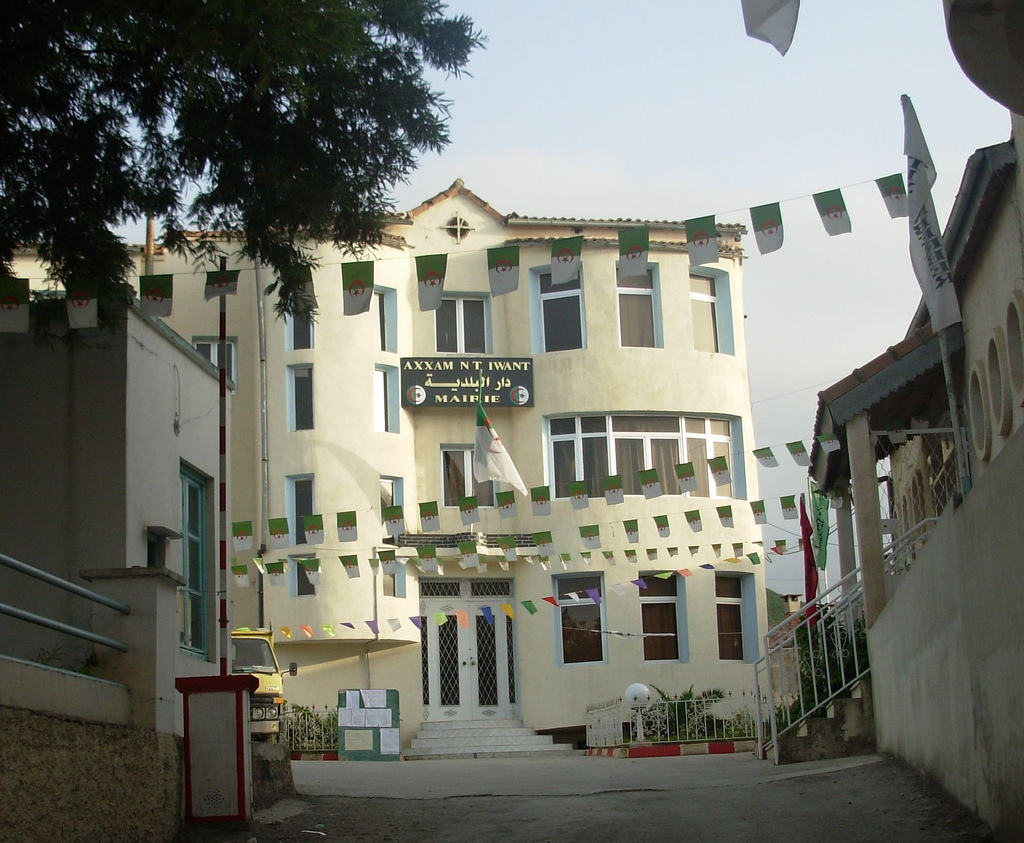

- Location within Algeria
- Country: Algeria
- Province: Béjaïa
- Time zone: UTC+1 (West Africa Time)

Tizi N'Berber (Kabyle: Tizi n Berber) is a commune in northern Algeria, in the Aokas District of Béjaïa Province in the Kabylia region. According to the 2008 census of the Office National des Statistques, it had a population of 12,624.

The commune was established under the territorial reorganization of 1984.

Situated in the mountainous terrain of eastern Kabylia that overlooks the coastal town of Aokas, Tizi N’Berber is known for its traditional Kabyle villages and mountain landscapes, including the Issek peak and the Bouamara waterfall. The name is of Kabyle origin: the element tizi means “mountain pass”, while the second component relates to covering or sheltering, yielding the interpretation “the pass of the covered place”.
