= Guerrouch =

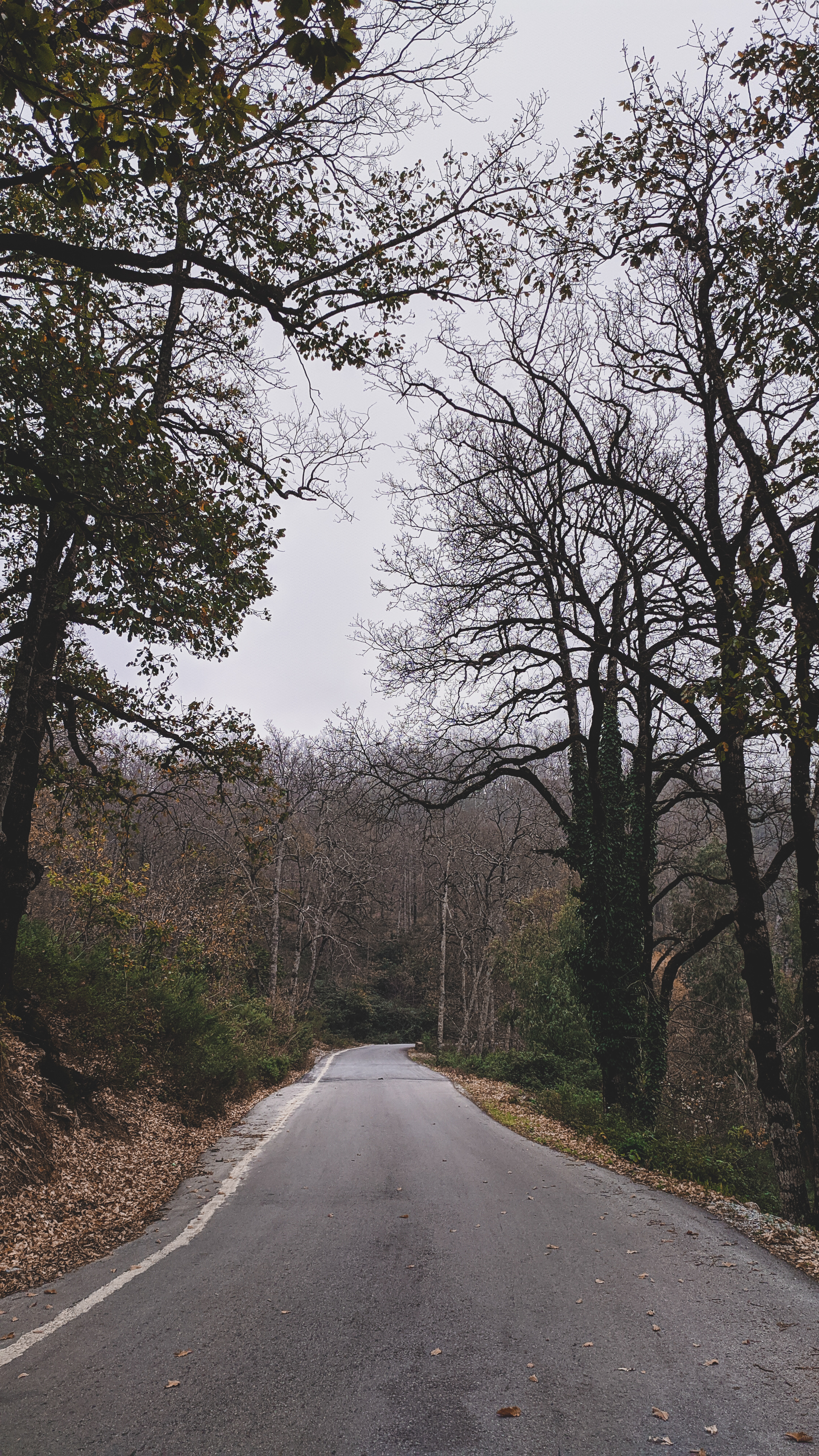
Road through the forest.

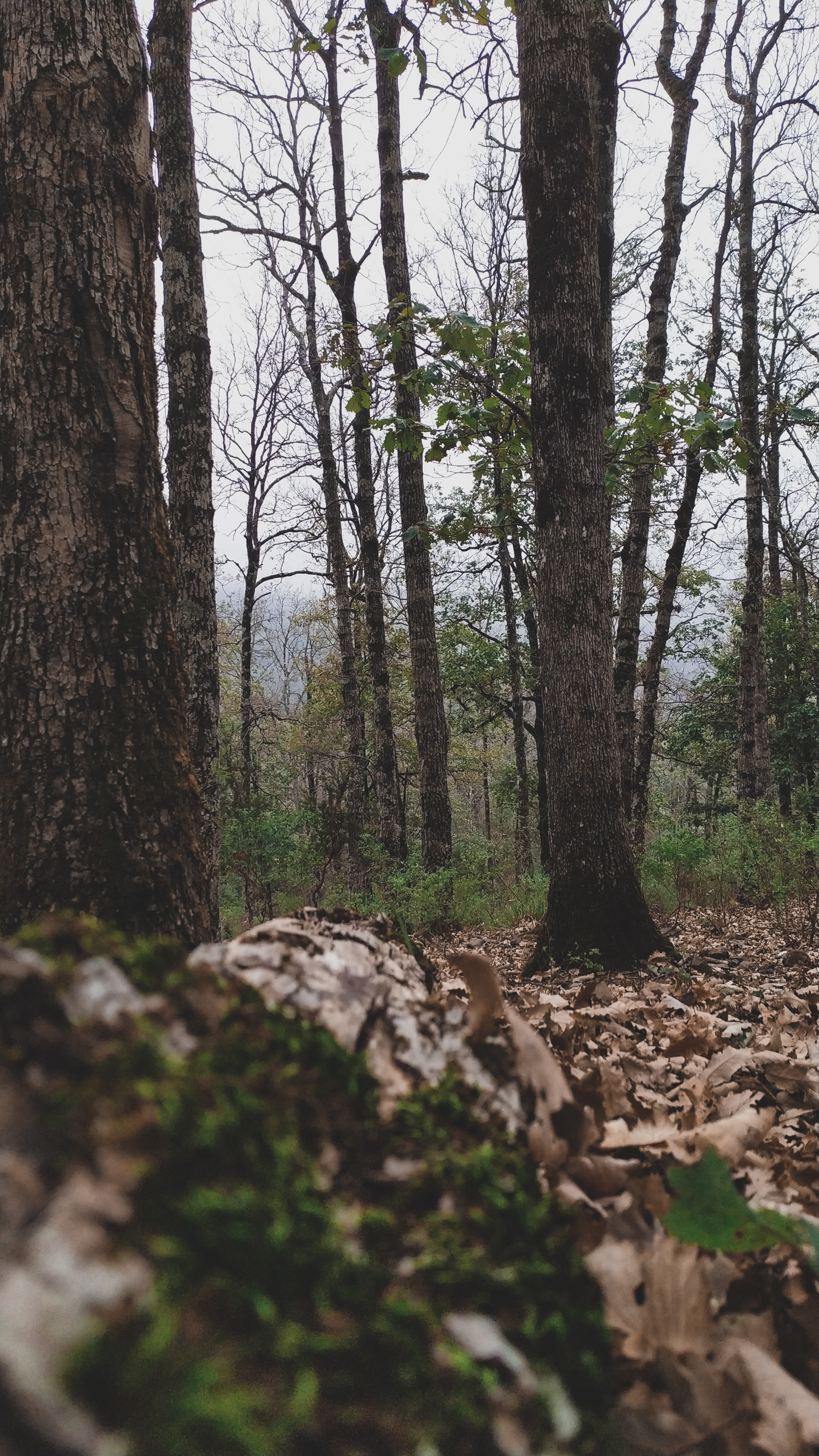
Woods of Guerrouch.

Guerrouch is a region of Algeria within the Petite Kabylie of the Tell Atlas Mountain Range. The Guerrouch is one of the few remaining habitats for the endangered primate Barbary macaque, Macaca sylvanus; prehistorically this primate had a much wider distribution, prior to deforestation activity by the expanding human population.

== See also ==
- Barbary macaque
