= Corniche Jijelienne =

Natural region of northern Algeria

Coordinates: 36°49′36.16″N 5°46′0.51″E

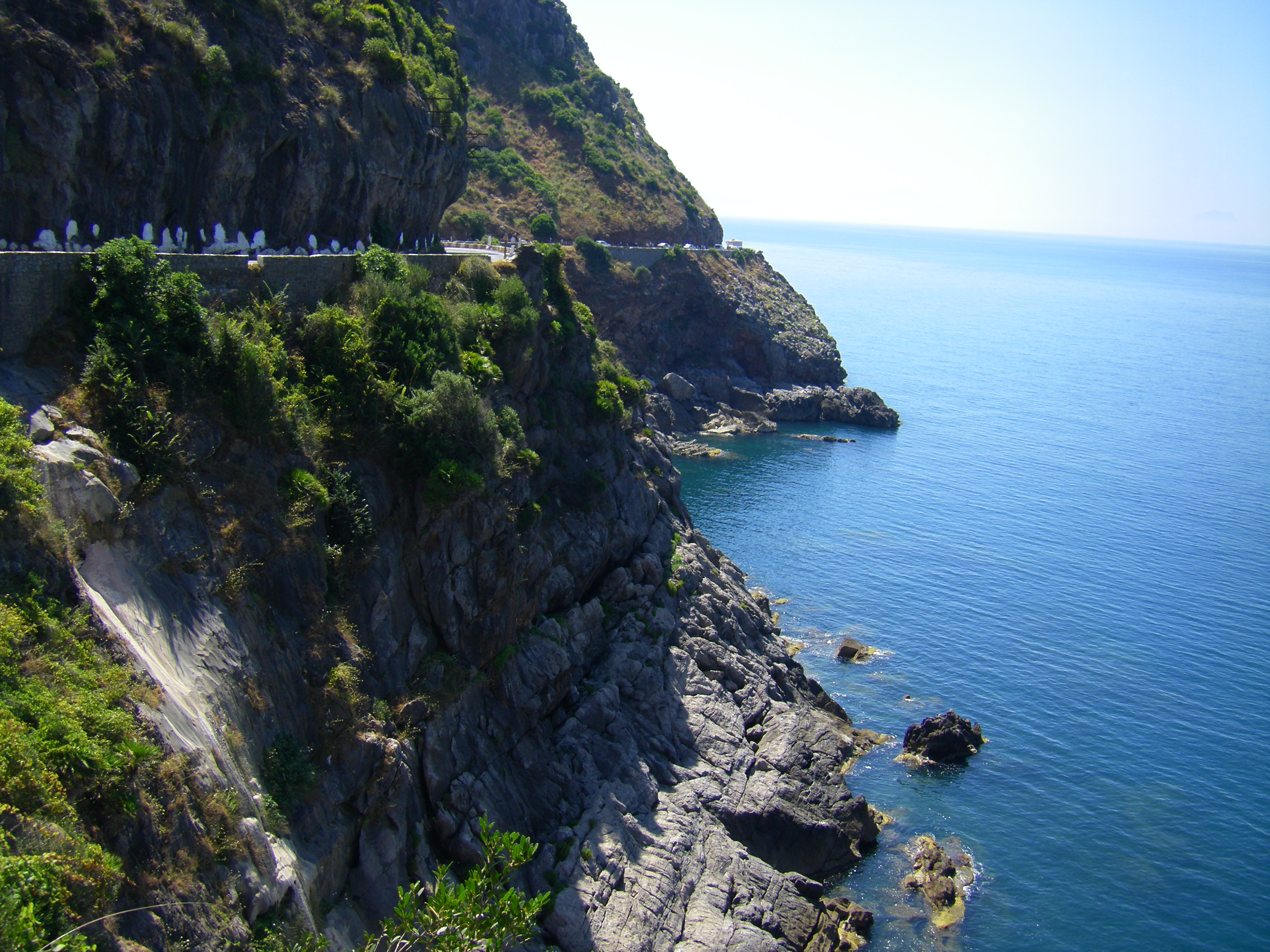
Scenr from Corniche Jijelienne

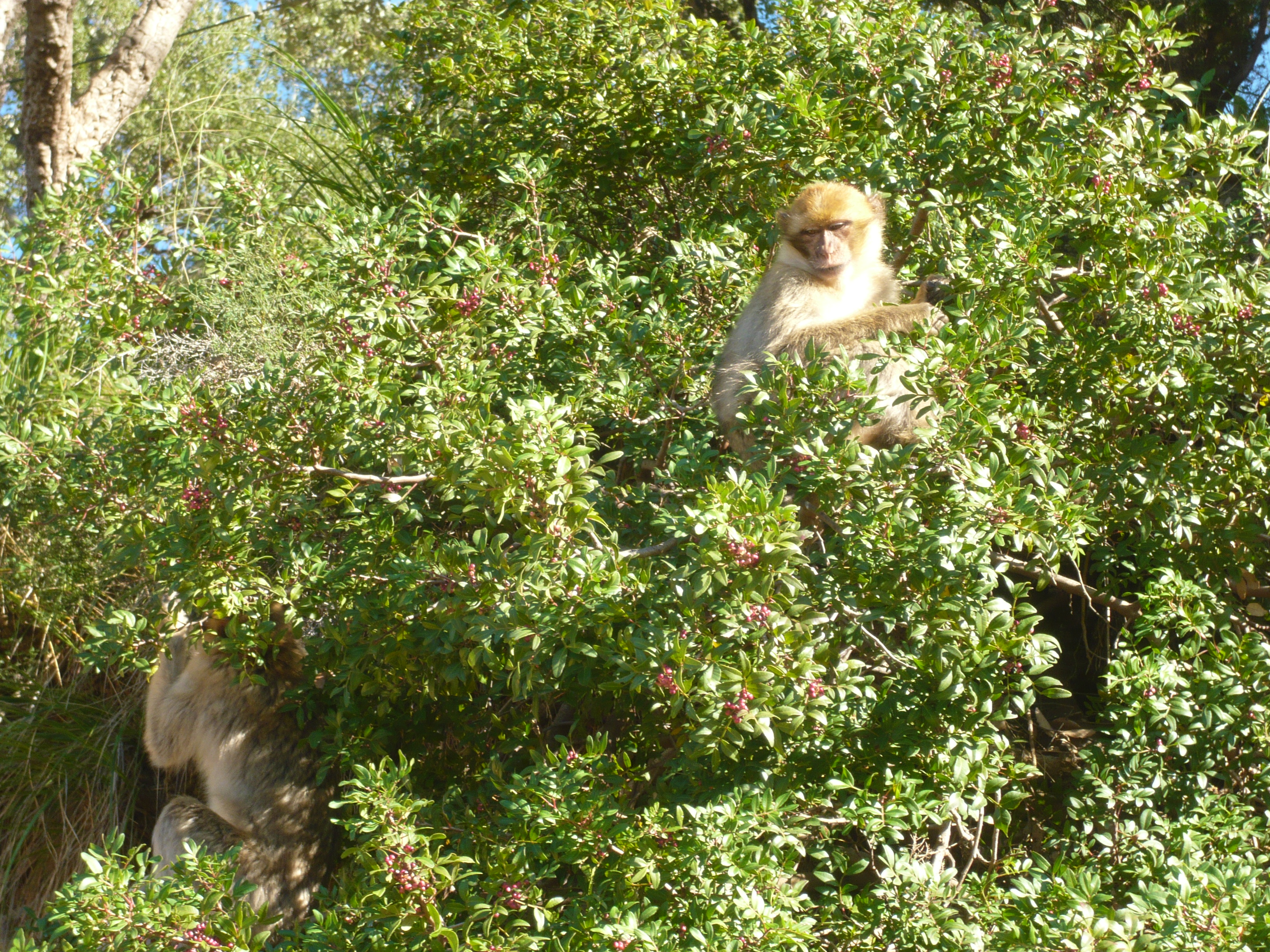
Barbary macaques at Corniche Jijelienne.

Corniche Jjilienne (Arabic: كورنيش جيجل) is a natural region of northern Algeria characterised by rocky forested massifs rising above the coastal plain. The forested areas provide some of the last extant habitat for the endangered Barbary macaque, Macaca sylvanus; this primate prehistorically had a much wider distribution in North Africa than at present.

== See also ==
- Jijel
