= Oak savanna =

Lightly forested grassland where oak trees are dominant

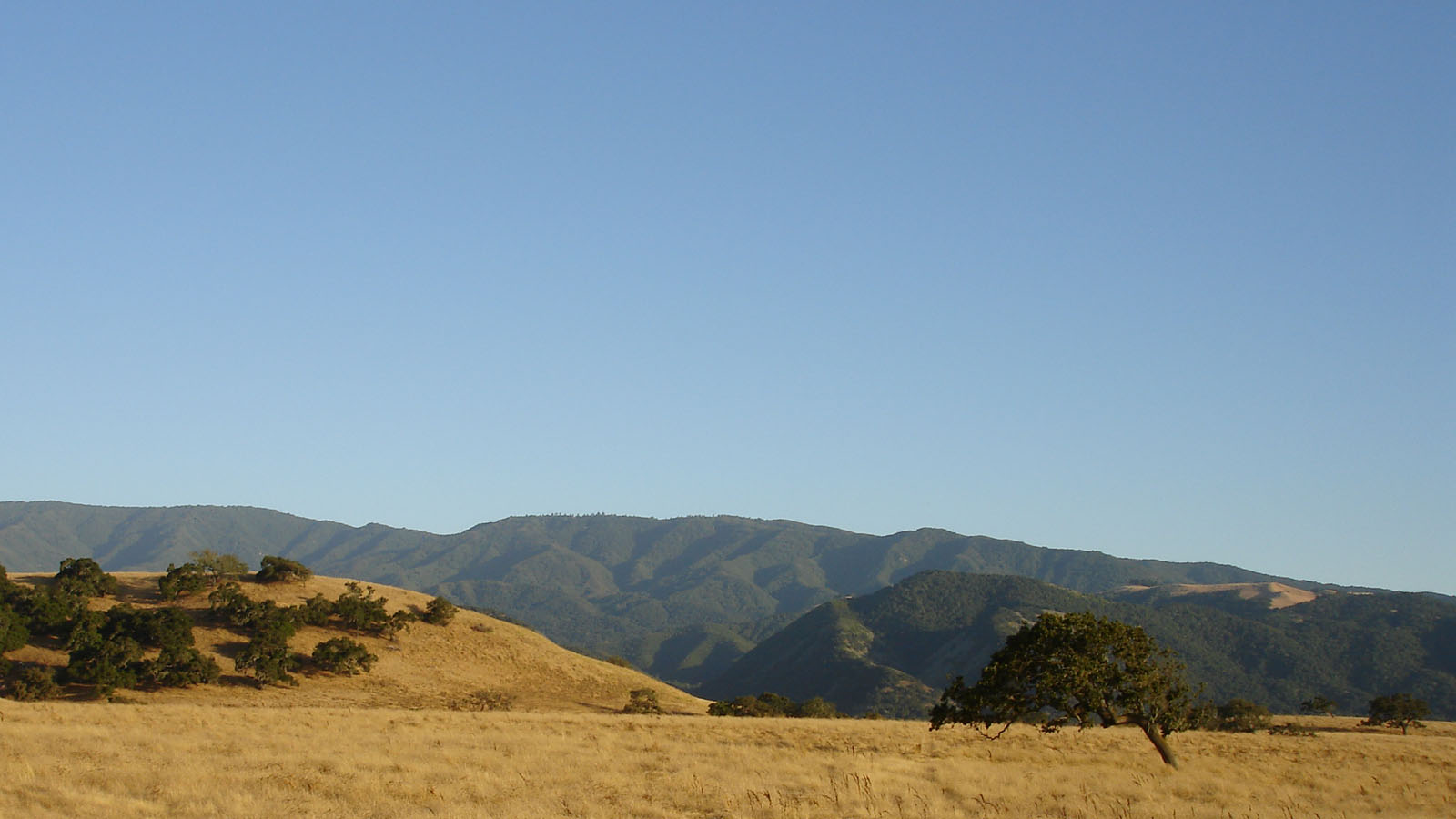
Oak savanna, California

An oak savanna is a type of savanna (or lightly forested grassland) where oaks (Quercus spp.) are the dominant trees. It is also generally characterized by an understory that is lush with grass and herbaceous plants. The terms "oakery" or "woodlands" are also used commonly, though the former is more prevalent when referencing the Mediterranean area. Oak savannas typically exist in areas with low precipitation or high fire frequency and may feature poor soils. Predominant land uses include rangeland agriculture. Naturally, these savannas depend on natural wildfires (e.g. caused by lightning) to maintain their open vegetation.

== United States ==
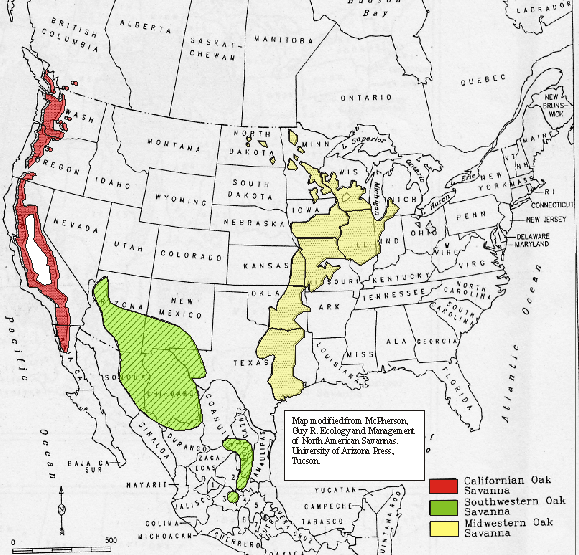
Map of oak savanna distribution in North America

Although there are pockets of oak savanna almost anywhere in North America where oaks are present, there are three major oak savanna areas: 1) California, British Columbia, Washington and Oregon in the west; 2) Southwestern United States and northern Mexico; and 3) the prairie/forest border zone of the Midwestern United States. There are also small areas of oak savannas in other parts of the world. (See also Eastern savannas of the United States for information on pine savannas of the U.S. South.)

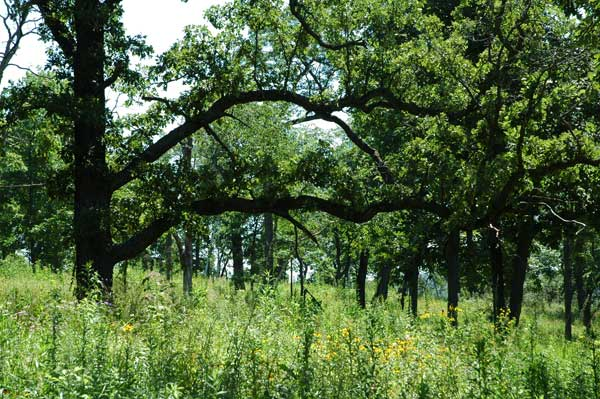
Wisconsin bur oak savanna in mid-summer

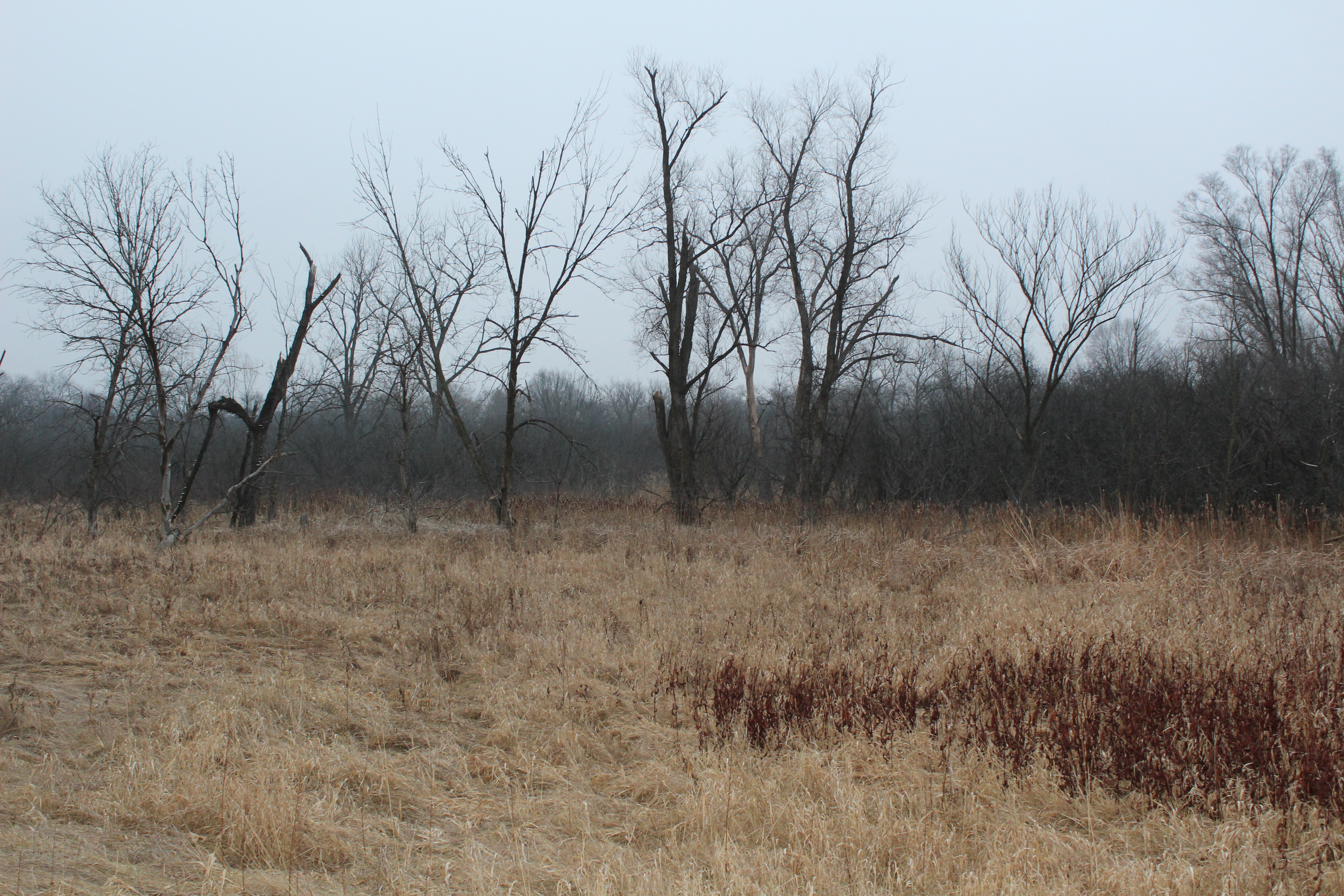
Fox River Grove, Illinois oak savanna; winter

=== California ===
A mix of grassland and savannas make up about 15% of California. Oak subcategories within the state are separated by region, with the northern type including valley oak (Quercus lobata), which is the largest species of oak in the US, garry oak (Quercus garryana) and blue oak (Quercus douglasii), the southern type including Englemann oak (Quercus englemannii) and coast live oak (Quercus agrifolia), and the foothill woodlands including interior live oak (Quercus wislizenii) and blue oak as well.

=== Midwestern oak savannas ===
The oak savannas of the Midwestern United States form a transition zone between the moist broadleaf and mixed forests to the east and the arid Great Plains to the west. They are found in a wide belt from northern Minnesota and southern Wisconsin, down through Iowa, Illinois, northern and central Missouri, eastern Kansas, and central Oklahoma to north-central Texas, with isolated pockets further east around the Great Lakes, including Ontario.

According to the findings of Victoria A. Nuzzo, since there is much variation per state, other names used for the Midwestern oak savanna are oak opening, scrub prairie, oak barrens, and brush savanna.

The bur oak (Quercus macrocarpa) is the dominant species in northern oak savannas on rich soils, although black oak (Quercus velutina), white oak (Quercus alba), and Hill's oak (Quercus ellipsoidalis) are sometimes present. On sandy soils, black oak is the dominant tree. The dominant tree in the south is usually black oak, although the chinquapin oak (Quercus muhlenbergii), post oak (Quercus stellata), and black-jack oak (Quercus marilandica) are also common.

The flora of the herbaceous layer generally consists of species associated with tallgrass prairies, both grasses and flowering plants, although some woodland species may be present. Some of these plants can include white wild indigo plant (Baptisia leucantha), purple coneflower (Echinacea purpurea) and pasture rose (Rosa carolina). There are also a few species that are unique to oak savannas. Some important species in the midwest oak savanna include a variety of bats, like the evening bat (Nycticeius humeralis) found in Missouri, and many types of birds, including the blue winged warbler (Vermivora cyanoptera), field sparrow (Spizella pusilla), and summer tanager (Piranga rubra). Oak savannas, because of their mixture of grassland, woodland, and unique savanna species, typically have a higher plant diversity than grasslands and woodlands combined.

=== History ===
Before European settlement, the oak savanna, a characteristic fire ecology, was extensive and was often a dominant part of the ecosystem. Fires, set by human activity or by lightning, ensured that the savanna areas did not turn into forests. Savannas normally were found next to large prairies near rolling hills and this combination of habitat was perfect for deer, bison, elk, and other grazing animals. Only trees with a high tolerance for fire, principally certain oak species, were able to survive. On sandy soils, black oak (Quercus velutina) predominated. On rich soils bur oak (Quercus macrocarpa) was the major tree in Midwestern North America. These savanna areas provided habitat for many animals, including American bison, elk, and white-tailed deer.

The understory flourishes from exposure, as the oaks tend to be scattered, making for a less dense canopy. Fires contain the oak population, as too much shade would eliminate the grasses underneath.

The most fire-tolerant of the oak species is the bur oak (Quercus macrocarpa), which is especially common in hill-country savannas in the Midwest.

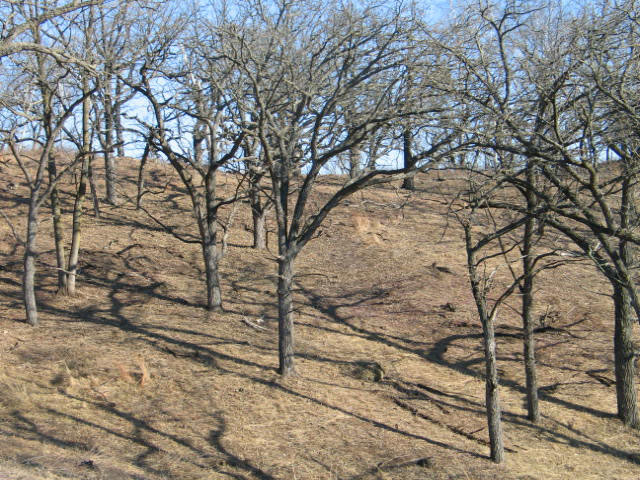
Fire-tolerant bur oak savanna in Wisconsin hill country

European settlers cleared much of the savanna for agricultural use. In addition, they suppressed the fire cycle. Thus surviving pockets of savanna typically became less like savannas and more like forests or thickets. Many oak savanna plant and animal species became extinct or rare.

However, a lack of generalized terminology or documentation in historical records has made it difficult to know about the past state of oak savannas.

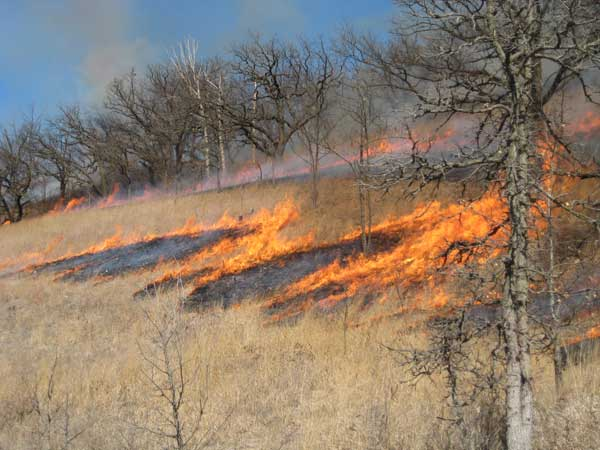
Prescribed burn; Wisconsin bur oak savanna

=== Conservation and restoration ===
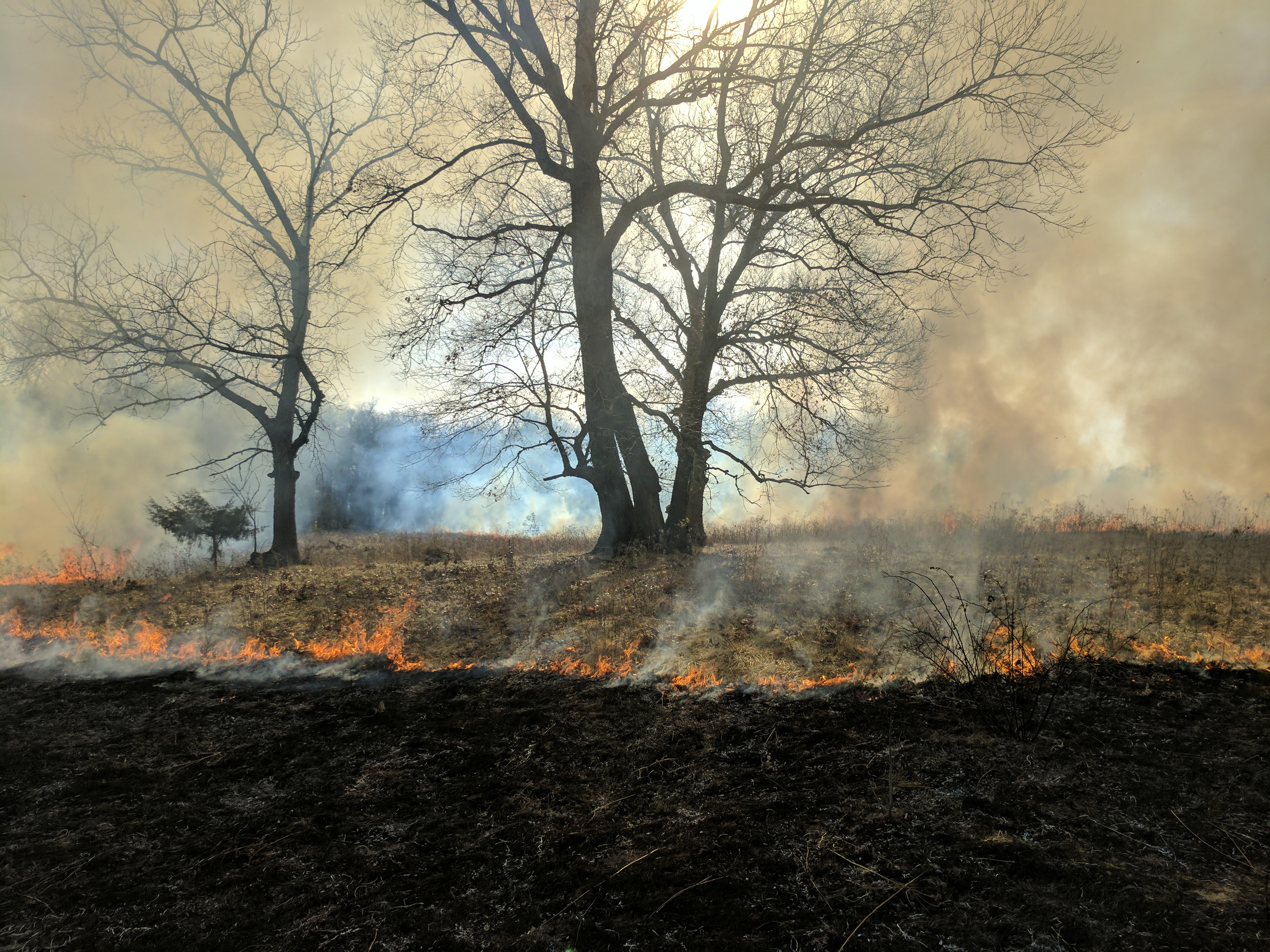
Prescribed burn in oak savanna in Iowa

Large areas of the Oak Savanna are affected by woody plant encroachment. With the rising interest in environmental conservation, restoration and preservation of surviving areas of oak savanna began. Low intensity, Spring-time prescribed burns have been used since 1964 at the Cedar Creek Ecosystem Science Reserve in Minnesota in an attempt to restore the area to an oak savanna. Burned areas are now more savanna-like, having greater grass and forb with lower shrub and tree representation, than unburned areas, but still have higher overstory densities than apparently existed in pre-settlement times. Decreasing canopy cover density is a key part in these restoration efforts.

Restoration work in the US began in the 1970s in Illinois, followed by work in Wisconsin, Indiana, Iowa, Missouri, and Minnesota. The Bald Hill Natural Area in Corvallis, Oregon, was established in the 1990s in part to protect oak savanna remnants. At one point in time the oak savanna was the most common type of vegetation found in the midwest, but it is now endangered with many ecologists every year working on replacing the oak savannas that have been destroyed in the past.

For centuries, the issue of oak regeneration failure has been acknowledged. Historical records, such as French ordinances dating back to the 13th century, illustrate early recognition of obstacles to oak regeneration. These ordinances required the planting of oak seedlings to prevent overharvesting, given oak's significant timber worth and adaptability.

=== Current distribution ===
Pre-settlement there were approximately 50,000,000 acres of oak savanna in what is now the Midwestern United States, all of it located exclusively in a wide strip stretching from southwestern Michigan to eastern Nebraska, and from southern Manitoba to central Texas. After Europeans arrived, fire suppression and settlement diminished the oak savannas to a fraction of their former expanse; they currently exist in many fragmented pockets throughout their native range.

Many sites are protected and maintained by government bodies or non-profit organizations such as The Nature Conservancy, the Wisconsin and Minnesota Departments of Natural Resources, and the Iowa Natural Heritage Foundation. In the midwest, about only 30,000 acres total of oak savanna still exist. The savannas that remain are fairly small at about 100 acres and this rarity has caused them to be categorized as “globally imperilled”. It is estimated that about only less than 0.02% of the original savannas remain due to human interaction and many organizations and conservations are prioritizing restoring and recreating these ecosystems in the midwest.

Examples of remnant oak savanna include:

- Kankakee Sands preserve complex in Illinois and Indiana.
- Iroquois County State Wildlife Area in Illinois.
- Neal Smith Wildlife Refuge near Prairie City, Iowa.
- Indiana Dunes National Park in Indiana.
- Hobart Nature District in Hobart, Indiana.
- Numerous State Natural Areas in Wisconsin.
- Lake County Forest Preserve District in Illinois.
- Cook County Forest Preserve District in Illinois.
- Waterfall Glen Forest Preserve near Darien, Illinois.
- Oak Openings Preserve Metropark in Ohio.
- Pinery Provincial Park on Lake Huron in Ontario, Canada.
- High Park in Toronto, Ontario

Examples of restored oak savanna sites:

- Indiana's Conrad Savanna Nature Preserve in north Newton County.
- Oak savanna restoration project site on Winchell Trail in Minneapolis, Minnesota
- Wisconsin's Pleasant Valley Conservancy State Natural Area.
- Minnesota's Belwin Conservancy.
- In Minneapolis on the west bluffs of the Mississippi River, Dakota sacred site Mni Ówe Sni, renamed Coldwater Spring by settlers.

== In the Western Palearctic ==
In Europe, wood pastures, semi-open oak woodlands used for grazing, were widespread and common landscape features across the continent during the Middle Ages, but have since declined. Traditionally, they have been considered purely anthropogenic landscapes, the result of human clearing of virgin forest since the beginning of the European Neolithic. However, according to proponents of the controversial wood-pasture hypothesis, they can be viewed as functional analogs to the oak savannas that may have naturally covered large parts of Europe during the early Holocene. After the Industrial Revolution and the accompanying intensification of land use, they became rarer and were displaced by forests, open croplands, pastures, and meadows. Today, they are largely confined to small patches in western and central Europe, while intact forest pastures are still found in eastern Europe, especially Romania. In the Mediterranean region, oak savannas are still widespread, especially on the Iberian Peninsula.

=== In the Mediterranean ===
In the Western Mediterranean, oak savannas, known as dehesas in Spanish and montados in Portuguese, are at present widespread, concentrated in Southern Portugal, the Extremadura and Andalusia. They are actively managed and used for the production of cork and as pastures for Spanish fighting bulls and the black Iberian pig for the production of Jamón ibérico, among other uses. The main tree components are ballota oak (Quercus rotundifolia) and cork oak (Quercus suber), but Portuguese oak (Quercus faginea) and Pyrenean oak (Quercus pyrenaica) may also be common. Other oak species found in the area include Mirbeck's oak (Quercus canariensis), downy oak (Quercus pubescens), pedunculate oak (Quercus robur), sessile oak (Quercus petraea), Quercus estremadurensis, Quercus × cerrioides, kermes oak (Quercus coccifera) and Lusitanian oak (Quercus lusitanica).

In the Eastern Mediterranean, oak rangelands are still common landscape elements in Greece, Anatolia and the Levant. They are formed by a number of oak species, including pedunculate oak (Quercus robur), sessile oak (Quercus petraea subsp. polycarpa), downy oak (Quercus pubescens), Hungarian oak (Quercus frainetto), Quercus dalechampii, Strandzha oak (Quercus hartwissiana), Austrian oak (Quercus cerris), Macedonian oak (Quercus trojana), holly oak (Quercus ilex), Kasnak oak (Quercus vulcanica), Aleppo oak (Quercus infectoria), Lebanon oak (Quercus libani), Tabor oak (Quercus ithaburensis), Valonia oak (Quercus ithaburensis subsp. macrolepis), Brant's oak (Quercus brantii), Quercus aucheri, Quercus look and kermes oak (Quercus coccifera).

== See also ==
- California oak woodland
