= Quercus trojana subsp. euboica =

Scientific classification
- Kingdom: Plantae
- Clade: Tracheophytes
- Clade: Angiosperms
- Clade: Eudicots
- Clade: Rosids
- Order: Fagales
- Family: Fagaceae
- Genus: Quercus
- Species: Q. trojana
- Subspecies: Q. t. subsp. euboica

Trinomial name
- Quercus trojana subsp. euboica (Papaioannou) K.I.Chr.

Quercus trojana subsp. euboica is a subspecies of the Macedonian oak (Quercus trojana), a member of the beech family (Fagaceae). It is endemic to the island of Euboea in Greece, where it occurs in dry thickets and Aleppo pine (Pinus halepensis) forests. It is characterised by its small, shrubby habit and its leaves, which are conspicuously whitish below. Due to its unique morphology along with an apparently strong genetic differentiation, it is alternatively treated as a distinct species (Quercus euboica). Indeed, one genetic study indicated that it might be closer to the Turkey oak (Quercus cerris) than to the Macedonian oak, and concluded that it should be given species status. Due to the taxon's narrow distribution, it is likely to be threatened.

== Description ==
Quercus trojana subsp. euboica is a small deciduous tree or shrub up to 4 m in height. The leaves are leathery and narrow, and usually up to 7 centimetres (2.8 in) long and 3 centimetres (1.2 in) wide. They are green on the upper side, but the lower side is densely pubescent and therefore silvery white. The midrib and veins are green and conspicuous, the petiole is short (about 5 millimetres (0.20 in)). The acorns are up to 2 centimetres (0.79 in) in length and are enclosed in a cup of about 3 × 2 cm. As in all sect. Cerris oaks, they ripen after 18 months.

== Taxonomy and systematics ==
Quercus trojana subsp. euboica was originally described in 1949 by the Greek botanist Johannes C. Papaioannou, who considered it to be a distinct species which he named Quercus euboica. In 1997, the species was reclassified as a subspecies of the Macedonian oak (Quercus trojana), which is widespread in the central Balkans, western Anatolia, and Apulia in Italy. However, the species' status remains unclear, as a genetic study by Simeone et al. (2018) found it to be a species distinct from the Macedonian oak, and perhaps more closely allied to Turkey oak (Q. cerris). This conclusion was also followed by Denk et al. (2023). Thus, despite its morphological similarity with oaks from subsection Libani (Q. trojana, Q. libani), Q. trojana subsp. euboica appears to belong in subsection Cerris, alongside Q. castaneifolia, Q. cerris and Q. look. Plants of the World Online, however, still treats it as Quercus trojana subsp. euboica (as of November 2026).

== Distribution and ecology ==
Quercus trojana subsp. euboica is endemic to the Greek island Euboea, more specifically a few localities in the northwestern section of the Island. It is primarily found in Aleppo pine (Pinus halepensis) woodlands and shrub, where it occurs in plant communities together with western strawberry tree (Arbutus unedo), Erica manipuliflora, pink rock rose (Cistus creticus), mock privet (Philliyrea latifolia), Hypericum empetrifolium, Mediterranean hairgrass (Aira elegantissima), clustered carline thistle (Carlina corymbosa), Cantabrican morning glory (Convolvulus cantabrica), Festuca callieri, Jurinea mollis, badassi (Lotus dorycnium), Piptatherum coerulescens, and Mediterranean clubmoss (Selaginella denticulata) and others.

== Conservation ==
Although the subspecies' status has not been assessed, it is suggested to be vulnerable (VU) based on its narrow distribution and low number of known sites where it occurs.
