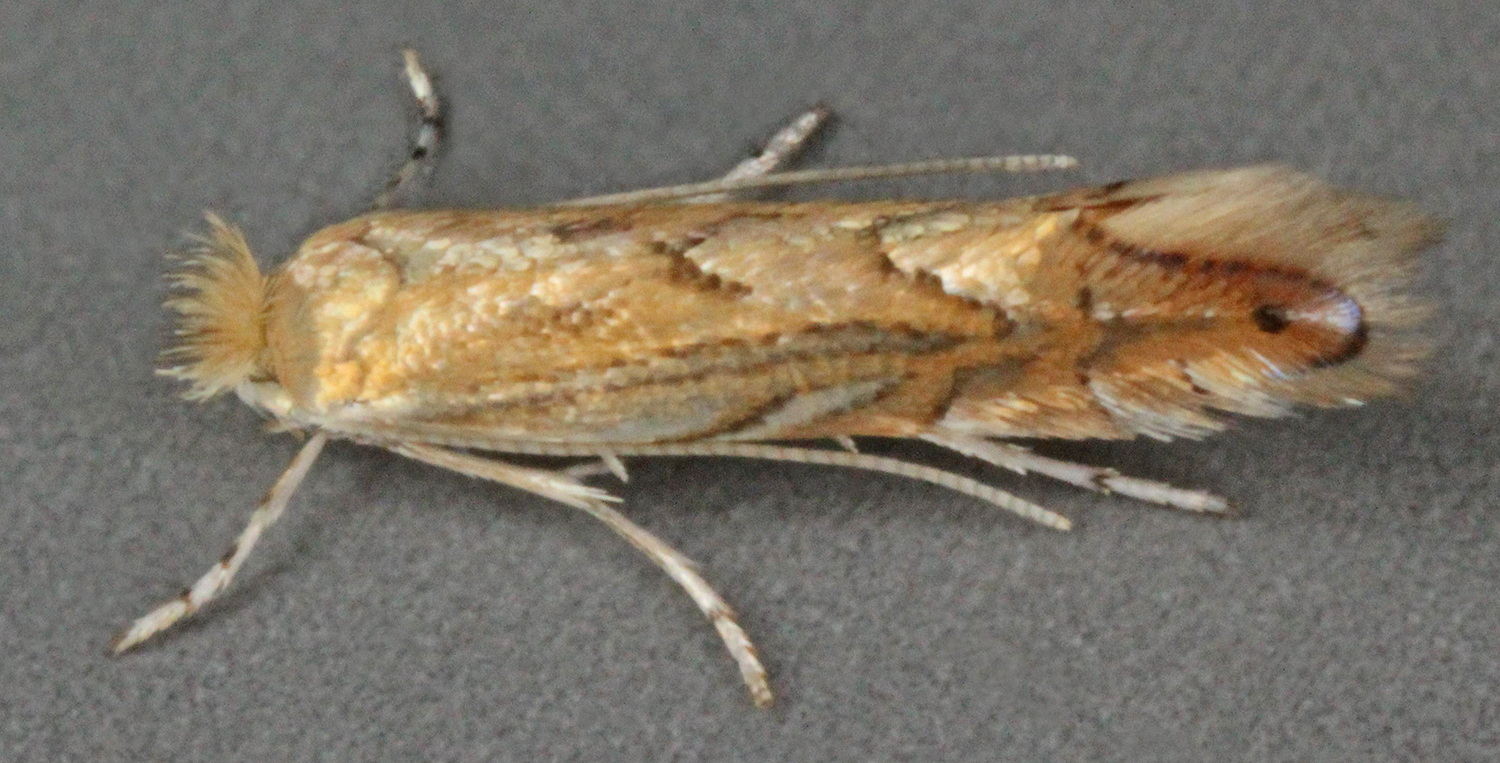
- Phyllonorycter quercifoliella, North Wales

Scientific classification
- Kingdom: Animalia
- Phylum: Arthropoda
- Clade: Pancrustacea
- Class: Insecta
- Order: Lepidoptera
- Family: Gracillariidae
- Genus: Phyllonorycter
- Species: P. quercifoliella

Binomial name
- Phyllonorycter quercifoliella (Zeller, 1839)

Synonyms
- Lithocolletis quercifoliella Zeller, 1839

= Phyllonorycter quercifoliella =

Species of moth

Phyllonorycter quercifoliella is a moth of the family Gracillariidae. It is known from all of Europe, except for the Mediterranean islands.

The wingspan is 7–9 mm. The forewings are shining pale golden-ochreous; a whitish dark-margined median streak from base to beyond middle;four costal and three dorsal shining white wedge-shaped spots, dark- margined anteriorly and first costal posteriorly; a black apical dot;an indistinct dark hook in apical cilia. Hindwings are grey. The larva is ochreous-whitish; head brown.

There are two generations per year with adults on wing in April and May and again in August and September.

The larvae feed on Quercus cerris, Quercus faginea, Quercus libani, Quercus petraea, Quercus robur, Quercus trojana and Quercus x turneri. They mine the leaves of their host plant.
