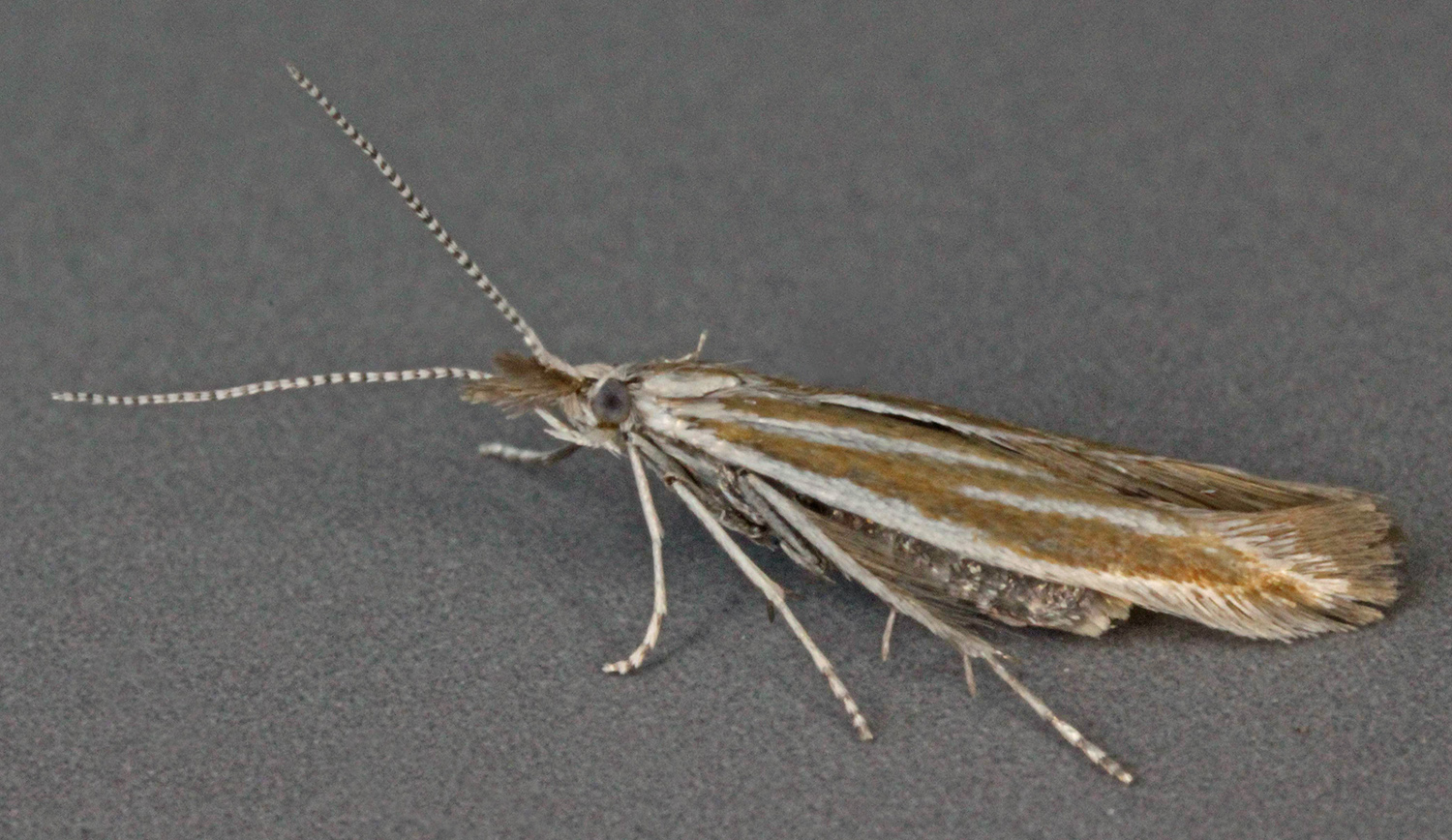
- Coleophora pyrrhulipennella North Wales

Scientific classification
- Kingdom: Animalia
- Phylum: Arthropoda
- Clade: Pancrustacea
- Class: Insecta
- Order: Lepidoptera
- Family: Coleophoridae
- Genus: Coleophora
- Species: C. pyrrhulipennella

Binomial name
- Coleophora pyrrhulipennella Zeller, 1839

= Coleophora pyrrhulipennella =

Species of moth

Coleophora pyrrhulipennella is a moth of the family Coleophoridae found in Europe. It was first described by Philipp Christoph Zeller in 1839.

== Description ==
The wingspan is 11–14 mm. Coleophora species have narrow blunt to pointed forewings and a weakly defined tornus. The hindwings are narrow-elongate and very long-fringed. The upper surfaces have neither a discal spot nor transverse lines. Each abdomen segment of the abdomen has paired patches of tiny spines which show through the scales. The resting position is horizontal with the front end raised and the cilia give the hind tip a frayed and upturned look if the wings are rolled around the body. C. pyrrhulipennella characteristics include head light bronzy-grey, whitish-mixed. Antennae white, ringed with fuscous, basal joint with light ochreous-greyish tuft. Forewings brownish-ochreous, lighter dorsally; a costal streak, one in disc from middle, one along fold, and one along dorsum shining white. Hindwings grey. Only reliably identified by dissection and microscopic examination of the genitalia.

Adults are on wing in June and July.

The larvae feed on heather (Calluna vulgaris), tree heath (Erica arborea), bell heather (Erica cinerea), Erica manipuliflora and crossed-leaf heath (Erica tetralix).

== Distribution ==
The moth is found from Fennoscandia to the Mediterranean and from Ireland and Portugal to Romania and Crete.
