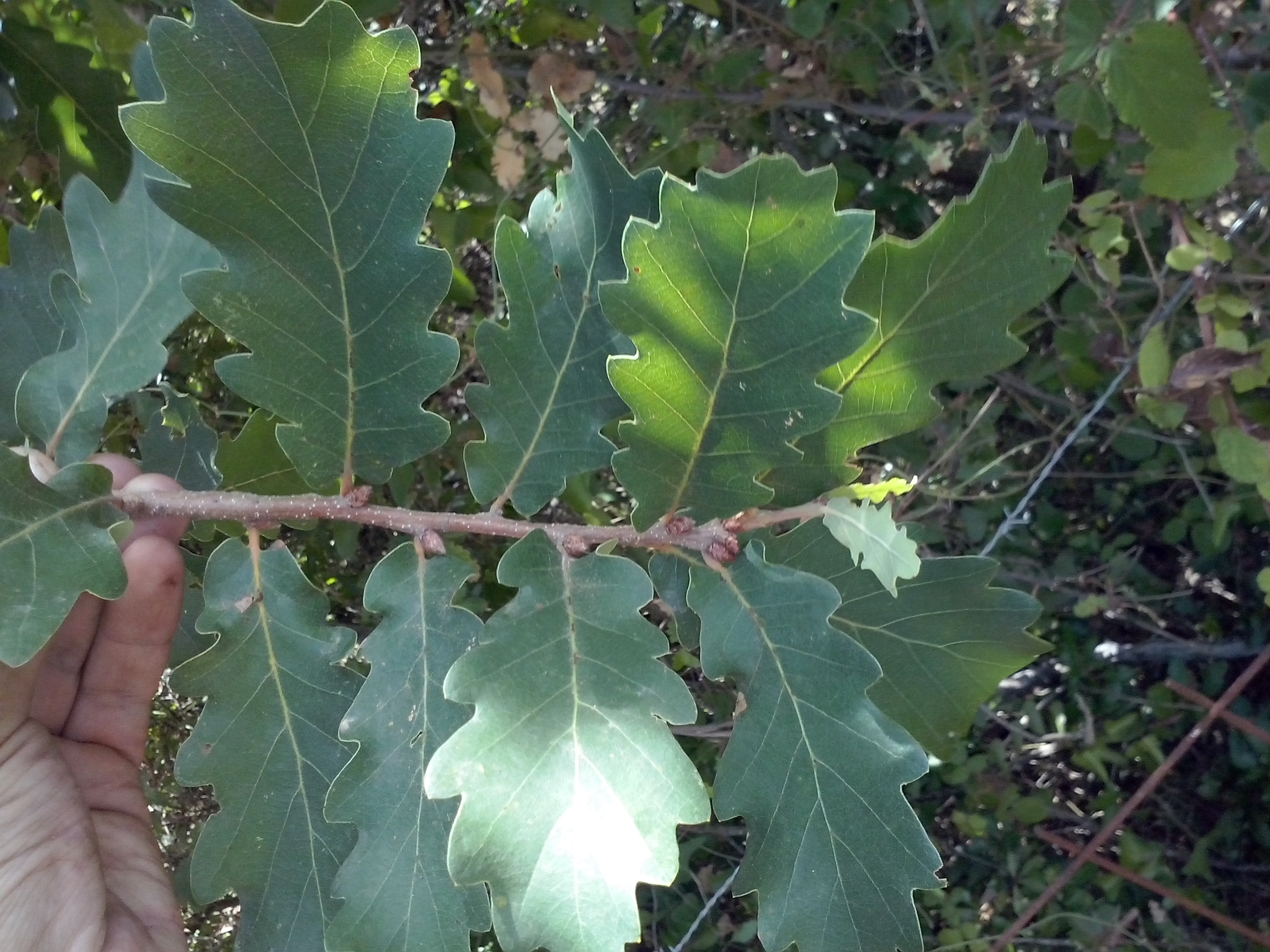
- Quercus estremadurensis, Jerez de los Caballeros, Badajoz, Spain

Scientific classification
- Kingdom: Plantae
- Clade: Tracheophytes
- Clade: Angiosperms
- Clade: Eudicots
- Clade: Rosids
- Order: Fagales
- Family: Fagaceae
- Genus: Quercus
- Subgenus: Quercus subg. Quercus
- Section: Quercus sect. Quercus
- Species: Q. estremadurensis

Binomial name
- Quercus estremadurensis O.Schwarz

Synonyms
- Quercus robur subsp. estremadurensis (O.Schwarz) A.Camus; Quercus robur var. conimbricensis A.Camus

= Quercus estremadurensis =

Species of oak

Quercus estremadurensis is a species of oak in the family Fagaceae, native to Portugal, western Spain and Morocco. It was first described by Otto Karl Anton Schwarz in 1935. It has also been treated as a subspecies of Quercus robur, Q. robur subsp. estremadurensis. It is placed in section Quercus.

== Description ==
Quercus estremadurensis is a mostly deciduous tree (when mature rarely marcescent or semievergreen) within the roburoid quercus subsection (that also comprises Quercus robur, Quercus petraea, Quercus hartwissiana and Quercus canariensis) thus sharing a good number of features with its closest relative Quercus robur such as bearing shortly petiolate broad and glabrous auriculated leaves, and long peduncled acorns. Also features close resemblance to other members of that subsection as happens with young tomentose sprouts and branches and fairly well elongated leaves brandishing high number of shallow lobes such as we can find in Quercus canariensis or Quercus hartwissiana.

Due to its relictic status of conservation and its high propension to hybridise with any other surrounding quercus species, many characteristics are still certainly not easy to clear cut and lie under deep scientific discussion.

== Distribution ==
Cited only in a few loci scatterly placed all over the southwestern district of the Iberian peninsula where the species might have survived the increasing process of aridification that took place in the mediterranean basin after the slow retreat of glacial conditions during last glaciation and suffering the effects of a bottleneck phenomenon that clearly did not allow the populations to counteract and recover lost environments. Thus the cited locations for the species only contain one to five individuals but the occurrence is nevertheless not to be overlooked, occurring from Ourense in southern Galicia to northern Morocco in no less than one hundred stands, most of them appearing in the central part of Portugal both near the coast and in the mountainous interior. Over the border with Spain it has been found in Extremadura and west Andalusia, with its easternmost stand in the mountain range of Siruela, Badajoz.
