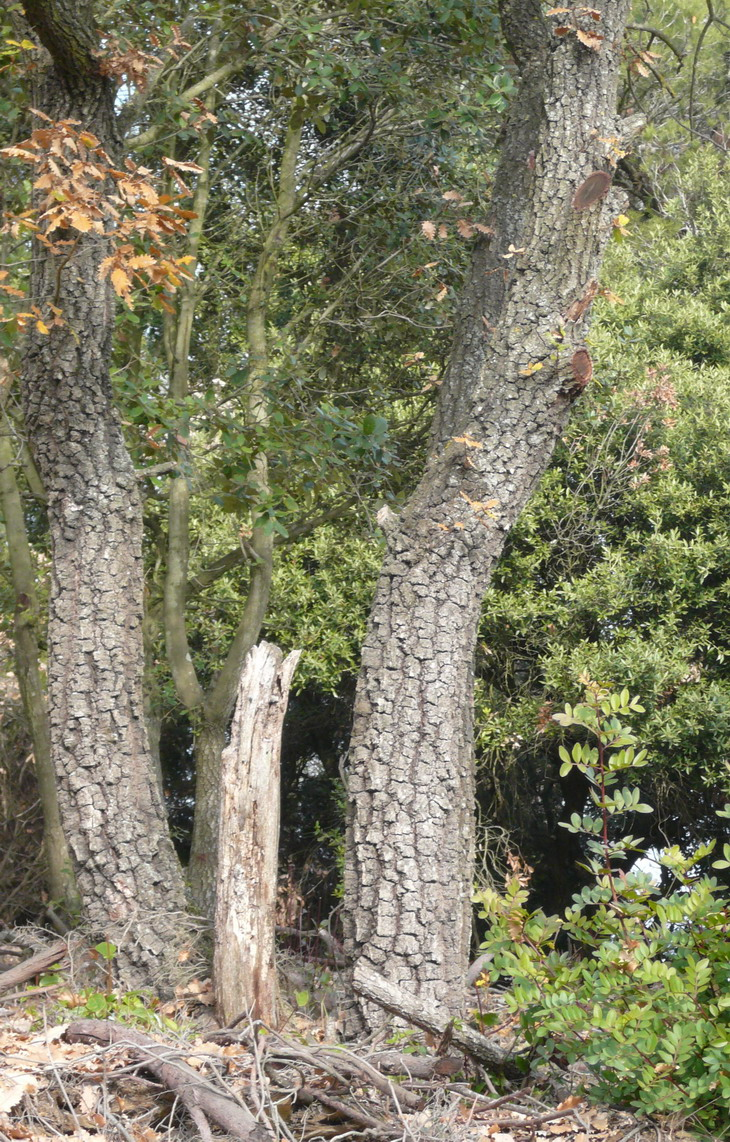
- Trunks in winter

Conservation status
- Conservation Dependent (IUCN 2.3)

Scientific classification
- Kingdom: Plantae
- Clade: Tracheophytes
- Clade: Angiosperms
- Clade: Eudicots
- Clade: Rosids
- Order: Fagales
- Family: Fagaceae
- Genus: Quercus
- Subgenus: Quercus subg. Quercus
- Section: Quercus sect. Quercus
- Species: Q. × cerrioides

Binomial name
- Quercus × cerrioides Willk. & Costa

= Quercus × cerrioides =

Species of oak tree

Quercus × cerrioides is a hybrid oak species in the family Fagaceae. The tree is endemic to Spain. It is a conservation dependent plant threatened by habitat loss. Its parent are Q. canariensis and Q. pubescens subsp. subpyrenaica. Both parents are placed in section Quercus.

== See also ==
- Quercus afares
- Mediterranean conifer and mixed forests
