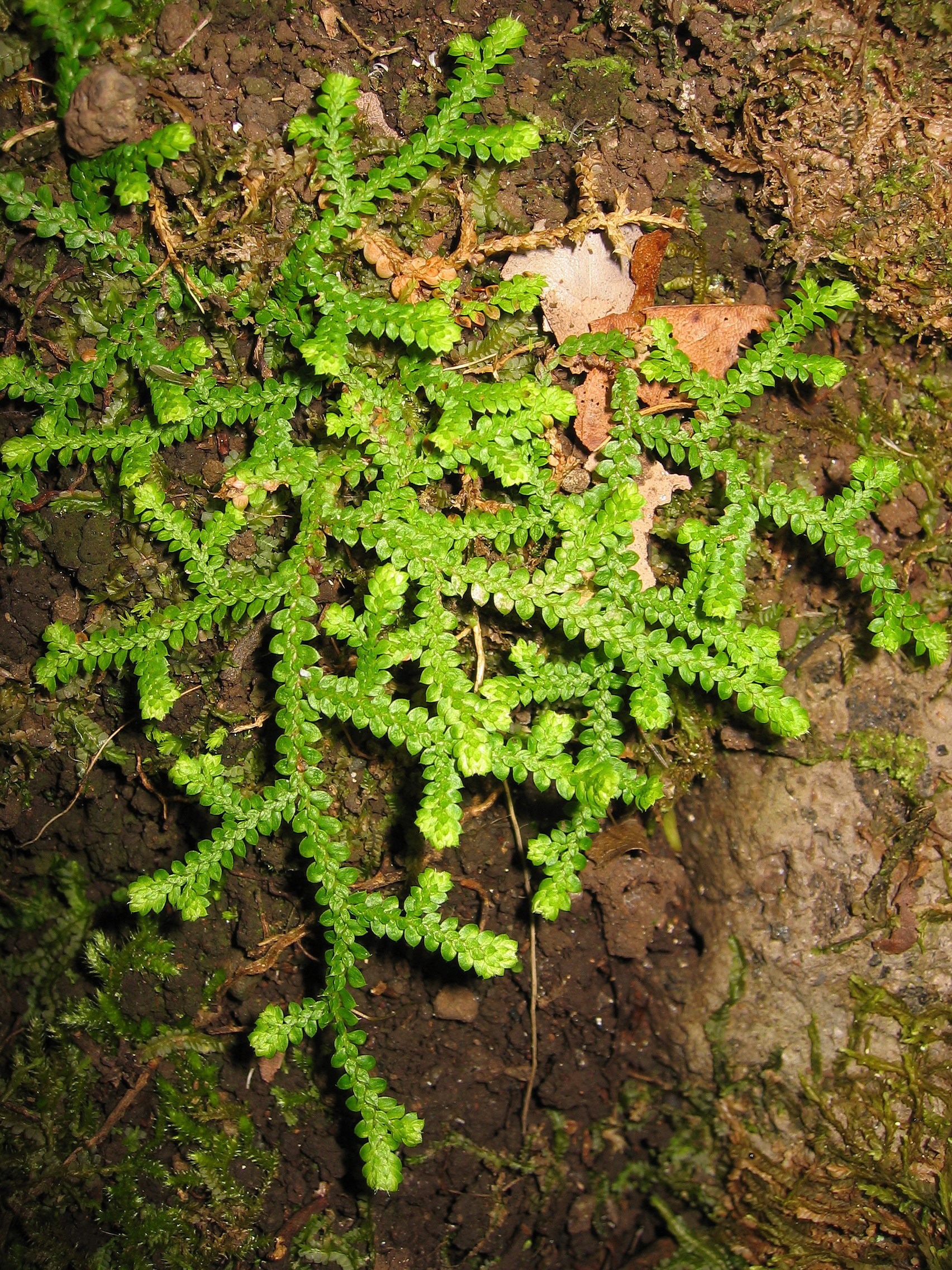
- S. denticulata photographed on La Palma, Canary Islands

Conservation status
- Least Concern (IUCN 3.1)

Scientific classification
- Kingdom: Plantae
- Clade: Tracheophytes
- Clade: Lycophytes
- Class: Lycopodiopsida
- Order: Selaginellales
- Family: Selaginellaceae
- Genus: Selaginella
- Species: S. denticulata

Binomial name
- Selaginella denticulata (L.) Spring

Synonyms
- Lycopodium denticulatum L.; Plananthus denticulatus (L.) P.Beauv.; Lycopodioides denticulata (L.) Kuntze; Lycopodina denticulata (L.) Bubani; Selaginella denticulata f. platystachya Hieron.

= Selaginella denticulata =

Species of spore-bearing plant

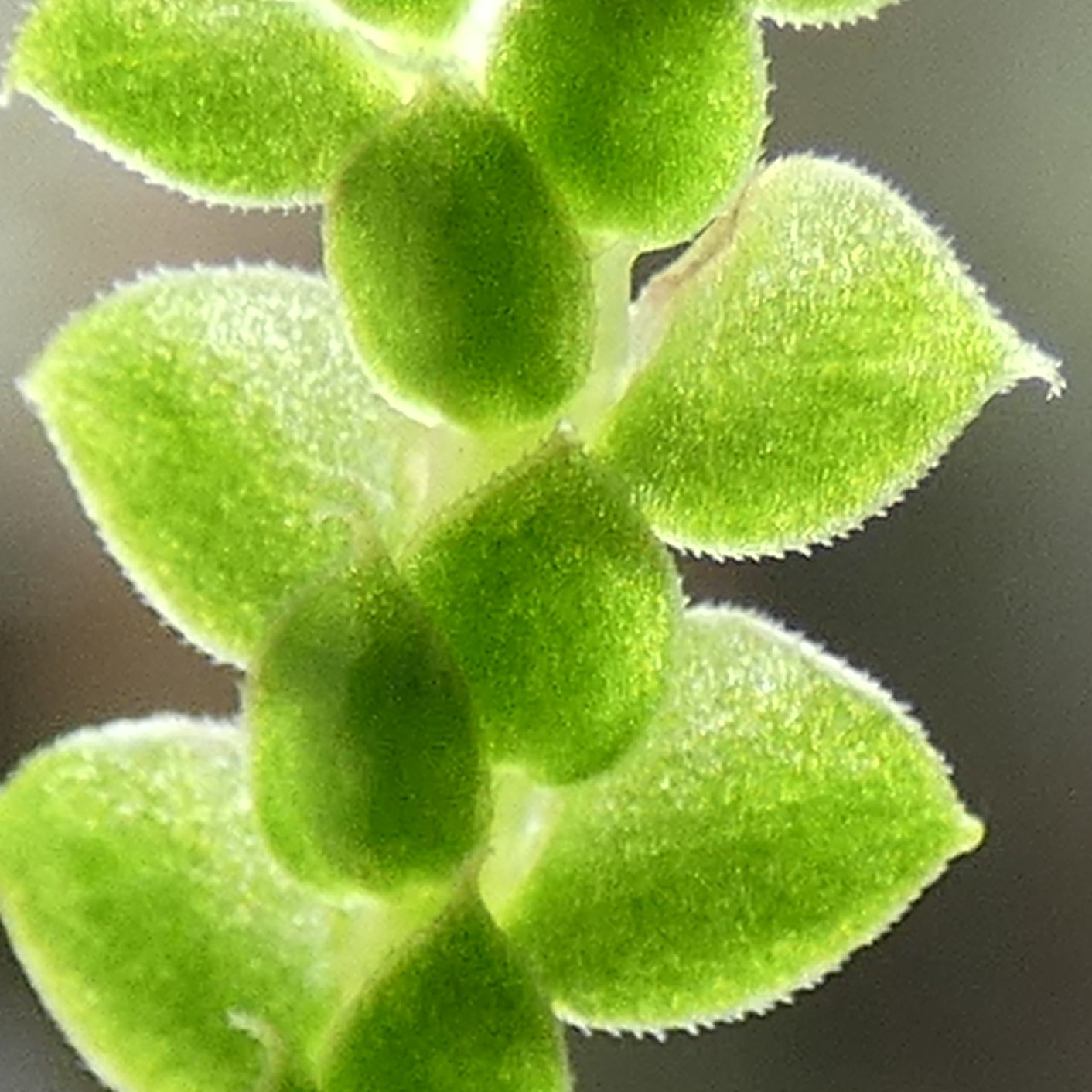
Selaginella denticulata from Antalya in Turkey

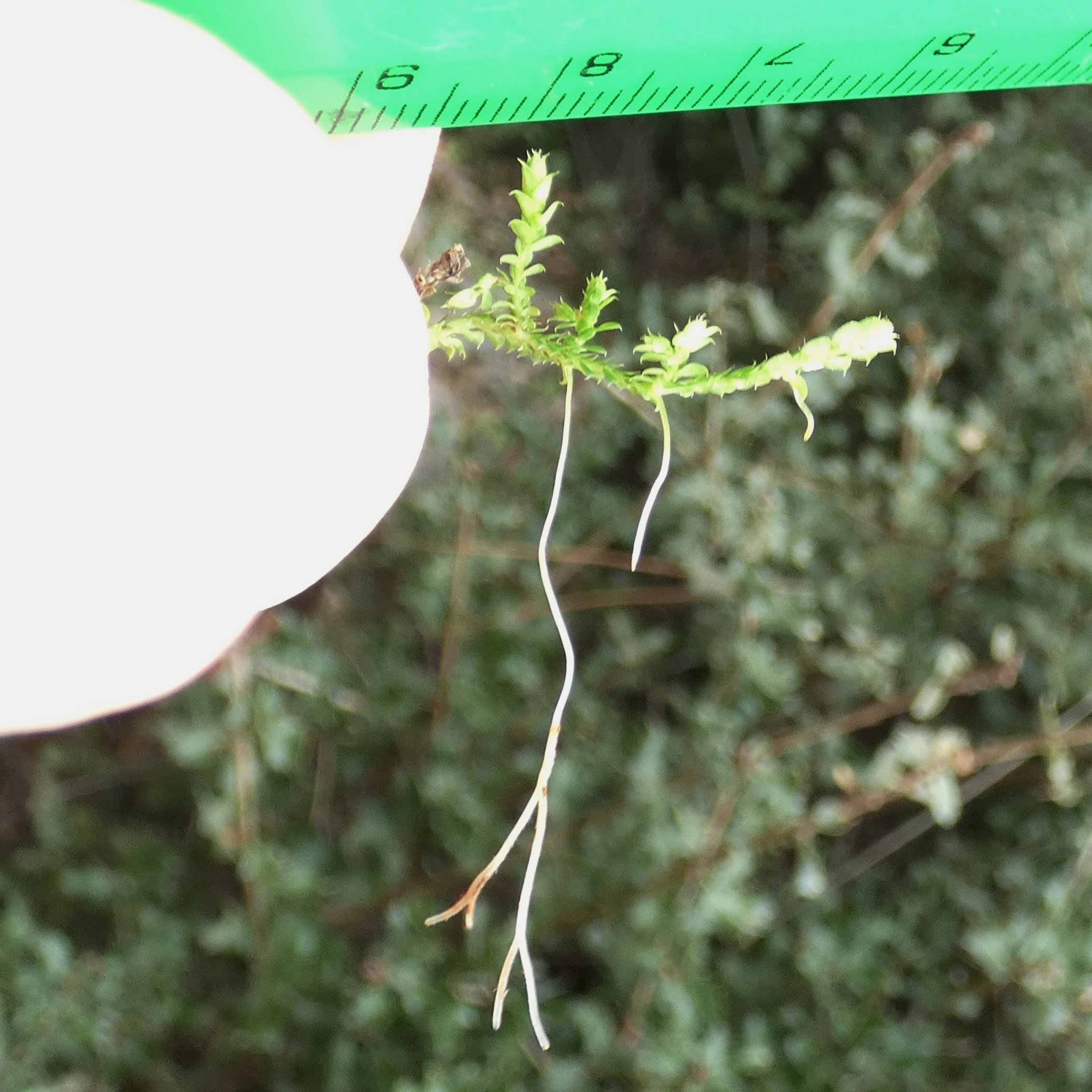
Selaginella denticulata from Antalya in Turkey

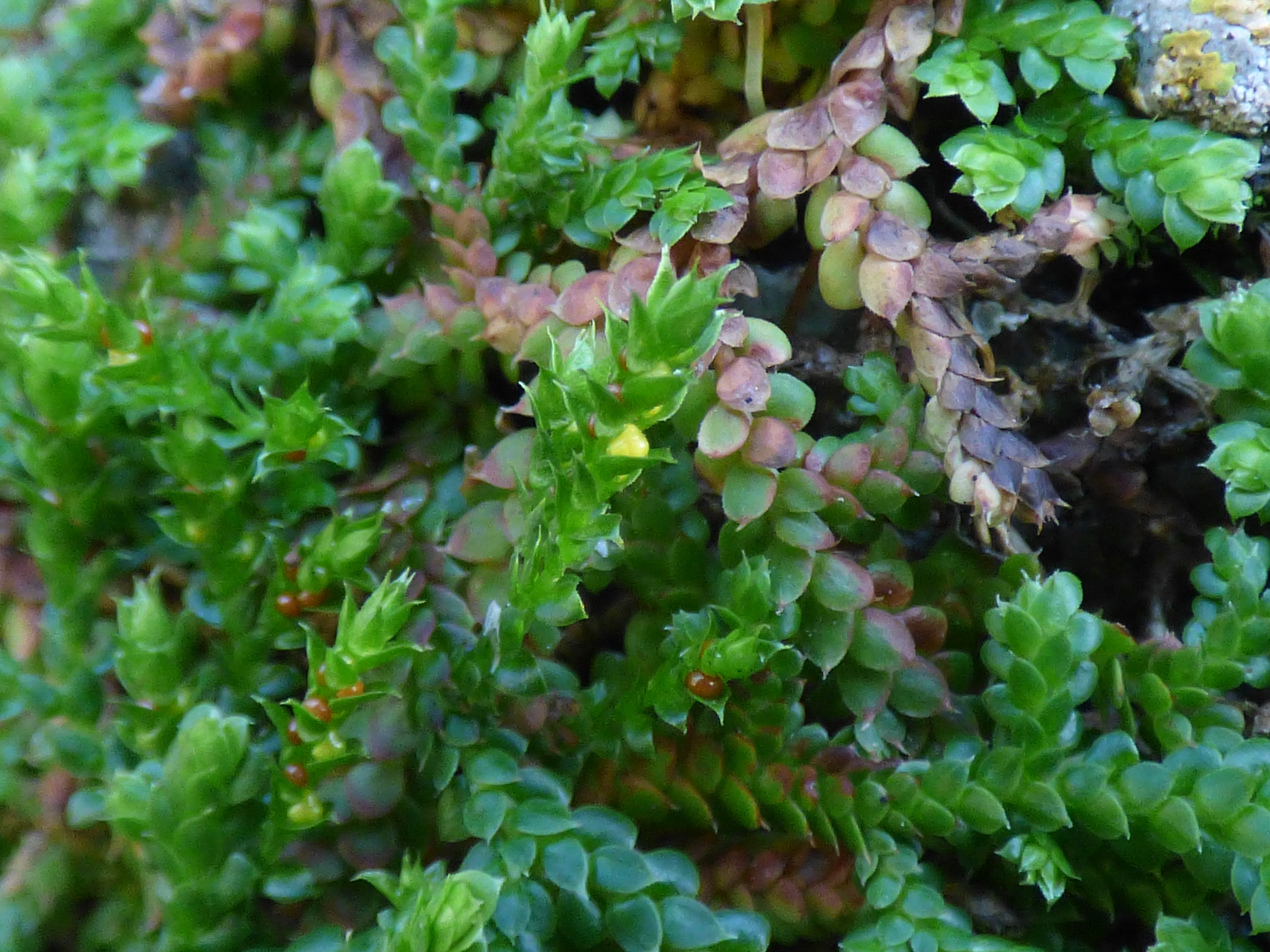
Selaginella denticulata from Antalya in Turkey

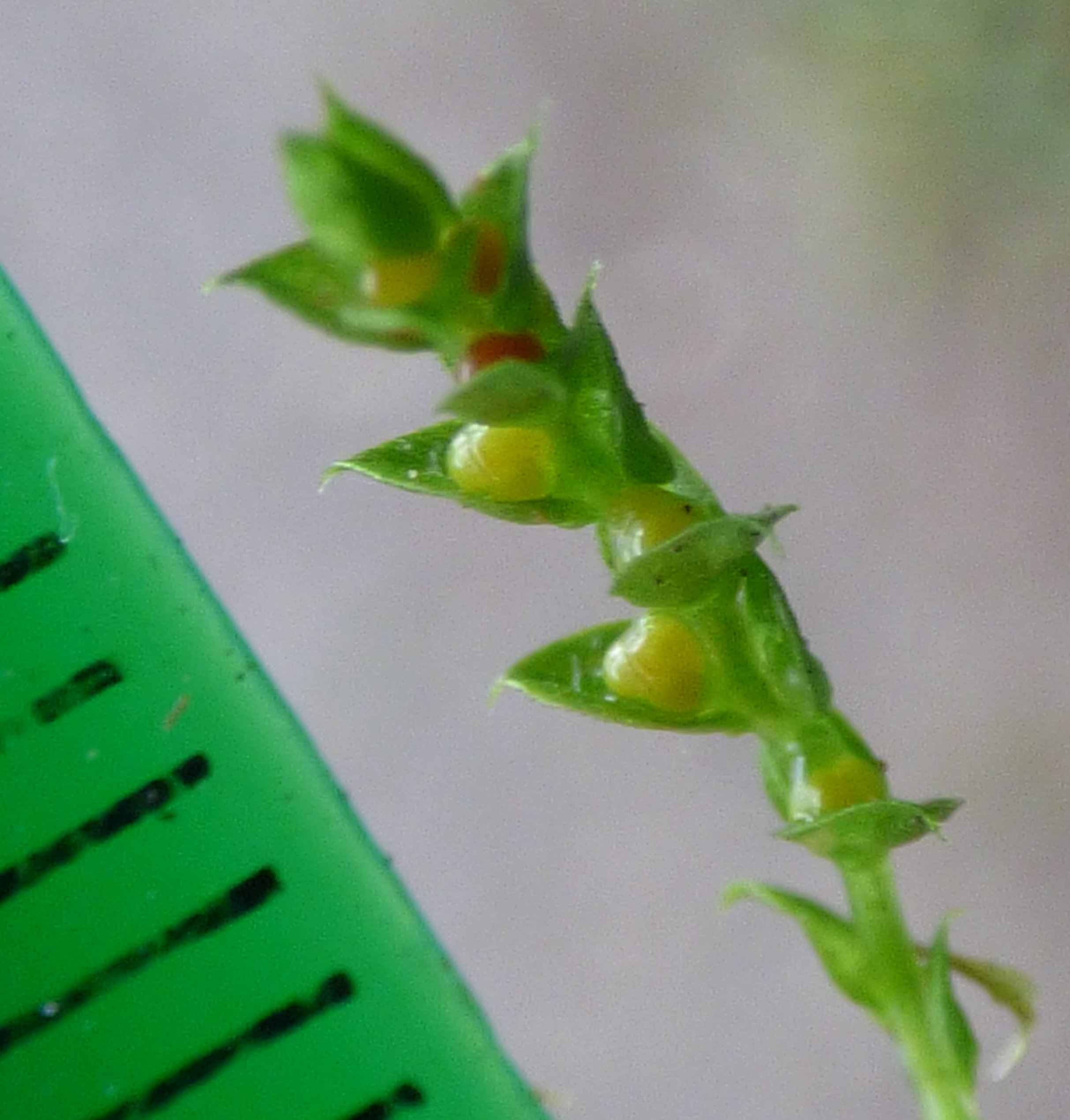
Selaginella denticulata from Antalya in Turkey

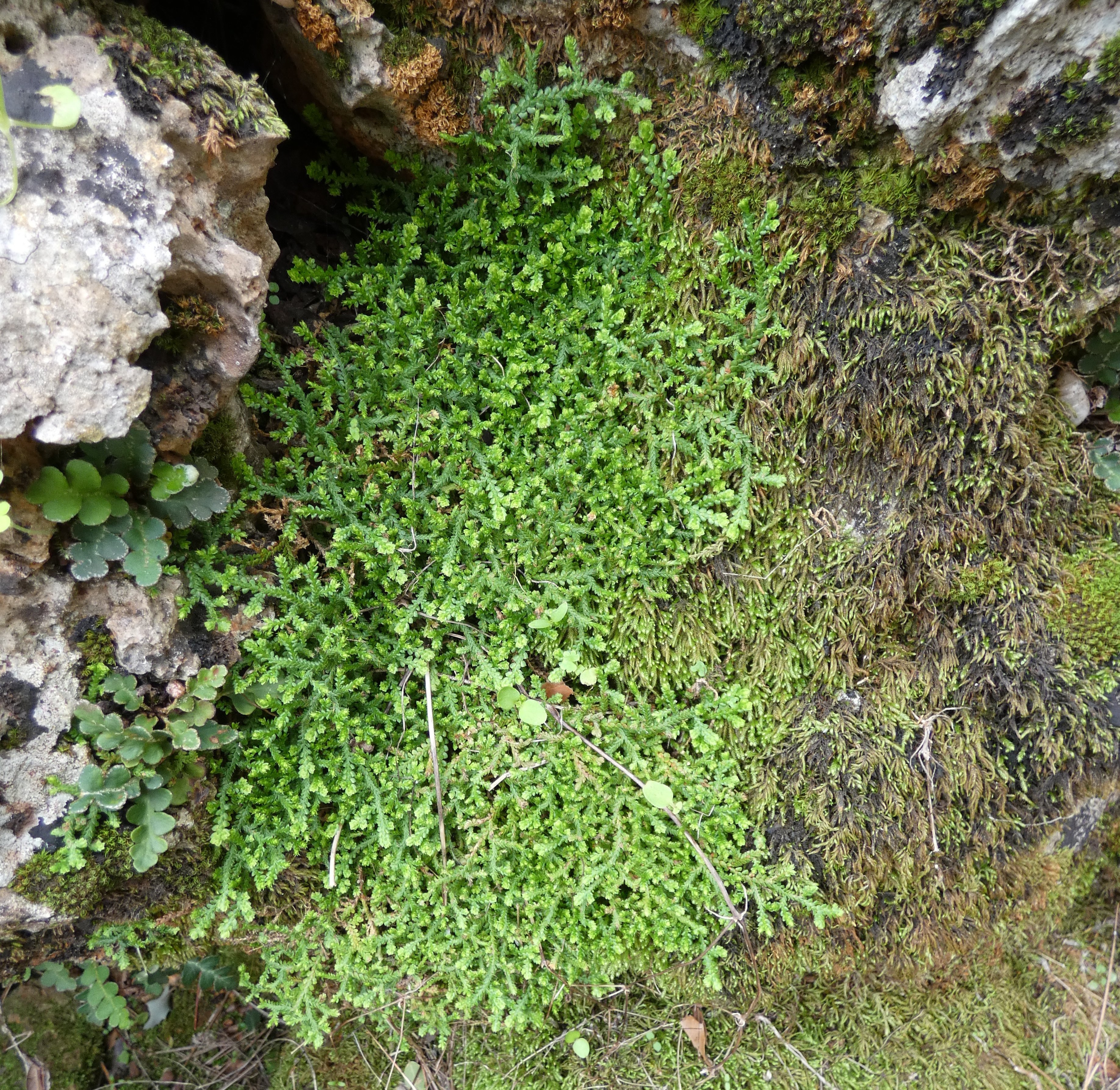
Selaginella denticulata from Antalya in Turkey

Selaginella denticulata, or Mediterranean clubmoss, is a non-flowering plant of the spikemoss genus Selaginella with a wide distribution around the Northern Hemisphere.

== Distribution and habitat ==
S. denticulata is widespread across the Mediterranean basin and can be found in Albania, Algeria, Bosnia and Herzegovina, Croatia, Cyprus, France (mainland France and Corsica), Greece (mainland Greece, several Aegean Islands, and Crete), Italy (mainland Italy, Sardinia, and Sicily), Lebanon, Malta, Montenegro, Morocco, Portugal (mainland Portugal and Madeira), Slovenia, Spain (mainland Spain and the Balearic Islands), Tunisia, and Turkey. It is most abundant in the western Mediterranean basin, becoming rarer in the east.

== Description ==
S. denticulata is a small, moss-like plant that grows along the ground. The stems branch out dichotomously, and the leaves are arranged in four rows along the stems. The sporangia are borne near the tips of the branches, with male sporangia being red and female sporangia being green.
