= Quercus look =

Conservation status
- Endangered (IUCN 3.1)

Scientific classification
- Kingdom: Plantae
- Clade: Embryophytes
- Clade: Tracheophytes
- Clade: Spermatophytes
- Clade: Angiosperms
- Clade: Eudicots
- Clade: Rosids
- Order: Fagales
- Family: Fagaceae
- Genus: Quercus
- Subgenus: Quercus subg. Cerris
- Section: Quercus sect. Cerris
- Species: Q. look

Binomial name
- Quercus look Kotschy

Synonyms
- Quercus aegilops subsp. look (Kotschy) A.Camus; Quercus brantii subsp. look (Kotschy) Mouterde

Species of flowering plant

Quercus look, the look oak or Mount Hermon oak, is a species of oak in subgenus Cerris, section Cerris, native to the Levant region of Western Asia, including northern Israel, Lebanon, and Syria. Of the local oak species, it prefers to grow at the highest altitudes, for instance at c. 1800 m on Mount Hermon.

== Description ==
Quercus look is a small-medium deciduous oak, ranging in height from 10–15 m (33–49 ft). The leaves are long and shiny, with toothed edges. Leaf sizes range 5–11 cm (2.0–4.3 in). The acorns are large, with a tip that is slightly concave or flat. The acorn's cup covers about two-thirds of the nut.

== Distribution and ecology ==
Quercus look is the southernmost representative of mountainous deciduous oaks in the Middle East, occurring in mountain ranges of the Levant, Mount Hermon in particular. It grows at altitudes between 1,400 and 1,900 m (4,600 and 6,200 ft) in mixed stands with fellow sect. Cerris species Tabor oak (Quercus ithaburensis) and Lebanon oak (Quercus libani) as well as the Lebanon cedar (Cedrus libani), the Aleppo oak (Quercus infectoria), the Balkan maple (Acer hyrcanum subsp. tauricolum), Montpellier maple (Acer monspessulanum subsp. microphyllum), styrax (Styrax officinalis), Syrian pear (Pyrus syriaca), azarole (Crataegus azarolus) and several Sorbus species.

== Taxonomy ==
The species was originally described by Theodor Kotschy in 1860, who gave it the botanical name look, based on the name the locals from Rashaya used for the tree. Thereafter, the tree was identified either as a hybrid between the co-occurring Quercus libani and Quercus ithaburensis or as a subspecies of the latter. It was not until 2017 that the tree was identified as distinct from either of these species, a status that was genetically confirmed in 2018. This reassessment also revealed a close affinity between Quercus look and Quercus cerris, the Turkey oak.
