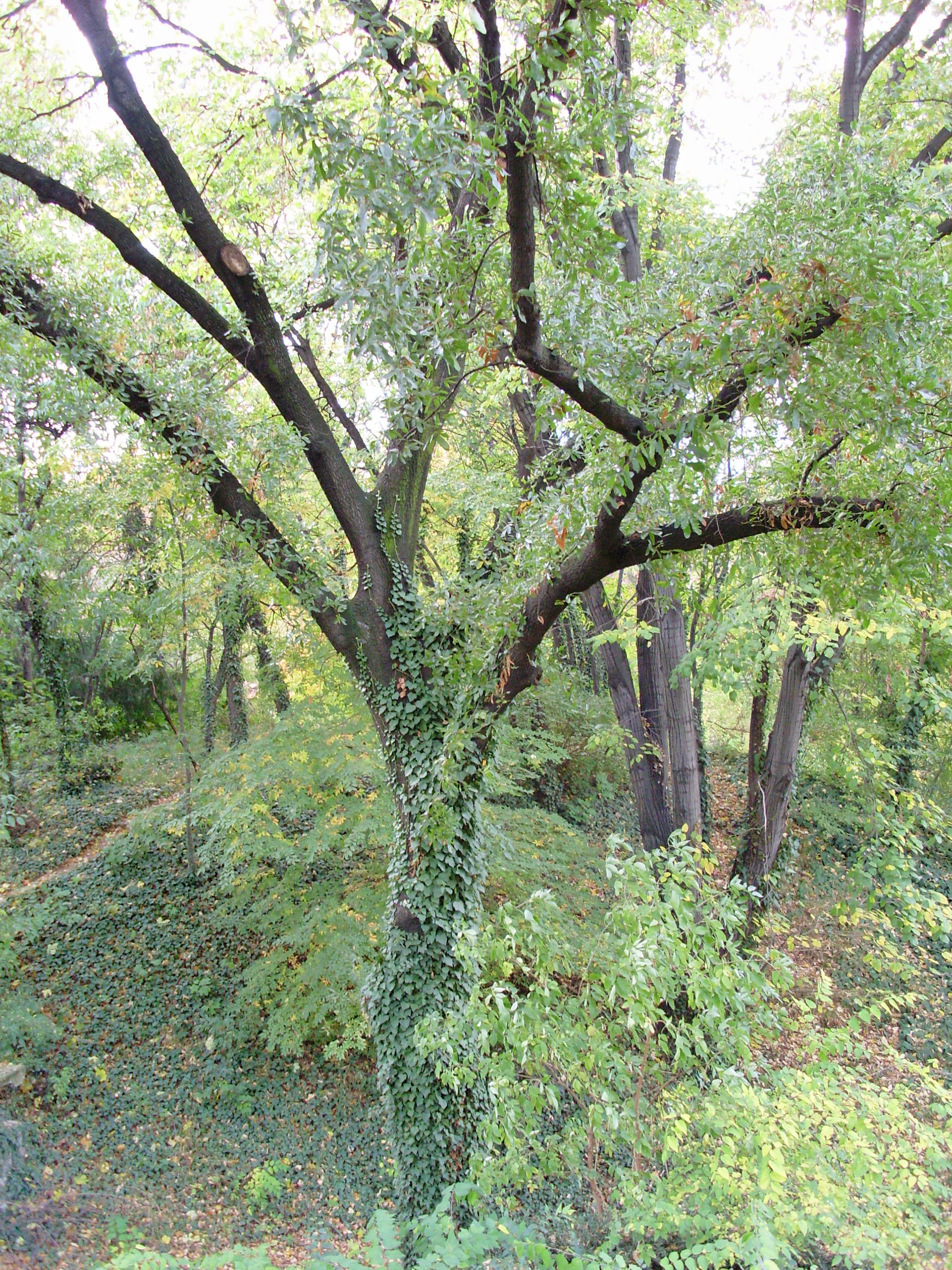

Conservation status
- Least Concern (IUCN 3.1)

Scientific classification
- Kingdom: Plantae
- Clade: Tracheophytes
- Clade: Angiosperms
- Clade: Eudicots
- Clade: Rosids
- Order: Fagales
- Family: Fagaceae
- Genus: Quercus
- Subgenus: Quercus subg. Cerris
- Section: Quercus sect. Cerris
- Species: Q. trojana

Binomial name
- Quercus trojana Webb
- Distribution map

Synonyms
- List: Quercus aegilops Griseb.; Quercus castaniifolia Pantan.; Quercus fragnus A.Longo; Quercus grisebachii Kotschy, Mattei & Bald.; Quercus macedonica A.DC.; Quercus muzaura Balsamaki; Quercus ostryifolia Borbás; Quercus euboica Papaioann.

= Quercus trojana =

Macedonian oak

Species of oak tree

Quercus trojana, the Macedonian oak, is a species of plant in the oak and beech family (Fagaceae). It is native to southeast Europe and southwest Asia, and is placed in the Turkey oak section (Quercus sect. Cerris).

== Description ==
Quercus trojana is a small to medium-sized tree reaching 10–20 metres (33–66 feet) tall. It is late deciduous to semi-evergreen, with glossy green to grey-green leaves 3–10 centimetres (1 1/4–4 inches) long and 1.5–4 cm broad, coarsely serrated at the margins and with sharply pointed teeth. The acorns are 2–4 cm long when mature (about 18 months after pollination) with a scaly acorn cup.

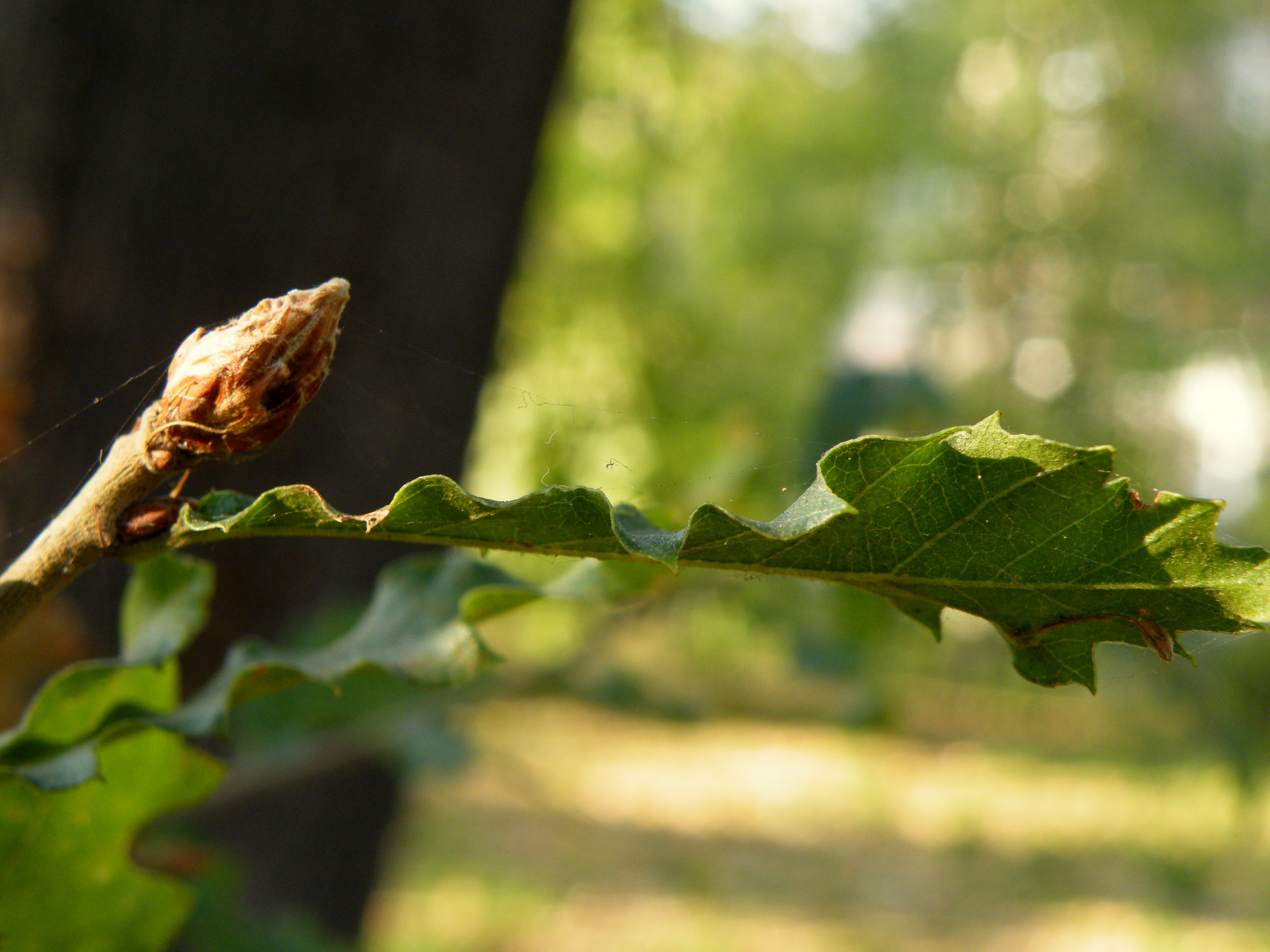
Shoot with leaves and buds

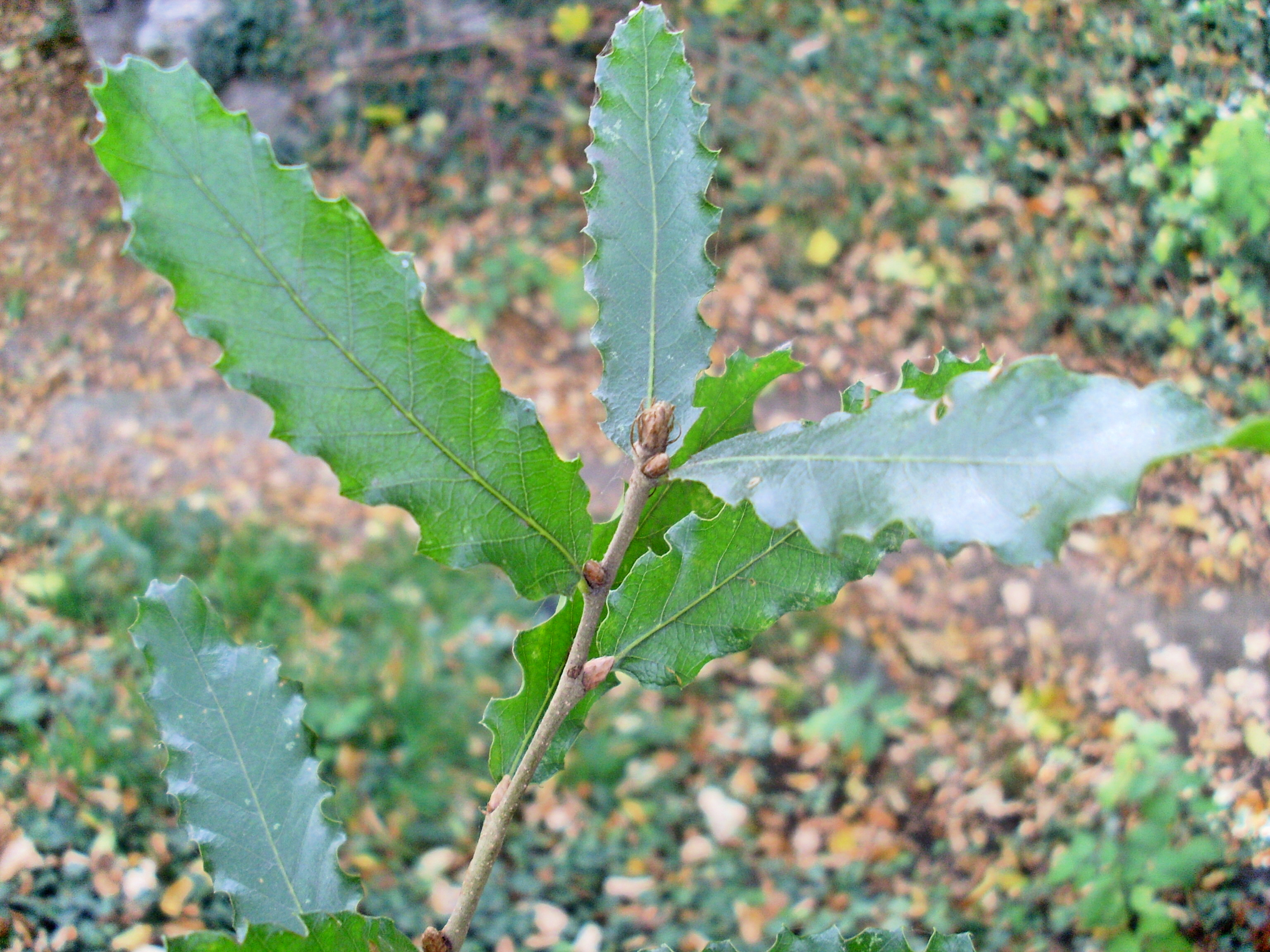
Shoot with leaves

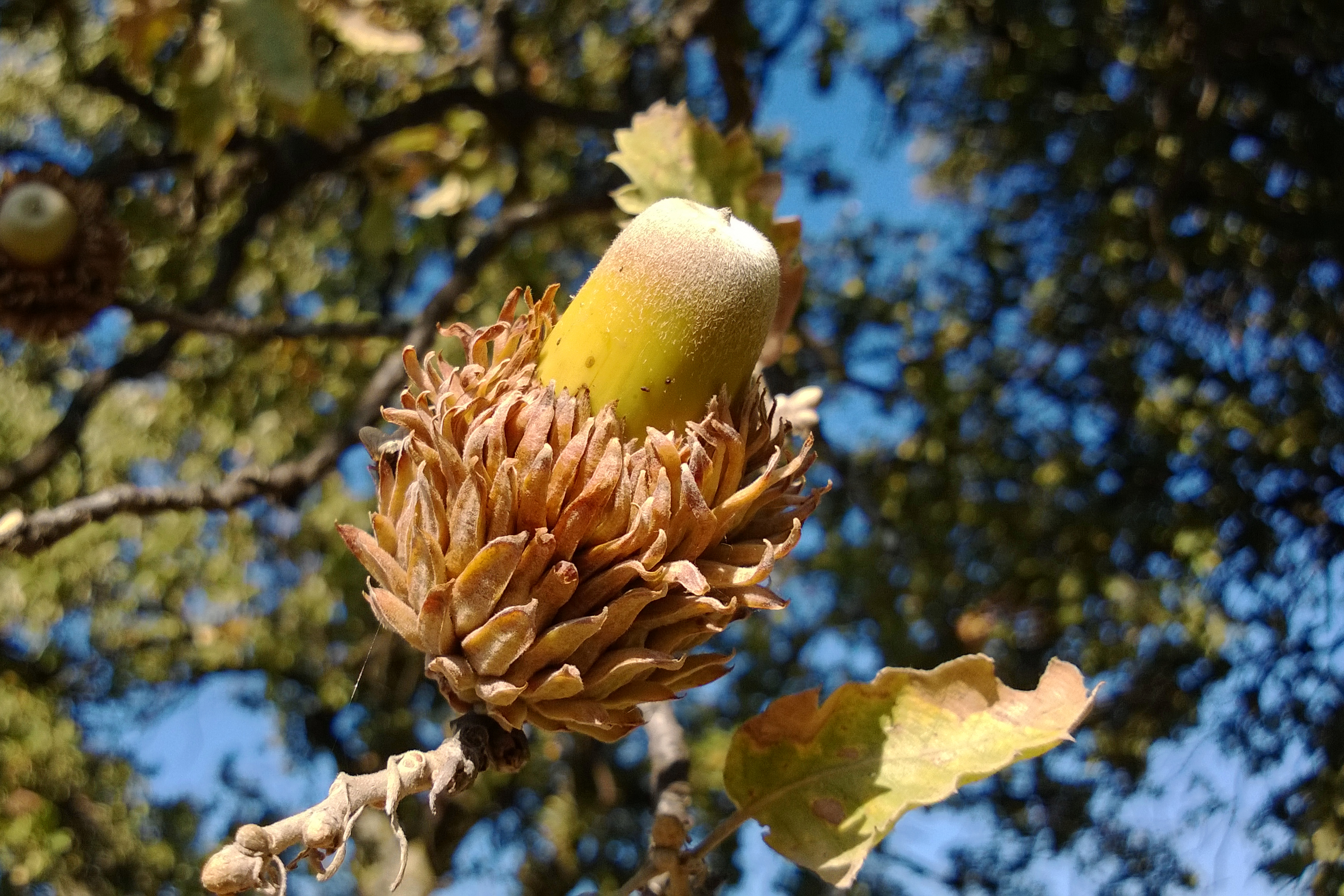
Ripe Acorn

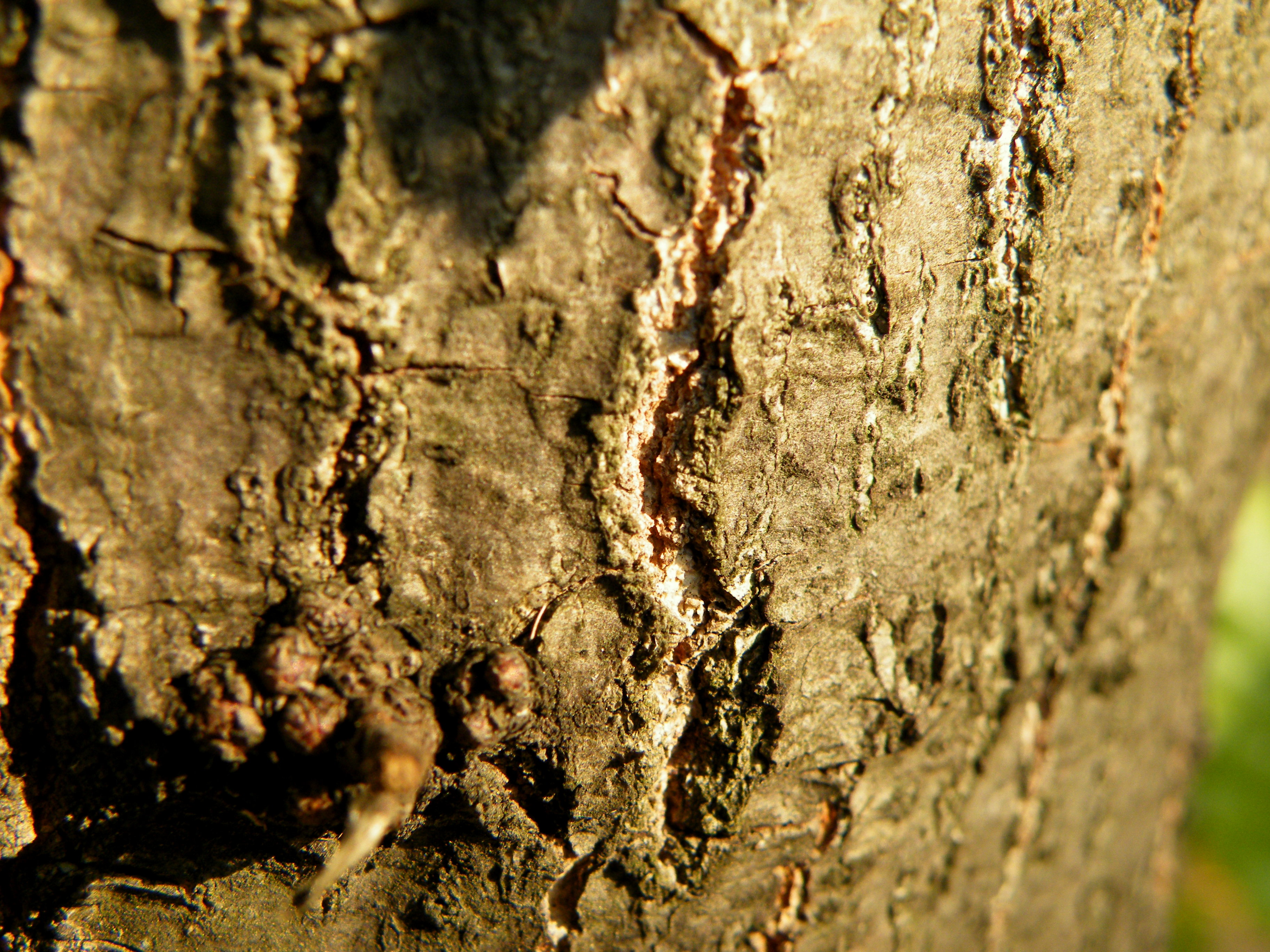
Bark

== Taxonomy ==
Quercus trojana was first described by P.B. Webb from the Troad, in 1839. Three well-differentiated subspecies are known, two of which are highly endemic.

- Quercus trojana subsp. trojana.
- Quercus trojana subsp. euboica (Papaioannou) K.I.Chr: Native to Euboea. Possibly a distinct species, in this case Quercus euboica.
- Quercus trojana subsp. yaltirikii Ziel., Petrova & D.Tomasz: Endemic to southern Anatolia.

Alongside Quercus libani, which replaces it further east in the Levant and the Zagros Mountains, and Q. afares, which is endemic to Algeria, Q. trojana is classified in the subsect. Libani within sect. Cerris.

== Distribution and habitat ==
The species is distributed from southern Italy east across the southern Balkans (Croatia, Albania, Serbia, North Macedonia and Greece) to western Turkey. Its range is disjunct, with its two main centres in the western Balkans and northwest Anatolia. It grows at low to moderate elevations (up to 1,550 metres or 5,090 feet in the south of the range in southwestern Turkey), and prefers warm, dry localities.

=== Fossil record ===
Fossils of Quercus trojana have been described from the fossil flora of Kızılcahamam district in Turkey, which is of early Pliocene age.

== Cultivation ==
It is grown as an ornamental tree in Britain, Belgium, Spain, and elsewhere, and has proved very tolerant of both drought and winter cold. A semi-fastigiate cultivar 'Iturraran Trinkoa' has been selected at the Iturraran Botanical Garden in the Basque region of Spain.
