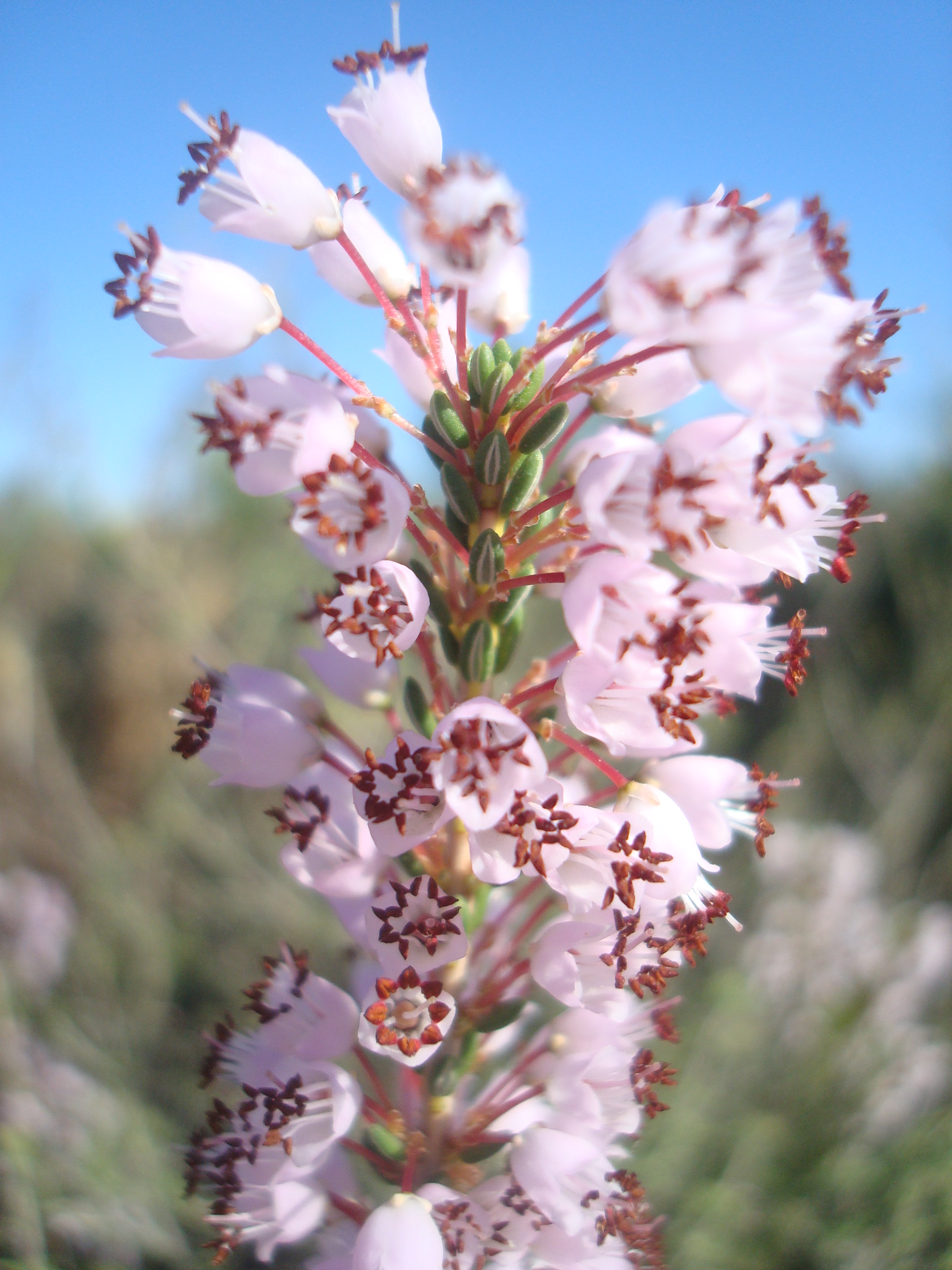

Scientific classification
- Kingdom: Plantae
- Clade: Embryophytes
- Clade: Tracheophytes
- Clade: Spermatophytes
- Clade: Angiosperms
- Clade: Eudicots
- Clade: Asterids
- Order: Ericales
- Family: Ericaceae
- Genus: Erica
- Species: E. manipuliflora

Binomial name
- Erica manipuliflora Salisb.

Synonyms
- Erica anthura Link; Erica forskalii Vitman; Erica manipuliflora f. albiflora D.C.McClint.; Erica manipuliflora subsp. anthura (Link) D.C.McClint.; Erica naematodes Link ex Nyman; Erica verticillata Forssk.

= Erica manipuliflora =

Species of flowering plant

Erica manipuliflora is a plant belonging to the genus Erica. The plant is native to Albania, Bosnia and Herzegovina, Croatia, Cyprus, East Thrace, Greece, Italy, Lebanon, Montenegro, North Macedonia, Serbia, Slovenia, Turkey and Syria.
