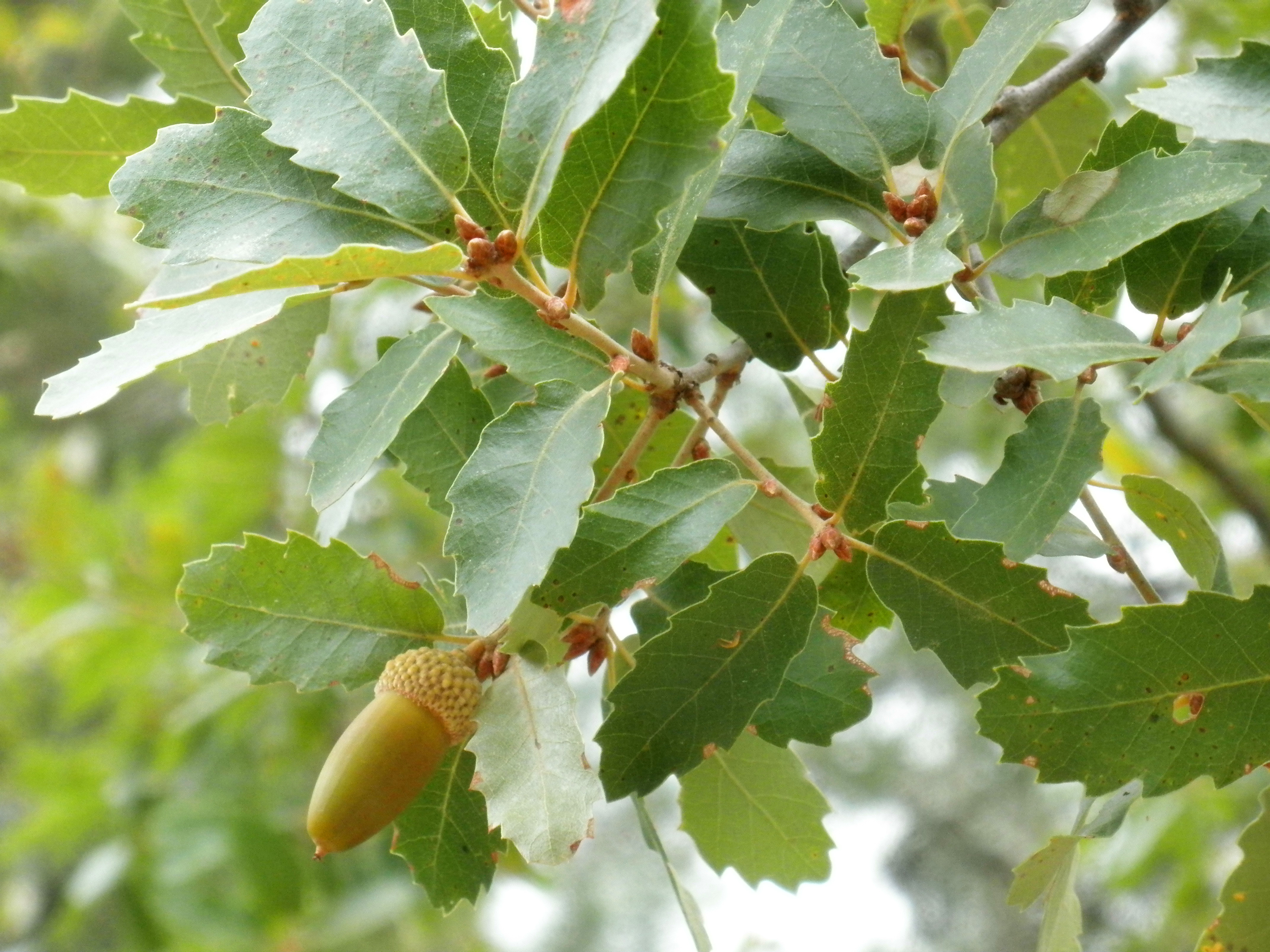

Conservation status
- Data Deficient (IUCN 3.1)

Scientific classification
- Kingdom: Plantae
- Clade: Embryophytes
- Clade: Tracheophytes
- Clade: Spermatophytes
- Clade: Angiosperms
- Clade: Eudicots
- Clade: Rosids
- Order: Fagales
- Family: Fagaceae
- Genus: Quercus
- Subgenus: Quercus subg. Quercus
- Section: Quercus sect. Quercus
- Species: Q. canariensis

Binomial name
- Quercus canariensis Willd.
- Distribution map

Synonyms
- List: Quercus baetica (Webb) Villar; Quercus carpinifolia Sennen; Quercus corymbifolia Ehrenb. ex Boiss.; Quercus cypri Kotschy ex A.DC.; Quercus esculenta K.Koch; Quercus gibraltarica K.Koch; Quercus mirbeckii Durieu; Quercus nordafricana Villar; Quercus salzmanniana (Webb) Cout.

= Quercus canariensis =

Algerian oak

Species of oak tree

Quercus canariensis, the Algerian oak, Mirbeck's oak or zean oak, is an oak native to southern Portugal, Spain, Tunisia, Algeria and Morocco. Despite the scientific name, it does not occur naturally today in the Canary Islands. It is placed in section Quercus.

== Description ==
Quercus canariensis is a medium-sized deciduous to semi-evergreen tree growing to 20–30 metres (66–98 feet) tall with a trunk up to 1.5 m (5 ft) in diameter. The leaves are 10–15 centimetres (4–6 inches) long and 6–8 cm broad, with 6–12 pairs of shallow lobes. The flowers are catkins; the fruit is an acorn 2.5 cm long and 2 cm broad, in a shallow cup.

The tree is a recipient of the Royal Horticultural Society's Award of Garden Merit.

== Landmark specimens ==
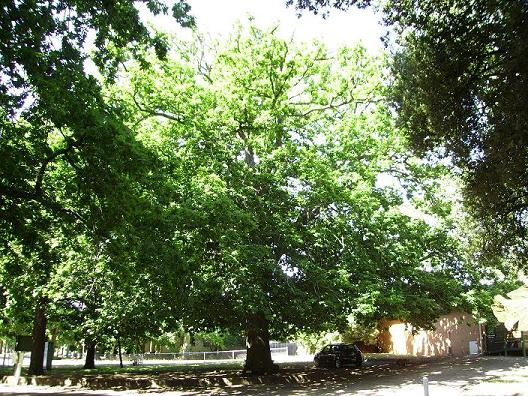
Algerian oak

Grand old Algerian oak tree was planted on 19 May 1863. It resides within the Kyneton Botanical Gardens in the town of Kyneton in the Australian state of Victoria. This tree is listed by the National Trust on the Register of Significant Trees in Victoria. There are also two good specimens located in the Ballarat Botanical Gardens, one of which is believed to have been planted in 1920. There was another significant old Algerian oak tree in Victoria at the Melbourne Royal Botanic Gardens. It was known as Lady Loch's Oak; its trunk split in half in November 2007, due to the weight of its giant old limbs. The tree has been extensively planted in Canberra.

There are over a dozen mature trees in St Vincent Gardens, Albert Park, Victoria, some possibly dating back to the late 19th to early 20th century.
