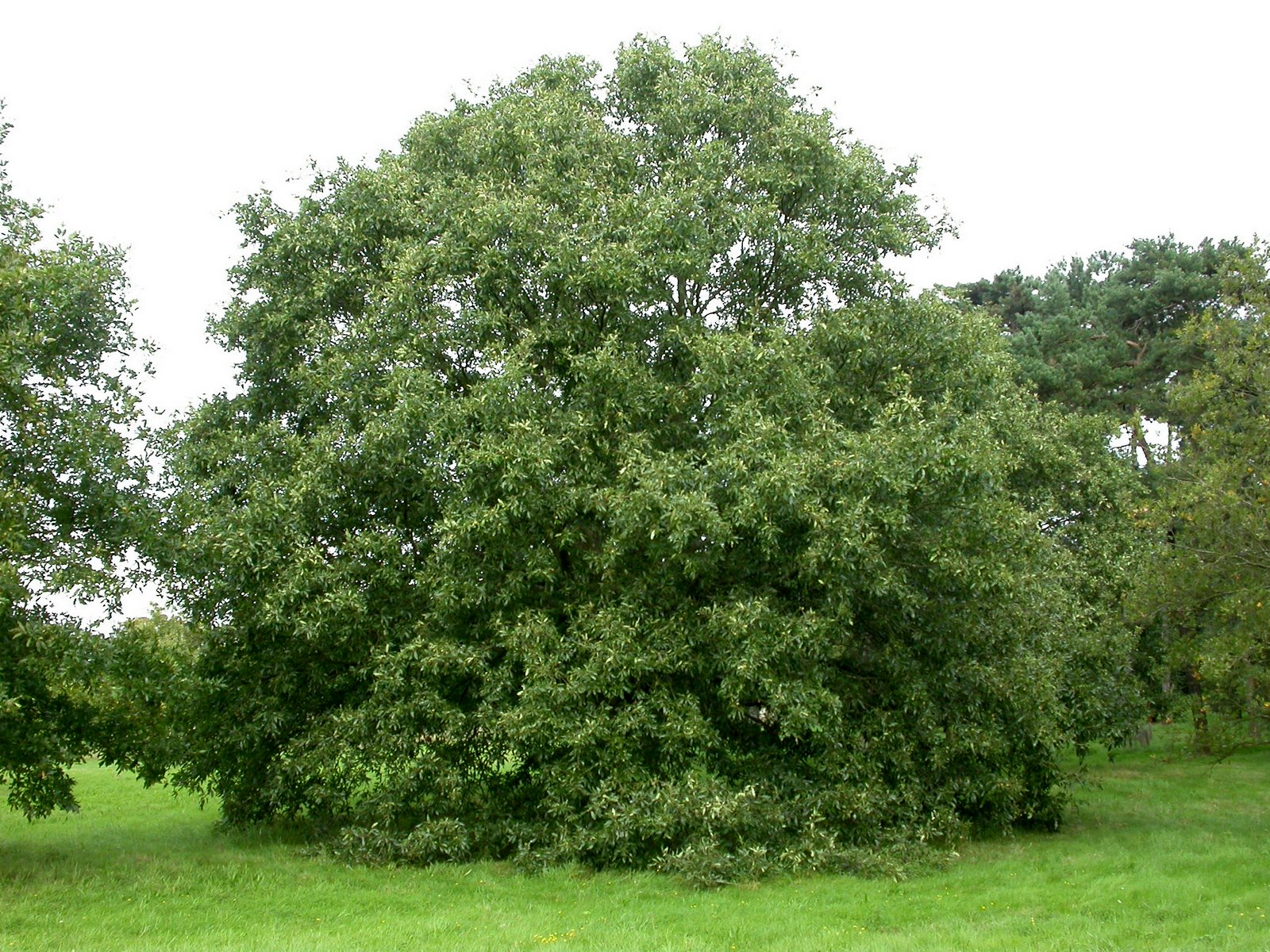

Conservation status
- Least Concern (IUCN 3.1)

Scientific classification
- Kingdom: Plantae
- Clade: Embryophytes
- Clade: Tracheophytes
- Clade: Angiosperms
- Clade: Eudicots
- Clade: Rosids
- Order: Fagales
- Family: Fagaceae
- Genus: Quercus
- Subgenus: Quercus subg. Cerris
- Section: Quercus sect. Cerris
- Species: Q. libani

Binomial name
- Quercus libani G.Olivier

Synonyms
- List: Quercus hedjazii Djav.-Khoie; Quercus irregularis Djav.-Khoie; Quercus libani var. eigii (A.Camus) Zohary; Quercus libani var. inermis Zohary; Quercus libani var. pinnata Hand.-Mazz.; Quercus libani var. regia (Lindl.) Boiss.; Quercus libani var. vesca (Kotschy) Boiss.; Quercus ovicarpa Djav.-Khoie; Quercus polynervata Djav.-Khoie; Quercus regia Lindl.; Quercus regia var. eigii A.Camus; Quercus serratifolia Benth. ex G.Kirchn.; Quercus squarrosa Kotschy ex A.DC.; Quercus subcordata Djav.-Khoie; Quercus tchihatchewii Kotschy ex A.DC.; Quercus tchihatchewii Kotschy; Quercus tregubovii Djav.-Khoie; Quercus vesca Kotschy

= Quercus libani =

Lebanon oak

Species of plant

Quercus libani, the Lebanon oak, is a species of oak native to the eastern Mediterranean in western Asia, including in western Syria, Lebanon, eastern Turkey, and northern Iraq and Iran.

== Description ==
Quercus libani is a deciduous tree growing to 8 metres (26 feet). The deciduous leaf is slender, elongated and often asymmetrical, its base is round, and its tip is slightly pointed. In the adult state the leaf's upper side is dark green and the underside is pale green.

The flowers are monoecious, meaning that flowers from both sexes can be found on the same tree. They are pollinated by wind. The tree produces acorns that grow to about 2 to 3.6 centimetres (3/4 to 1 3/8 inches) in diameter. Its length is half covered by the cupule.

== Habitat ==
The Lebanon oak can grow in medium loamy to heavy clay soils, with no preference to soil acidity. The tree can grow in direct sunlight to semi-shade. It can endure strong winds, but not salty maritime exposures.

== Cultivation ==
=== Ornamental tree ===
Quercus libani is cultivated and planted as an ornamental tree in gardens, parks, and habitat restoration projects. It is successful in drought-tolerant landscape gardens.

The tree does not tolerate root disturbance well, therefore landscape trees should not be moved once planted, or transplanted from native habitats. Acorns sown in situ will produce the best trees, in growth rate and deep-rooted drought tolerance. The acorns are sown as they ripen. Acorns lose their viability if they dry out and so need to be kept in a moist and cool place away from rodents until planting.

=== Biological pest control ===
The leaf litter of the Lebanon oak is used as a biological pest control, herbivore insect repellent for protecting other plants. Its leaves placed as a mulch layer around vulnerable plants effectively repel snails, slugs, and grubs. Fresh leaves can inhibit plant growth and so are not used directly from the tree. Being deciduous, much beneficial leaf litter is produced in the autumn.

== Uses ==
Lebanon oak wood is very hard and resistant to insect and fungal attack and is used in construction.

=== Food ===
The acorns are very bitter due to high concentrations of tannins. This bitter taste can be leached out by washing the acorns in running water, but this causes the loss of many beneficial minerals. The acorns can be dried and ground it into a powder and used to thicken stews and may be mixed with cereals for making bread. The roasted bitter acorns may be used as a coffee substitute.

=== Medicinal ===
Galls produced by the larvae of different insects that may be found on the trees have especially high tannin concentrations, are highly astringent and were used in the treatment of haemorrhage and diarrhea. Tannin from the galls are also used as dye.

== Gallery ==
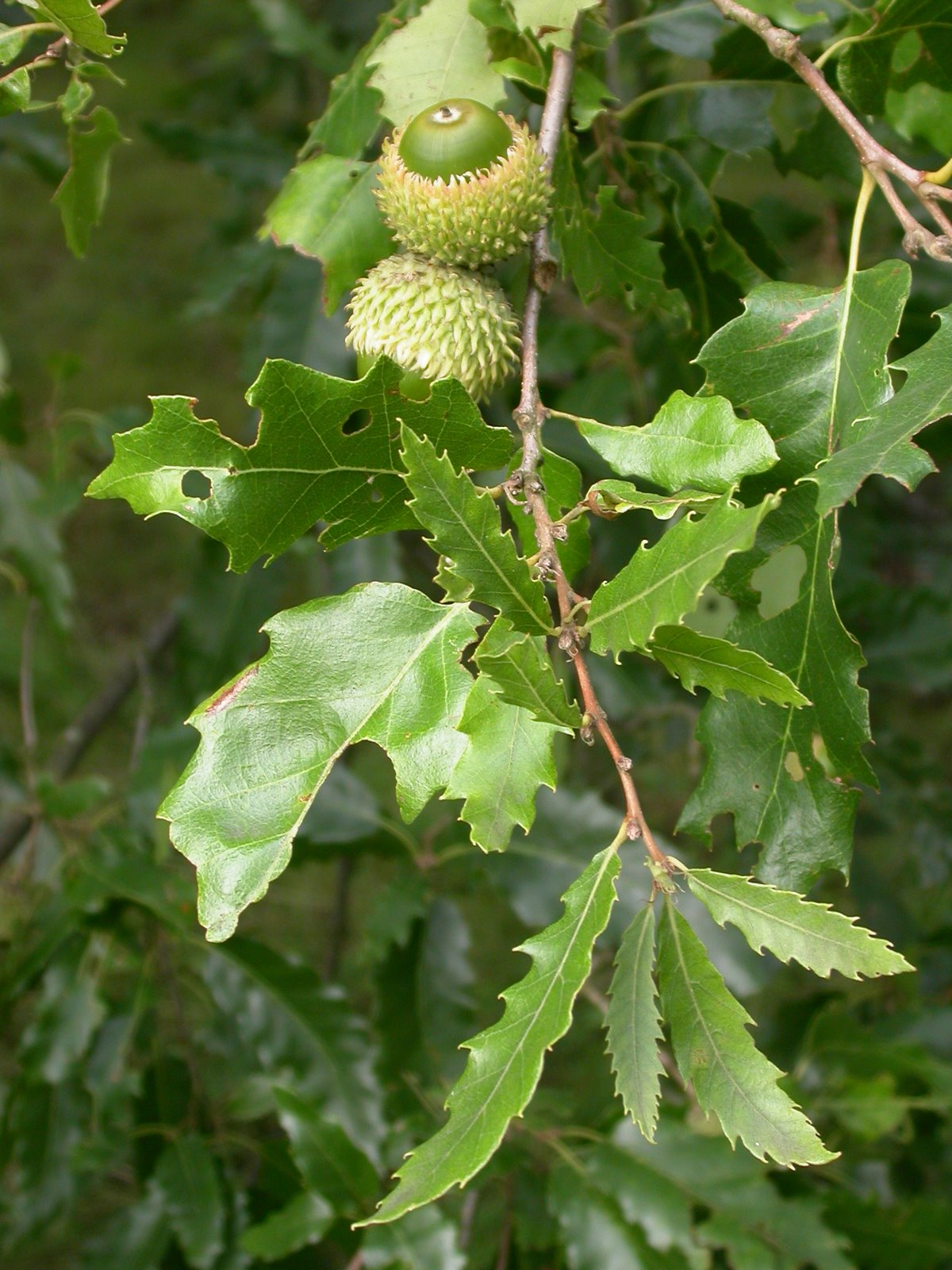
Lebanon oak leaves

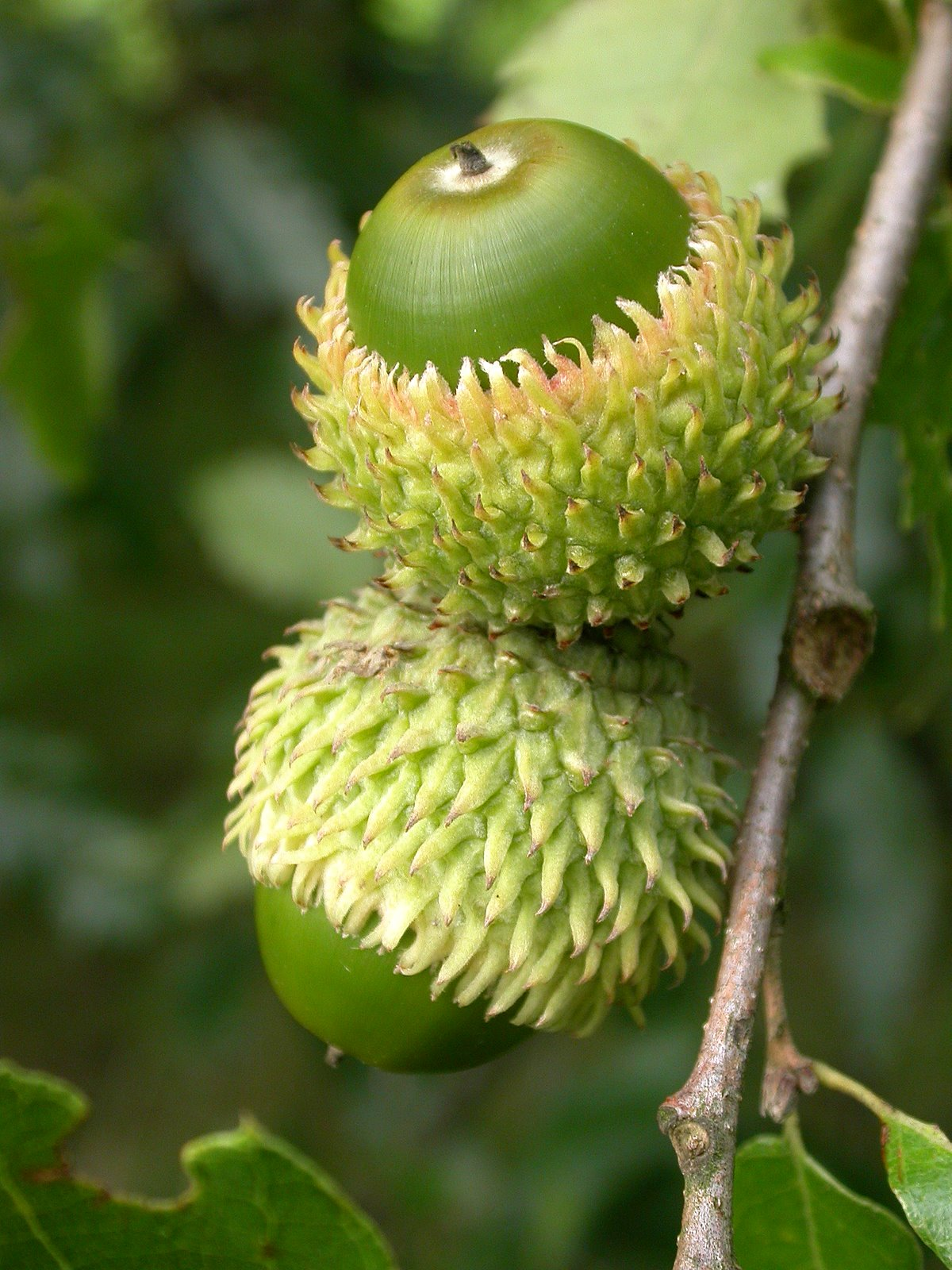
Lebanon oak's green acorns with spiny cupule

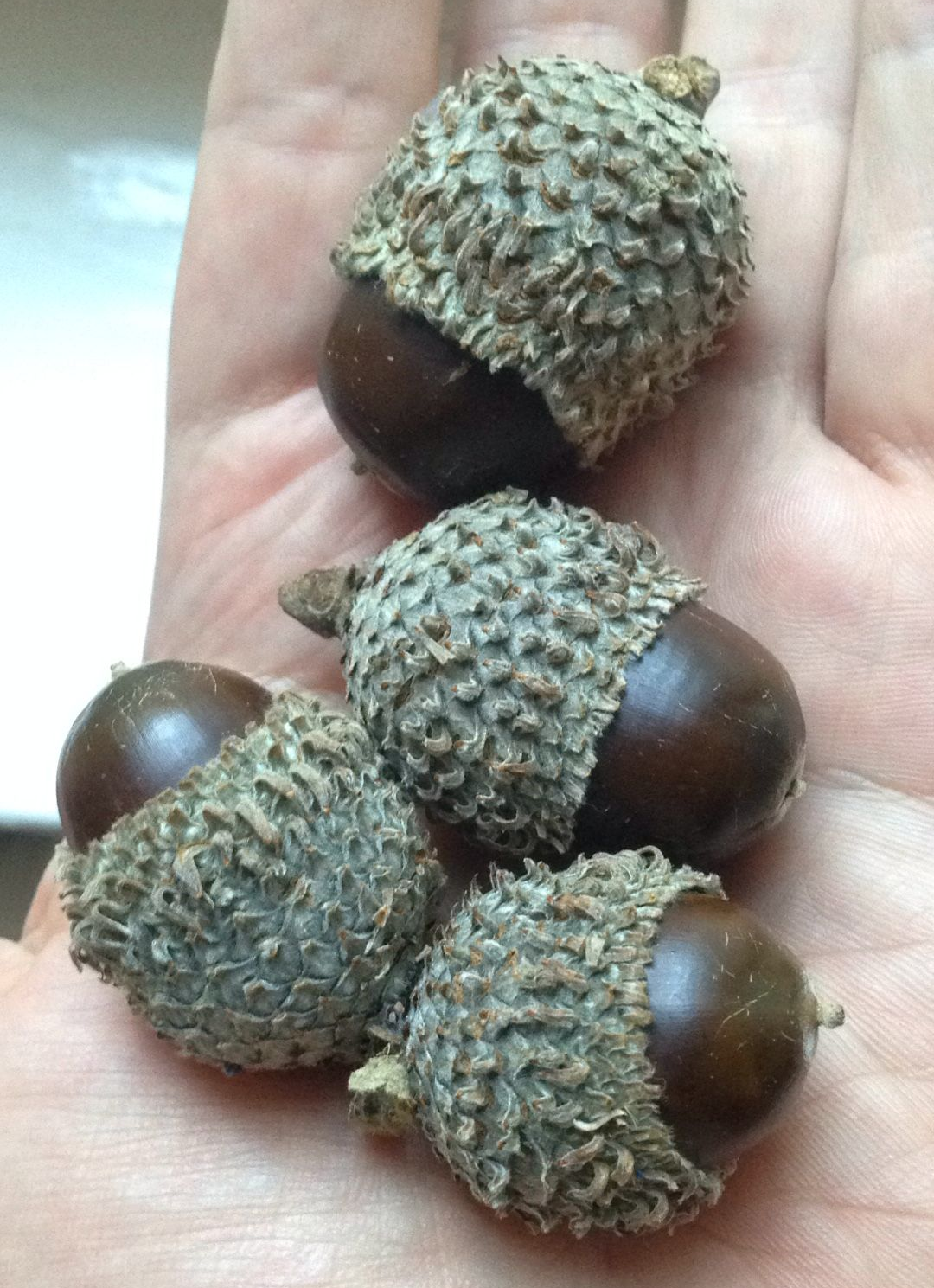
Lebanon oak's ripe acorns
