= Aïn Arnat District =

Aïn Arnat District دائرة عين أرنات
- District
- Country: Algeria
- Province: Setif Province
- County seat: Aïn Arnat

Area
  - Total: 22.57 sq mi (58.46 km^{2})

Population (2008)
  - Total: 95 384
  - Density: 400/sq mi (154/km^{2})
- Time zone: UTC+1 (CET)

The Aïn Arnat district is an Algerian administrative district in the Sétif province.

== Communes ==
The District is composed of four communes: El Ouricia, Ain Arnat, Mezloug and Aïn Abessa.

== Localisation ==
Aïn Arnat District is located in the west of Sétif province and is bordered to the north by the communes:

- commune of Sétif in Sétif District
- commune of Beni Fouda in Djémila District
- commune of Ouled Addouane in Aïn El Kébira District
- commune of Tizi N'Bechar and Amoucha in Amoucha District
- Bejaia Province
- commune of Beni Hocine and Aïn Roua in Bougaa District
- Bordj Bou Arréridj Province
- commune of Guellal in Aïn Oulmane District
- commune of Guidjel and in Guidjel District
