= Sétif District =

- District
- Country: Algeria
- Province: Setif Province
- County seat: Setif
- Time zone: UTC+1 (CET)

The Sétif district is an Algerian administrative district in the Sétif province. Its chief town is located on the eponymous town of Setif.

== Communes ==
The daira is composed of only one commune: Setif.

== Localisation ==
District borderings of the Sétif District are the communes of Guidjel and Ouled Sabor in Guidjel District, commune of Beni Fouda in Djémila District, communes of El Ouricia, Ain Arnat, Mezloug in Ain Arnat District.
