= Bouandas District =

Coordinates: 36.4947°N 5.1019°E

- District
- Country: Algeria
- Province: Sétif Province
- Time zone: UTC+1 (CET)

Bouandas District is a district of Sétif Province, Algeria.

The district is further divided into 4 municipalities:

- Aït Naoual Mezada
- Aït Tizi
- Bouandas
- Bousselam
