= Aïn Azel District =

Coordinates: 35.8433°N 5.5219°E

- District
- Country: Algeria
- Province: Sétif Province
- Time zone: UTC+1 (CET)

Aïn Azel District is a district of Sétif Province, Algeria.

== Communes ==
The District is composed of four communes: Aïn Azel, Aïn Lahdjar, Bir Hadada and Beida Bordj.
