= Bir El Arch District =

Coordinates: 36.1333°N 5.8333°E

- District
- Country: Algeria
- Province: Sétif Province
- Time zone: UTC+1 (CET)

Bir El Arch District is a district of Sétif Province, Algeria.

The district is further divided into 4 municipalities:

- Bir El Arch
- Belaa
- El Ouldja
- Tachouda
