= Béni Aziz District =

Coordinates: 36.4667°N 5.6500°E

- District
- Country: Algeria
- Province: Sétif Province
- Time zone: UTC+1 (CET)

Béni Aziz District is a district of Sétif Province, Algeria.

The district is further divided into 3 municipalities:

- Aïn Sebt
- Beni Aziz
- Maaouia
