= Salah Bey District =

Coordinates: 35.8542°N 5.2917°E

- District
- Country: Algeria
- Province: Sétif Province
- Time zone: UTC+1 (CET)

Salah Bey District is a district of Sétif Province, Algeria.

The district is further divided into 5 municipalities:

- Boutaleb
- Hamma
- Ouled Tebben
- Rasfa
- Salah Bey
