= Amoucha District =

Coordinates: 36.3880°N 5.4108°E

- District
- Country: Algeria
- Province: Sétif Province
- Time zone: UTC+1 (CET)

Amoucha District is a district of Sétif Province, Algeria.

The district is further divided into 3 municipalities:

- Amoucha
- Oued El Barad
- Tizi N'Bechar
