= Ait Yaala =

Ait Yaala Iṯ Yeɛla
- Kabyle tribe
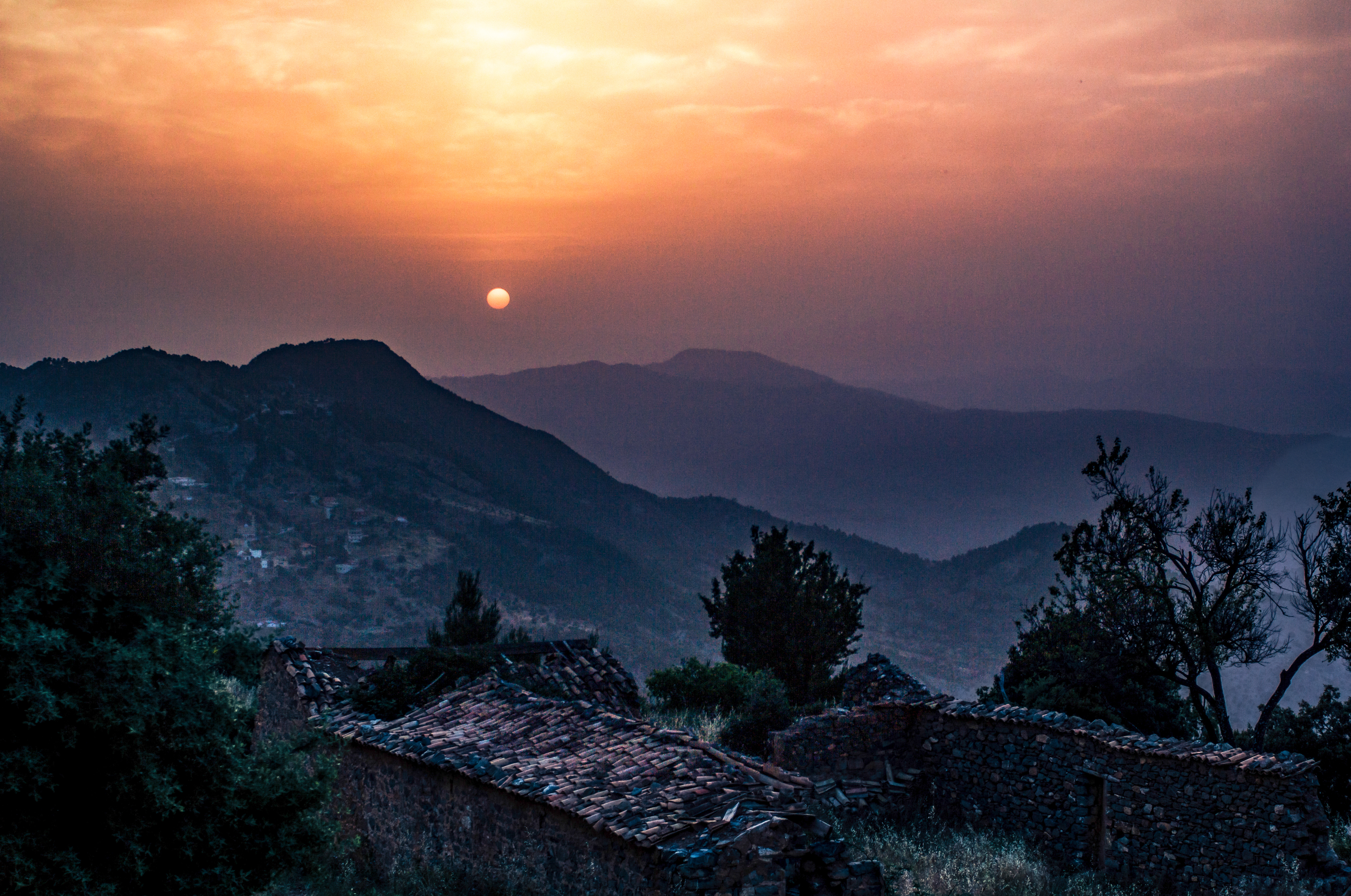
- Sunset over Guenzet
- Ethnicity: Kabyles
- Location: Babors
- Language: Kabyle
- Religion: Islam

Ait Yaala (Kabyle: Iṯ Yeɛla is a Kabyle tribe from the Babors in Algeria.

== Geography ==
The tribe is located in the north-west of the Sétif Province, in the Babor Mountains. It is limited in the west by the Bousselam river and in the east by the Mhadjer river.

== History ==
According to Mouloud Gaid, the tribe was formed when populated of the Kalâa of Ait Hammad migrated to the region after a hilalian invasion, during the 12th century.
