= El Eulma District =

Coordinates: 36.1528°N 5.6900°E

El Eulma District دائرة العلمة
- District
- Country: Algeria
- Province: Sétif Province
- Time zone: UTC+1 (CET)

El Eulma District is a district of Sétif Province, Algeria.

The district is further divided into 3 municipalities:

- Bazer Sakhra
- El Eulma
- Guelta Zerka
