= Aïn Oulmane District =

Coordinates: 35.9167°N 5.3000°E

- District
- Country: Algeria
- Province: Sétif Province
- Time zone: UTC+1 (CET)

Aïn Oulmane District is a district of Sétif Province, Algeria.

The district is further divided into 4 municipalities:

- Aïn Oulmene
- Guellal
- Ksar El Abtal
- Ouled Si Ahmed
