= Aïn Arnat =

Ain Arnat عين أرنات ⴰⵉⵏ ⴰⵔⵏⴰⵜ
- Commune and town
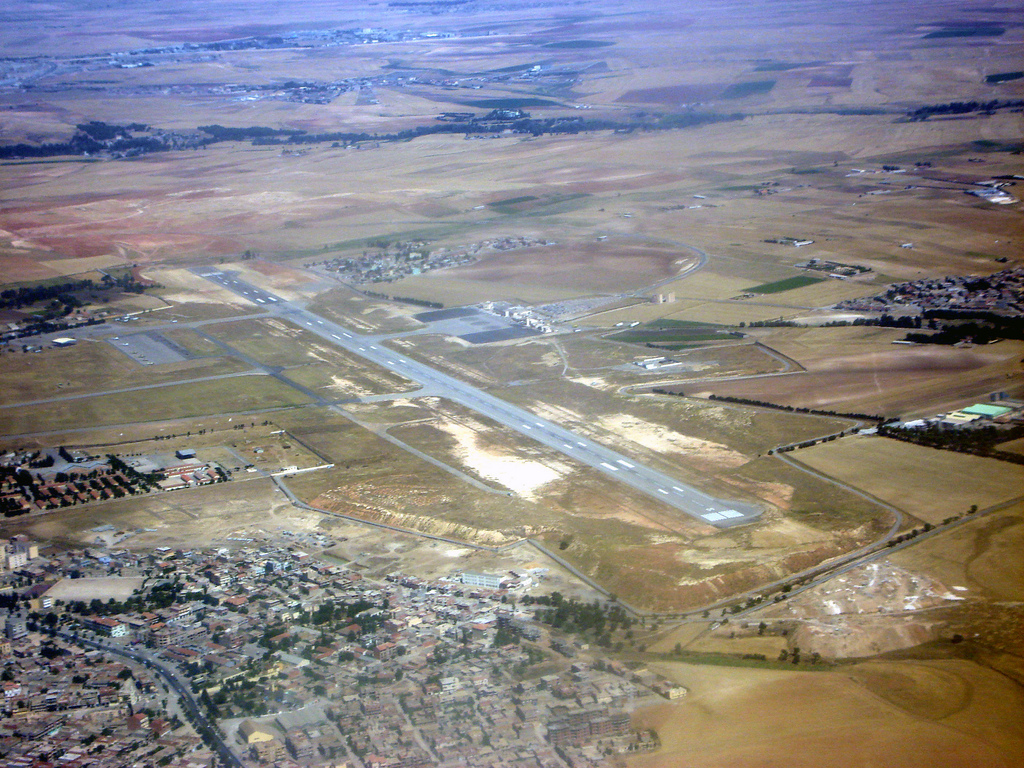
- a village in Ain arnat
- Nickname: Ain arnat
- Motto: By the people and for the people
- Location within Sétif Province

- Location within Algeria
- Coordinates: 36°11′00″N 5°19′00″E
- Country: Algeria
- Province: Sétif Province
- Established: 1853

Government
  - Mayor: Lakhder Elkolli

Area
  - Land: 7,820 sq mi (20,255 km^{2})

Population (2008)
  - Total: 43 551
  - Density: 560/sq mi (215/km^{2})
- Time zone: [[UTC+1]] (CET)
- Postal code: 19017

Aïn Arnat (in Arabic : عين أرنات) is a town and commune in Sétif Province in north-eastern Algeria.

== Geography ==
Aïn Arnat is a commune located in the High Plateaus region of northeastern Algeria, situated 7 km (4.3 mi) west of the provincial capital, Sétif, and approximately 293 km (182 mi) east of Algiers. Covering an area of 203.05 km^{2} (78.40 sq mi), the commune sits at an average elevation of roughly 1,020 m (3,350 ft) above sea level, characterized by flat to gently rolling agricultural plains typical of the Sétifian high plains.

Administratively, it serves as the chef-lieu (seat) of the Aïn Arnat District, which encompasses four communes: Aïn Arnat, Aïn Abessa, El Ouricia, and Mezloug. The municipality is bordered by Aïn Abessa to the north, Mezloug to the south, Sétif to the east, and the communes of Bir Kasdali and Khelil (in Bordj Bou Arréridj Province) to the west. The local hydrography is marked by seasonal wadis, notably Oued Boussellam, which drains the surrounding plain.

== Education ==
Aïn Arnat district has two high schools and four middle schools, And more than 12 Primary schools People who graduate mostly go afterwards to University Ferhat Abbas or University Mohamed Lamine Debaghine in Setif.

== Climate ==
Ain arnat has a Dry Mediterranean climate (Köppen climate classification Csa), its summer is hot and dry, whilst its winter is cool and moist.

due to its location on the High Plateaus at an elevation of 1,096 metres (3,596 ft), it is one of the coldest regions during winter in Algeria.It frequently sees an annual snowfall of up to 40 centimetres (16 in). Flash floods are rare but have recently occurred around the spring and fall seasons. The summer is fairly hot where extreme heat waves are common around the month of July where temperatures can sometimes even reach 40 °C (104 °F).

Climate data for Ain arnat
Month	Jan	Feb	Mar	Apr	May	Jun	Jul	Aug	Sep	Oct	Nov	Dec	Year
Record high °C (°F)	21.5 (70.7)	21.6 (70.9)	28.0 (82.4)	29.1 (84.4)	38.4 (101.1)	39.3 (102.7)	40.4 (104.7)	40.2 (104.4)	39.0 (102.2)	33.0 (91.4)	26.4 (79.5)	21.8 (71.2)	40.4 (104.7)
Mean daily maximum °C (°F)	10.0 (50.0)	11.7 (53.1)	15.0 (59.0)	17.4 (63.3)	23.5 (74.3)	29.4 (84.9)	33.4 (92.1)	32.9 (91.2)	27.2 (81.0)	21.7 (71.1)	14.7 (58.5)	10.7 (51.3)	20.6 (69.2)
Mean daily minimum °C (°F)	1.3 (34.3)	1.9 (35.4)	4.1 (39.4)	5.8 (42.4)	10.7 (51.3)	15.3 (59.5)	18.7 (65.7)	18.9 (66.0)	14.8 (58.6)	10.8 (51.4)	5.3 (41.5)	2.3 (36.1)	9.2 (48.5)
Record low °C (°F)	−10.5 (13.1)	−8.3 (17.1)	−5.5 (22.1)	−4.5 (23.9)	−1.3 (29.7)	1.1 (34.0)	8.0 (46.4)	8.0 (46.4)	4.5 (40.1)	0.6 (33.1)	−5.5 (22.1)	−8.7 (16.3)	−10.5 (13.1)
Average precipitation mm (inches)	36.7 (1.44)	25.6 (1.01)	34.6 (1.36)	42.4 (1.67)	43.2 (1.70)	23.5 (0.93)	17.7 (0.70)	13.4 (0.53)	42.8 (1.69)	30.5 (1.20)	36.4 (1.43)	45.0 (1.77)	391.8 (15.43)
Average snowy days (≥ 1 cm)	3	3	2	1	0	0	0	0	0	0	0	2	11
Source: Meoweather

== Transportation ==
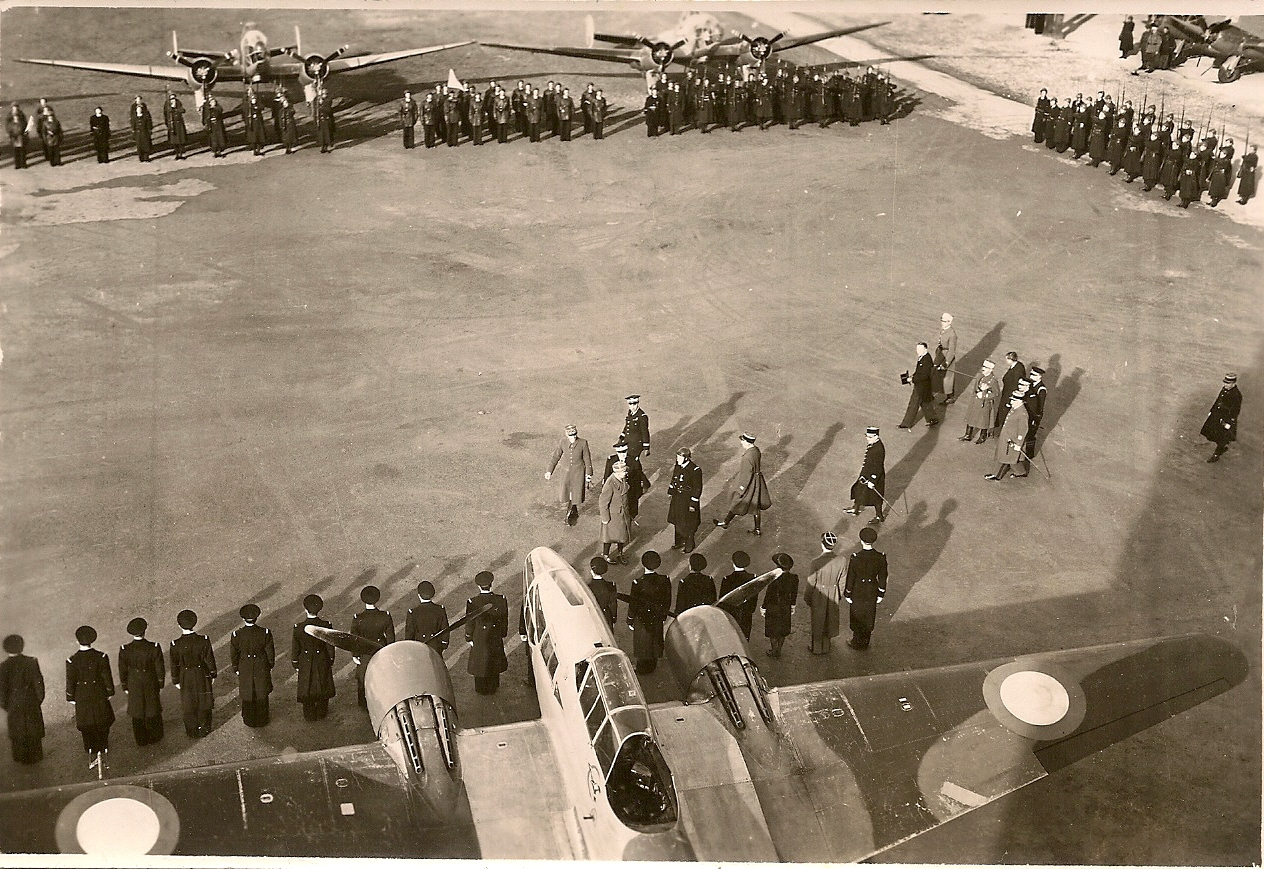
Maxime Weygand holds an inspection of French colonial troops at Aïn Arnat, 1940

Aïn Arnat has the main and only Airport in Sétif which is Ain Arnat Airport or Sétif International Airport Adding to that The National road N°5 which passes by it, and that makes it one of the most important communes in the wilaya of Sétif.
