= Aïn El Kébira District =

Coordinates: 36.3647°N 5.5019°E

- District
- Country: Algeria
- Province: Sétif Province
- Time zone: UTC+1 (CET)

Aïn El Kébira District is a district of Sétif Province, Algeria.

== Communes ==
The District is composed of three communes: Aïn El Kébira, Dehamcha and ouled Addouane.
