= Aïn Hanech =

Algerian lake

Ain El-Hanech
- The Source of the Serpent
- Interactive map of Ain El-Hanech
- 36°12′14″N 5°39′10″E
- Periods: Early Pleistocene
- Location: Algeria
- Region: Sétif Province

The prehistoric site of Aïn El-Hanech (also The Serpent’s Spring) is a former lake situated in the commune of Guelta Zerka, approximately 7 kilometers northwest of El Eulma, in the Sétif Province of Algeria.

== History ==
The Aïn El-Hanech site was discovered in 1947 by French paleoanthropologist Camille Arambourg (1885–1969) during his research on continental deposits in the Sétif region. Fossils found at the site have been dated to approximately 2.4 million years ago.

== Description ==
The site has produced fossilized remains of Lower Pleistocene animals, associated with an Oldowan-type pebble industry. The paleofauna includes elephants, equids, bovids, suids, hippopotamuses, and rhinoceroses. The worked pebbles consist of polyhedrons, subspheroids, and faceted spheroids similar to those from the Olduvai sites in Tanzania. They were found in a layer dated by paleomagnetism to approximately 1.8 million years ago and represent tools shaped through rudimentary flaking.

== Paleoenvironment ==
The remains of flora and fauna indicate an environment of alluvial plains and open savanna, with C3-type vegetation similar to that of present-day Mediterranean regions.

The site suggests seasonal occupation along the shores of an ancient lake, which provided raw materials such as limestone pebbles and flint nodules for toolmaking, as well as opportunities for hunting animals attracted to the water.

== Analysis ==
Although no human fossils have been discovered at the site, the antiquity of the Aïn El-Hanech deposit provides evidence of the early presence of hominins in North Africa at least 1.8 million years ago.

== See also ==
- Homo mauritanicus
