= Guenzet District =

Coordinates: 36.3167°N 4.8333°E

- District
- Country: Algeria
- Province: Sétif Province
- Time zone: UTC+1 (CET)

Guenzet District is a district of Sétif Province, Algeria.

The district is further divided into 2 municipalities:

- Guenzet
- Harbil
