= Bougaâ District =

Coordinates: 36.3324°N 5.0885°E

- District
- Country: Algeria
- Province: Sétif Province
- Time zone: UTC+1 (CET)

Bougaâ District is a district of Sétif Province, Algeria.

The district is further divided into 3 municipalities:

- Aïn Roua
- Beni Hocine
- Bougaa
