= Hammam Souhna District =

Coordinates: 36.0000°N 5.8000°E

- District
- Country: Algeria
- Province: Sétif Province
- Time zone: UTC+1 (CET)

Hammam Souhna District is a district of Sétif Province, Algeria.

The district is further divided into 3 municipalities:

- Hammam Soukhna
- Taya
- Tella
