= Maoklane District =

Coordinates: 36.3971°N 5.0753°E

- District
- Country: Algeria
- Province: Sétif Province
- Time zone: UTC+1 (CET)

Maoklane District is a district of Sétif Province, Algeria.

The district is further divided into 2 municipalities:

- Maoklane
- Talaifacene
