= Babor District =

Coordinates: 36.4904°N 5.5399°E

- District
- Country: Algeria
- Province: Sétif Province
- Time zone: UTC+1 (CET)

Babor District is a district of Sétif Province, Algeria.

The district is further divided into two municipalities:

- Babor
- Serdj El Ghoul
