= Beni Ourtilane District =

Beni Ourtilane District Asun n At wertiran دائرة بني ورثيلان
- District
- Map of Sétif Province highlighting Beni Ourtilane District
- Coordinates: 36°26′N 4°54′E
- Country: Algeria
- Province: Sétif
- District seat: Beni Ourtilane

Area
  - Total: 73 km^{2} (28 sq mi)

Population (1992)
  - Total: 12,022
  - Density: 160/km^{2} (430/sq mi)
- Time zone: UTC+01 (CET)
- District code: 19700
- Municipalities: 4

Beni Ourtilane (or At Wartiran as it is called by its native Kabyle inhabitants) is a district of the Sétif Province in the Petite Kabylie region of Algeria. It is named after its district capital Beni Ouartilene. It is located in the north-western part of the Sétif Province near the border with Béjaïa and Bordj Bou Arreridj. It was originally part of the Sétif Province when Algeria got its independence in 1962 but it became part of the Béjaïa Province in 1975. However, in 1985 it returned to become a part of the Sétif Province.

== Municipalities ==
Beni Ourtilane consists of four municipalities:

- Beni Ourtilane
- Beni Chebana
- Aïn Legraj
- Beni Mouhli

== Transport ==
Due to its remote location in the Babor Mountains, Beni Ourtilane is only accessible by one road, National Route 74.

== Notable people ==
- Cheikh Lhocine El Ouartilani
- Cheikh Fodil El Ouartilani
- Yahia Ait Hamoudi ben Abdellah Ait Hamoudi
- Abdellah ben Yahia Ait Hamoudi
- El Mouloud El Hafedi
