= Tamazirt (city) =

- city
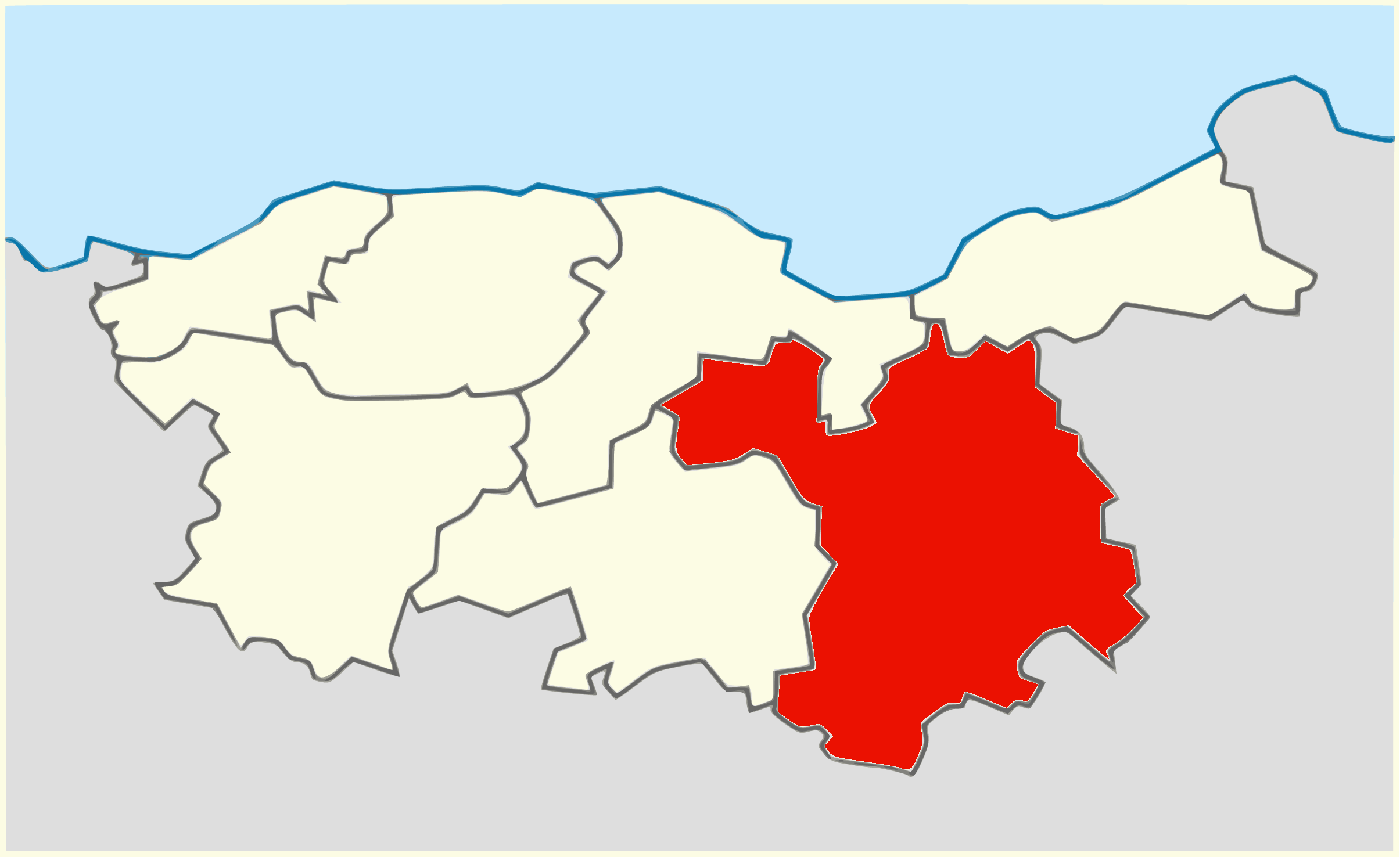

- Location within Algeria
- Coordinates: 36.2636°N 5.5999°E
- Country: Algeria
- Province: Sétif Province
- District: Sétif District

Population (2008)
  - Total: 6,590

Tamazirt is a small town in east of Kabylia (north of Algeria), in Sétif Province.70 km from Sétif city. Where there is a considerable number of lakes and waterways

== Languages ==
Tamazirt's population they are Amazighs of Kabylia. They speak Kabyle as an essential and first language, in addition to Spanish, French and Arabic in particular in schools as languages. But in the street, these languages are rare.

== Religious communities ==
The largest religious community in Tamazirt is Islam sunni, numbering (85.74%) of the population. The most significant other religious communities are Orthodox (including both Greek Orthodox and Eastern Orthodox) (13.20%), Reformed Church (1.6%)

== Climate ==
Tamazirt has a Humid continental climate (Köppen climate classification BSk), its summers are hot and semi-dry, whilst its winters are cool and somewhat moist.

Due to Tamazirt’s location between mountains at an elevation of 1,047 metres, it is one of the coldest regions during winter in Kabylie and all Algeria. In Tamazirt frequently sees an annual snowfall of up to 50 centimeters. The summer is fairly hot where extreme heat waves are common around the month of July where temperatures can sometimes even reach 35 °C.

Climate data for Tamazirt
Month	Jan	Feb	Mar	Apr	May	Jun	Jul	Aug	Sep	Oct	Nov	Dec	Year
Record high °C (°F)	16.5 (61.7)	20.6 (69.1)	22.0 (71.6)	28.1 (82.6)	31.4 (88.5)	37.3 (99.1)	40.4 (104.7)	40.2 (104.4)	35.0 (95.0)	29.5 (85.1)	23.4 (74.1)	18.8 (65.8)	40.4 (104.7)
Mean daily maximum °C (°F)	8.3 (46.9)	10.7 (51.3)	14.0 (57.2)	16.4 (61.5)	20.5 (68.9)	24.4 (75.9)	28.4 (83.1)	25.9 (78.6)	20.2 (68.4)	18.7 (65.7)	13.7 (56.7)	10.7 (51.3)	17.7 (63.8)
Mean daily minimum °C (°F)	−2.9 (26.8)	−1.9 (28.6)	2.1 (35.8)	5.8 (42.4)	9.7 (49.5)	15.3 (59.5)	18.7 (65.7)	18.9 (66.0)	14.8 (58.6)	10.8 (51.4)	4.3 (39.7)	−1.7 (28.9)	7.8 (46.1)
Record low °C (°F)	−11.5 (11.3)	−8.3 (17.1)	−5.5 (22.1)	−4.5 (23.9)	−1.3 (29.7)	1.1 (34.0)	8.0 (46.4)	8.0 (46.4)	4.5 (40.1)	0.6 (33.1)	−5.5 (22.1)	−9.7 (14.5)	−11.5 (11.3)
Average precipitation mm (inches)	289.6 (11.40)	182.6 (7.19)	103.6 (4.08)	66.4 (2.61)	38.2 (1.50)	5.5 (0.22)	3.7 (0.15)	8.4 (0.33)	37.8 (1.49)	48.5 (1.91)	87.4 (3.44)	198.0 (7.80)	1,069.7 (42.12)
Average rainy days (≥ 1 mm)	19	16	11	7	5	1	1	3	5	8	8	14	98
Average snowy days (≥ 1 cm)	9	6	4	2	0	0	0	0	0	0	2	7	30
Average relative humidity (%)	90	84	75	69	59	43	30	19	39	59	73	88	61
Source: Meoweather
