= Hammam Guergour District =

Coordinates: 36.3167°N 5.0667°E

- District
- Country: Algeria
- Province: Sétif Province
- Time zone: UTC+1 (CET)

Hammam Guergour District is a district of Sétif Province, Algeria.

The district is further divided into 2 municipalities:

- Draa Kebila
- Hammam Guergour
