= Brahim Chibout =

Algerian politician

Brahim Chibout (24 March 1927 – 1 August 2015) was the Algerian minister for veterans in the 1992 government of Belaid Abdessalam. Chibout was a leader in the National Liberation Army, the military wing of the nationalist movement that fought for Algerian independence from France in the Algerian War.
