= Abderrahim Deghmoum =

Algerian footballer (born 1998)

Personal information
- Full name: Abderrahim Deghmoum
- Date of birth: 2 December 1998 (age 27)
- Place of birth: Beni Aziz, Algeria
- Height: 1.78 m (5 ft 10 in)
- Position: Midfielder

Team information
- Current team: Al Masry SC
- Number: 30

Youth career
- ES Sétif

Senior career*
Years	Team	Apps	(Gls)
2017–2022	ES Sétif	103	(9)
2022–	Al Masry SC	84	(10)
- * Club domestic league appearances and goals as of 2nd November 2025

Abderrahim Deghmoum (born 2 December 1998 in Beni Aziz) is an Algerian footballer who plays for Egyptian Premier League club Al Masry SC.

== Career ==
On 24 April 2018 Deghmoum made his professional debut for Sétif as a substitute against Paradou AC. In 2022, he joined Al Masry SC.
