= Steia gens =

Ancient Roman family

The gens Steia was an obscure plebeian family at ancient Rome. No members of this gens are mentioned by ancient writers, but several are known from inscriptions, and at least some of them were of senatorial rank. A large number of the Steii settled in the provinces of Africa and Numidia.

== Origin ==
The nomen Steius resembles names belonging to a large class of gentilicia formed using the suffix -eius, which was typical of Oscan gentes. However, because the nomen is so short, this resemblance may be superficial, with ei belonging to the root, rather than being part of a gentile-forming suffix. Besides the African colonials, all of the known Steii lived at or in the immediate vicinity of Rome, in Latium, suggesting that the family might be of Latin origin.

== Praenomina ==
The Steii known from inscriptions used only the most common praenomina, including Lucius, Gaius, Marcus, and Publius, with no obvious preference.

== Members ==
This list includes abbreviated praenomina. For an explanation of this practice, see filiation.

- Lucius Steius, a military tribune in the Legio IX Hispana, was appointed one of the legates for taking the census under Trajan. He was subsequently proconsul of an uncertain province.
- Lucius Steius Aemilianus, a Roman senator, and the wife of Annia Alexandria, according to a third-century inscription from Rome.
- Publius Steius Capianus, buried at Thugga in Africa Proconsularis, aged seventy-five.
- Steia Chreste, named in a funerary inscription from Rome.
- Steius Cilio, a soldier mentioned in an inscription from Castellum Dimmidi in Numidia.
- Steia Decumina, a girl buried at Rome, aged ten years, three months, and six days, with a monument from her father, Steius Valerianus.
- Steia Donatula, buried in a second- or third-century tomb at Ammaedara in Africa Proconsularis, aged fifty, with a monument from her husband, Titus Lartius Quintulus.
- Gaius Steius F[...], buried at Masculula in Africa Proconsularis, aged fifty-five years, three days.
- Marcus Steius Faustus, buried at Masculula, aged twenty, along with his mother, Minucia Prima, aged forty-five.
- Publius Steius Felix, the former master of Steia Fortunata, at some point in the first or second century.
- Steia Fortunata, the house-slave of Publius Steius Felix, became the wife of Sextus Gavius, to whom she was married for twenty-one years, and the mother of Sextus Gavius Scantianus, who along with his father dedicated a monument at Portus in Latium in his mother's memory, dating to the second century, or the latter half of the first.
- Lucius Steius Lucanus, buried at Thugga, aged eighty.
- Steia Olympias, buried at Ostia in Latium, during the latter half of the second century.
- Marcus Steius Priscus, together with his wife, Lollie Isias, dedicated a tomb at Ostia to their son, Marcus Steius Rogatus.
- Steia Privata, buried at the site of modern Belab, formerly part of Africa Proconsularis, aged seventy-five, next to Publius Marius, aged eighty, perhaps her husband.
- Marcus Steius M. f. Rogatus, buried at Ostia, aged eleven years, nine months, and twenty-five days, with a monument from his parents, Marcus Steius Priscus and Lollia Isias.
- Gaius Steius C. f. Sabinianus, a soldier in the Legio III Augusta, buried at Lambaesis in Numidia, aged twenty-five, with a monument from his brother, Gaius Julius Pontius.
- Publius Steius Valens, a soldier in the century of Caesernius Senecio, serving in the fifth cohort of the vigiles at Rome in AD 210.
- Steius Valerianus, dedicated a tomb at Rome for his daughter, Steia Decumina.

== See also ==
- List of Roman gentes

== Bibliography ==
- Theodor Mommsen et alii, Corpus Inscriptionum Latinarum (The Body of Latin Inscriptions, abbreviated CIL), Berlin-Brandenburgische Akademie der Wissenschaften (1853–present).
- Gustav Wilmanns, Inscriptiones Africae Latinae (Latin Inscriptions from Africa, abbreviated ILAfr), Georg Reimer, Berlin (1881).
- August Pauly, Georg Wissowa, et alii, Realencyclopädie der Classischen Altertumswissenschaft (Scientific Encyclopedia of the Knowledge of Classical Antiquities, abbreviated RE or PW), J. B. Metzler, Stuttgart (1894–1980).
- George Davis Chase, "The Origin of Roman Praenomina", in Harvard Studies in Classical Philology, vol. VIII, pp. 103–184 (1897).
- Paul von Rohden, Elimar Klebs, & Hermann Dessau, Prosopographia Imperii Romani (The Prosopography of the Roman Empire, abbreviated PIR), Berlin (1898).
- Gilbert-Charles Picard, Castellum Dimmidi, Paris (1948).
- M. Khanoussi, L. Maurin, Mourir à Dougga: Receuil des inscriptions funéraires (Dying in Dougga: a Compendium of Funerary Inscriptions, abbreviated MAD), Bordeaux, Tunis (2002).
- Alfredo Marinucci, Diseicta Membra. Iscrizioni Latine da Ostia e Porto, 1981–2009 (Scattered Limbs: Latin Inscriptions from Ostia and Portus, 1981–2009, abbreviated ILOP), Rome (2012).
