= Occia gens =

The gens Occia was a minor plebeian family at Rome. Members of this gens are first mentioned under Tiberius, but must have been at Rome for much longer; for Tacitus speaks of Occia, a Vestal Virgin who died in AD 19, after serving faithfully for fifty-seven years. A few of the Occii pursued political careers in this period, but most are known only from inscriptions.

== Members ==
This list includes abbreviated praenomina. For an explanation of this practice, see filiation.

- Occia, a Vestal Virgin, died in AD 19, after performing her priestly duties for fifty-seven years.
- Occia C. f., buried at Rome, aged sixty.
- Occia C. f., buried at Tarquinii, aged sixty.
- Decimus Occius D. f., the patron and former master of Decimus Occius Eros, mentioned in an inscription from Rome.
- Gaius Occius M. f., one of the municipal officials at Pompeii.
- Lucius Occius L. f., the former master of Lucius Occius Aristo and Occia Agathea, named in a funerary inscription from Cures in Sabinum.
- Manius Occius M'. f., one of the judicial magistrates at Signia in Latium.
- Occia L. l. Agathea, a freedwoman buried at Cures.
- Lucius Occius L. l. Agathopus, the freedman of Lucius Occius Helius, to whom he dedicated a monument at Rome.
- Occia Agile, wife of Quintus Anquirinnius Secundus, with whom she dedicated a monument to their son, Quintus Anquirinnius Severus, at Pisae.
- Publius Occius P. l. Anchialus, a freedman buried at Aquileia in the province of Venetia et Histria.
- Lucius Occius L. l. Aristo, a freedman buried at Cures.
- Occia Auge, wife of Pomponius Gaetulus, buried at Theveste in Africa Proconsularis, aged thirty-seven.
- Gaius Occius M. f. Basillus, buried at the present site of Ksar Mahidjiba, perhaps originally Castellum Fabatianum, in Numidia, aged twenty-one.
- Titus Occius Castus, buried at Tubusuctu in Mauretania Caesariensis.
- Publius Occius P. l. Dunomarus, a freedman buried at Aquileia.
- Quintus Occius Epigonus, a freedman, who dedicated a monument to Quintus Occius Narcissus at Puteoli in Campania.
- Occius Eutyches, husband of Fortunatia Veratia, named in an inscription from Dea Augusta Vocontiorum in Gallia Narbonensis.
- Occius Flamma, proconsul of Crete under the emperor Tiberius.
- Lucius Occius Helius, the patron and former master of Lucius Occius Agathopus, buried at Rome.
- Lucius Occius Hermia, named in an inscription from Rome.
- Decimus Occius D. l. Eros, a freedman, mentioned in two inscriptions from Rome.
- Occia Fotis, dedicated a monument at Rome in memory of her son, Lucius Occius Maximus.
- Occia Fortunata, buried at Masculula, aged fourteen years, seven months.
- Publius Occius Julianus, buried at Potentia in Lucania, aged seventeen.
- Lucius Occius Martialis, mentioned in an inscription from Madauros in Africa Proconsularis.
- Occius Macrini f. Martialis, buried at the site of the present village of Bordj M'Raou, formerly in Africa Proconsularis, age eighteen.
- Lucius Occius Maximus, the son of Occia Fotis, was born pridie Nonas Novembres, (Note: The nones of November fell on the fifth, so Lucius was born on the fourth. From his age, he must have died on the twenty-eighth of July.) and buried at Rome, aged twenty-four years, eight months, and twenty-four days.
- Quintus Occius Narcissus, buried at Puteoli.
- Gaius Occius C. l. Philomusus, a freedman buried at Rome.
- Lucius Occius L. l. Philomusus, a freedman named in an inscription from Rome.
- Occia Primitiva, the wife of Marcus Licinius Apollonius, with whom she dedicated a monument to her son, Marcus Licinius Probus, aged four years, three months, and twenty-one days.
- Lucius Occius Primitivus, dedicated a monument at Rome to his friend, Marcus Terentius Silvius.
- Occius Priscus, dedicated a monument at Rome to Occia Thallusa.
- Occius Publilius Eutychus, dedicated a monument to his wife, Claudia Olympias, who was buried at Rome, aged forty-nine.
- Publius Occius Quintillianus, buried at Milevum in Numidia.
- Marcus Occius Ruso, one of a group of pontifices sent to the colony of Sutrium in Etruria.
- Gaius Occius Saturninus, buried at Thamugadi in Numidia, aged twenty-one.
- Gaius Occius Similis Blera, a secutor tribuni (Note: An assistant to one of the military tribunes.) mentioned in a list of soldiers at Rome, dating to AD 113.
- Occia Spicula, wife of Caecilianus, buried at Thagura in Africa Proconsularis.
- Occia Sponde, wife of Marcus Junius Fortunatus, buried at Rome, aged thirty-three years and forty-two days.
- Occia Tertulla, dedicated a monument to her brother, Gaius Elvius Sextinus, at Nemausus in Gallia Narbonensis.
- Occia Thallusa, buried at Rome.
- Occia C. l. Trallis, a freedwoman, buried at Rome.
- Occia Verecunda, named in a funerary monument from Carnuntum in Pannonia Superior.

== See also ==
- List of Roman gentes

== Bibliography ==
- Lucius Annaeus Seneca (Seneca the Elder), Controversiae.
- Publius Cornelius Tacitus, Annales.
- Dictionary of Greek and Roman Biography and Mythology, William Smith, ed., Little, Brown and Company, Boston (1849).
- Theodor Mommsen et alii, Corpus Inscriptionum Latinarum (The Body of Latin Inscriptions, abbreviated CIL), Berlin-Brandenburgische Akademie der Wissenschaften (1853–present).
- Wilhelm Henzen, Ephemeris Epigraphica: Corporis Inscriptionum Latinarum Supplementum (Journal of Inscriptions: Supplement to the Corpus Inscriptionum Latinarum, abbreviated EE), Institute of Roman Archaeology, Rome (1872–1913).
- Bulletin Archéologique du Comité des Travaux Historiques et Scientifiques (Archaeological Bulletin of the Committee on Historic and Scientific Works, abbreviated BCTH), Imprimerie Nationale, Paris (1885–1973).
- René Cagnat et alii, L'Année épigraphique (The Year in Epigraphy, abbreviated AE), Presses Universitaires de France (1888–present).
- Paul von Rohden, Elimar Klebs, & Hermann Dessau, Prosopographia Imperii Romani (The Prosopography of the Roman Empire, abbreviated PIR), Berlin (1898).
- Stéphane Gsell, Inscriptions Latines de L'Algérie (Latin Inscriptions from Algeria, abbreviated ILAlg), Edouard Champion, Paris (1922–present).
- Emile Espérandieu, Inscriptions Latines de Gaule (Narbonnaise) (Latin Inscriptions from Gallia Narbonensis, abbreviated ILGN), Ernest Leroux, Paris (1929).
- Annona Epigraphica Austriaca (Epigraphy of Austria Annual, abbreviated AEA) (1979–present).
- Silvio Panciera, La collezione epigrafica dei musei Capitolini (The Epigraphic Collection of the Capitoline Museum, abbreviated CECapitol), Quasar Edizioni, Rome (1987).
- Giovanni Battista Brusin, Inscriptiones Aquileiae (Inscriptions of Aquileia, abbreviated InscrAqu), Udine (1991–1993).
