= Mohamed Elias Mesli =

Algerian politician

Mohamed Elias Mesli is an Algerian politician who was the minister for agriculture in the 1992 government of Belaid Abdessalam.
