= Guidjel District =

Coordinates: 36.1185°N 5.5300°E

- District
- Country: Algeria
- Province: Sétif Province
- Time zone: UTC+1 (CET)

Guidjel District is a district of Sétif Province, Algeria.

The district is further divided into 2 municipalities:

- Guidjel
- Ouled Sabor
