= El Ouldja, Sétif =

El Ouldja
- Commune and town
- Location within Algeria
- Coordinates: 36°3′49″N 5°57′13″E
- Country: Algeria
- Province: Sétif Province
- District: Bir El Arch District

Population (2008)
  - Total: 8,592
- Time zone: UTC+1 (CET)

El Ouldja is a town and commune in Sétif Province, Algeria.
