= Beni Ourtilane =

Beni Ouartilene At wertiran (Ith Warthirane) أيت ورثيلان
- Commune and town
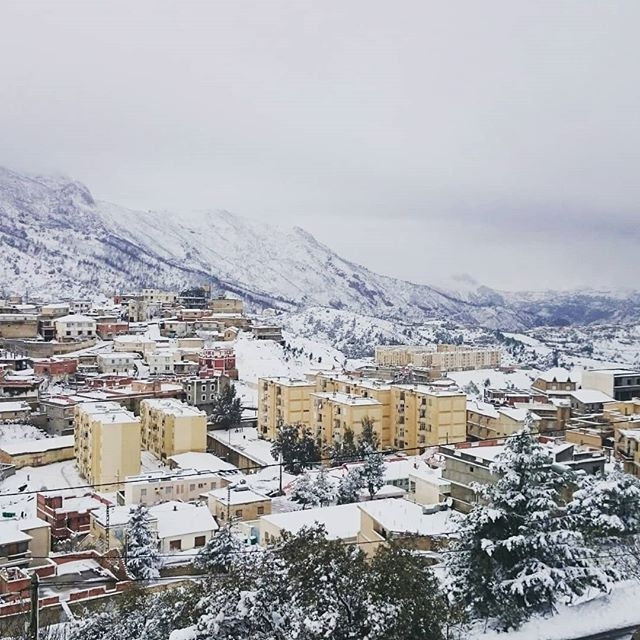

- Location within Algeria
- Coordinates: 36.4333°N 4.9°E
- Country: Algeria
- Province: Setif Province
- District: Beni Ourtilane District

Area
  - Total: 28 sq mi (73 km^{2})

Population (2008)
  - Total: 10,591
- Time zone: UTC+1 (CET)

Beni Ourtilane (Kabyle: At wertiran) is a town and commune in Setif Province, Kabylie in north-eastern Algeria.

The city is mainly Kabyle.

== Notable people ==
- Fodil El Ouartilani, Algerian independence activist and advisor to Imam Yahya of Yemen
- Hocine El Ouartilani, Islamic scholar and travel writer
