= Aïn Azel =

Coordinates: 35°50′36″N 5°31′19″E

Aïn Azel Ampère
- Commune
- Aïn Azel
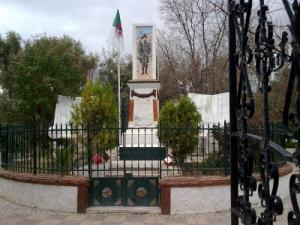
- City center of Ain Azel
- Nickname: Ampère
- Interactive map of Aïn Azel
- Country: Algeria
- Established: 1895
- Founder: French Algeria
- Named for: André-Marie Ampère
- Elevation: 960 m (3,150 ft)
- Postal code: 19007

The commune of Aïn Azel (French: Ampère, Tamazight: ⴰⵉⵏ ⴰⵣⵍ) was a farming settlement constructed by France in 1895 and named after the French scientist André-Marie Ampère, Aïn Azel is located fifty kilometres south of Sétif in Algeria and is at the frontier between Sétif Province and Batna Province. The population of Aïn Azel is of chaoui origins estimated to be around 37,970 people (2008). The male population of Aïn Azel is referred to as "Les Ampérois" and the female population as "Les Ampéroises". Ampère was established as a full-fledged commune by decree of 12 April 1922 and was attached to the department of Setif in 1956. The area of Sétif (and consequently Ampère 'Aïn Azel') was considered since March 4, 1848 as an integral part of French territory; Algeria was administratively organized in the same way as the Métropole for a hundred years.

== Origin of the name ==
Ampère was the commune's founding name was after the famous French scientist André-Marie Ampère, the name was given after its founding on September 4, 1895 and the town was known as Ampère between 1895 and 1962.

After independence of Algeria from France in 1962, the newly given name "Aïn Azel" comes from the local chaoui Berber word "Azzel" which means "he who runs" or Azel which means "precious". This name, together with the Arabic word Aïn ("Fountain") may therefore mean "the fountain that runs" or "the precious fountain". "Azel" also means mid-day in Berber therefore Ain Azel means "The source of Mid-day"

== History ==
=== Antiquity ===
We find the trace of a “Pharaoh’s ditch” with an aqueduct which passes through the RMADA farm to the south of PASCAL, lake BAHIRA goes back towards where there was an important Roman century camp. This Pharaoh's ditch is most certainly the defensive ditch marking the southern border of Numidia, built by the Roman legions at the beginning of the 1st century (50 to 60 AD). Further northeast, there are ruins of an important Roman city known as 'PERDICES'.

=== French Département ===
Aïn Azel is very important road junction, a necessary passage towards the southern region, HODNA and BISKRA but also the region of BATNA as travellers, by taking the EL GUIBA pass in search of pastures and work, join the TELL and the Friday market in Ampère allows them to trade and stock up for the trip through the Aures Mountains, therefore Aïn Azel was the gate to Aures mountains.

In 1844, a French military column leaving SETIF on August 31 with the mission of organizing the exploitation of construction and heating wood in the BOU TALEB forest, established a temporary camp near the site of Aïn Azel and praised the qualities of the location and what it had to offer. 6 kilometers to the east of the future village was the military colonization farm, a Christian cemetery, where the graves of the soldiers of the 61st Line of Colonel BERNELLE, as well as the victims of the bloody engagement of 23 March, 1850 and the first settlers of the period 1839-1845 were laid to rest. To the north of the bordj GOURDON, around one then a few huts, the Djemaa AOKA and its marabout.

4 km to the south, the road forms a fork enclosing a hillock covered with Roman ruins. this is what the first arrivals discovered. Aïn Azel is the richest area in Aquafier water and was well known throughout to be a safe haven for caravans seeking to fill up in drink from its multiple water sources and wells.

This place was created by colonization like many villages in the High Plateaus; the Engineering officers responsible for searching for settlement sites had the following essential guidelines in mind:

- Availability of land, without obligation to purchase or expropriation from locals.
- Water and sanitation

European families began settlement in the land well before 1870.

The population centre of Aïn Azel, which was being created in the mixed commune of Rhira, was named Ampère by decision of 4 September 1895. The land was expropriated by decree of 12 May 1896 and the centre was largely populated by the end of 1897. The name was confirmed by decree of 28 December 1915. Ampère was established as a full-fledged commune by decree of 12 April 1922 and It was attached to the department of Setif in 1956. A specialized administrative section today bears the name of Aïn Azel.

==== Detailed events ====
1876: On April 7, following the instructions received from the Governor General, the general commanding the Constantine division, prescribed to its civil office, a study on the Aïn Azel site, with a view to establishing a colony. This study will not be carried out until March 30, 1882.

1882: March 30, project begins to create a Center in AÏN AZEL.

==== Expenses for founding Ain Azel ====
The only necessary and urgent expenses for the establishment of the colony were:

Project	Expense (Francs)
Water Pipes to water sources	20,000
Access road	280,000
Leveling and stonework for streets	5,000
School Establishment	25,000
Total:	340,000

January 29, 1894: the engineer of Bridges and Roads, draws up an estimate of the work necessary for the creation of the center, it amounts to 128,000 francs. Mr. RABY, Chief Engineer then presents the plan of the village and the enlargement.

September 4, 1895: Governor General of Algeria attributed the name AMPERE to the village being created in AÏN AZEL mixed commune of RHIRA, district of SETIF and he prescribed to substitute this new name for the old one in all official acts as well as in correspondence.

June 26, 1896: a poster announcing the tendering of the works of first installation of the village; Mr. CARLONNE Pierre was the successful bidder for a discount of 27% for a total cost of 89,588.45 francs of the first sold plot in newly constructed Ampère.

August 12, 1897: the work is completed, the mass settlement begins as the first settlers arrive, their requests for settlement to the government were dated from 1893.

1903 First expansion: Aïn Azel, which has barely been in existence for four years, has developed with surprising speed. The progress made in such a short space of time, the commission was therefore unanimously in favor of the project to extend the perimeter of this center by enlarging the original concessions and by forming new farm lots.

November 30: the uncultivated lands of douar TENNEZARET was not however to be incorporated into the territory of colonization and left to the natives (Chaouias).

June 15, 1906: the authorization to combine the two concessions of the Djebel SOUBELLA mine and DRA SFA was granted to the company of BOU TALEB mine which owns it. (This mine with deposits of zinc, lead and related metals was operated by a metropolitan company whose senior executives were also mostly from metropolitan France. This is the LAURIUM Français Company with its directors Messrs. Justin GRIL and FOUGERE.) This site was also the site of a mining catastrophe on 2 June 1990, which resulted in the death of approximately twenty workers when a zinc and lead mine was flooded.

1908: AMPERE center and the expansion area are increasingly prosperous, the health status is very satisfactory, the population is made up of 614 inhabitants including 241 French with 15 births and one death were recorded this year. The center is provided with all the essential services, all the trades represented. 43 boys and 24 girls attend the schools. The harvest, thanks to spring rains, was abundant.

April 12, 1922: Ampère becomes a Municipality, Vizzavona Alphonse, originally from Corsica, becomes the first Mayor of Ampère.

1923: On December 10, a Agellid (Leader) position is created, it will be Abdallah HAMOUDA, the son of Bachaga who will occupy this position until 1962.

1945: 8th of May 1945, serious event bloodied the region of Setif, the French crackdown on the Algerian civilians spread to the entire region. As a security measure, the Europeans from the isolated farms returned to the village and most of them regrouped in the lower district. VILLARD Albert, who was in SETIF on Tuesday, obtained, through the Administrator delegated to the sub-prefecture authorization to distribute the weapons of war stored at the Town Hall of Ain Azel (Approx: 50 LEBEL rifles modèle 86/93 and 5000 ammunitions). The order was given by telephone to Lucien SGAMBATTI, town hall secretary. The natives, of Chaouïa origin, did not cause rebellion, their Agellids (Leaders), rural guards were ready to defend Chaouia village against any French crackdown without any weapons of their own.

1950: Ain Azel Becomes a huge construction zone with the following buildings under construction:

Buildings
Post Office (Inaugurated in 1952)	Renovation of Water distribution network
Electric distribution centre	Construction of 450 Metric cube Chateau d'eau (Water Reservoir)
Gendarmerie Barracks	L'AMG (Polyclinic health center with consultation and hospitalization rooms)

September 30th,1957: decree of the Minister of Algeria concerning the opening of an airfield in Ampère.

1958: The village was young, dynamic; boys and girls got along perfectly and regularly organized parties, dances in the cafes. The most beautiful festival was that of the natives which took place in the summer after the end of the agricultural work, in the open air, on the town hall square. All the villagers participated in its organization, the village was then decked out and decorated. Poplar foliage isolated the square where a dance floor was set up, surrounded by benches, tables and chairs, two orchestras, among the best in SETIF, entertained until dawn on these two nights

=== Demographics under colonial era ===
All the families, most of them completely destitute, came from the deprived, poor regions of Metropolitan France, in particular, Ardèche, Ariège, Tarn, Haute Savoie, Corsica, Alsace-Lorraine and also from the Mediterranean regions, including Malta, Southern Italy, Sicily, etc.

Year	Settlers
1898	44 families
1903	62 families: 40 European families residing in Ampère; 10 native Algerian families renting property from Europeans; 12 families living in Oussera
1908	614 European settlers, 241 of whom of French descent.
1914-1918	Complete halt of expansion of Ampère due to French total mobilization of men and children for World War I, many of whom never returned home.
1926	269 European settlers 1492 Native Algerian Chaouis.
1946	150 European settlers 3050 Native Algerian Chaouis.
1948	135 European Settlers 3468 Native Chaoui Algerians

== Geography ==
=== Colonization report ===
There flows on this territory 7 to 8 springs, which merge into one in a marshy area to the north; this spring has a flow of about 18 liters per second. The climate is continental with occasional hailstorms and torrential rains which can flood the plain.

Ain Azel is located in a mountain range and is surrounded by the following Mountains:

- Djebel Loumassa and Djebel Sekrine to the west
- Djebel Gatiane to the south
- Djebel Lehcana to the south-east
- Djebel Kaläaoun to the east (behind which there are the chotts of Aïn-Lahdjar and Beida-Bordj).

== Economy ==
A flour mill already existed on the site of Ain Azel constructed in early 1850s by the first settlers and the French commission was of the opinion that it should be kept after the founding of Aïn Azel, irrigation can be done downstream of the tailrace, it is an industry already created that can only be beneficial in this farming colony abundant in wheat and barley. After independence of Algeria, the site of the mill was kept for the same usage today as the mill is considered an important symbol for the agricultural city.

=== Soil ===
The territory of Aïn Azel is mainly made up of a vast plain covered with wheat broom. The soil of this plain is loose on a great depth, that is to say easy to loosen because it does not contain stones and is composed of a very sandy clay easy to plow. A plow moved with sufficient force could break down up to 50 to 60 centimeters and the territory being a plain the use of the steam plow would be ideal. The level of the water source from the mountain which higher than that of the plain would allow, if its flow was sufficient, to irrigate it.
