= Oum Ladjoul =

Coordinates: 35°56′N 5°54′E

- Commune and town
- Interactive map of Oum Ladjoul
- Country: Algeria
- Province: Sétif Province
- Time zone: UTC+1 (CET)

Oum Ladjoul is a town and commune in Sétif Province in north-eastern Algeria.
