= Ouled Tebben =

- Commune and town
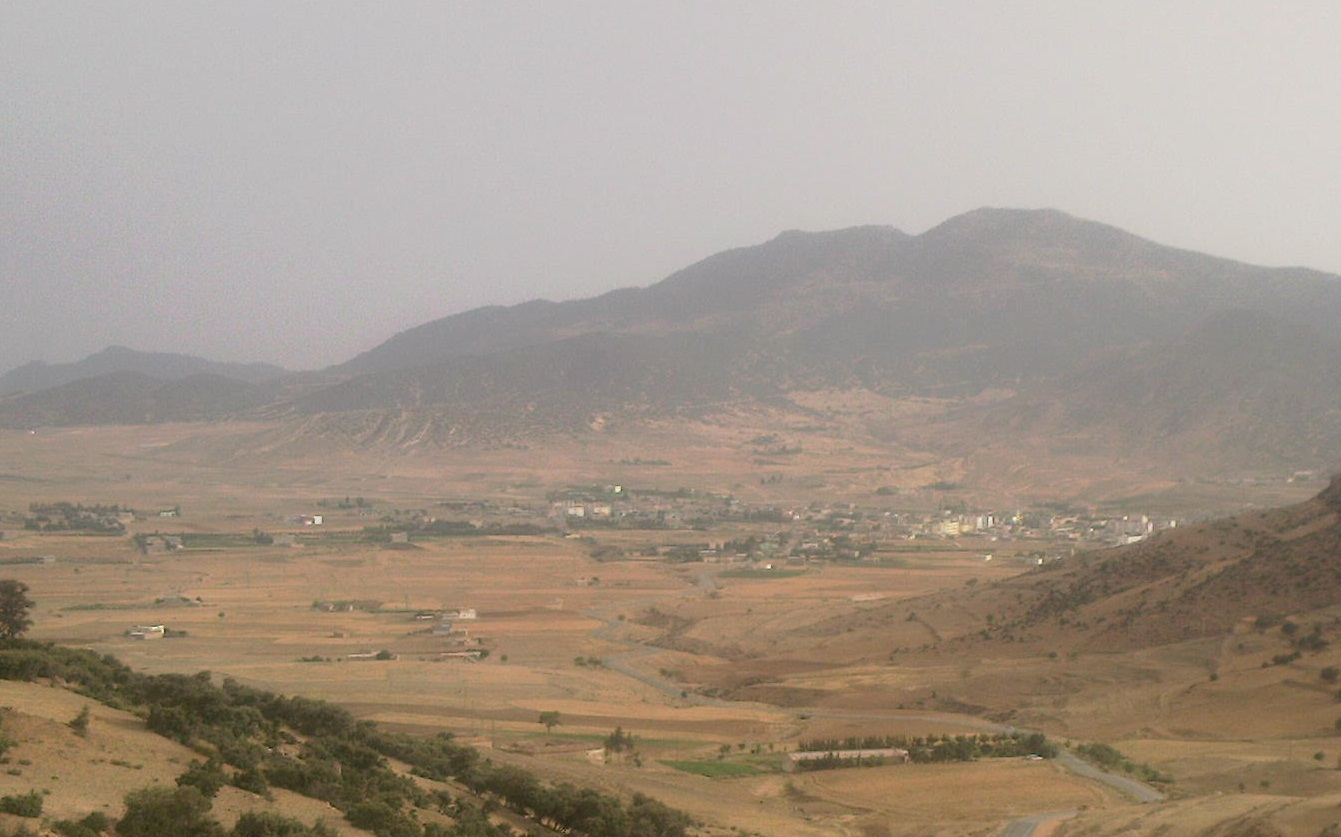

- Location within Algeria
- Coordinates: 35°48′46″N 5°6′5″E
- Country: Algeria
- Province: Setif Province
- District: Salah Bey
- Elevation: 3,710 ft (1,130 m)
- Time zone: UTC+1 (CET)

Ouled Tebben is a town and commune in Setif Province in north-eastern Algeria. It is located in the Hodna Mountains.

The city contains is an Arab tribe from the Ayad, a branch of the Banu Hilal.
