= South Righa =

Region of Algeria

South Righa is a geographical, historical and ethnological region of Algeria, in Setif Province, which consists mainly of Berbers and is subdivided into parts (Beni Righa, Beni Ouerra, etc.).

== Demography ==
The region is divided into several parts: Tribe of Berber origin ( Chaoui descent):

- Ouled Brahim
- Zeghaba
- Ouled Abd El Ouahed
- Mouassa
- Frikates
- Ouled Bibi
- Ouled Lmadaci
- Ouled Ben Amer Sebaâ
- Ouled Mtaa

(Ayad and Douaouda descent) :

- Ouled Tebbane
- Ahl Annouel
- Ahl Bouthaleb
- Ouled Kemadja
- Ahl al-Hamma
- Ouled Hanneche
