= Belaid Abdessalam =

Algerian politician (1928–2020)

- بلعيد عبد السلام
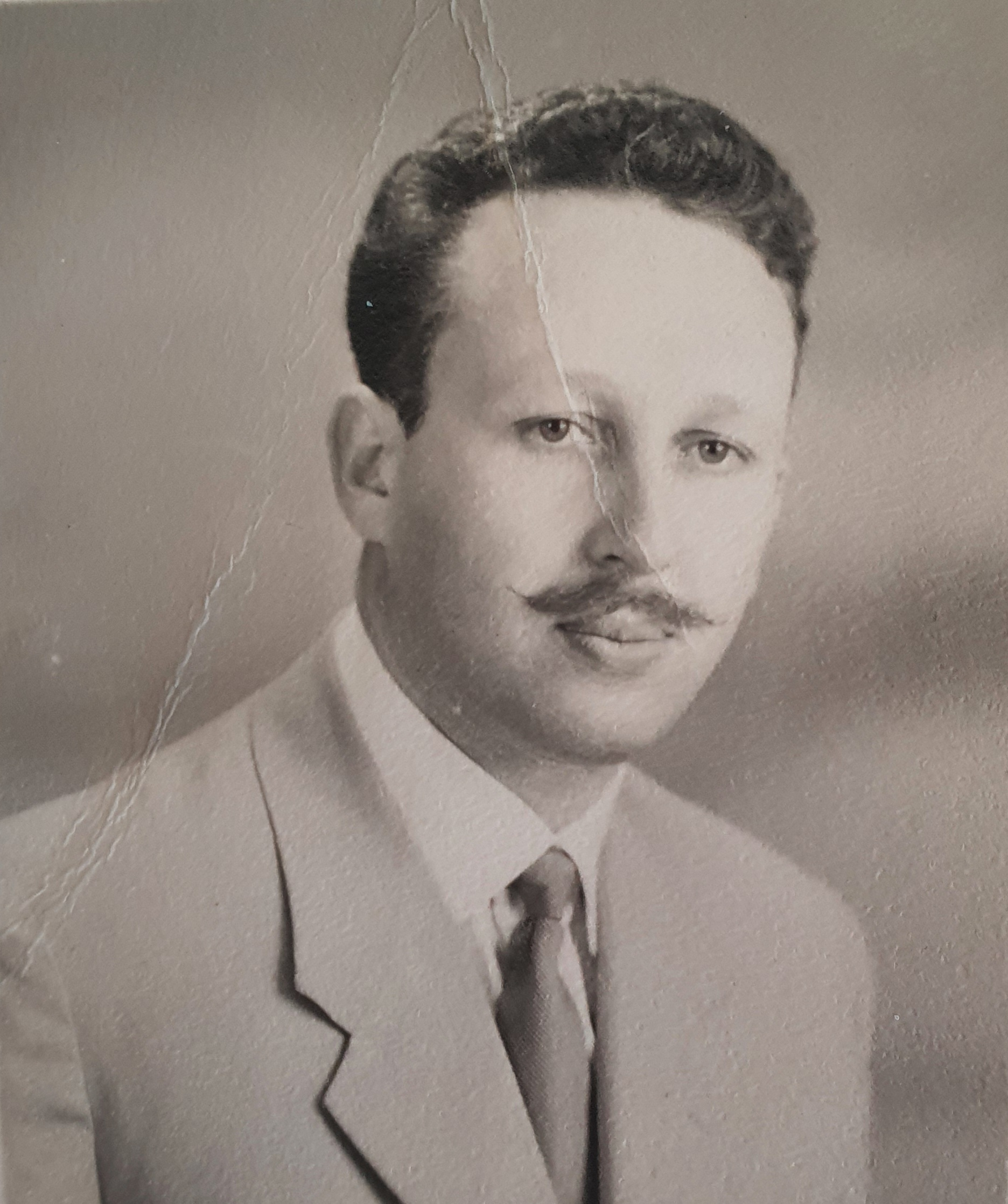

7th Prime Minister of Algeria
- In office 8 July 1992 – 21 August 1993
- President: Ali Kafi
- Preceded by: Sid Ahmed Ghozali
- Succeeded by: Redha Malek

Personal details
- Born: 20 July 1928 Dehamcha, Sétif, Algeria
- Died: 27 June 2020 (aged 91) Algiers, Algeria

Belaid Abdessalam (Arabic: بلعيد عبد السلام; 20 July 1928 – 27 June 2020) was an Algerian politician, who served as Prime Minister from 1992 to 1993.

== Biography ==
Abdessalam was born in Dehamcha, Sétif Province, Algeria on 20 July 1928. Abdessalam was a nationalist leader in the FLN during Algeria's struggle for independence from France. He was minister of industry and power under the military regime of Houari Boumedienne, and his name was closely connected with the former Algerian state policy of building a base of heavy industry through planned economy. Abdessalam served as Head of Government of Algeria from 8 July 1992 until 21 August 1993. He also hold the portfolio of Minister of Finance. During his tenure, the Algerian Civil War with Islamist rebels intensified.

On 27 June 2020, he died at Ain Naadja military hospital in Algiers, aged 91.

Political offices
Preceded by Sid Ahmed Ghozali	Head of Government of Algeria; 1992–1993	Succeeded by Redha Malek
