= Belaa =

Coordinates: 36°12′N 5°51′E

- Commune and town
- Country: Algeria
- Province: Sétif Province

Population (2008)
  - Total: 14,666
- Time zone: UTC+1 (CET)
- Postal code: 19660

Belaa is a town and commune in Sétif Province in north-eastern Algeria.
