= Aïn Legraj =

Coordinates: 36.4096°N 4.8910°E

Aïn Legraj Ithabraham Beni brahim
- Commune and town
- Interactive map of Aïn Legraj
- Country: Algeria
- Province: Sétif Province
- Time zone: UTC+1 (CET)

Aïn Legraj is a town and commune in Sétif Province in north-eastern Algeria.
