= Aït Tizi =

Coordinates: 36°33′32″N 5°07′38″E

Ait Tizi
- Commune and town
- Interactive map of Ait Tizi
- Country: Algeria
- Province: Sétif Province
- Time zone: UTC+1 (CET)

Ait Tizi is a town and commune in Sétif Province in north-eastern Algeria.
