= Harbil =

Coordinates: 36.32488°N 4.92641°E

- Commune and town
- Interactive map of Harbil
- Country: Algeria
- Province: Sétif Province
- Time zone: UTC+1 (CET)

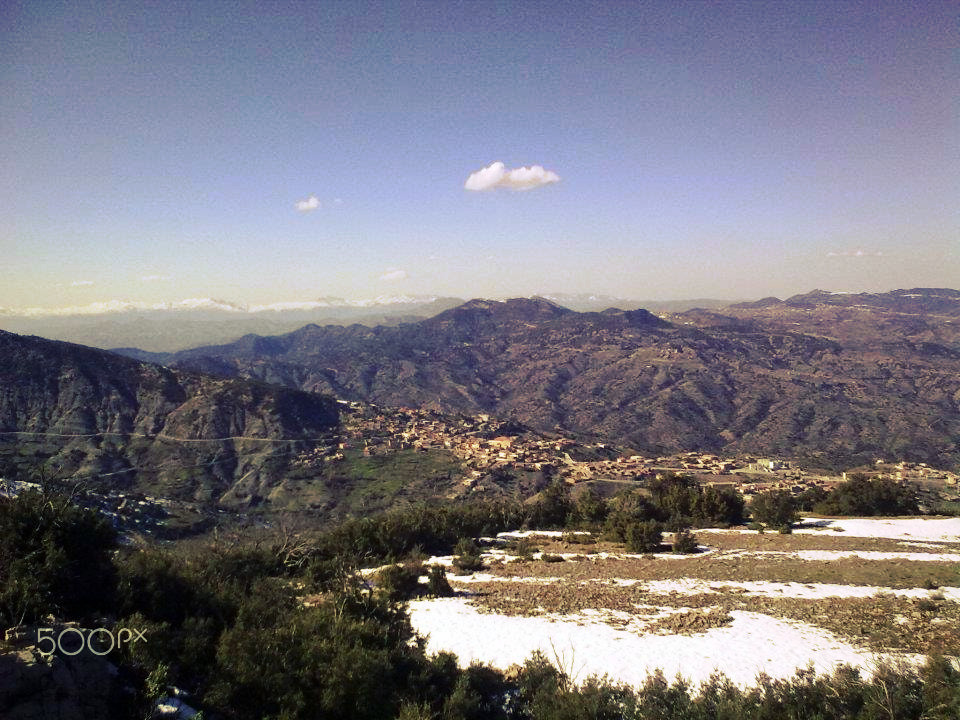

Harbil is a town and commune in Sétif Province in north-eastern Algeria.
