= Bousselam =

Coordinates: 36.49419°N 5.04359°E

- Commune and town
- Interactive map of Bousselam
- Country: Algeria
- Province: Sétif Province
- Time zone: UTC+1 (CET)

Bousselam is a town and commune in Sétif Province in north-eastern Algeria.
