= Oued El Barad =

Coordinates: 36°28′36″N 5°24′05″E

- Commune and town
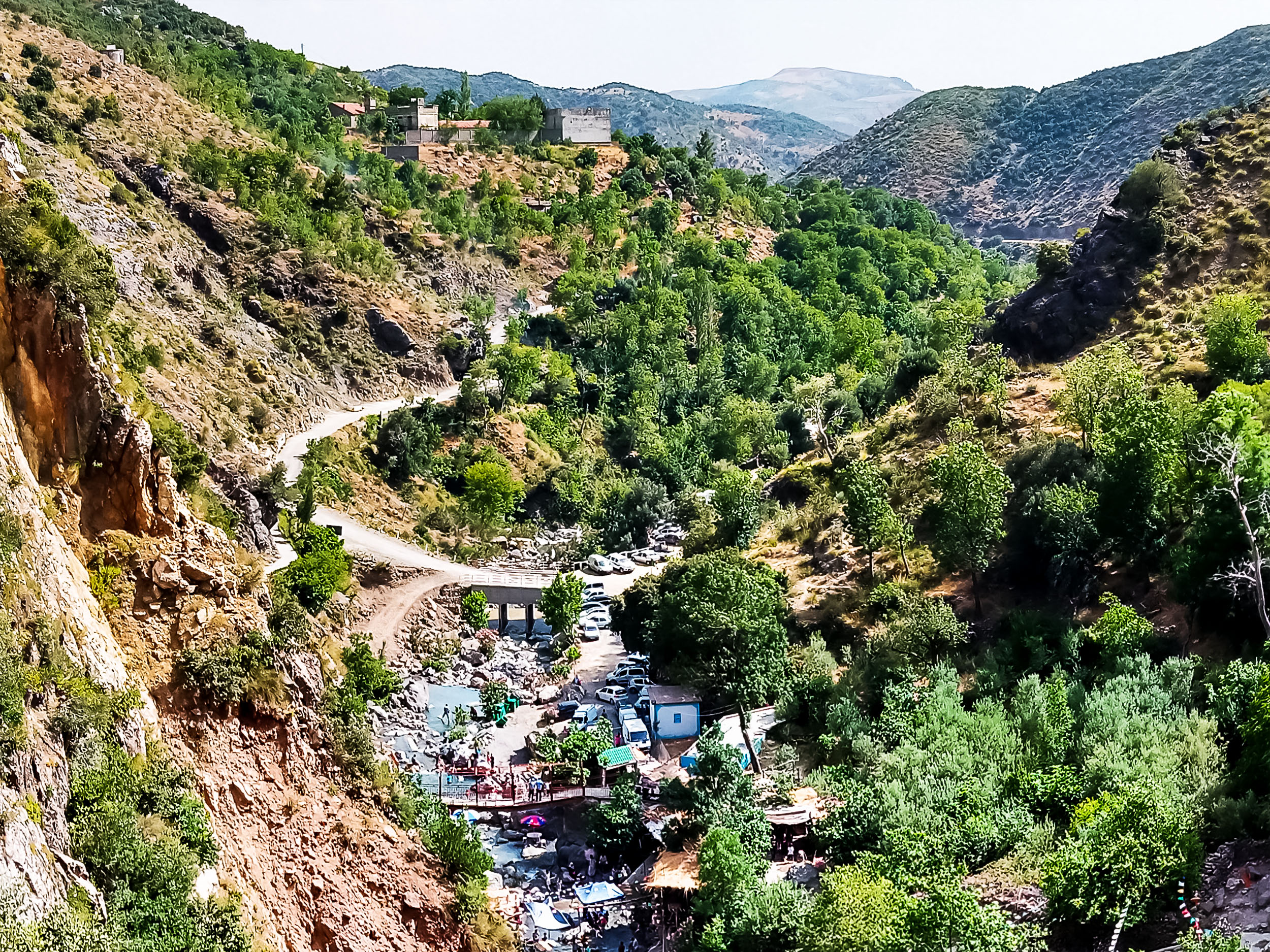
- Interactive map of Oued El Barad
- Country: Algeria
- Province: Sétif Province
- Time zone: UTC+1 (CET)

Oued El Barad is a town and commune in Sétif Province in north-eastern Algeria.
