= Bouandas =

- Commune and town

- Location within Algeria
- Coordinates: 36°29′41″N 5°06′07″E
- Country: Algeria
- Province: Sétif Province
- Time zone: UTC+1 (CET)

Bouandas is a town and commune in Sétif Province in north-eastern Algeria.
