= Ouled Si Ahmed =

Coordinates: 35°54′04″N 5°11′30″E

- Commune and town
- Interactive map of Ouled Si Ahmed
- Country: Algeria
- Province: Setif Province
- Time zone: UTC+1 (CET)

Ouled Si Ahmed is a town and commune in Setif Province in north-eastern Algeria.

The city has the Berber douar khoms and gasmi bousswalim dwibi and other family name.
