= Talaifacene =

- Commune and town

- Location within Algeria
- Coordinates: 36°27′30″N 5°05′20″E
- Country: Algeria
- Province: Sétif Province
- Time zone: UTC+1 (CET)

Talaifacene is a town and commune in Sétif Province in north-eastern Algeria.
