= Ksar El Abtal =

Coordinates: 35.9742°N 5.2881°E

- Commune and town
- Interactive map of Ksar El Abtal
- Country: Algeria
- Province: Sétif Province
- Time zone: UTC+1 (CET)

Ksar El Abtal is a town and commune in Sétif Province in north-eastern Algeria.
