= Aïn Sebt =

Coordinates: 36.4818°N 5.7112°E

- Commune and town
- Interactive map of Aïn Sebt
- Country: Algeria
- Province: Sétif Province
- Time zone: UTC+1 (CET)

Aïn Sebt is a town and commune in Sétif Province in north-eastern Algeria.
