= Tella, Algeria =

Coordinates: 36.0069°N 5.7179°E

Tella
- Commune and town
- Interactive map of Tella
- Country: Algeria
- Province: Sétif Province
- Time zone: UTC+1 (CET)

Tella is a town and commune in Sétif Province in north-eastern Algeria.
