= Djémila District =

Coordinates: 36.3000°N 5.7000°E

- District
- Country: Algeria
- Province: Sétif Province
- Time zone: UTC+1 (CET)

Djémila District is a district of Sétif Province, Algeria.

The district is further divided into 2 municipalities:

- Beni Fouda
- Djémila
