= Draa Kebila =

Coordinates: 36°26′11″N 4°59′44″E

- Commune and town
- Interactive map of Draa Kebila
- Country: Algeria
- Province: Sétif Province
- Time zone: UTC+1 (CET)

Draa Kebila is a town and commune in Sétif Province in north-eastern Algeria.
