= Aïn El Kebira =

Coordinates: 36°21′53″N 5°30′07″E

- City
- Location of Aïn El Kebira within Sétif Province

- Location in Algeria and Africa Aïn El Kebira (Africa)
- Country: Algeria
- Province: Sétif Province
- District: Sétif

Government
  - Body: People's Municipal Assembly
- Time zone: UTC+1 (CET)

Aïn El Kebira (in Arabic: عين الكبيرة, formerly Périgotville) is a city located 27 km north far from Sétif. As Ancient Satafis it was a bishopric, which remains a Catholic titular see.

Ain El Kebira is a daïra (district, part of a vilayet (province), comprising several municipalities) in the Algerian regional classification.

== History ==
The Romans of Djémila used it for entering their dead. Ancient city Satafis was important enough under Roman rule to become a suffragan bishopric in the Roman province of Mauretania Sitifensis.

Inscriptions testify to Christian community cristiana since the early 4th century, including the tomb of local priest Securus.

Four historically documented bishops are attributed to this see :

- An inscription in 324 names Avianus Crescens
- Catholic Adeodatus and his Donatist heretical counterpart Urbanus attended the Council of Carthage held in 411 on that very schism.
- Festus intervened at the synod called in the same Carthage by king Huneric of the Vandal Kingdom in 484, after which he was exiled, like most Catholic bishops.

It faded like most in Roman Africa, presumably at the 7th century advent of Islam.

The modern city was created in the French colonial time under the name of Périgotville.

Its present name "Ain El Kebira" means "the big eye" in Arabic.

== Titular see ==
The diocese was nominally restored in 1933 as titular bishopric of Satafis (Latin and Curiate Italian) / Satafen(sis) in Mauretania Sitifensi (Latin adjective).

It has had the following incumbents, so far of the fitting Episcopal (lowest) rank :

- Antonio Teutonico (1966.03.31 – death 1978.05.31) on emeritate as former Bishop of Aversa (Italy) (1936.07.28 – retired 1966.03.31)
- Franjo Komarica (1985.10.28 – 1989.05.15) as Auxiliary Bishop of Banja Luka (Bosnia and Herzegovina) (1985.10.28 – 1989.05.15); succeeded as Bishop of Banja Luka (Bosnia and Herzegovina) (1989.05.15 – ...), also President of Episcopal Conference of Bosnia and Herzegovina (2002 – 2005 and 2010.04 – 2015.03.20)
- Norberto Eugenio Conrado Martina, Friars Minor (O.F.M.) (1990.11.08 – resigned 1998.03.07) as Military Ordinary of Argentina (Argentina) (1990.11.08 – death 2001.08.28)
- Sergio Alfredo Fenoy (1999.04.03 – 2006.12.05) as Auxiliary Bishop of Rosario (Argentina) (1999.04.03 – 2006.12.05); later Bishop of San Miguel (Argentina) (2006.12.05 – ...)
- Peter Anthony Libasci (2007.04.03 – 2011.09.19) as Auxiliary Bishop of Rockville Centre (USA) (2007.04.03 – 2011.09.19); later Bishop of Manchester (USA) (2011.09.19 – ...)
- Rutilo Felipe Pozos Lorenzini (2013.12.06 – ...) as Auxiliary Bishop of Puebla de los Ángeles (Mexico) (2013.12.06 – ...).

== See also ==
- List of Catholic dioceses in Algeria
- nearby Sitifis, modern Sétif and also a Catholic titular see

== Sources and external links ==
- AinElKebira.com
- Setif.com
- GCatholic - (titular) bishopric

Bibliography - ecclesiastical history

- Pius Bonifacius Gams, Series episcoporum Ecclesiae Catholicae, Leipzig 1931, p. 468
- Stefano Antonio Morcelli, Africa christiana, Volume I, Brescia 1816, pp. 270–271
- J. Mesnage, L'Afrique chrétienne, Paris 1912, p. 350
