= Bir Haddada =

Coordinates: 35°58′N 5°26′E

- Commune and town
- Interactive map of Bir Haddada
- Country: Algeria
- Province: Sétif Province
- Time zone: UTC+1 (CET)

Bir Haddada is a town and commune in Sétif Province in north-eastern Algeria. The population was 20,860 in 2008.
