= Beni Chebana =

Coordinates: 36°27′54″N 4°52′34″E

- Commune and town
- Interactive map of Beni Chebana
- Country: Algeria
- Province: Sétif Province
- Time zone: UTC+1 (CET)

Beni Chebana is a town and commune in Sétif Province in north-eastern Algeria.

== Location ==
It is 250 km from Algiers and 90 km from Sétif.

Its territory covers 1.060 km².
