= Tachouda =

Coordinates: 36°15′45″N 5°42′47″E

- Commune and town
- Interactive map of Tachouda
- Country: Algeria
- Province: Sétif Province
- Time zone: UTC+1 (CET)

Tachouda is a town and commune in Sétif Province in north-eastern Algeria.
