= Aït Naoual Mezada =

Coordinates: 36.54217°N 5.09004°E

Ait Naoual Mezada
- Commune and town
- Interactive map of Ait Naoual Mezada
- Country: Algeria
- Province: Sétif Province
- Time zone: UTC+1 (CET)

Ait Naoual Mezada is a town and commune in Sétif Province in north-eastern Algeria.
