= Hamma, Algeria =

Coordinates: 35°40′50″N 5°22′22″E

Hamma
- Commune and town
- Interactive map of Hamma
- Country: Algeria
- Province: Sétif Province
- Time zone: UTC+1 (CET)

Hamma is a town and commune in Sétif Province in north-eastern Algeria.
