= Maaouia =

Coordinates: 36.38899°N 5.70995°E

- Commune and town
- Interactive map of Maaouia
- Country: Algeria
- Province: Sétif Province
- Time zone: UTC+1 (CET)

Maaouia is a town and commune in Sétif Province in north-eastern Algeria.
