= Taya, Algeria =

Coordinates: 36°28′N 7°07′E

Taya
- Commune and town
- Interactive map of Taya
- Country: Algeria
- Province: Sétif Province
- Time zone: UTC+1 (CET)

Taya is a town and commune in Sétif Province in north-eastern Algeria.
