= Bir El Arch =

Coordinates: 36°08′N 5°50′E

- Commune and town
- Interactive map of Bir El Arch
- Country: Algeria
- Province: Sétif Province
- Time zone: UTC+1 (CET)

Bir El Arch is a town and commune in Sétif Province in north-eastern Algeria.
