= Babor, Sétif =

Coordinates: 36.4904°N 5.5399°E

Babor Ababuṛ بابور
- Commune and town
- Interactive map of Babor
- Country: Algeria
- Province: Sétif Province
- Time zone: UTC+1 (CET)

Babor is a town and commune in Sétif Province in petite Kabylie in north-eastern Algeria.
