= Serdj El Ghoul =

Coordinates: 36.4780°N 5.5771°E

- Commune and town
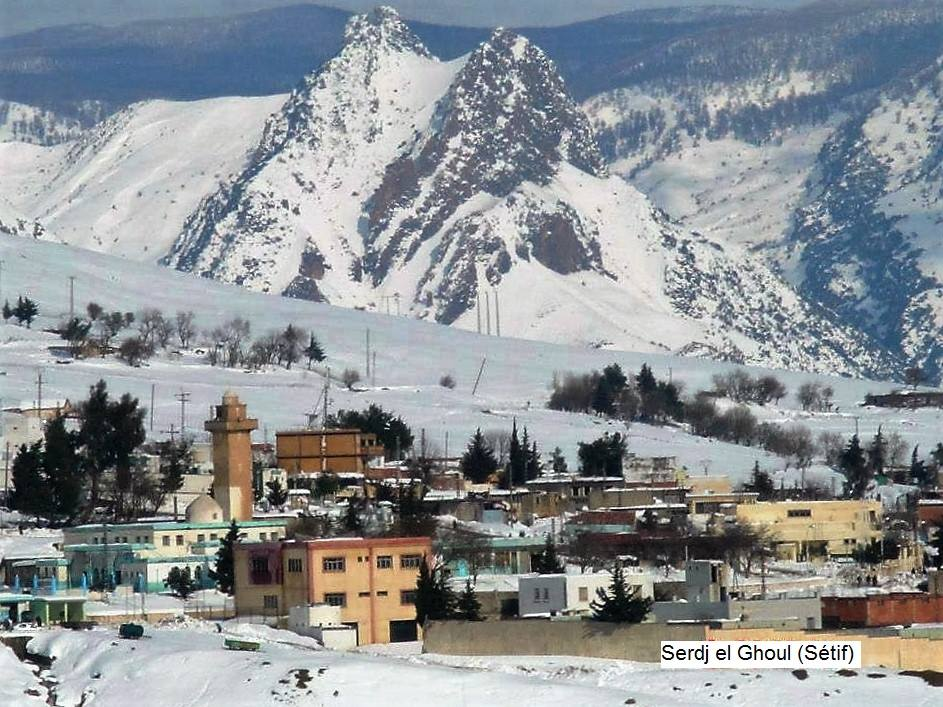
- Serdj El Ghoul
- Interactive map of Serdj El Ghoul
- Country: Algeria
- Province: Sétif Province
- Time zone: UTC+1 (CET)

Serdj El Ghoul is a town and commune in Sétif Province in north-eastern Algeria.
