= Bougaa =

Coordinates: 36°20′N 5°05′E

- Commune and town
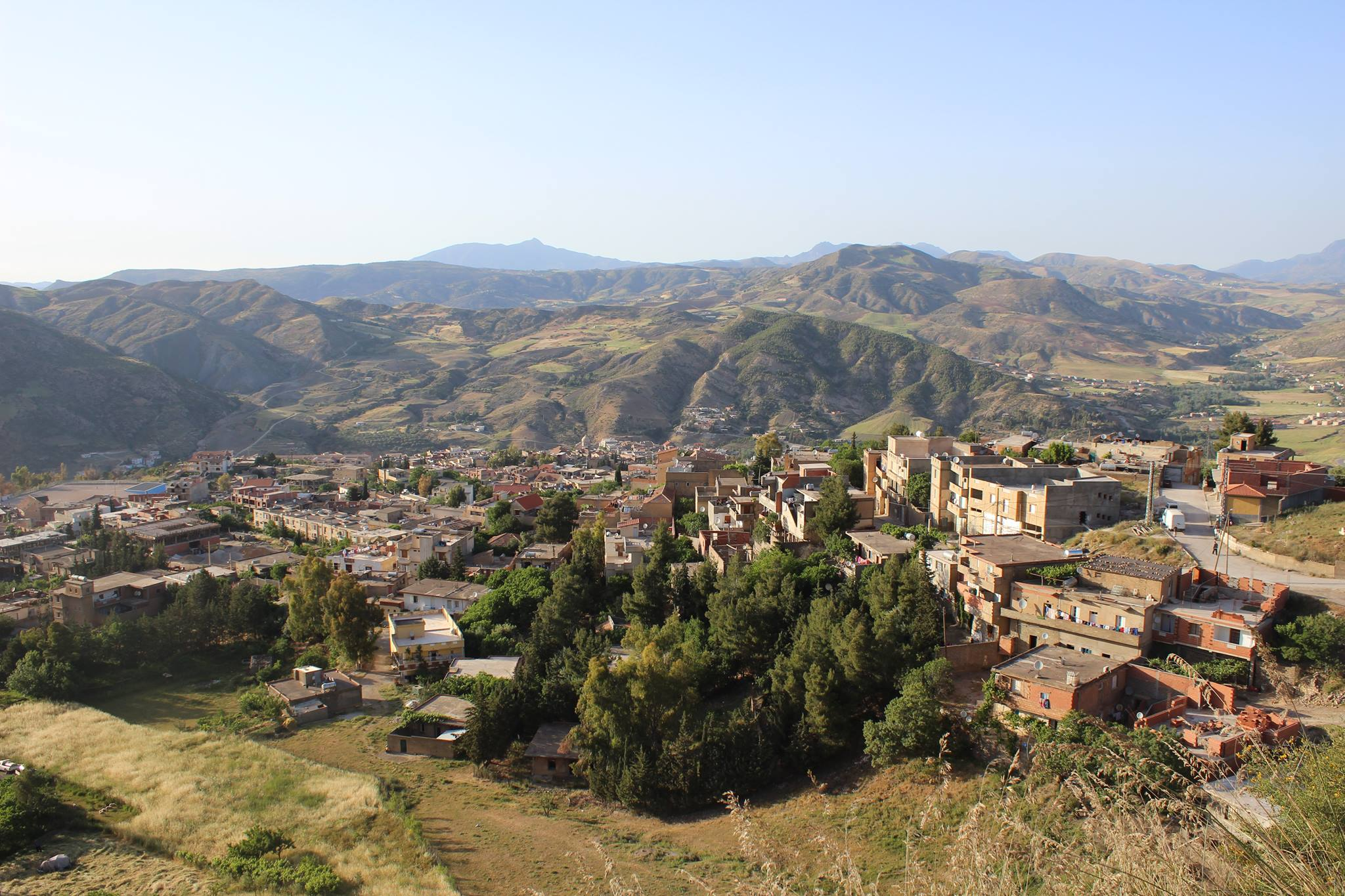
- The city of Bougaa
- Interactive map of Bougaa
- Country: Algeria
- Province: Sétif Province

Population (2008)
  - Total: 31,922
- Time zone: UTC+1 (CET)

Bougaa is a town and commune in Sétif Province in north-eastern Algeria.
