= Beidha Bordj =

Coordinates: 35°53′39″N 5°39′49″E

- Commune and town
- Country: Algeria
- Province: Sétif Province
- Time zone: UTC+1 (CET)

Beidha Bordj is a town and commune in Sétif Province in north-eastern Algeria. The population was 35,276 in 2008.
