= Bazer Sakhra =

Coordinates: 36°04′13″N 5°43′49″E

- Commune and town
- Interactive map of Bazer Sakhra
- Country: Algeria
- Province: Sétif Province
- Time zone: UTC+1 (CET)

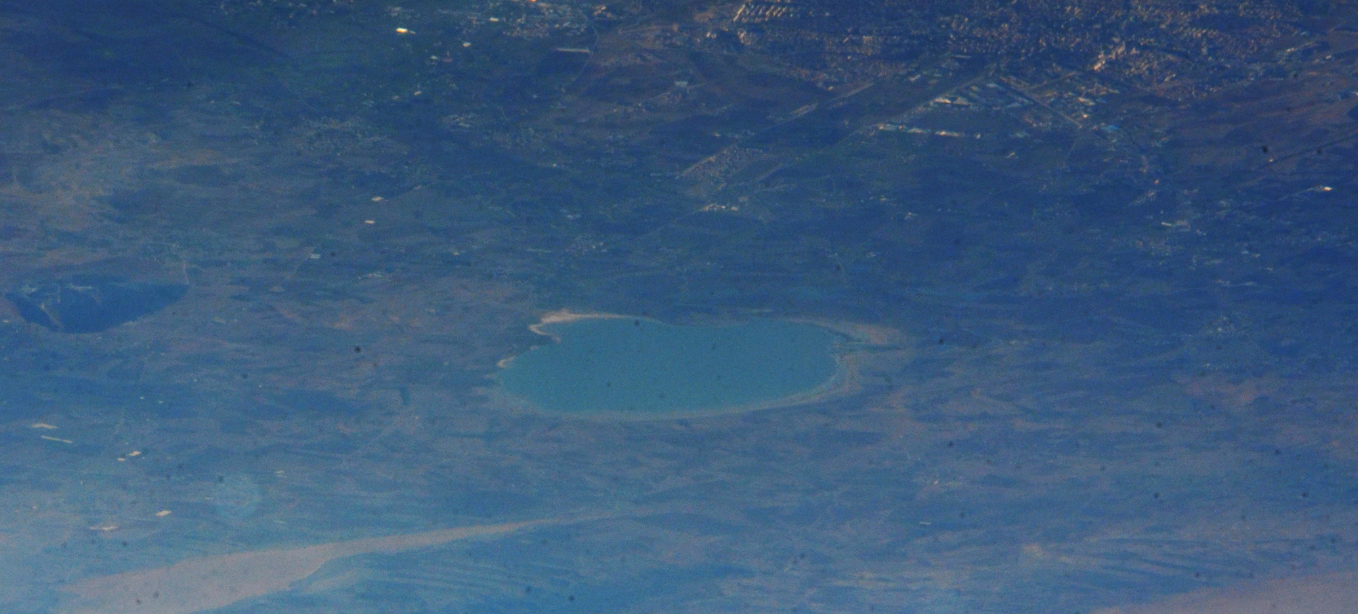
Bazer Sakhra

Bazer Sakhra is a town and commune in Sétif Province in north-eastern Algeria.
