= Aïn Lahdjar =

- Commune and town

- Location within Algeria
- Coordinates: 35°56′N 5°32′E
- Country: Algeria
- Province: Sétif Province
- Time zone: UTC+1 (CET)

Aïn Lahdjar is a town and commune in Sétif Province in north-eastern Algeria. The official language is Arabic. The population was 34,338 in 2008.
