= Aïn Roua =

- Commune and town
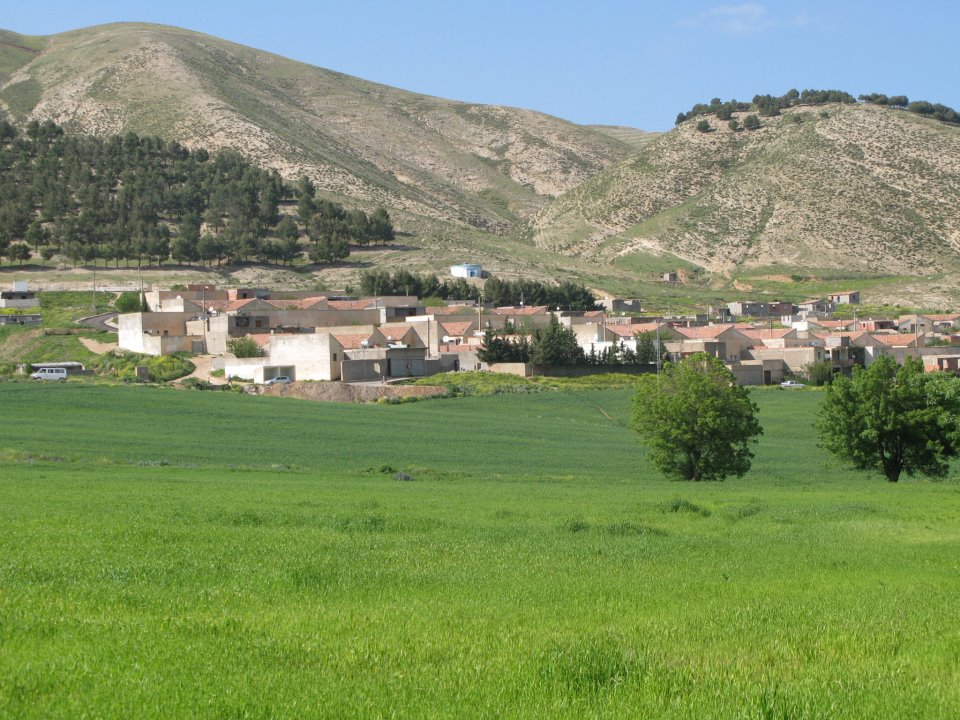

- Location within Algeria
- Country: Algeria
- Province: Sétif Province
- Time zone: UTC+1 (CET)

Aïn Roua is a town and commune in Sétif Province in north-eastern Algeria.
