= Tizi N'Bechar =

Coordinates: 36°25′52″N 5°21′36″E

- Commune and town
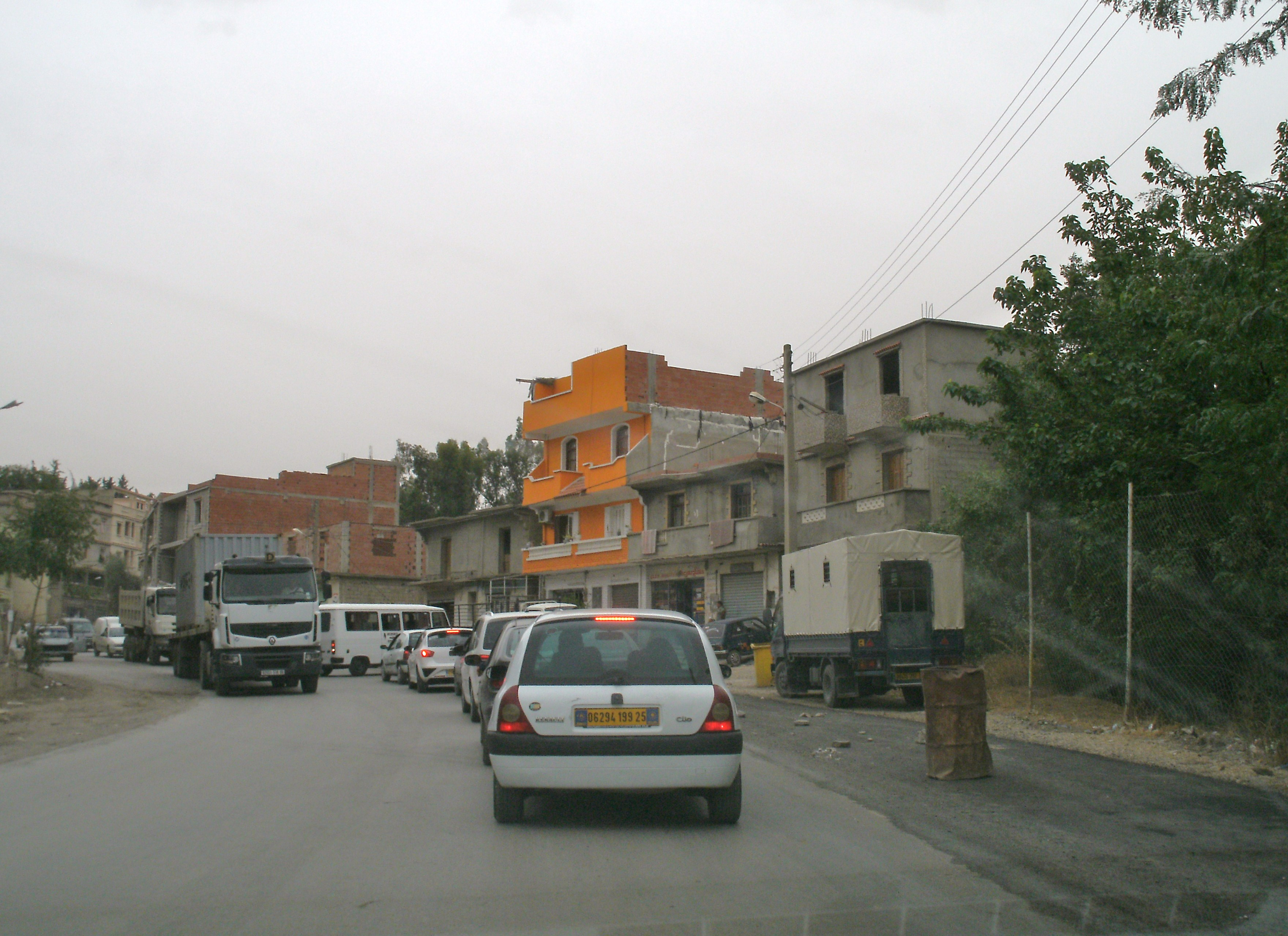
- Interactive map of Tizi N'Bechar
- Country: Algeria
- Province: Sétif Province
- Time zone: UTC+1 (CET)

Tizi N'Bechar is a town and commune in Sétif Province in north-eastern Algeria.
