= Dehamcha =

Coordinates: 36.3821°N 5.5953°E

Dehamcha دهامشة
- Commune and town
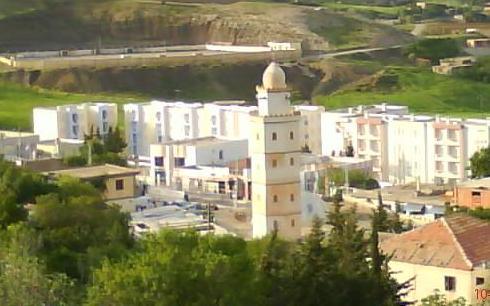
- Dehamcha

- Country: Algeria
- Province: Sétif Province
- Time zone: UTC+1 (CET)

Dehamcha is a town and commune in Sétif Province in north-eastern Algeria.
