= Beni Hocine =

Coordinates: 36°16′20″N 5°07′39″E

- Commune and town
- Interactive map of Beni Hocine
- Country: Algeria
- Province: Sétif Province
- Time zone: UTC+1 (CET)

Beni Hocine is a town and commune in Sétif Province in north-eastern Algeria.
