= Beni Aziz =

Coordinates: 36°28′N 5°39′E

- Commune and town
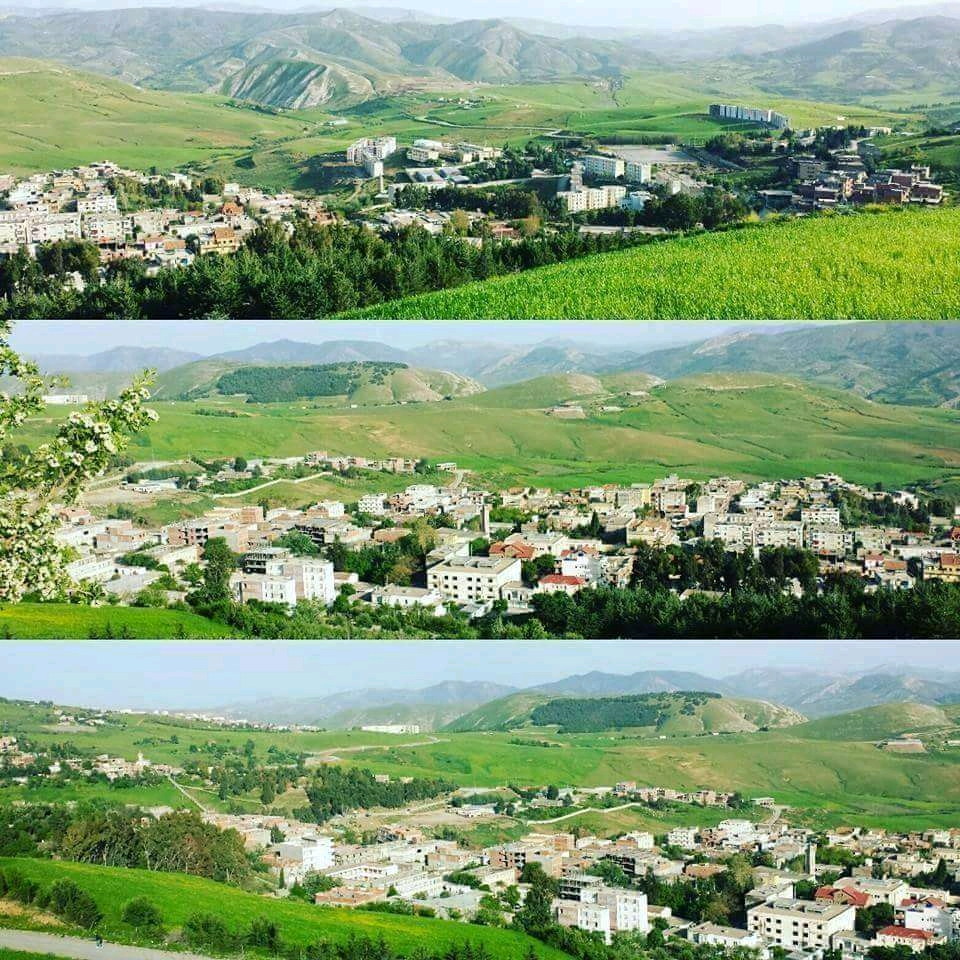
- Interactive map of Beni Aziz
- Country: Algeria
- Province: Sétif Province

Population (1998)
  - Total: 19,383
- Time zone: UTC+1 (CET)

Beni Aziz is a town and commune in Sétif Province in north-eastern Algeria.
