= Ouled Sabor =

Coordinates: 36°09′46″N 5°33′43″E

Ouled Sabor أولاد صابر
- Commune and town
- Location in Sétif Province map
- Country: Algeria
- Province: Sétif Province

Population (2008)
  - Total: 12,510
- Time zone: UTC+1 (CET)

Ouled Sabor is a town and commune in Sétif Province in north-eastern Algeria.
