= Guellal =

Coordinates: 36.0451°N 5.3280°E

- Commune and town
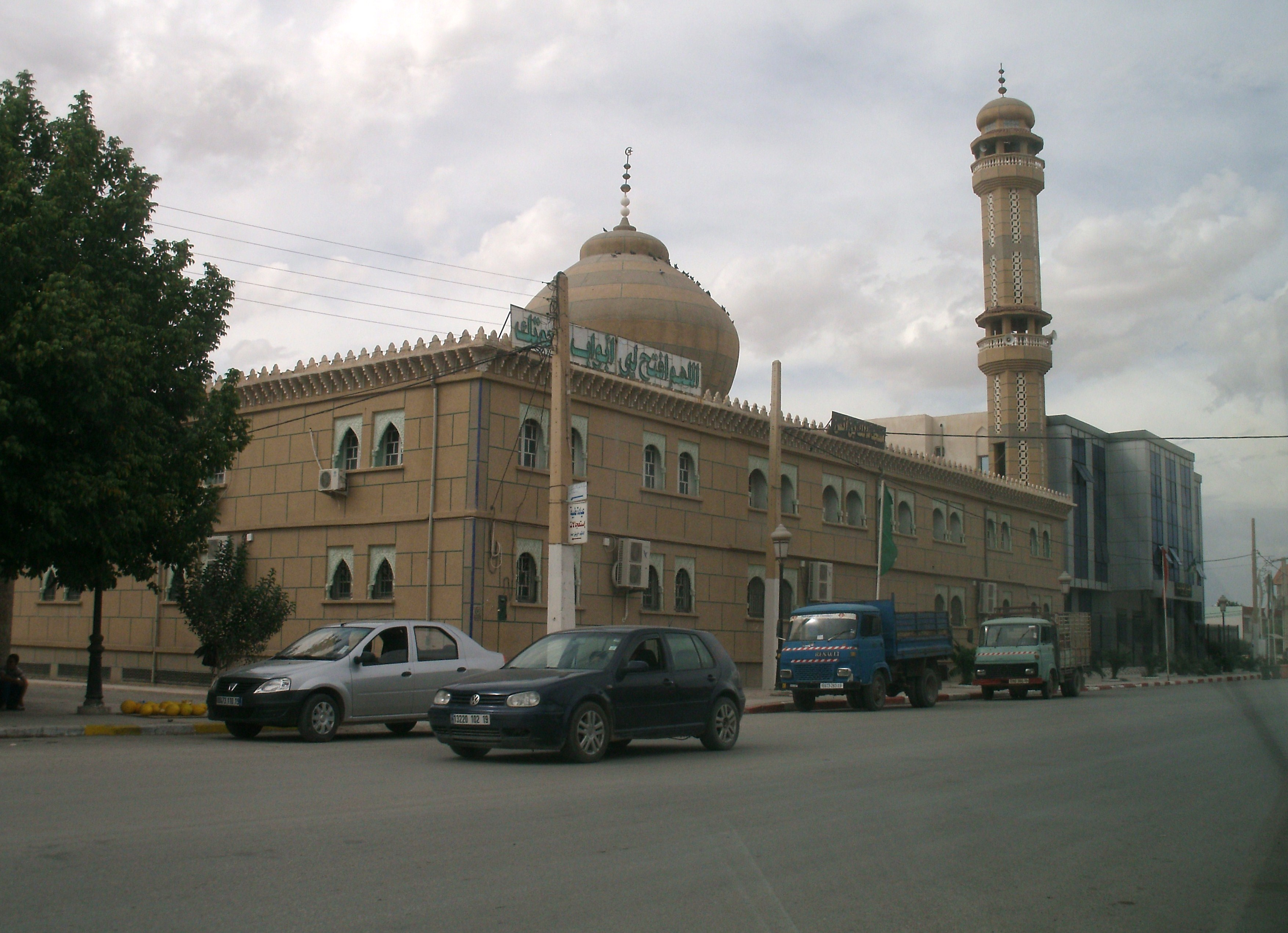
- Interactive map of Guellal
- Country: Algeria
- Province: Sétif Province
- Time zone: UTC+1 (CET)

Guellal is a town and commune in Setif Province in north-eastern Algeria.
