= Guelta Zerka =

Coordinates: 36°12′32″N 5°41′16″E

- Commune and town
- Interactive map of Guelta Zerka
- Country: Algeria
- Province: Sétif Province
- Time zone: UTC+1 (CET)

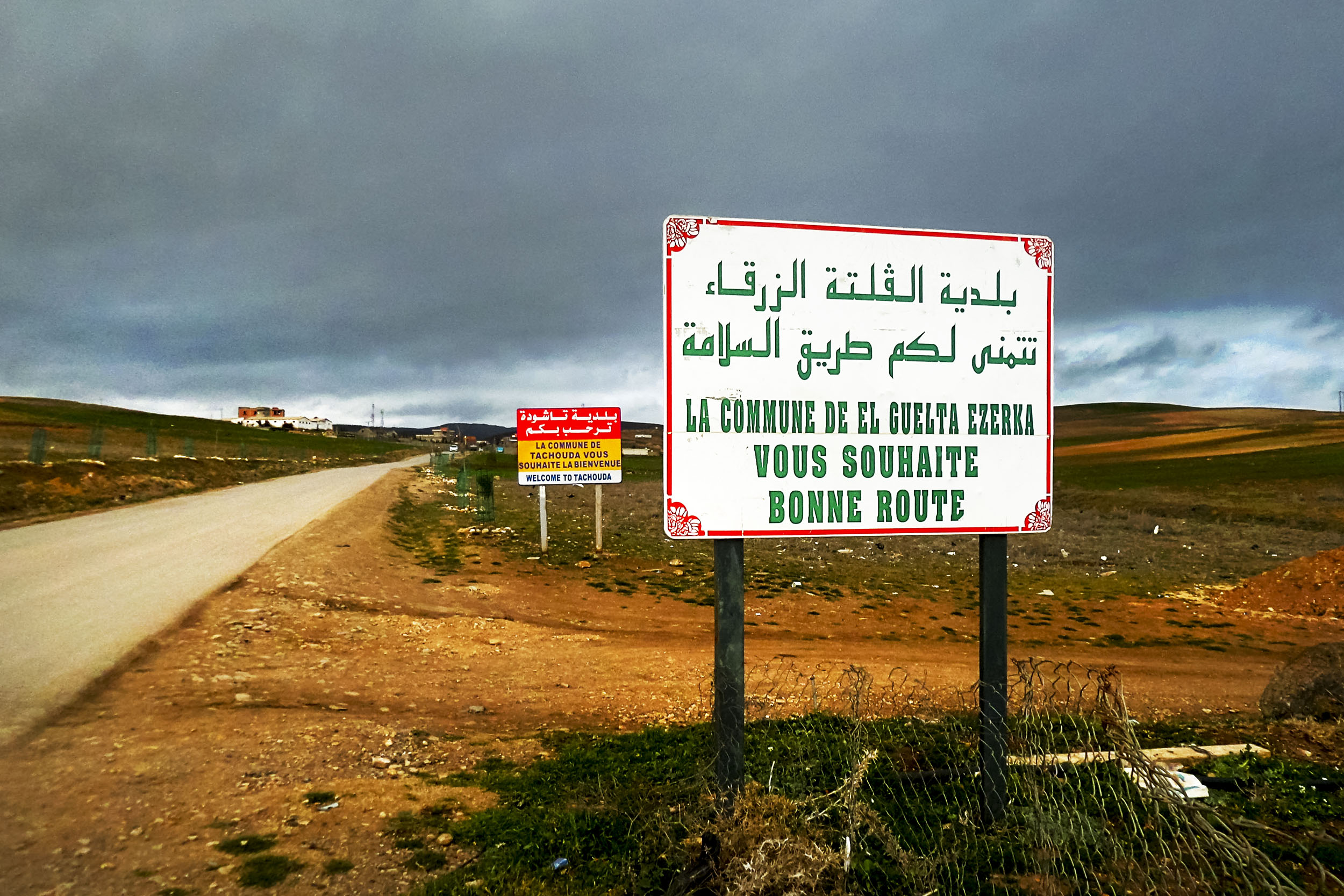
Welcome sign for the commune

Guelta Zerka is a town and commune in Sétif Province in north-eastern Algeria.
