= Guenzet =

Coordinates: 36°19′N 4°50′E

- Commune and town
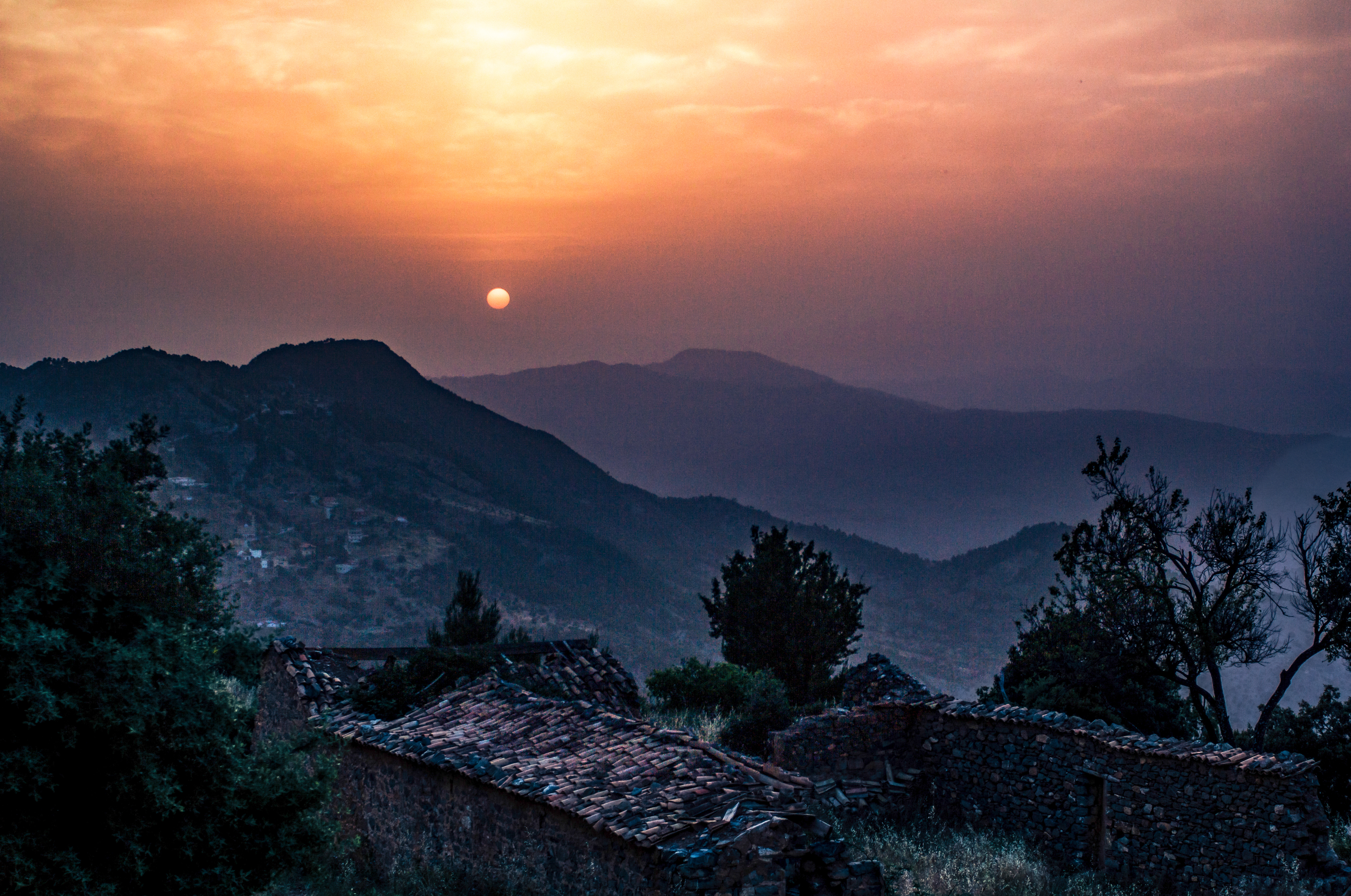
- Guenzeti naplemente
- Interactive map of Guenzet
- Country: Algeria
- Province: Sétif Province
- Time zone: UTC+1 (CET)

Guenzet is a town and commune in Sétif Province in north-eastern Algeria.
