= Ouled Addouane =

Coordinates: 36.3401°N 5.4745°E

- Commune and town
- Interactive map of Ouled Addouane
- Country: Algeria
- Province: Sétif Province
- Time zone: UTC+1 (CET)

Ouled Addouane is a town and commune in Sétif Province in north-eastern Algeria.
