= Hammam Guergour =

Coordinates: 36°19′N 5°04′E

- Commune and town
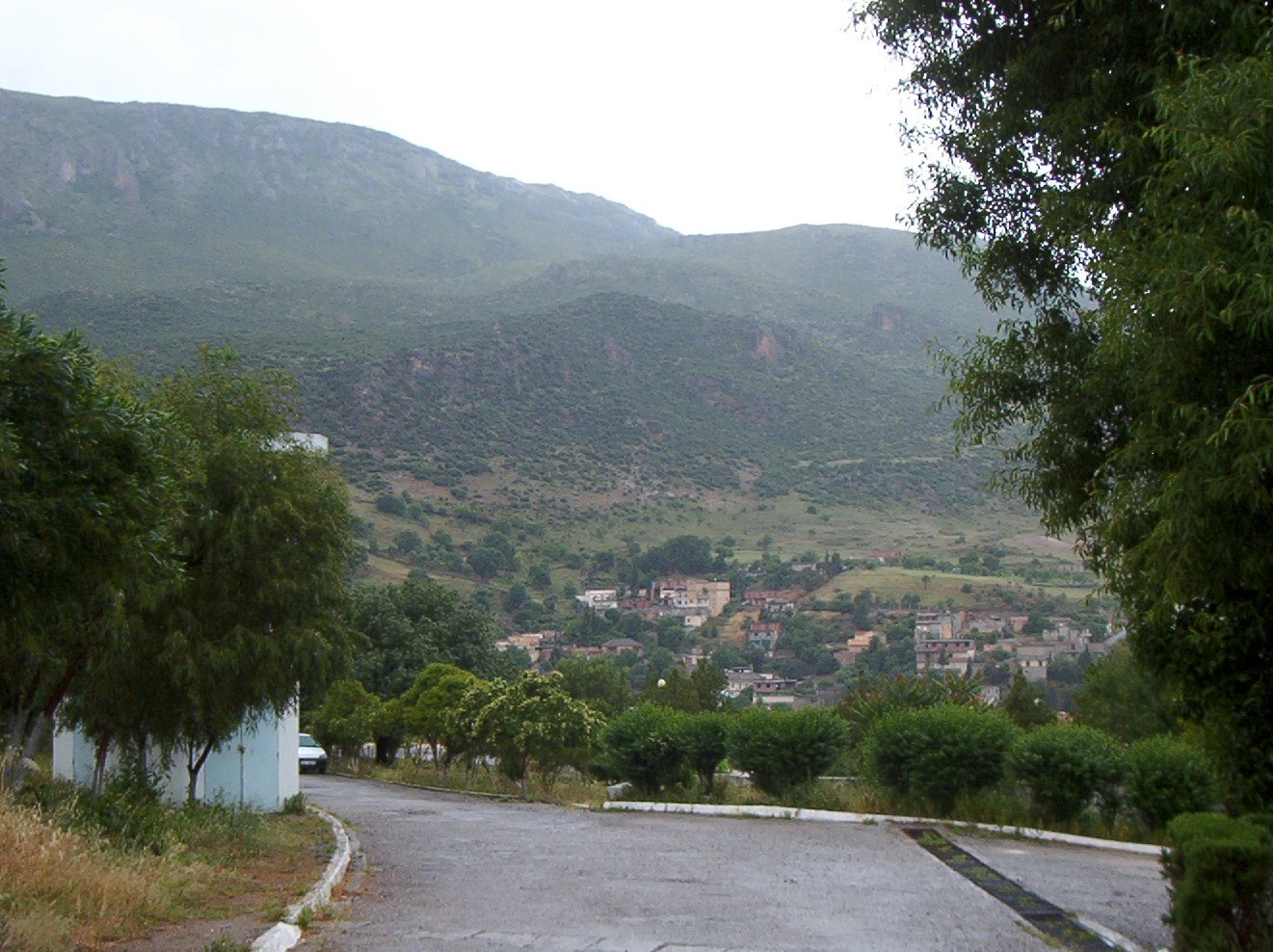

- Country: Algeria
- Province: Sétif Province
- Time zone: UTC+1 (CET)

Hammam Guergour is a town and commune in Sétif Province in north-eastern Algeria.
