= Aïn Abessa =

Coordinates: 36°18′00″N 5°17′42″E

- Commune and town
- Interactive map of Aïn Abessa
- Country: Algeria
- Province: Sétif Province
- Time zone: UTC+1 (CET)

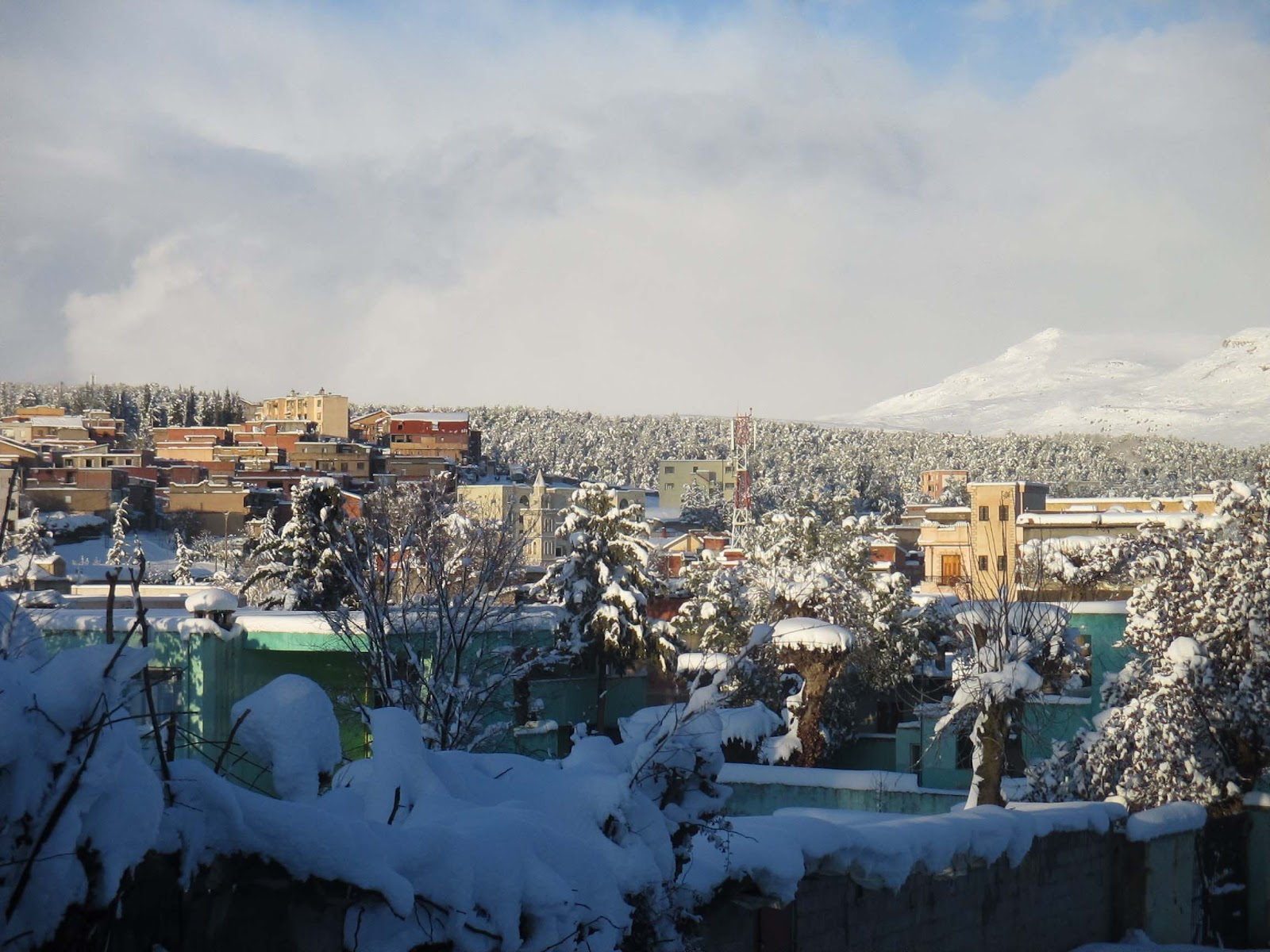

Aïn Abessa is a town and commune in Sétif Province in north-eastern Algeria.
