= Boutaleb, Algeria =

Coordinates: 35.66024°N 5.32103°E

Boutaleb
- Commune and town
- Interactive map of Boutaleb
- Country: Algeria
- Province: Setif Province
- Time zone: UTC+1 (CET)

Boutaleb is a town and commune in Setif Province in north-eastern Algeria.

The city contains is an Arab tribe (Ahl Boutaleb) from the Ayad, a branch of the Banu Hilal.
