= Beni Fouda =

- Commune and town

- Location within Algeria
- Coordinates: 36.2860726°N 5.6071472°E
- Country: Algeria
- Province: Sétif Province
- Time zone: UTC+1 (CET)

Beni Fouda is a town and commune in Sétif Province in north-eastern Algeria.

According to census 2008, it has a population of 17,667.
