= Guidjel =

Coordinates: 36°07′N 5°32′E

- Commune and town
- Country: Algeria
- Province: Sétif Province
- Time zone: UTC+1 (CET)

Guidjel is a town and commune in Sétif Province in north-eastern Algeria. In April 2008, it had a registered population of 33,685 inhabitants.
