= Sétif Province =

Province of Algeria

Sétif Province ولاية سطيف ⴰⴳⴻⵣⴷⵓ ⵙⵟⵉⴼ
- Province
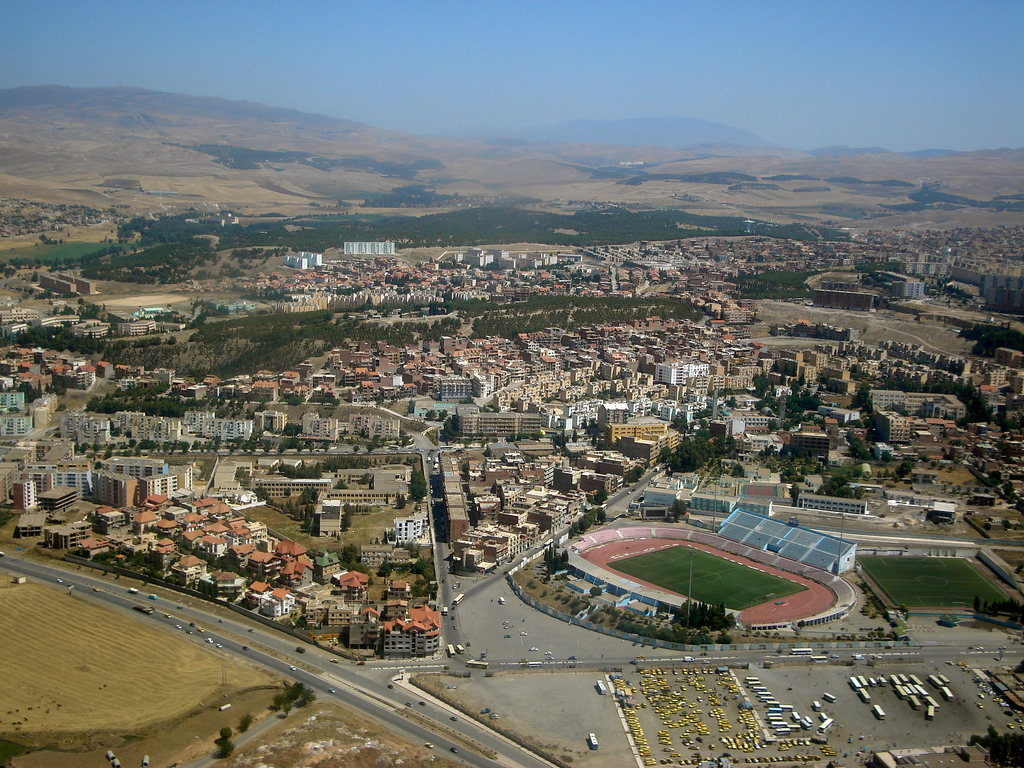

- Map of Algeria highlighting Sétif
- Coordinates: 36°11′N 5°24′E
- Country: Algeria
- Capital: Sétif

Government
  - PPA president: Naima Farhi (2007–2012)

Area
  - Total: 6,504 km^{2} (2,511 sq mi)

Population (2008)
  - Total: 1,496,150
  - Density: 230.0/km^{2} (595.8/sq mi)
- Time zone: UTC+01 (CET)
- Area code: +213 (0) 36
- ISO 3166 code: DZ-19
- Districts: 20
- Municipalities: 60
- Website: www.wilayasetif.dz

Sétif Province (Arabic: ولاية سطيف, Kabyle: ⴰⴳⴻⵣⴷⵓ ⵙⵟⵉⴼ) is a province (wilaya) in north-eastern Algeria. Its capital and largest city is Sétif and the next largest city is El Eulma. The World Heritage Site of Djémila is also located there.

== History ==
In 1984 Bordj Bou Arréridj Province and Mila Province were carved out of its territory.

== Administrative divisions ==
The province is divided into 20 districts (daïras), which are further divided into 60 communes or municipalities.

=== Districts ===
- Aïn Arnat
- Aïn Azel
- Aïn El Kébira
- Aïn Oulmane
- Amoucha
- Babor
- Béni Aziz
- Béni Ourtilane
- Bir El Arch
- Bouandas
- Bougaâ
- Djémila
- El Eulma
- Guenzet
- Guidjel
- Hammam Guergour
- Hammam Souhna
- Maoklane
- Salah Bey
- Sétif

=== Communes ===
- Aïn Abessa
- Aïn Arnat
- Aïn Azel
- Aïn El Kébira
- Aïn Azel
- Aïn Lahdjar
- Aïn Legraj
- Aïn Oulmane
- Aïn Roua
- Aïn Sebt
- Aït Naoual Mezada
- Aït Tizi
- Amoucha
- Babor
- Bazer Sakhra
- Beidha Bordj
- Belaa
- Béni Aziz
- Beni Chebana
- Beni Fouda
- Beni Hocine
- Béni Ourtilane
- Bir El Arch
- Bir Haddada
- Bouandas
- Bougaâ
- Bousselam
- Boutaleb
- Dehamcha
- Djémila
- Draa Kebila
- El Eulma
- El Ouldja
- El Ouricia
- Guellal
- Guelta Zerka
- Guenzet
- Guidjel
- Hamma
- Hammam Guergour
- Harbil
- Ksar El Abtal
- Maaouia
- Maoklane
- Mezloug
- Oued El Barad
- Ouled Addouane
- Ouled Sabor
- Ouled Si Ahmed
- Ouled Tebben
- Oum Ladjoul
- Rasfa
- Salah Bey
- Serdj El Ghoul
- Sétif
- Tachouda
- Talaifacene
- Tamazirt (city)
- Taya
- Tella
- Tizi N'Bechar

== See also ==
- South Righa - a historical region of Sétif Province
- Muqras Mountain
