= El Ouricia =

Coordinates: 36°17′N 5°24′E

- Commune and town
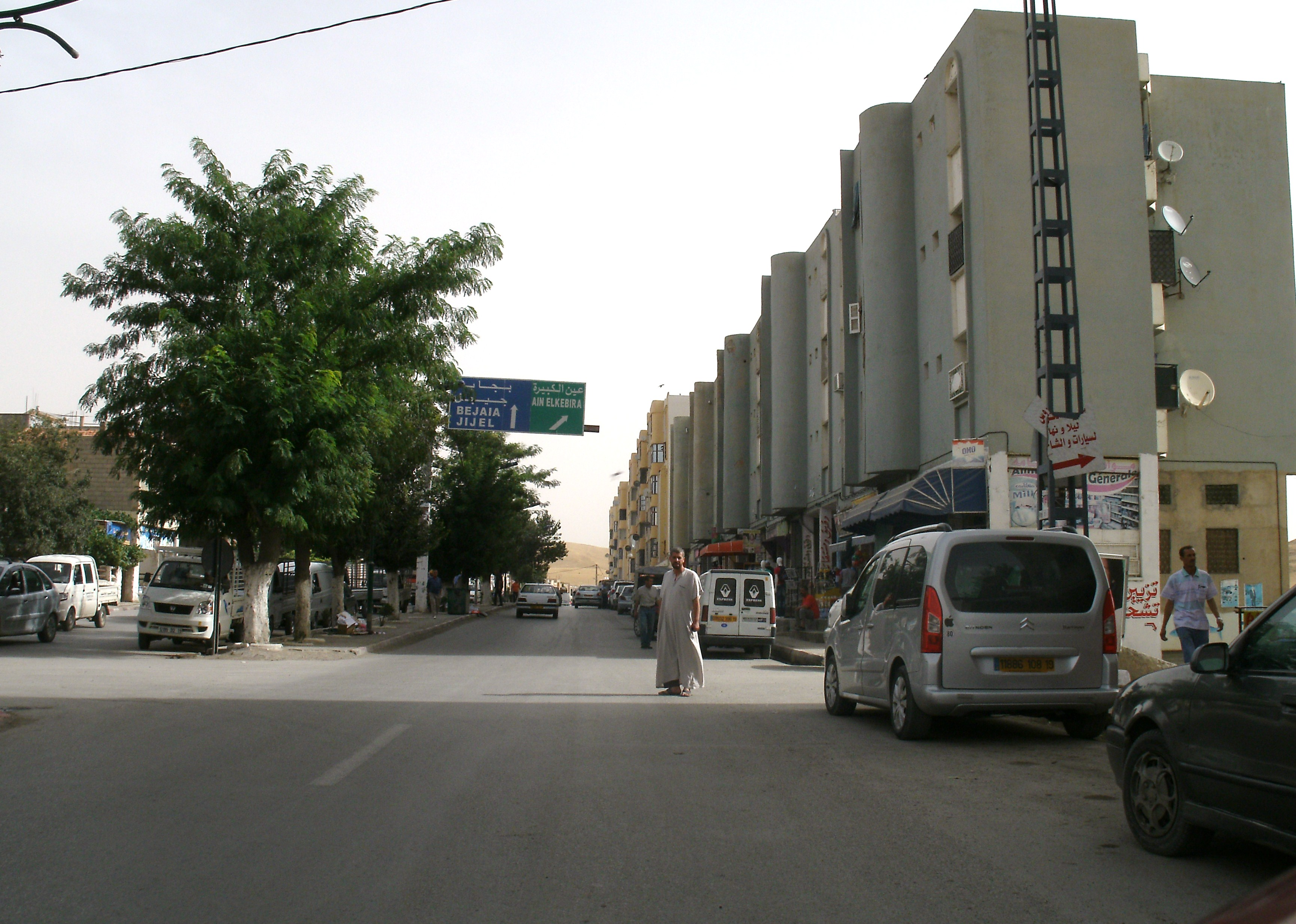
- Interactive map of El Ouricia
- Country: Algeria
- Province: Sétif Province
- Time zone: UTC+1 (CET)

El Ouricia is a town and commune in Sétif Province in north-eastern Algeria.
