= Mezloug =

Coordinates: 36°07′N 5°20′E

- Commune and town
- Interactive map of Mezloug
- Country: Algeria
- Province: Sétif Province
- Time zone: UTC+1 (CET)

Mezloug is a town and commune in Sétif Province in north-eastern Algeria.
