= 43rd Infantry Regiment (France) =

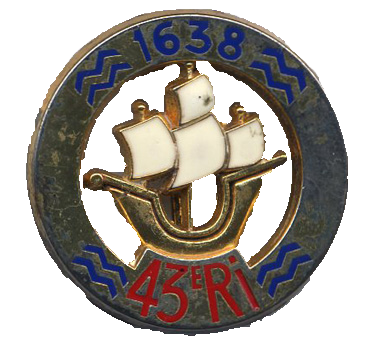
- Insignia of the 43rd Infantry Regiment
- Active: 13 March 1638–31 December 2010
- Country: France
- Branch: French Army
- Type: Infantry
- Garrison/HQ: Lille
- Nickname: Le Royal des Vaisseaux
- Anniversaries: Saint Maurice
- Engagements: Valmy 1792; Marengo 1800; Austerlitz 1805; Jena 1806; Zaatcha 1849; Sevastopol 1855; The Somme 1916; Flanders 1917; L'Aisne 1918; Algeria 1952-1962
- Decorations: Croix de guerre 1914–1918 three palms Croix de guerre des Théâtres d'opérations extérieurs one palm Gold Medal of the City of Milan (Italian Campaign 1859: Solferino, Palestro, and Magenta)

The 43rd Infantry Regiment (French: 43e Régiment d'Infanterie or 43e RI) was a French infantry regiment which dated back to the creation in 1638 of the Régiment Royal des Vaisseaux - one of the regiments of the Maison militaire du roi de France (Royal Military House of France) created to serve on boats and in the colonies: all such regiments were, in 1791, given a number in the line-infantry order of battle meaning that they could be considered historically as the "ancestors" of the naval infantry regiments (see 107th Infantry Regiment (France)).

== Creation and Evolution ==
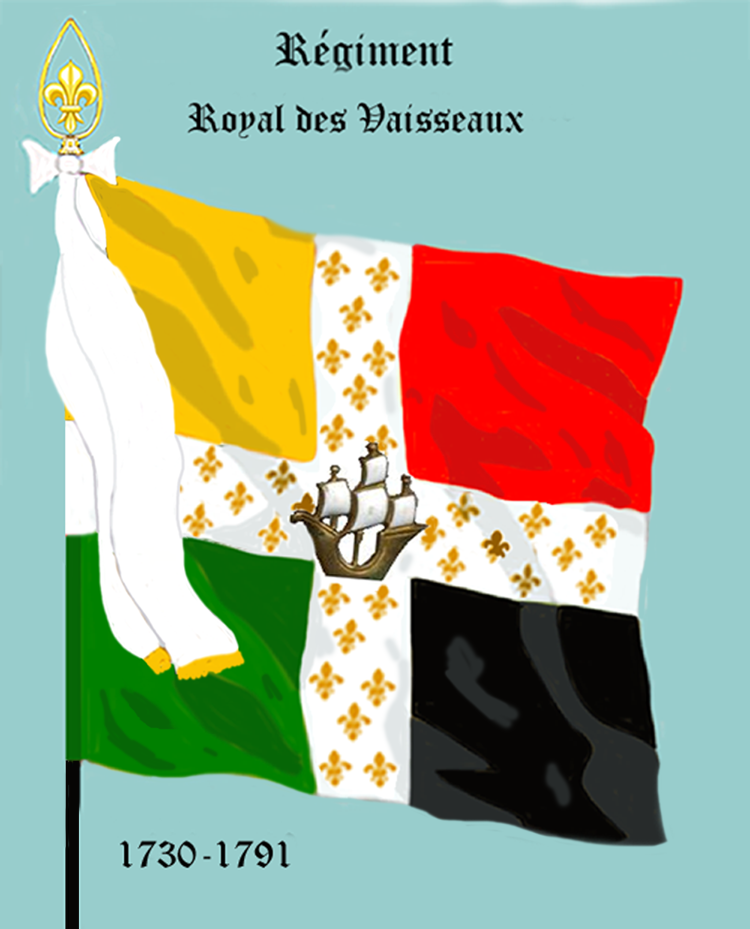
Colors of the Régiment des Vaisseaux (1730-1791) (Previously without stars or ship)

=== Ancien Régime ===
- 13 March 1638: Creation of the Régiment des Vaisseaux
- 3 February 1640: became the Régiment des Vaisseaux-Richelieu
- 10 March 1644: became the Régiment des Vaisseaux-Mazarin
- 25 June 1650: then the Régiment des Vaisseaux-Candale
- 11 April 1658: reverted to Régiment des Vaisseaux-Mazarin
- 15 mars 1661: renamed Régiment des Vaisseaux-Provence
- 20 September 1669: renamed Régiment Royal des Vaisseaux (alias Royal-Vaisseaux)

=== The Revolution and the First Empire ===
- 1 January 1791: renamed 43rd Infantry Regiment of the Line
- 1793: formation of the 43rd half-brigade of battle infantry, from the following units:
  - 1st battalion of the 22nd Infantry Regiment
  - 4th battalion of volunteers from Seine-et-Oise
  - 3rd battalion of volunteers from Lot
- 16 April 1794 : the 1st battalion was reformed by incorporation to the 85th Battle Demi-Brigade (French: 85^{e} demi-brigade de bataille) during the formation of the demi-brigade.
- 1794 : reformation, the 2nd battalion being incorporated to the 86th Battle Demi-Brigade (French: 86^{e} demi-brigade de bataille) during the formation of the demi-brigade.
- 20 February 1796: formation of the 43rd half-brigade of Infantry of the Line, out of the following units:
  - 34th half-brigade of battle infantry - itself composed of the following units:
    - 2nd battalion of the 17th Infantry Regiment of the Line
    - 3rd battalion of volunteers from Moselle
    - 5th battalion of volunteers from Meurthe
  - 3rd battalion of the 149th Infantry Regiment
- 24 September 1803: 43rd Infantry Regiment of the Line

=== The Bourbon Restoration and the July Monarchy ===
- 1815: disbanded
- 1816: recreated with the name: Legion of Loiret
- 6 December 1820: At Brest, takes the name of 43rd Regiment of Infantry of the Line with two battalions from the 16th Legion of Charente-Inférieure and the 48th Legion of the English Channel
- 1 May 1823: a third battalion is created

=== Second Empire ===
==== Franco-Prussian War of 1870 ====
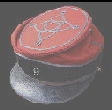
A Kepi or Cap for the Infantry of the Line

On 1 August 1870 the 43rd Infantry Regiment was part of the Army of the Rhine.

With the 5th Battalion of chasseurs under Commandant Carré and the 13th Infantry Regiment under Colonel Lion, the 43rd formed the 1st brigade under the orders of General Véron called Bellecourt.

This 1st brigade together with the 2nd brigade under General Pradier, two batteries of 4 guns and one machine-gun, and one company of engineers constituted the 2nd division of infantry commanded by Major-General Grenier.

This division operated under the IVth Army Corps commanded by Major-General de Ladmirault.

On 16 August 1870 the 4th battalion, formed mostly from new arrivals, left the depot to create the 8th March Regiment which formed the 2nd brigade of the 1st division of the XIIIth Army Corps

Detailed article
March battalion

=== Third Republic ===
- 1914: 43rd Regiment of Infantry
- August 1914: At mobilisation a reserve regiment was set up: the 243rd Infantry Regiment
- 2 August 1914 to 26 October 1916: assigned to the 1st Infantry Division
- 26 October 1916 to 7 January 1919: assigned to the 162nd Infantry Division
- 8 January 1919 to the end of the war: reassigned to the 1st Infantry Division
- 1939: 43rd Motorised Infantry Regiment
- 1 September 1940: 43rd Alpine Infantry Regiment of the Army of the Armistice
- 11 November 1942 to 29 April 1943: progressive dissolution

=== Fourth and Fifth Republics ===
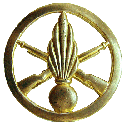
Insignia on the Infantry Berets

- 16 September 1944: creation of the 43rd Infantry Regiment of the Liberation at Lille
- 12 January 1945: 43rd Infantry Regiment to be disbanded on 1 April 1945
- 12 April 1947: 43rd Battalion of Infantry
- 1 January 1949: Regiment of Infantry
- 12 February 1949: 43rd Half-Brigade of Infantry composed of:
  - 43rd Battalion of Infantry
  - 16th Battalion of Foot chasseurs
- 1 March 1954: 43rd Regiment of Infantry
- 12 September 1956: departed for Morocco.
- 1 May 1958: The Training Centre and depot of the 43rd Infantry Regiment became the Training centre for the 43rd RI
- 24 November 1959: Colonel Andrès restored the flag to the 3/43rd Infantry Regiment (Battalion of tradition).
- 18 September 1962: Battalion Commander Parouty raised the flag at the Fort of Vincennes.
- 29 February 1964: The Training Centre of the 43rd Infantry Regiment is disbanded.
- 1 March 1964: The re-creation of the 43rd Infantry Regiment.
- 4 April 1964: The Regiment receives its flag.
- 1978: The Regiment is integrated with the 12th division of Infantry comprising 6 companies (1 Command & Support Company (CCS), 3 Combat Companies, and 2 Training Companies)
- 1984: 43rd Infantry and Army Corps Command Regiment (43rd RICCA); comprising 5 companies (1 CCS Company, 3 CQG Companies, 1 Training company)
- 1 September 1991: 43rd Infantry Regiment
- 2002: Reorganisation of the 43rd Infantry Regiment with establishment in 2 cities (Lille and Douai); composed of 7 companies (2 Command, Support, and Services Company (CCAS), 3 Support for Command (CAC)Companies, 2 Reserve Companies)
- 2005: New reorganisation with a single garrison in Lille of 3 companies (1 Command and Logistics Company (CCL), 1 CAC, 1 Reserve Company). The garrison at Douai became the 6th RCS.
- 31 December 2010: dissolution of the 43rd Infantry Regiment
- 1 January 2011: Becomes the Base Defence Support Group (GSBdD) of Lille, an inter-service body under the Chief of Defence Staff (EMA) which provides general administrative and common support tasks for the benefit of all Ministry of Defence and Veterans units based in the departments of Nord and Pas de Calais. The GSBdD is entrusted with the custody of the Flag and the Hall of Honour of the 43rd Infantry Regiment.

== Regimental Commanders ==
=== Ancien Régime ===
- 13 March 1638: Henri d'Escoubleau de Sourdis (Archbishop of Bordeaux)
- 3 February 1640: Cardinal Richelieu
- 10 March 1644: Cardinal Jules Mazarin
- 25 June 1650: Louis Charles Gaston de Nogaret de Foix, Duke of Candale
- 15 March 1661: Louis de Vendôme, Duke of Mercœur
- 20 September 1667: Alexandre Le Bret (died a Lieutenant-General)
- 29 March 1679: Louis Potier de Gesvres, Marquis of Gandelus (died of his wounds)
- 24 April 1689: Count Louis de Mailly (died of his wounds)
- 29 April 1692: Marquis René de Névet
- 16 June 1699: Hyacinthe de Montvalat, Knight of Entragues (killed in action)
- 1 March 1702: Isaac Charles de la Rochefoucaud, Count of Montendre (killed in action)
- 27 August 1702: Louis de Régnier, Marquis of Guerchy
- 14 June 1705: Thomas Le Gendre de Collandre
- 6 March 1719: Pierre-Aimé de Guiffrey, Count of Marcieu
- 25 November 1734: Claude Louis François de Régnier, Count of Guerchy
- 26 May 1745: Jean-Baptiste Charles Hubert d'Esparbès de Lussan, Knight of Aubeterre (killed in action)
- 21 February 1746: Louis Henri d'Esparbès de Lussan, Count of Aubeterre-La Serre (died of his wounds)
- 7 August 1747: François Emmery de Durfort, Count of Civrac (Marshal of Camps on 20 February 1761)
- 30 November 1761: Marquis Anne Pierre de Montesquiou (Army Brigadier on 20 April 1768)
- 28 July 1773: Charles Pierre Hyacinthe, Count of Ossun (Marshal of Camps on 9 March 1788)
- 10 March 1788: Frédéric Séraphin de la Tour du Pin-Paulin, Marquis of Gouvernet (son of Jean-Frédéric de la Tour du Pin)

=== Revolution and Empire ===
- 21 October 1791: Colonel Joseph-Marie Rogon De Kerkaradec
- 16 May 1792: Colonel Anselme De Sicard (fled to the Netherlands due to his connection to Louis XVI on 20 August 1792)
- 4 September 1792: Colonel François de Vergès (*)
- 1794: Brigadier Louis-Prix Varé (*)
- 1796: Brigadier Barrere (?)
- 13 August 1799: Brigadier Baptiste Pierre Bisson (**); appointed General on 5 July 1800
- 5 July 1800: Brigadier Raymond Viviès (*), promoted Brigadier-General on 24 December 1805
- 1805: Colonel Yves Lemarois
- 10 May 1807: Colonel Jean-Claude Baussin
- 19 May 1811: Colonel Antoine Devez
- 23 January 1813: Colonel Nicolas Jacquemard (*)
- 2 July 1813: Colonel Jean-Pierre René Stanislas Weller de Chef du Bois

(*) Officers who became Brigadier-Generals after their command. (**) Officers who reached the rank of Major-General

Colonels killed and/or wounded during their command of the 43rd Infantry Regiment:

- Colonel Le Marois: killed on 8 February 1807
- Colonel Baussin: wounded on 10 June 1807, killed on 27 February 1811
- Colonel Devez: killed on 14 April 1812
- Colonel Weller de Chef du Bois: wounded on 13 October 1813 then again on 10 November 1813

Officers killed and/or wounded while serving in the 43rd Infantry Regiment between 1804 and 1815:

- Officers killed: 42
- Officers who died of their wounds: 18
- Officers wounded: 182

=== The Restoration, July Monarchy, Second Empire, Third Republic until the First World War ===
- 17 November 1820: Genty
- 14 November 1821: Gérard
- 7 February 1823: De La Tour du Pin de La Charce
- 16 August 1830: Janin
- 14 April 1831: Lacretelle
- 29 September 1837: Massoni
- 16 April 1843: Cornille
- 11 April 1843: Lorenton-Dumontet
- 7 January 1852: Douay
- 23 October 1852: de Martimprey
- 5 September 1854: Broutta
- 12 July 1859: Jeanningros
- 12 March 1862: Wolff
- 1 May 1870: De Viville
- 23 August 1879: Mathieu
- 13 March 1883: De Ricouard d'Hérouville
- 6 May 1887: Jacquey
- 9 April 1892: De Courson de la Villeneuve
- 29 December 1897: Guelle
- 4 June 1903: Bizard
- 22 December 1906: De Lartigue
- 27 September 1911: Proye

=== First World War ===
- 23 September 1912 - ?: Colonel Paul Maistre
- 2 to 29 August 1914: Colonel Proye
- 31 August to 6 September 1914: Lieutenant-colonel Baston
- 14 September to 6 December 1914: Lieutenant-colonel Lapointe
- 6 December 1914 to 8 January 1915: Colonel Proye
- 8 January 1915 to 24 April 1917: Lieutenant-colonel Lapointe
- 25 April to 4 May 1917: Squadron Leader Marthe
- 4 May to 12 June 1917: Lieutenant-colonel Nenig
- 24 June 1917: Lieutenant-colonel Carrot

=== Between the Wars ===
- 24 May 1921: Rat
- 14 April 1923: Merx
- 16 March 1925: Leroy
- 15 December 1925: Stirn
- 25 March 1927: Dewattre
- 1 September 1928: Fournier
- 25 April 1930: Cousse
- 25 April 1932: Aymes
- 25 April 1934: Troublé (René Jules)
- 25 April 1936: Bornecque
- 10 July 1938: Meyer

=== Second World War ===
- 13 January 1940 to 29 June 1940: Veyrier Du Muraud (Pierre)
- 7 September 1940: Schneider
- 1 March 1942 to 30 November 1942: Dumas
- 30 September 1944: Lajouanie (Marcel)

=== Since 1945 ===
- 7 January 1946: Paquette (Jean)
- 16 January 1947 to 31 March 1947: Letang (Michel)
- 1 January 1949 to 31 January 1949: Masson (Henry)

43rd Half-brigade

- 1 August 1950: De Toustain du Manoir
- 21 April 1952: Katz

43rd Infantry Regiment (7 March 1954)

- September 1954: Noël (Charles)
- 10 September 1956: Pénichon (Paul)
- 1 November 1958 to 31 October 1959: Andres (Pierre)
- 1 March 1964: Loyer (André)
- Ducret Roger
- 1 July 1967: Delerm (Jean)
- 1 July 1969: Hautecœur (Jean-Pierre)
- 31 July 1971: Rouquette (Pierre)
- 31 July 1973: Philippe (Marcel)
- 31 July 1975: Moussu (Jean)
- 1 August 1977: O'Callaghan (Patrick)
- 1 August 1979: Poudevigne (Jacques)
- 1 August 1981: Simonet (Rémi)
- 1 August 1983: Bracoud (Maurice)
- 1 August 1985: Vautrin (Jacques)
- 1 August 1987: Gouffault (André-François)
- 1 August 1989: Barth (Lucien)
- 2 August 1991: Lavigne (Daniel)
- 1 September 1993: Dequen (René)
- 1 September 1995: Gabet (Bernard)
- 29 August 1997: Hubault (Jean-Armel)
- 31 August 1999: Amelineau (François)
- 31 August 2001: Paitier (Marc)
- 27 June 2003: Baulain (Philippe)
- 4 July 2005: Louze (Laurent)
- 4 July 2007: Hameury (François)
- 6 July 2009: Bialais (Philippe)

Disbanded on 31 December 2010

== Equipment ==
9 regimental colors out of which 1 "white" Colonel and 8 of Ordinance «, yellow, green, red and black by opposition, & white cross filled with golden Fleur-de-lis and a golden ship in the middle of each cross ».

=== Regimental Colors ===
Drapeaux d’Ordonnance & Colonel

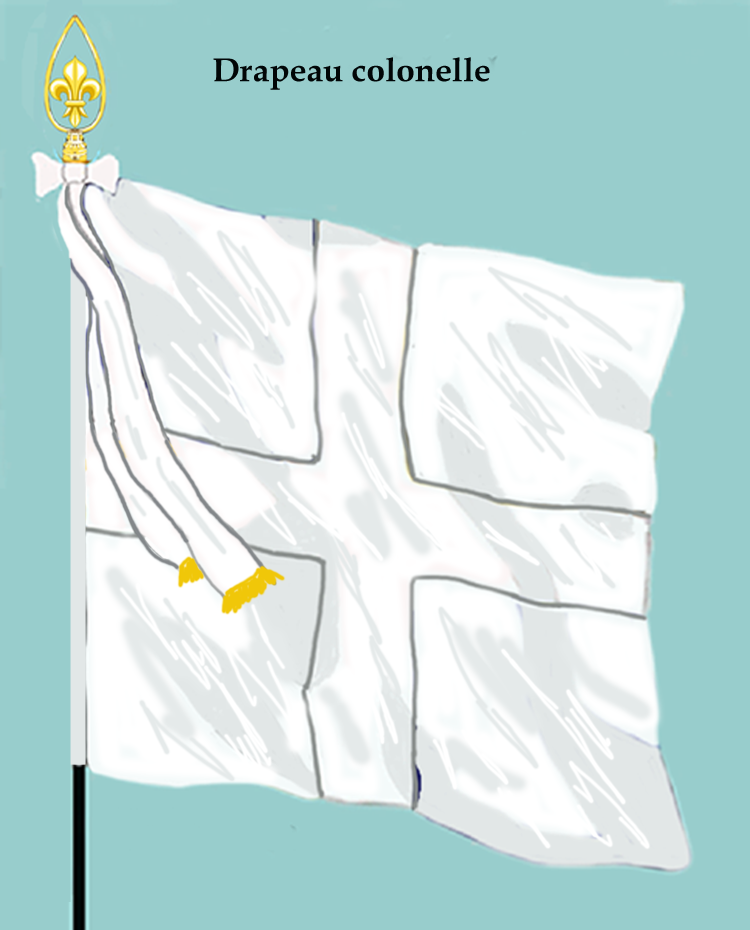
drapeau colonel

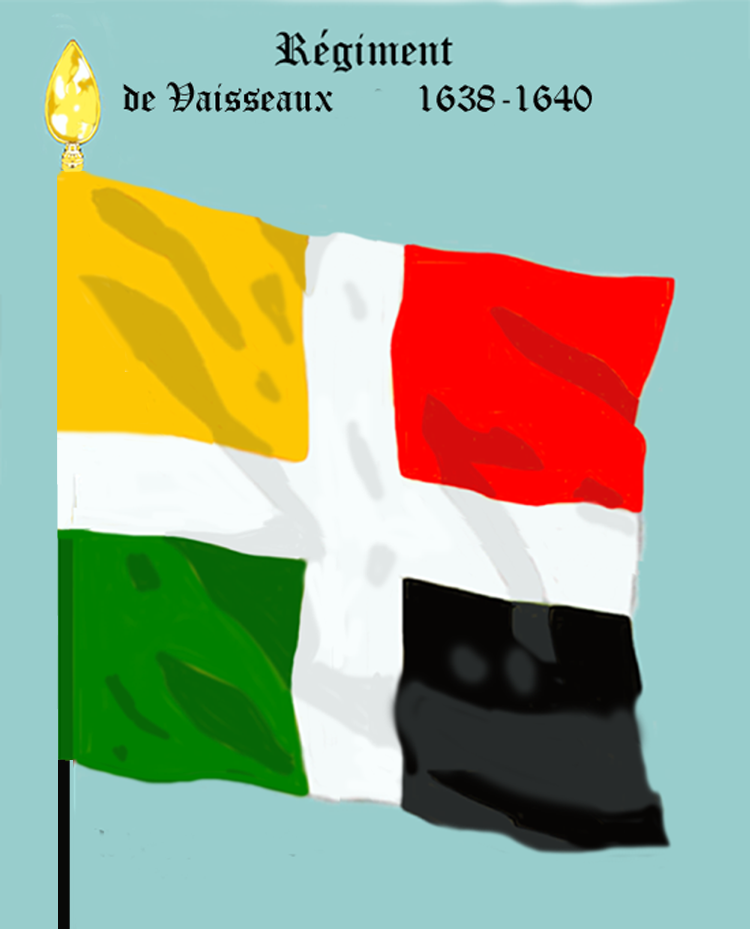
régiment des Vaisseaux de 1638 à 1640

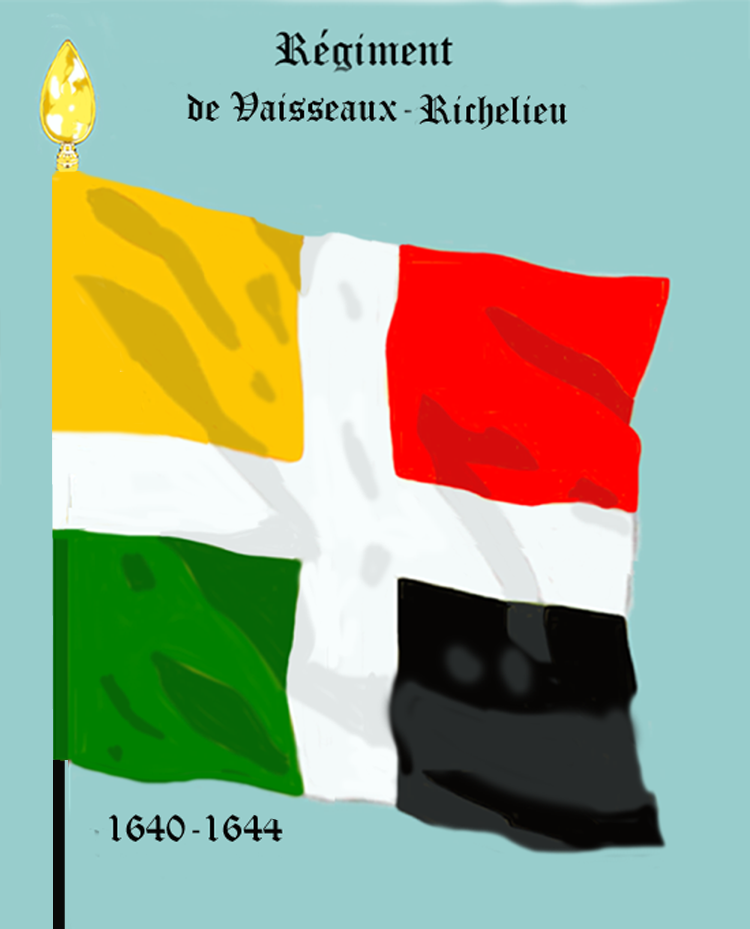
régiment des Vaisseaux-Richelieu de 1640 à 1644

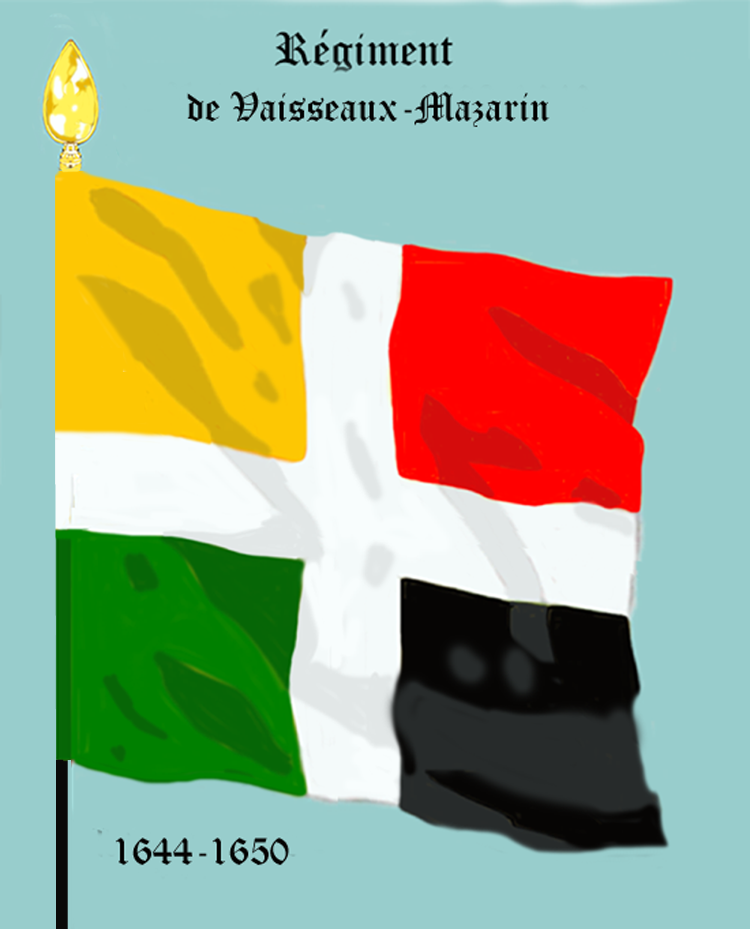
régiment des Vaisseaux-Mazarin de 1644 à 1650

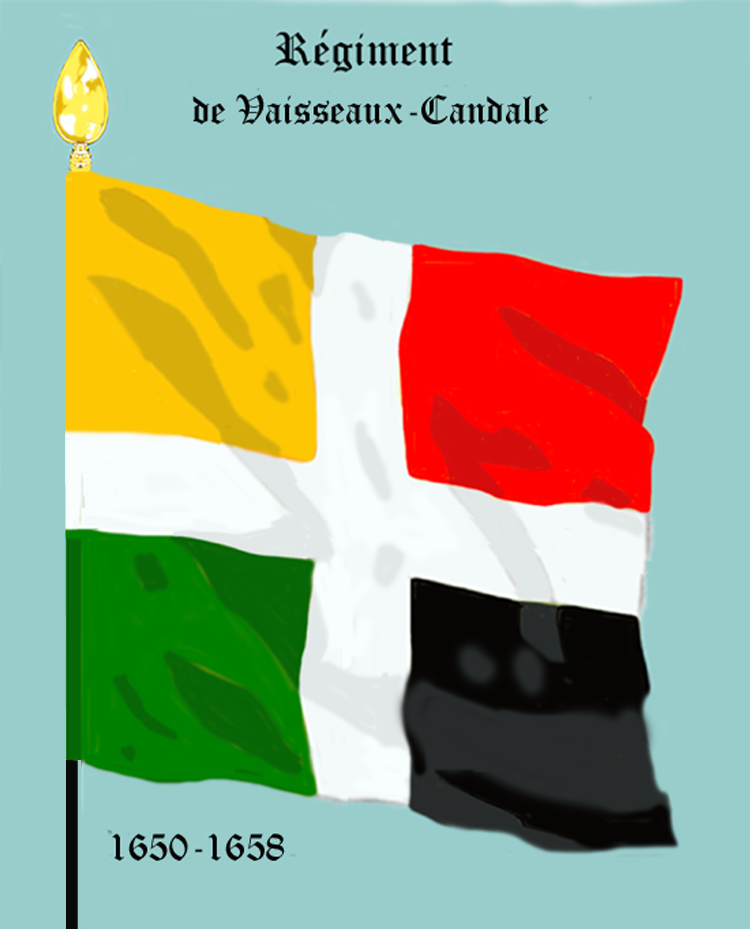
régiment des Vaisseaux-Candale de 1650 à 1658
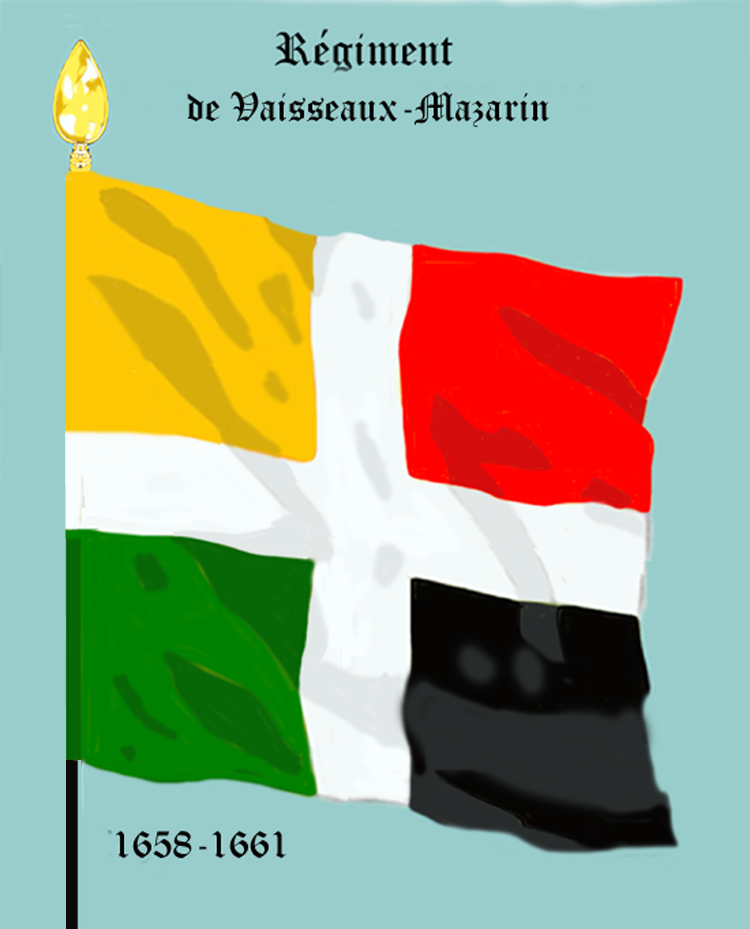
régiment des Vaisseaux-Mazarin de 1658 à 1661

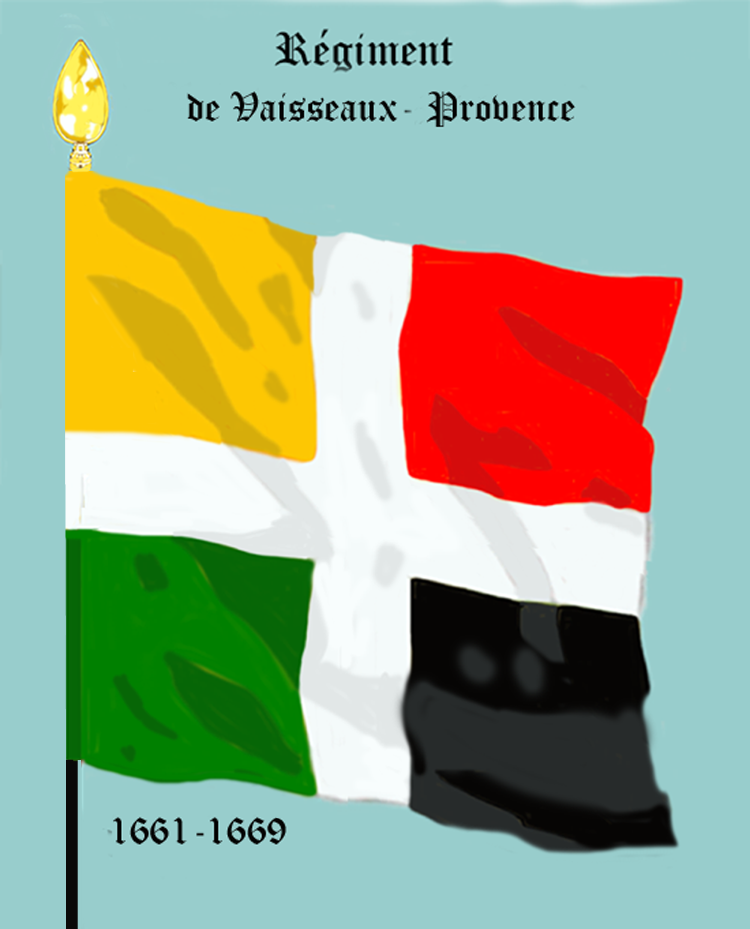
régiment des Vaisseaux-Provence de 1661 à 1669

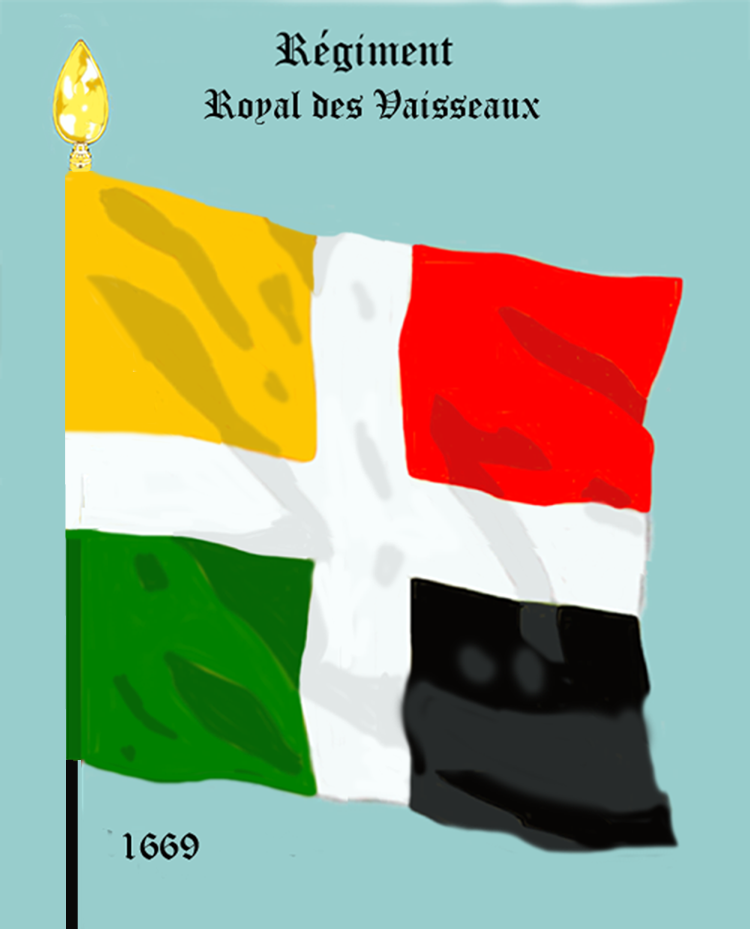
régiment Royal des Vaisseaux en 1669

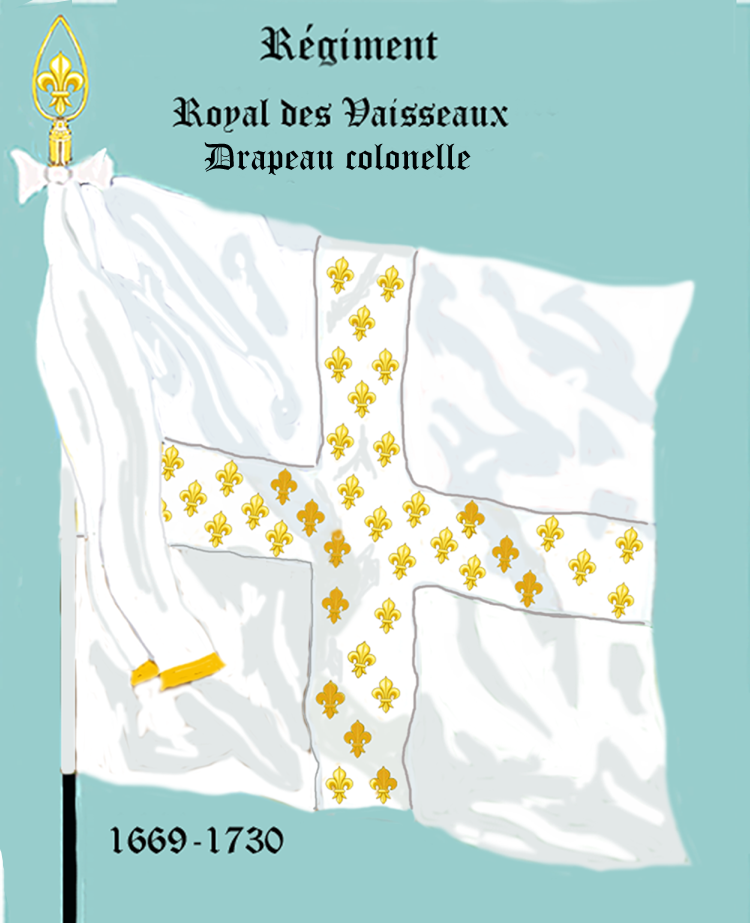
drapeau colonel

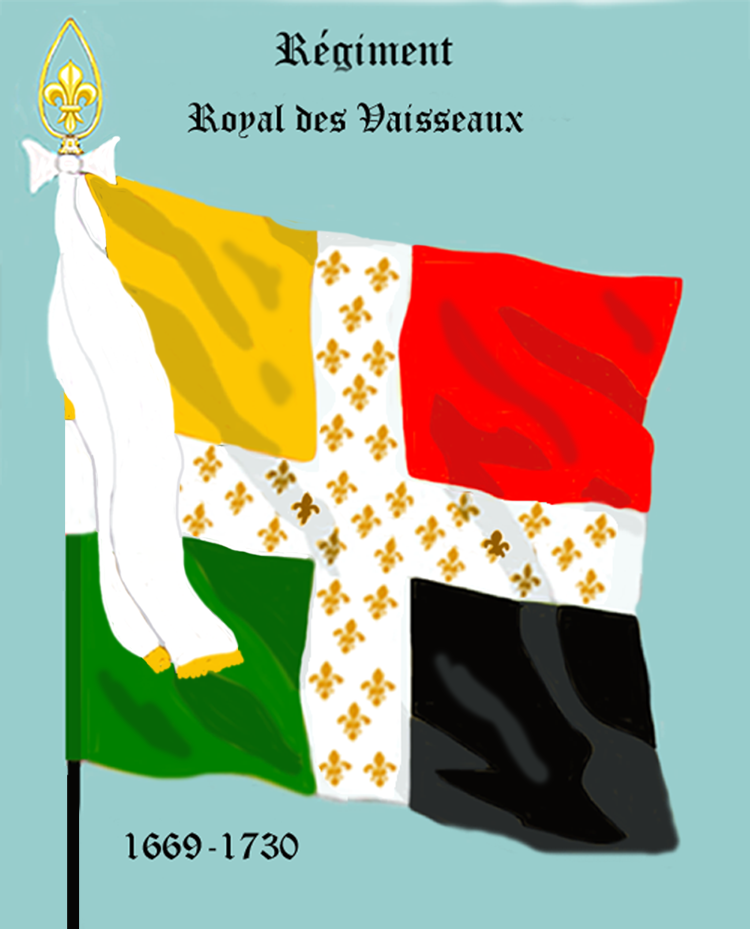
régiment Royal des Vaisseaux de 1669 à 1730

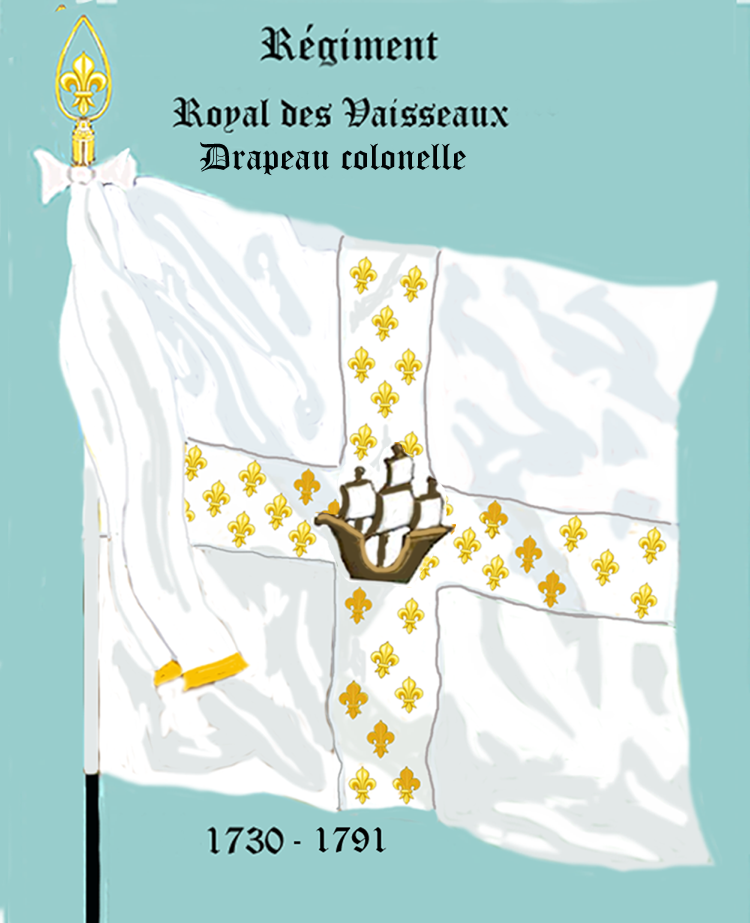
drapeau colonel

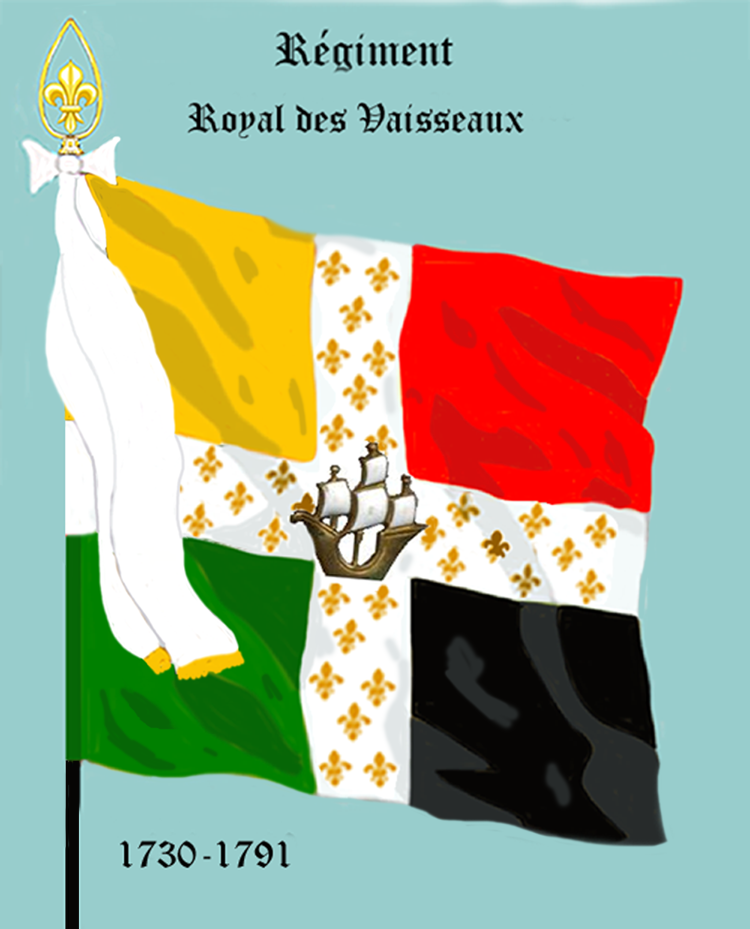
régiment Royal des Vaisseaux de 1730 à 1791

=== Uniform ===
Uniformes

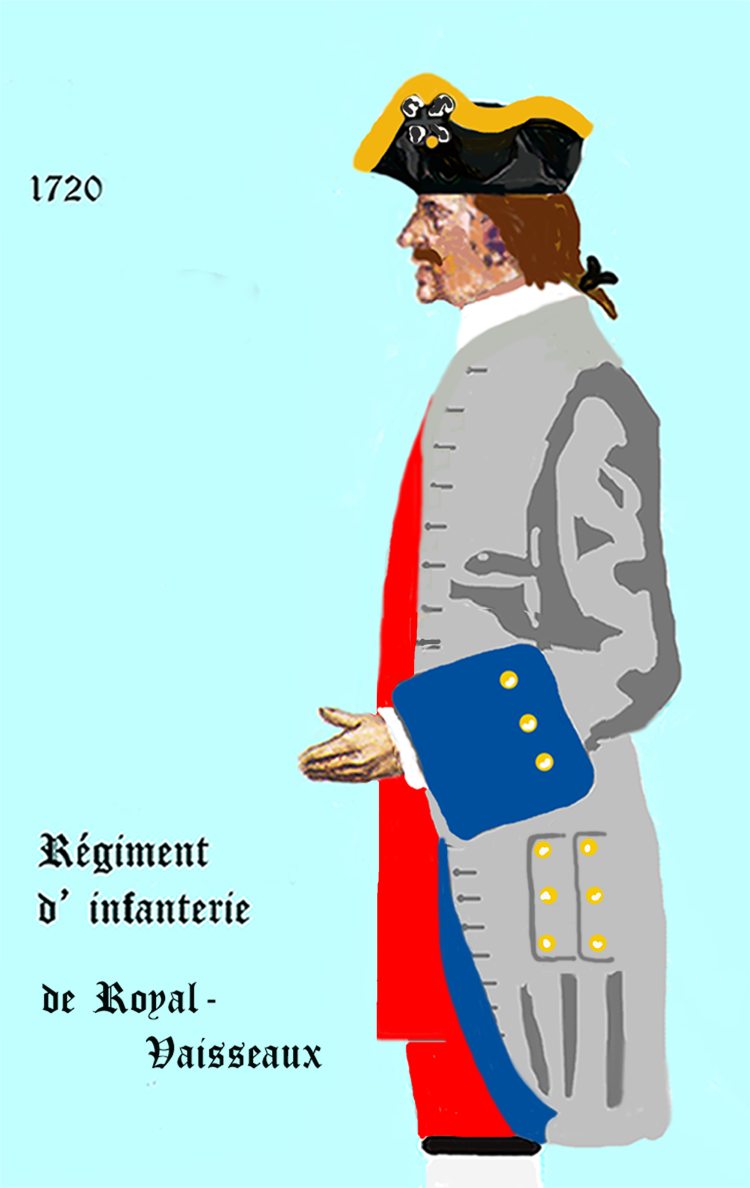
régiment Royal des Vaisseaux de 1720 à 1734

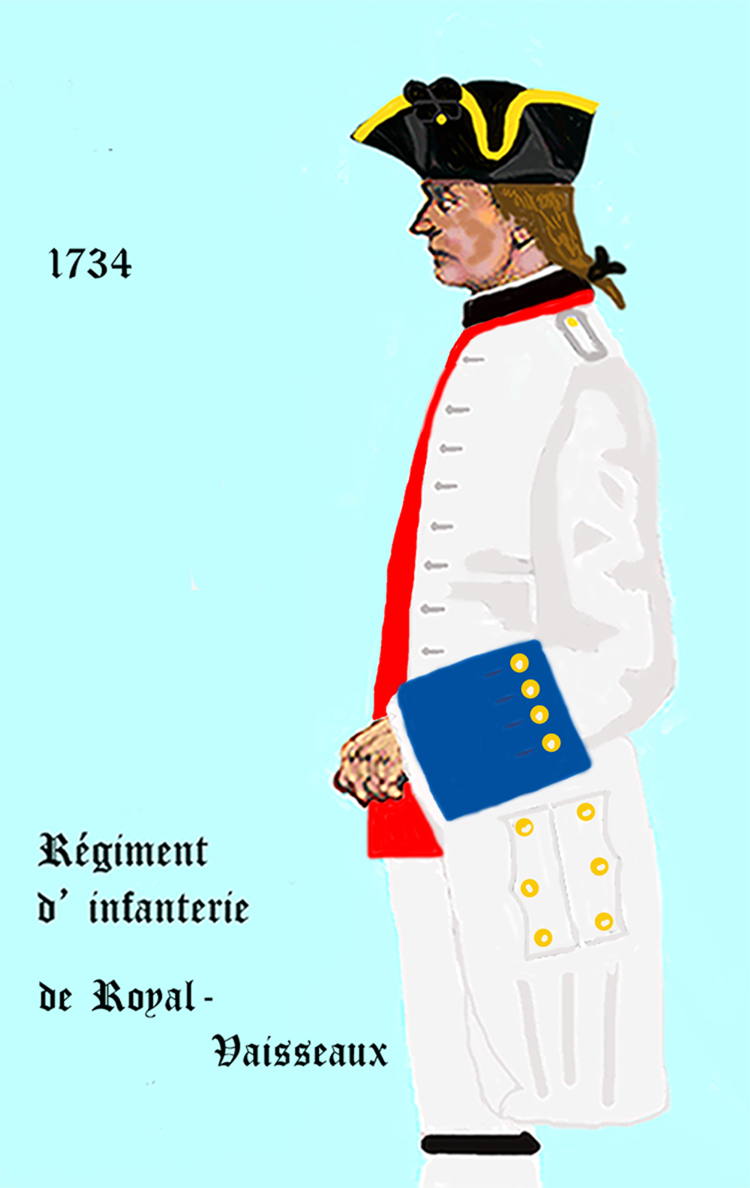
régiment Royal des Vaisseaux de 1734 à 1757

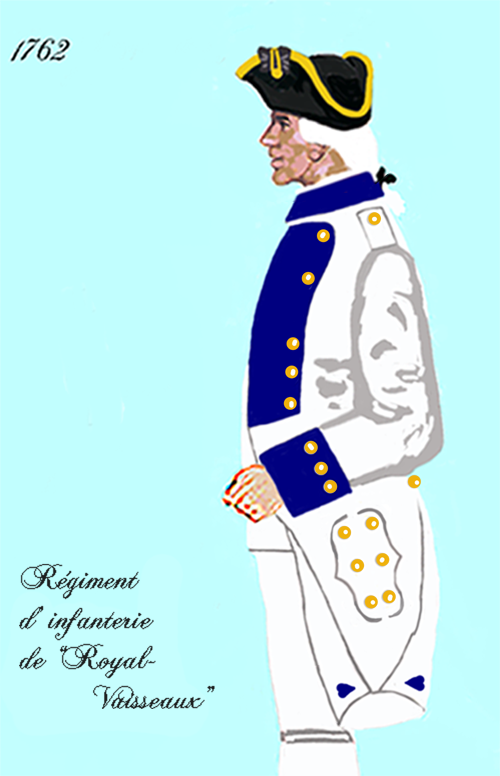
régiment Royal des Vaisseaux de 1762 à 1776

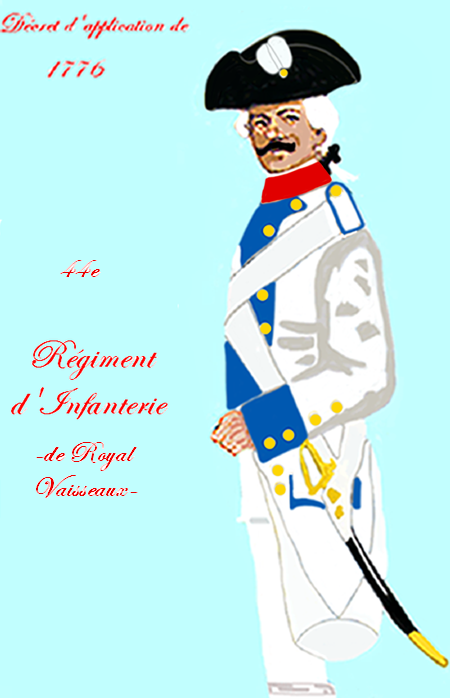
régiment Royal des Vaisseaux de 1776 à 1779
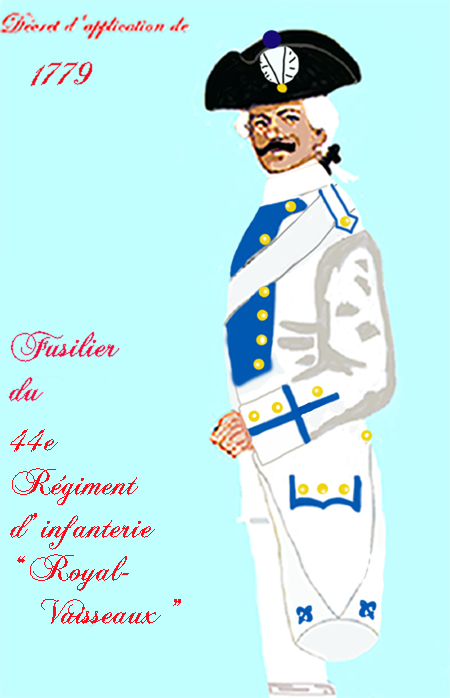
régiment Royal des Vaisseaux de 1779 à 1791

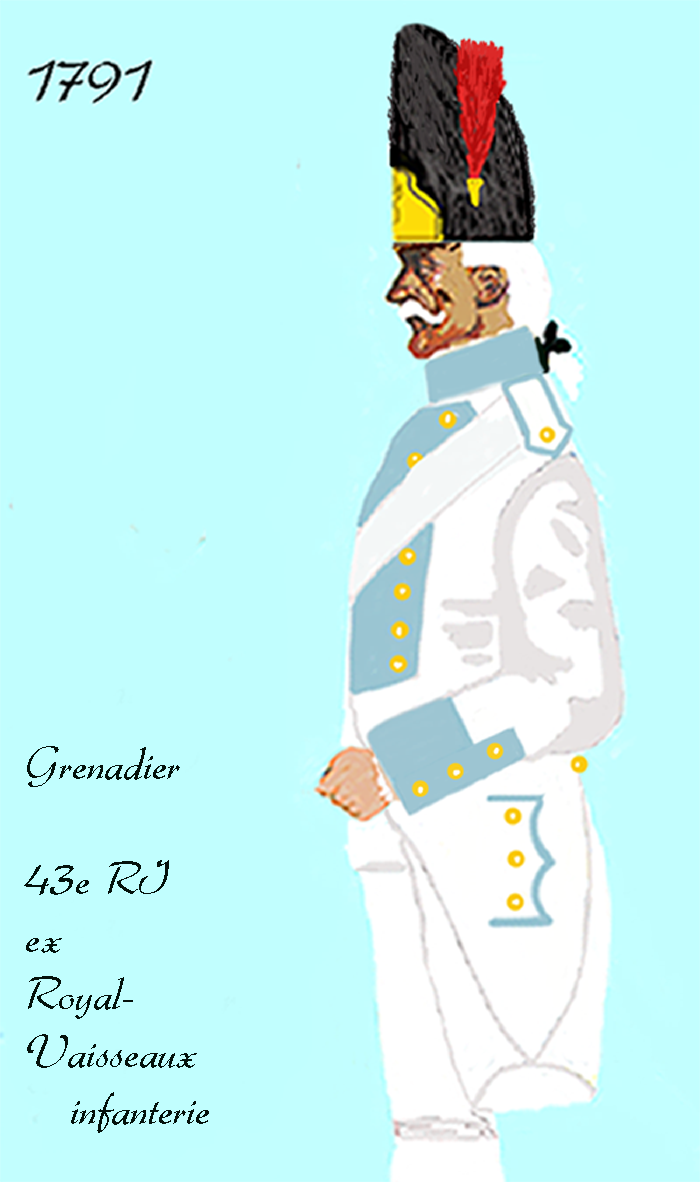
grenadier of the 43rd Line Infantry de 1791 à 1794

== Colonels and mestres de camp ==
- 13 March 1638: Henri d’Escoubleau de Sourdis, † 18 June 1645
- 3 February 1640: Armand-Jean du Plessis, Cardinal de Richelieu, † 4 December 1642
- 10 March 1644: Jules Cardinal Mazarin, † 9 March 1661
- 25 June 1650: Louis-Charles de Nogaret de Foix, Duke of Candale, † 1658
- 15 March 1661: Louis, Duke of Vendôme, Duke of Mercœur then Duke of Vendôme in 1665, became commander of the Armée de Provence on 8 April 1652 and commander of the Armée de Lombardie on 26 April 1656, † 6 August 1669
- 20 September 1667: Alexandre Le Bret
- 29 March 1679: Louis Potier de Gesvres, Marquis de Gandelus, born 19 November 1660, Brigadier on 27 August 1688, † 18 April 1689
- 24 April 1689: Louis, Count of Mailly, Brigadier on 25 April 1691, mestre de camp général of dragons on 29 April 1692, maréchal de camp on 30 March 1693, † 6 April 1699 (aged 37 years 5 months)
- 29 April 1692: René, Marquis de Névet
- 16 June 1699: Armée de Montvalat, Chevalier d’Entragues
- 1 March 1702: Isaac Charles de La Rochefoucaud, Count of Montendre, brigadier on 29 January 1702, † 15 August 1702
- 27 August 1702: Louis de Régnier, Marquis de Guerchy, baptized on 18 May 1663, Brigadier on 29 January 1702, Maréchal de camp on 26 October 1704, Lieutenant-général of the Armies of the King (French: lieutenant général des armées du roi) on 29 March 1710, † 13 February 1748
- 14 June 1705: Thomas Le Gendre de Collandre, Brigadier on 29 March 1710, Maréchal de camp on 1 February 1719, † 1 May 1738 (65 years of age)
- 6 March 1719: Pierre Aimé de Guiffrey, Chevalier then Count of Marcieu, Brigadier of infantry on 3 April 1721, Maréchal de camp on 1 August 1734, Lieutenant-general of the Armies of the King (French: lieutenant général des armées du roi) on 20 February 1743
- 25 November 1734: Claude Louis François de Régnier, Count of Guerchy, born 1 August 1715, Brigadier on 20 February 1743, Maréchal de camp on 1 June 1745, Lieutenant-general of the Armies of the King (French: lieutenant général des armées du roi) on 10 March 1748
- 26 May 1745: Jean-Baptiste Charles Hubert d’Esparbès de Lussan, Chevalier d’Aubeterre
- 21 February 1746: Louis Henri d’Esparbès de Lussan, Count of Aubeterre-La-Serre
- 7 August 1747: François Emery de Durfort, Count of Civrac, Brigadier on May 1758, declared maréchal de camp on November 1761 while brevetted on 20 February
- 30 November 1761: Anne Pierre, Marquis de Montesquiou, born 17 October 1739, † 30 December 1798
- 28 July 1773: Charles Pierre Hyacinthe, Count of Ossun
- 10 March 1788: Frédéric Séraphin de La Tour du Pin-Paulin, Marquis de Gouvernet
- 21 October 1791: Joseph Marie Rogon de Kerkaradec
- 16 May 1792: Anselme de Sicard
- 4 September 1792: François Vergès

== History of Garrisons, Fights, and Battles ==
=== Ancien Régime ===
- 1638: baptism of fire on 22 August during the naval battle of Gattari, then during the siege of the battle of Fontarrabie (French: Bataille de Fontarrabie).
- 8 June 1640 : naval combat against the fleet of Philip IV of Spain.
- 1641 : apprehension of Elne
- 1701 : War of the Spanish Succession (French: Guerre de Succession d'Espagne) : campaign in Italy : Battle of Chiari (French: Bataille de Chiari), Battle of Cremona (1702) (French: Bataille de Crémone (1702))
- 1702:
  - Battle of Cremona
- 1710 to 1712 : War of the Spanish Succession in Flanders : Battle of Denain (French: bataille de Denain), siege of Le Quesnoy
- 1713 : War of the Spanish Succession in Germany : battle of Landau in der Pfalz

Royal des Vaisseaux Infantry Regiment

- 1740-1748: War of the Austrian Succession
  - 11 May 1745: Battle of Fontenoy where the regiment lost 32 officers

=== Wars of the Revolution and the Empire ===
- 1792: Battle of Valmy and the taking of Namur
- The 1st battalion participated in campaigns from 1792 to 1794 with the Army of the North (France) (French: armée du Nord), the 2nd battalion within the same years with the Army of the Ardennes (French: armée des Ardennes).
- 1795: Battle of Loano
- 1796: Battle of Würzburg
- 1797: Battle of Rivoli, Battle of La Favorita, and Valvassone
- 1800: Battle of Montebello, Battle of Marengo, and Battle of Pozzolo
- 1805:
  - 15–20 October: Battle of Ulm
  - 2 December: Battle of Austerlitz
- 1806: Campaign of Prussia and Poland
  - 14 October: Battle of Jena
- 1807:
  - 8 February: Battle of Eylau
  - 10 June: Battle of Heilsberg
- 1808:
  - 14 July: Battle of Medina del Rio Seco
  - Bilbao, and Durango
- 1809: Santeter and Ronda
- 1810: capture of Ronda, Pamplona, and Aspiro
- 1811: Defence of Ronda, Villa-Nova-del-Duque, and Osuna
- 1812: Olora
- 1813:
  - 2 May: Battle of Lützen
  - 20–21 May: Battle of Bautzen
  - 21 June: Battle of Vitoria
  - 30 August: Battle of Kulm
  - 7 October: Battle of the Bidassoa
  - 16–19 October: Battle of Leipzig
  - 30–31 October: Battle of Hanau
  - Saint-Barbe
  - 10 November: Battle of Nivelle
  - Bayonne
- 1814: Peninsular War
  - 27 February: Battle of Orthez
  - 10 April: Battle of Toulouse
- 1814: War of the Sixth Coalition
  - 10 February: Battle of Champaubert
  - 11 February: Battle of Montmirail
  - 14 February: Battle of Vauchamps
  - 9–10 March: Battle of Laon
  - 13 March: Battle of Reims
  - 25 March: Battle of Fère-Champenoise
  - 30–31 March: Battle of Paris
- 1815: The Hundred Days
  - Saint-Gilles
  - Matha

=== The Restoration, July Monarchy, Second Empire, Third Republic until the First World War ===
- Revolution of 1830: the regiment, stationed at Le Havre and Dieppe rallied to the new régime.
- February 1831: participated in the suppression of disturbances in Morbihan.
- 1845-1851: French conquest of Algeria
  - 11 October 1845: the regiment is garrisoned at Toulon; three battalions were deployed to Algiers (two on 31 October and one on 3 November). The regiment established itself in Béjaïa.
  - 9 December 1845 – 4 January 1846: an expedition against the tribes linked to Abdel Kader: this expedition was badly prepared and resulted in the deaths of 66 men, 2 in combat.
  - 14 February 1846: 1st battalion is garrisoned at Philippeville, 2nd battalion is at Sétif. Operations in the region against the tribes in Boutaleb.
  - 12 June 1846: the 1st battalion leaves for Djidjelli, the 2nd is in operation against the Amouchas.
  - 30 April 1847: the 3rd battalion is in operation in Kabylie and subduing the Beni Brahim. The regiment then leaves for Batna then Bône, their new garrison post. Until March 1849, they worked on creating agricultural centres and in pacification.
  - October-26 November 1849: the Siege and capture of the oasis of Zaatcha. The operation was conducted with the 1st battalion of the Foreign Legion and the 4th company of the 3rd Battalion of the Bat' d'Af (BILA).
  - May–June 1850: An Infantry battalion is formed and fight in the region of Tébessa against the Nementcha tribe.
- 6 January 1851: Embarkation on the Vauban, disembarking at Toulon and continued to Langres.
- September 1851: The regiment is stationed at Paris.
- 2 December 1851: The regiment takes part in police operations following the coup d'État.
- 24 September 1853: The regiment leaves for Mâcon (E-M, depot, 2nd battalion), Lons-le-Saulnier (3rd battalion), and Châlons (1st battalion).
- January 1854 - 17 June 1856: Crimean War (Sevastopol): the regiment lost 879 men out of 3,350 engaged which included 500 from disease.
- 1859: Italian Campaign (Magenta, Solférino): the regiment lost 8 officers and 145 NCOs and enlisted men.
- Successive Garrisons: Bourg-en-Bresse (30 August 1859), Lorient (28 September 1859), Lille (15 September 1861), Amiens, Péronne, Ham (1868)
- 1870: Franco-Prussian War:
  - 18 August: Battle of Gravelotte
  - fighting with the Army of the Loire and Nord (under the name 69th Provisional Infantry Regiment)
  - 23–24 December: Battle of Hallue
- 1871:
  - 3 January: Battle of Bapaume
  - 19 January: Battle of St. Quentin
  - 3 September: a new 43rd is created by amalgamating 4 battalions of 6 companies each: garrisoned at Lille
- 30 August 1881: the 4th battalion moves to Tunisia and disembarks at La Goulette on 13 September 1881.
- 14 September 1883 the regiment returns to France.
- Maintaining order in cities: Douai area (1878), Armentières (1880), Premesques (1889), Halluin (1890).
- 1 October 1887: The regiment provides its 1st battalion to the 147th Infantry Regiment as part of the reorganisation of the corps, which created infantry regiments of three battalions.

=== First World War ===
Assignments

- August 1914 to 26 October 1916: 1st Infantry Brigade of the 1st Infantry Division of the 1st Army Corps
- 27 October 1916 to November 1918: 162nd division of infantry.

Constitution in 1914: 3 battalions (72 officers, 164 NCOs, 3,174 men, 219 horses)

==== 1914 ====
- 10–28 August: Battle of the Frontiers near Charleroi:
  - Hastière
  - Anseremont (16 August)
  - Odinat
  - Saint-Gérard (21–23 August)
  - Marienbourg (25 August)
- then the retreat:
  - Le Hérie-la-Viéville (Battle of Guise) (28–29 August).
- First Battle of the Marne (5–13 September):
  - Seu
  - region of Esternay
  - Ornes
  - Reims-Saint-Brice-Courcelles
  - Courcy
  - Cholera Farm
  - Berry-au-Bac
  - Sapigneul
- First Battle of the Aisne (13–28 September):
  - Chavonnes,
  - Vailly,
  - Soupir-Montsapin.
- Rested at Courcelles-Sapicourt.
- 15 December: depart for Champagne.

==== 1915 ====
- Champagne:
  - Beauséjour Farm (16 –23 February)
  - Bois Oblique (13–14 March)
  - Bois de Pareid (5 April)
- Aisne (24 April-22 June):
  - Trésauvaux
  - Godat Farm
  - Cormicy
  - Bouffignereux (16 July-3 August)

Fighting in Aisne cost the regiment 23 officers and 511 men.

==== 1916 ====
- Aisne (January–February):
  - La Neuville
  - Sapigneul (gas attack on 6 February)
- Battle of Verdun (27 February-5 April):
  - Côte du Poivre
  - Ravin de Bras-sur-Meuse.
- Aisne (6 April-10 August):
  - Craonnelle,
  - Blanc Sablon.
- Battle of the Somme (August–September):
  - Maurepas
  - Maricourt
  - Priez Farm (in September)
- Champagne (1 October-20 December):
  - Butte de Souain.

==== 1917 ====
- Aisne (7 January–March):
  - Le Blanc Sablon.
- Second Battle of the Aisne (offensive on 16 April):
- Plateau of Vauclerc.
- Flanders (5 July-19 November):
  - Passeur House.
  - Battle of Passchendaele (4 August): Chaudière sector (27 September-19 November).

==== 1918 ====
- Third Battle of the Aisne
  - 10 January - March: La Ville-aux-Bois, Juvincourt
  - April - May: Ferrières, Pérennes, Abbémont
  - 3 June - 27 July: Third Battle of the Aisne, Soissons sector
  - August: Nouvron-Vingré, Fontenoy, Tour-Vingré Farm
  - 21–28 September: Château of Vaucelles, Gerbau Farm
- Vosges Sector (29 September):
  - the regiment is stationed at Fresse and Le Thillot until 11 November 1918.
- The First World War cost the regiment 85 officers, 243 NCOs, and 2,790 men.
- In January 1919 the regiment guarded the Rhine at Mainz.

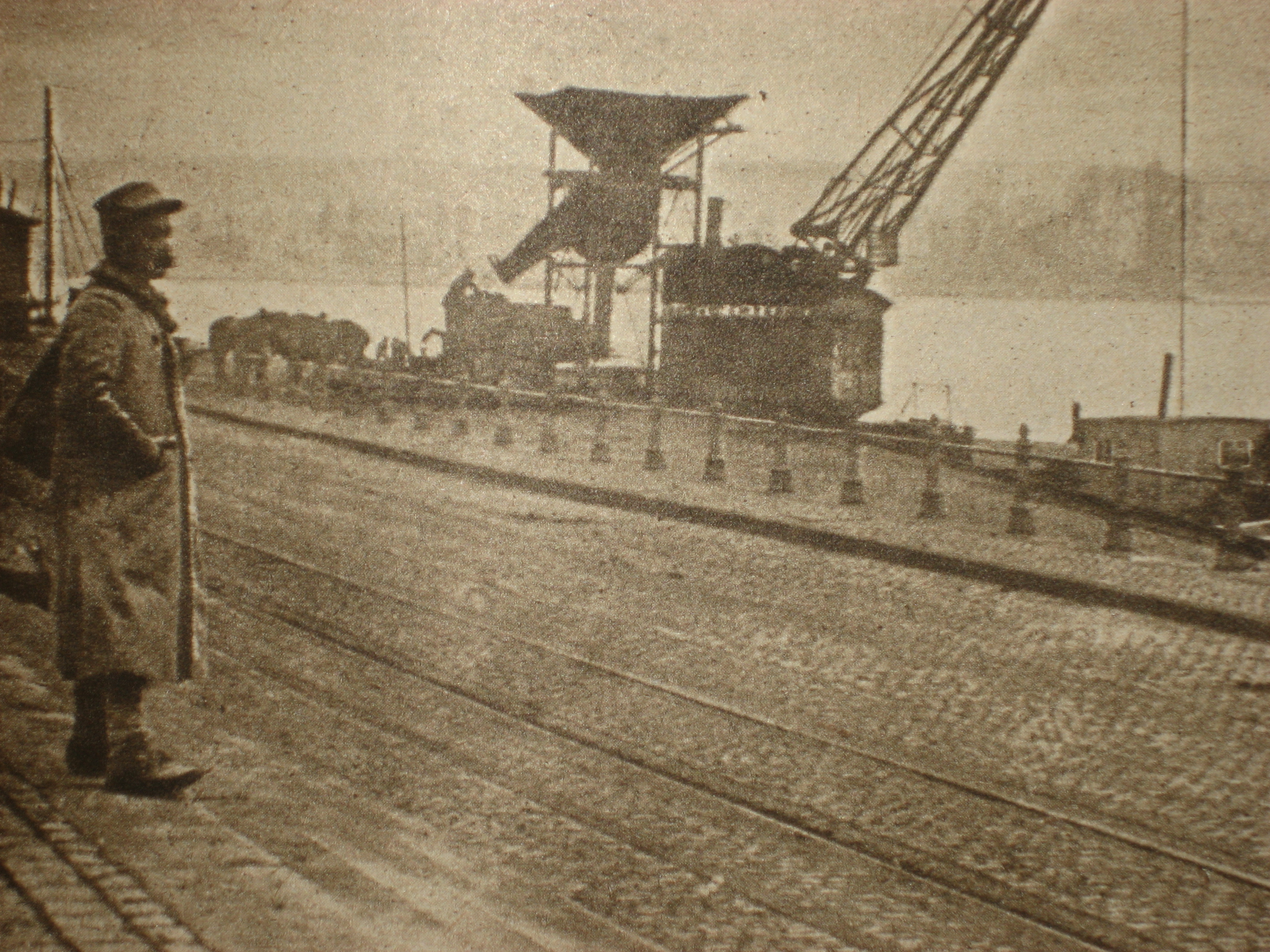
French soldier on the Rhine at Mainz.

=== Between the Wars ===
There is no information in the book The 43rd R.I. the regiment of Lille

=== Second World War ===
- In 1939–1940, constantly bombarded by enemy aircraft, the regiment moved to contact the German army in Belgium (fighting on the Dijle) leading to fierce fighting along the Scheldt (Bruille-Saint-Amand). The regiment then regrouped and fought at Dunkirk before being ordered to disarm in Normandy after losing 231 killed and 600 wounded.
- Shortage of time nearly led to the loss of the regimental flag. On 21 June 1940 Colonel Gaillard decided, in the face of the German danger, to hide his flag in the basement of Le Mesnil-Rainfray rectory. The flag was returned at the end of the winter of 1941 by Lieutenant Mourgant and Sergeant Menet on the instructions of Lieutenant Vallat, formerly of the 43rd Infantry Regiment. The unit became the 43rd Alpine Infantry Regiment stationed in Marseille and Digne (one battalion). The regiment recovered the flag which was solemnly presented on 3 May 1941 before the unit was disbanded in 1942 after the invasion of Vichy France by the Germans. It was restored by the Maquis of Nord and Cher and ended the war on the front in the pockets of the Atlantic.
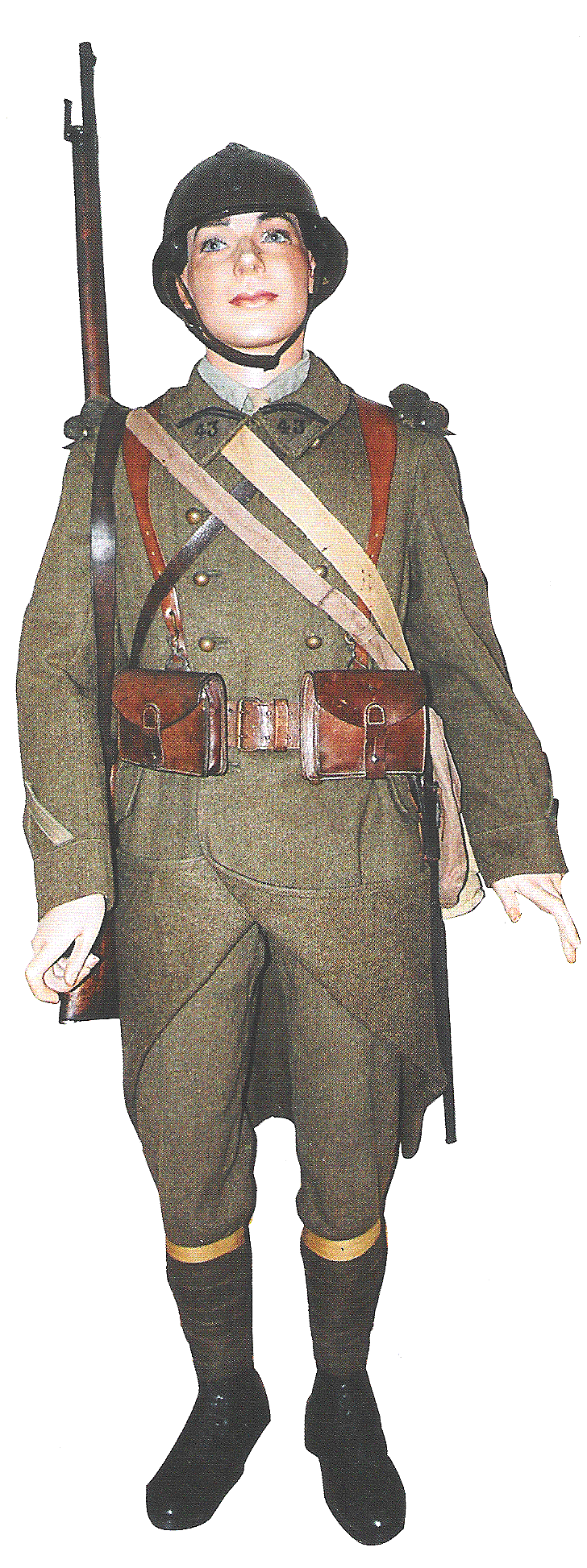
French Army uniform of an infantryman of the 43rd Infantry Regiment in 1940 at the Dunkirk Museum dedicated to Operation Dynamo and defence

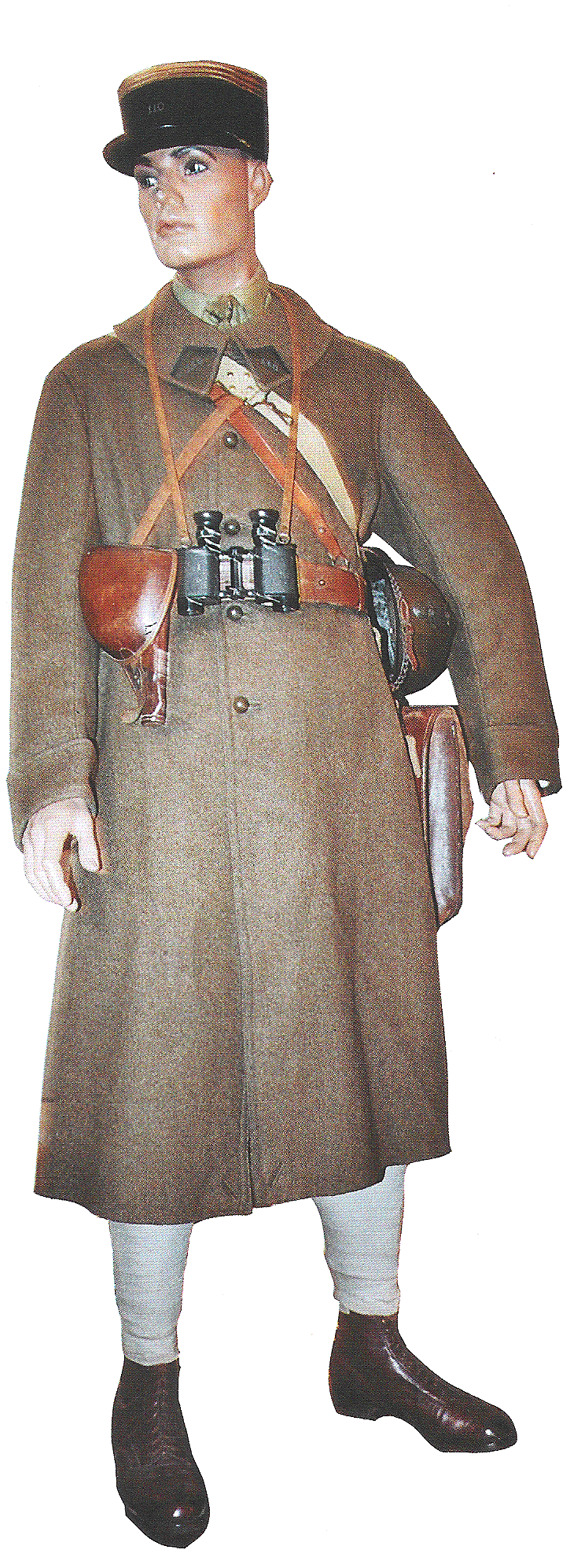
Uniform of a French army officer of the 43rd Infantry Regiment in 1940 at the Dunkirk Museum dedicated to Operation Dynamo and defence

=== 1945 to today ===
==== Indochina War ====
The regiment detached the March battalion of the 43rd Infantry Regiment between January 1947 and June 1948 and participated in particular in Operation Léa.

A citation for the March battalion of the 43rd Infantry regiment:

"An elite Regiment, a worthy heir of the Royal des Vaisseaux, presented themselves on their arrival in Indochina, faithful to the finest traditions of their forebears. Engaged for eight months in the sub-sector of Gia Lâm (Tonkin) they have carried out, under the fiery leadership of their chief - Commandant Lejosne, the conquest and pacification of a difficult area between the Canal des Rapides and the Red River. Called on to participate in the liberation of Hà Đông during the freeing of Nam Định, their cleaning-up operation north of the Rapids bridge won admiration for their energy, their offensive spirit which never shrank from the hardest sacrifices.

On 14 May 1947, after a daring raid on the Red River, they seized Việt Trì. Engaged without a moment's rest in the autumn campaign, they once again demonstrated their bite. Placed in difficult conditions on the Claire River at Phu Doan, Lang-Quang, Tuyên Quang, and Sơn Dương, they coped magnificently. They inflicted heavy losses in men and material on the enemy. They are assuredly one of our best Units".

==== Algerian War ====
The regiment participated in operations in Morocco and in Algeria from 1952 to 1962 at the cost of 2 officers, 3 NCOs, and 57 men killed.

=== Reorganisation ===
On 1 July 2005 the regiment was reorganised to create the 6th RCS of Douai which had: 21 officers, 106 NCOs and 227 voluntary enlisted men divided into two active units: 1 Command & Support (CAS) and 1 CDC.

==== Mission ====
The 43rd Infantry Regiment, deployable to any of the forces is subject to the Commandement des Forces Terrestres. Its mission is to ensure the support of various Headquarters in the Lille garrison. It contributes, in compliance with NATO criteria to support the deployment of the Headquarters Rapid Reaction Corps – France (RRC-fr) during its operational preparations and during engagements.

==== Composition ====
1 company for command and logistics (CCL) 1 company for administration and support (CAS) 1 company for Reserve (5CIR)

==== Materials ====
The main materials are interconnected modules that allow rapid provision of mobile headquarters command posts with transport vehicles with trailers to provide movement (a semi-trailer is 38 tons).

==== Dissolution ====
The reserve unit: 5th USR company delivered its flag in December 2010.

- Its flag had the name "AFN 1952-1962" inscribed on it.
- On 31 December 2010 the 43rd Infantry Regiment was dissolved
- On 1 January 2011: It became the GSBdD (Group for Support of the Defence Base) of Lille, a joint agency of the EMA with a mission to provide general administrative and common support tasks for the benefit of all formations of the Ministry of Defence and Veterans Affairs based in Nord and Pas de Calais. The GSBdD was entrusted with the custody of the Flag and Hall of Honour for the 43rd Infantry Regiment.

== Flag ==
It has sewn in gold letters in its centre strip, the entries shown in the picture below:

== Decorations ==
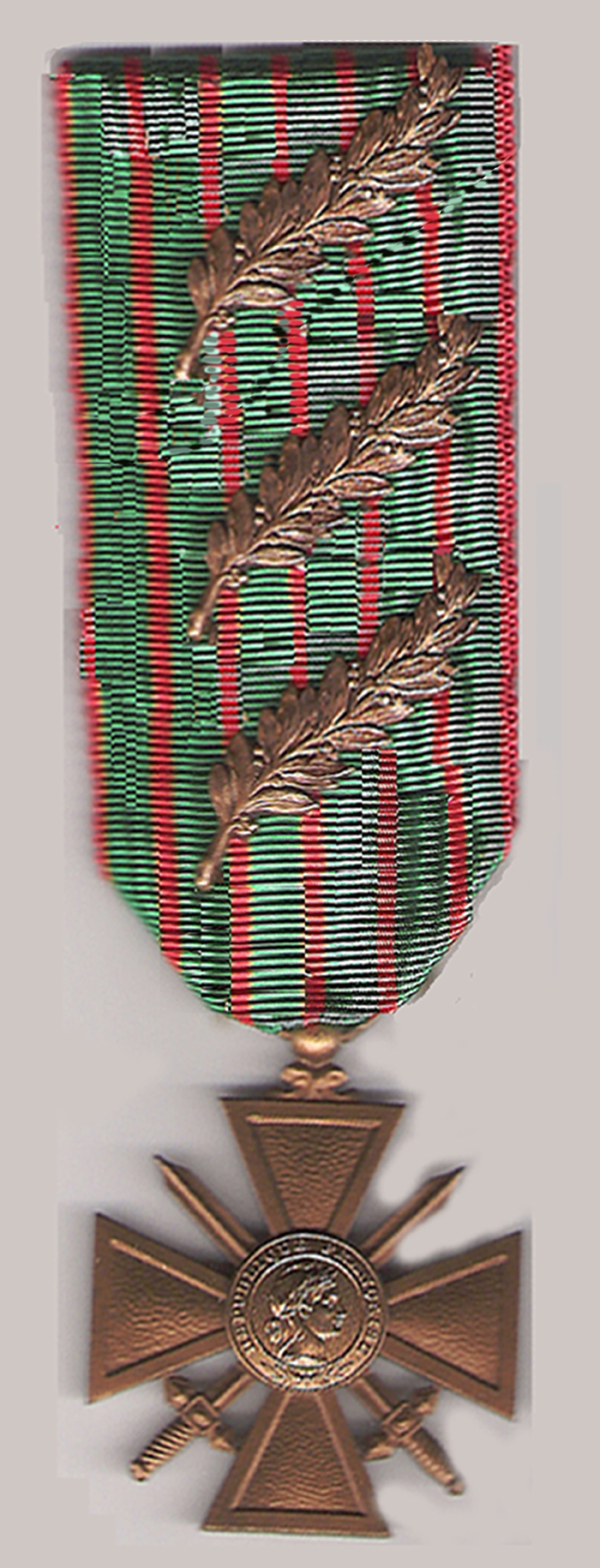
Fourragère in the colours of a ribbon of the Croix de guerre 1914–1918

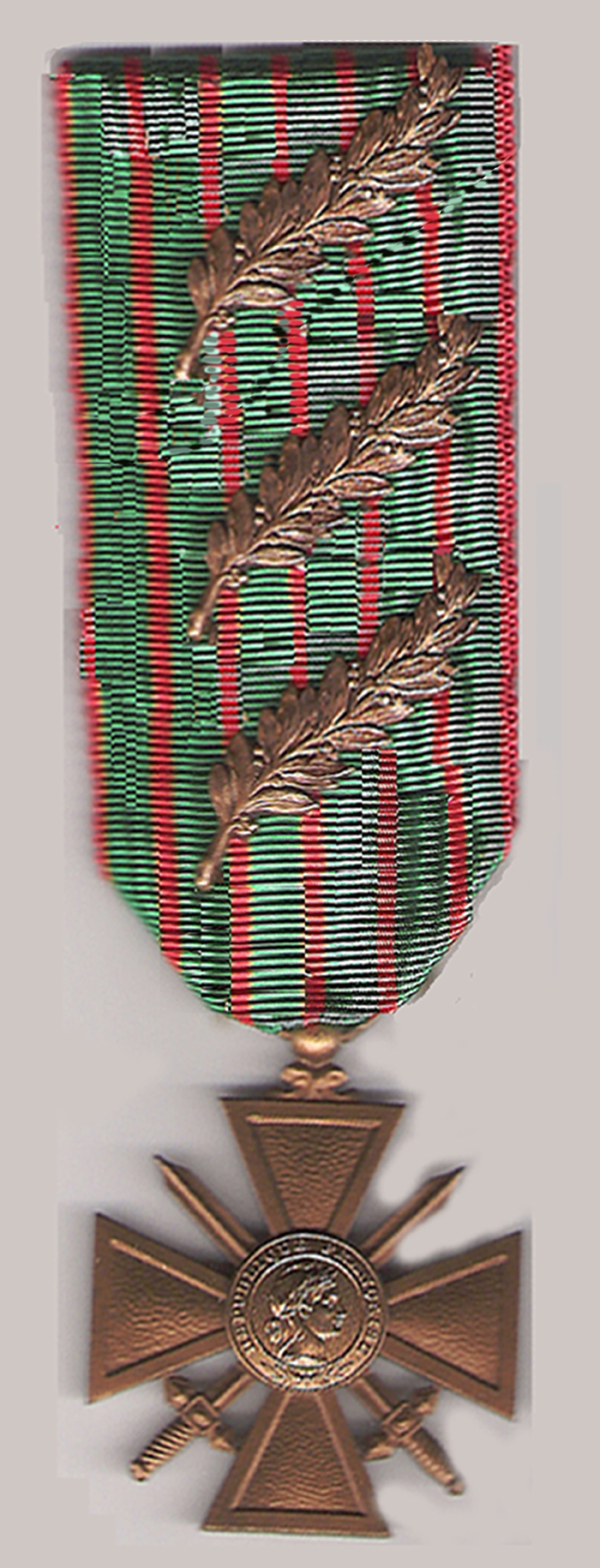
The tie is decorated with the Croix de guerre 1914–1918 with 3 citations (30 October 1916, 5 October 1917, and 29 September 1918) at the order of the army (three palms). The 43rd Infantry Regiment also holds the Gold Medal of the City of Milan following its participation in the battles of Solferino and Palestro in 1859.

The regiment detached a Marching battalion in Indochina between January 1947 and June 1948. Its pennant bears the Croix de guerre des Théâtres d'opérations extérieurs with a citation (9 June 1948) at the order of the army (one palm).

- They wear a fourragère in the colours of the Croix de guerre 1914–1918.
- The Blue Star of the Regiment is worn on the focused on the fourragère.

== Regimental Insignia ==
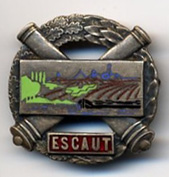
Insignia of the fortified sector of l’Escaut - 1940 (1st model)

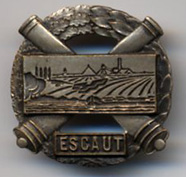
Insignia of the fortified sector of l’Escaut - 1940 (2nd model)

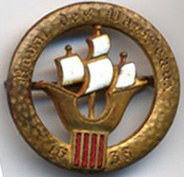
Insignia of the 43rd Alpine Infantry Regiment (1940–1942)

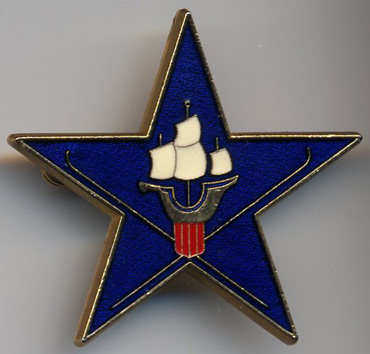
Insignia of the SES of the 43rd Alpine Infantry Regiment (1940–1942)

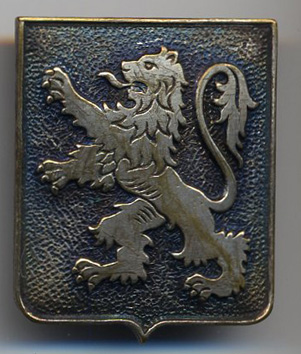
Beret Insignia of the 43rd Alpine Infantry Regiment (1940–1942)

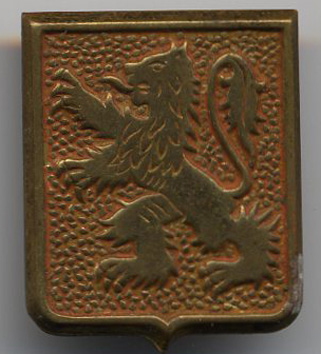
Beret Insignia de béret or fourragère of the 43rd Alpine Infantry Regiment (1940–1942)

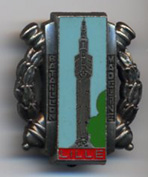
Insignia of the Madeline battalion (1945)

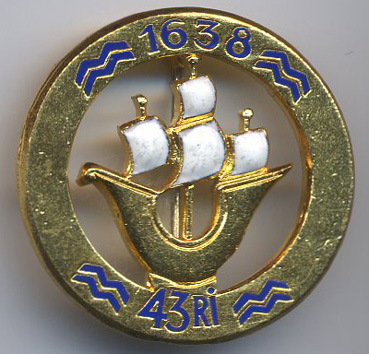
Insignia of the 43rd Infantry Regiment (blue waves and characters)

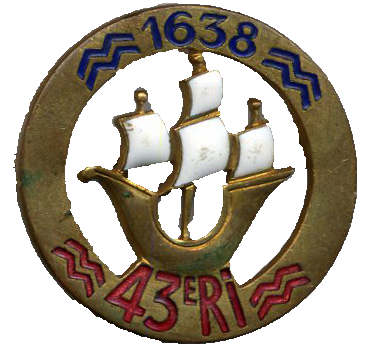
Insignia of the 43rd Infantry Regiment (blue waves and characters on top, red below)

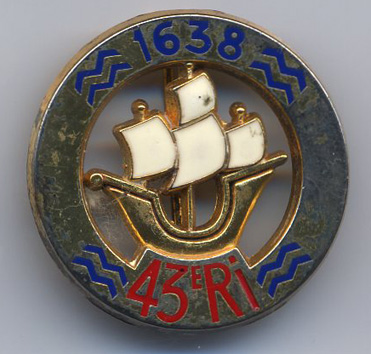
Insignia of the 43rd Infantry Regiment (blue waves and characters on top, blue waves and red characters below)

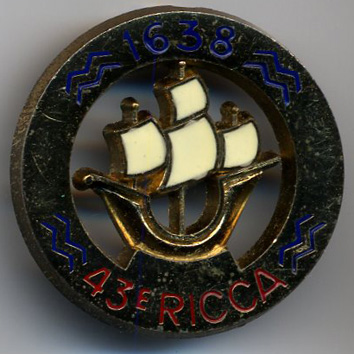
Insignia of the 43rd Infantry Regiment CCA (1984/1991)

== Company Insignia ==
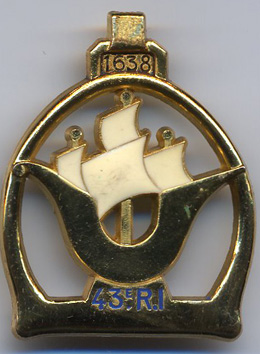
Insignia of the Support Company, 43rd Infantry Regiment (Morocco 1956)

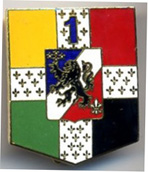
Insignia of the 1st company of the 43rd Infantry Regiment (around 1990)

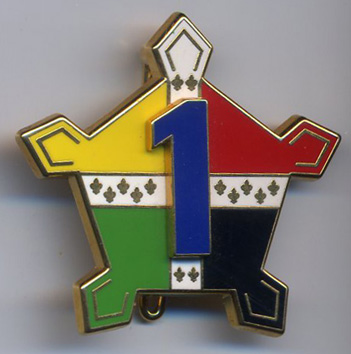
Insignia of the 1st company of the 43rd Infantry Regiment (around 2004)

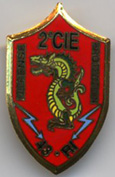
Insignia of the 2nd company of the 43rd Infantry Regiment (around 1990)

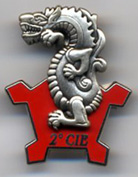
Insignia of the 2nd company of the 43rd Infantry Regiment (around 2004)

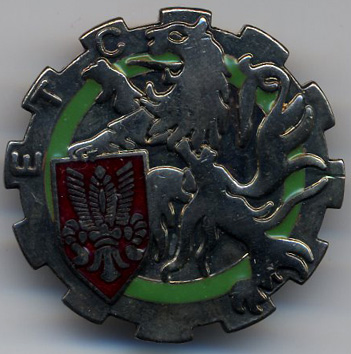
Insignia of the training squadron of the 43rd Infantry Regiment (around 1990)

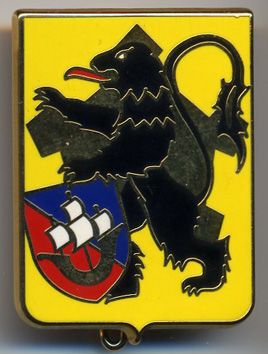
Insignia of the 3rd company of the 43rd Infantry Regiment (around 1990)

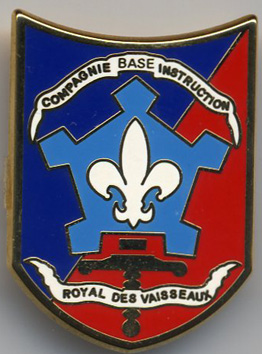
Insignia of the base and training company of the 43rd Infantry Regiment (around 1990?)

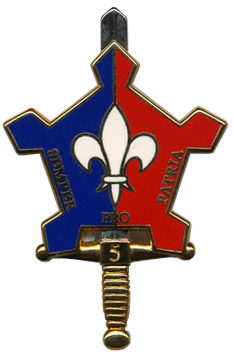
Insignia of the 5th company of the 43rd Infantry Regiment (today)

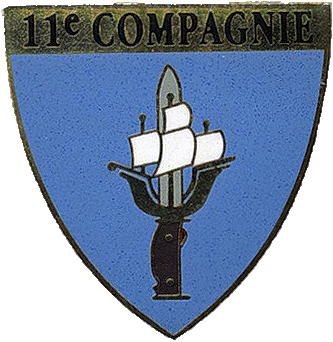
Insignia of the 11th company of the 43rd Infantry Regiment (around 1990)

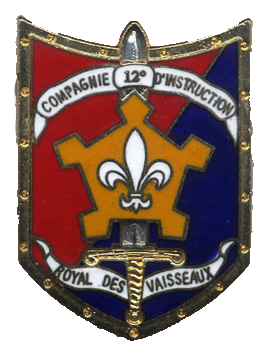
Insignia of the 12th company of the 43rd Infantry Regiment (around 1990)

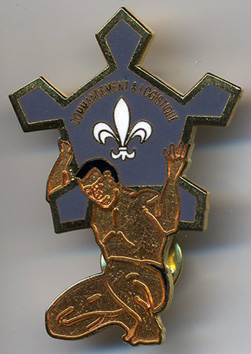
Insignia of the Command and Logistics Company of the 43rd Infantry Regiment

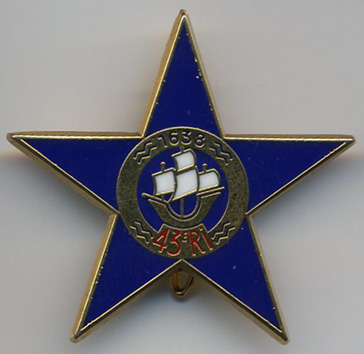
Star of the 43rd Infantry Regiment (today)

== Famous people who served in the 43rd Infantry Regiment ==
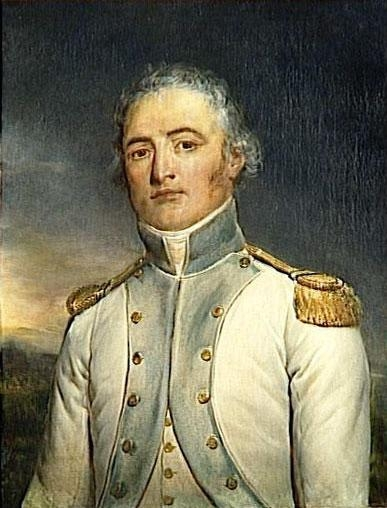
General Bertrand Clauzel (1772–1842), Count of Empire, while Captain Clauzel of the 43rd Infantry of the Line in 1792 (Georges Rouget).

- 1780: Louis-Joseph Nompar de Caumont (1768–1838), lieutenant in the Royal-Vaisseaux in 1780, Field Marshal (1814), son of Charles Pierre Hyacinthe, Count of Ossun, commanding officer.
- 1792: Marshal Bertrand Clauzel as chief captain.
- 1797: Major-General Jean-Baptiste Broussier as brigade commander.
- 1909: Paul Maistre, General of Division.
- 1982: Daniel Pihen

== See also ==
- Troupes de la marine

== Sources and bibliography ==
- The Royal des vaisseaux in the storm, Colonel Verrier of Mureau, 1954 (in French)
- 43rd, your badges to remember you?, brochure showing all the insignia of 43rd Infantry Regiment published in 2002. Study by Captain Levesque.
- The 43rd R.I. the regiment of Lille, a complete history of the regiment under the direction of Lieutenant Colonel Denis Chevignard, Edition La Voix du Nord, 2003 (in French)
- The Chapel of the Citadel of Lille, a brochure presenting the architecture and the historical context of the building. The 43rd Infantry Regiment is cited, published in 2005. Study by Chief Adjutant Blanchard.
- de Poli, Oscar (1885). Un Régiment d'autrefois, Royal-Vaisseaux (1638-1792) [A Regiment of Old, Royal-Vaisseaux (1638–1792)] (in French). Paris: Heraldic Council of France.
- Chronologie historique-militaire, par M. Pinard, tomes 1, 4, 5, 6, 7 et 8, Paris 1760, 1761, 1762, 1763, 1764 et 1768
