= Chasseguet =

Chasseguet may refer to:

- Gérard Chasseguet (1930–2025), French politician
- Janine Chasseguet-Smirgel (1928–2006), French psychoanalyst and author

== See also ==
- Chasseguey, a former commune in north-western France
