= Chérencé =

Chérencé may refer to the following communes in France:

- Chérence, in the Val-d'Oise department
- Chérencé-le-Héron, in the Manche department
- Chérencé-le-Roussel, in the Manche department

== See also ==
- Chérancé (disambiguation)
