= Juvigny les Vallées =

- Commune
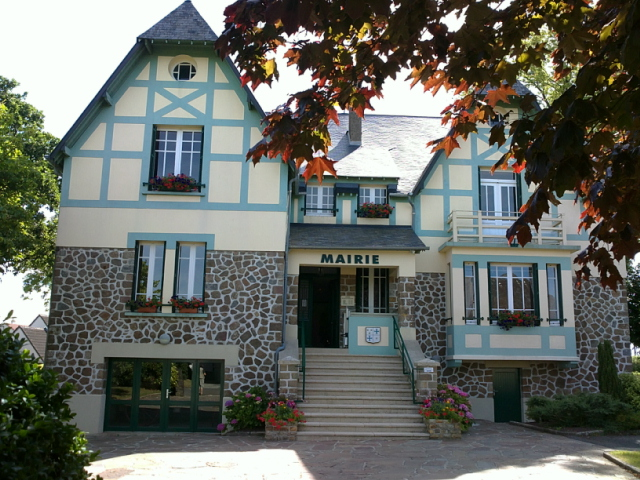
- The town hall in Juvigny
- Location of Juvigny les Vallées
- Location within France Location within Normandy
- Coordinates: 48°40′41″N 1°01′12″W
- Country: France
- Region: Normandy
- Department: Manche
- Arrondissement: Avranches
- Canton: Isigny-le-Buat
- Intercommunality: CA Mont-Saint-Michel-Normandie

Government
  - Mayor (2020–2026): Xavier Tassel
- Area^{1}: 57.25 km^{2} (22.10 sq mi)
- Population (2023): 1,674
  - Density: 29.24/km^{2} (75.73/sq mi)
- Time zone: UTC+01:00 (CET)
  - Summer (DST): UTC+02:00 (CEST)
- INSEE/Postal code: 50260 /50520
- ^{1} French Land Register data, which excludes lakes, ponds, glaciers > 1 km^{2} (0.386 sq mi or 247 acres) and river estuaries.

Juvigny les Vallées (French pronunciation: [ʒyviɲi le vale]) is a commune in the department of Manche, northwestern France. The municipality was established on 1 January 2017 by merger of the former communes of Juvigny-le-Tertre (the seat), La Bazoge, Bellefontaine, Chasseguey, Chérencé-le-Roussel, Le Mesnil-Rainfray and Le Mesnil-Tôve.

== See also ==
- Communes of the Manche department
