= Chérancé =

Chérancé is the name of the following communes in France:

- Chérancé, Mayenne, in the Mayenne department
- Chérancé, Sarthe, in the Sarthe department

== See also ==
- Chérencé (disambiguation)
