= Le Mesnil-Tôve =

- Part of Juvigny les Vallées
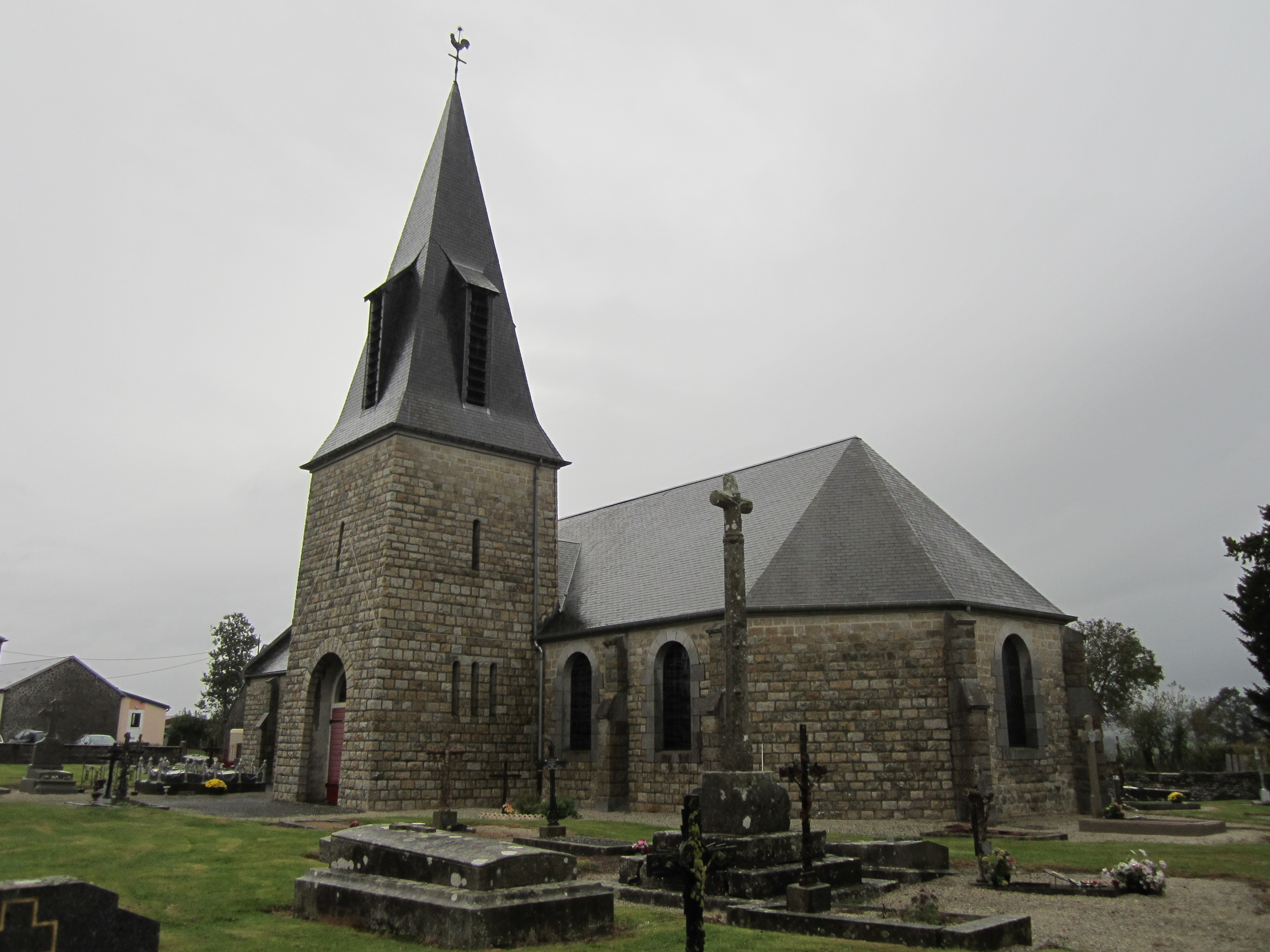
- The church of Saint-Jean-Baptiste
- Location of Le Mesnil-Tôve
- Location within France Location within Normandy
- Coordinates: 48°42′06″N 1°01′16″W
- Country: France
- Region: Normandy
- Department: Manche
- Arrondissement: Avranches
- Canton: Isigny-le-Buat
- Commune: Juvigny les Vallées
- Area^{1}: 11.74 km^{2} (4.53 sq mi)
- Elevation: 125 m (410 ft)
- Highest elevation: 291 m (955 ft)
- Lowest elevation: 60 m (200 ft)
- Population (2022): 228
  - Density: 19.4/km^{2} (50.3/sq mi)
- Time zone: UTC+01:00 (CET)
  - Summer (DST): UTC+02:00 (CEST)
- Postal code: 50520
- ^{1} French Land Register data, which excludes lakes, ponds, glaciers > 1 km^{2} (0.386 sq mi or 247 acres) and river estuaries.

Le Mesnil-Tôve (French pronunciation: [lə mɛnil tov]) is a former commune in the Manche department in Normandy in northwestern France. On 1 January 2017, it was merged into the new commune Juvigny les Vallées.

== See also ==
- Communes of the Manche department
