= Juvigny-le-Tertre =

- Part of Juvigny les Vallées
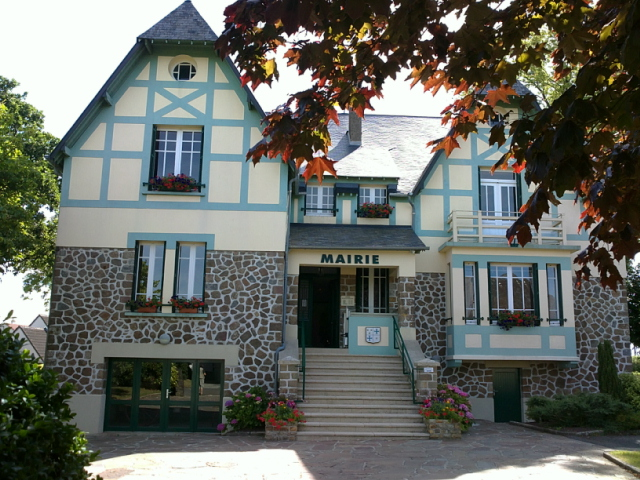
- Town hall
- Location of Juvigny-le-Tertre
- Location within France Location within Normandy
- Coordinates: 48°40′39″N 1°01′12″W
- Country: France
- Region: Normandy
- Department: Manche
- Arrondissement: Avranches
- Canton: Isigny-le-Buat
- Commune: Juvigny les Vallées
- Area^{1}: 7.50 km^{2} (2.90 sq mi)
- Highest elevation: 283 m (928 ft)
- Lowest elevation: 135 m (443 ft)
- Population (2022): 605
  - Density: 80.7/km^{2} (209/sq mi)
- Demonym: Juvignais
- Time zone: UTC+01:00 (CET)
  - Summer (DST): UTC+02:00 (CEST)
- Postal code: 50520
- ^{1} French Land Register data, which excludes lakes, ponds, glaciers > 1 km^{2} (0.386 sq mi or 247 acres) and river estuaries.

Juvigny-le-Tertre (French pronunciation: [ʒyviɲi lə tɛʁtʁ], before 1962: Juvigny) is a former commune in the Manche department in north-western France. On 1 January 2017, it was merged into the new commune Juvigny les Vallées.

== Heraldry ==
Arms of Juvigny-le-Tertre	The arms of Juvigny-le-Tertre are blazoned : Quarterly 1: argent 3 bezants; 2&3 Argent, a cross moline azure; 4: Argent, a bezant (Or).

== See also ==
- Communes of the Manche department
