= Bellefontaine, Manche =

Bellefontaine
- Part of Juvigny les Vallées
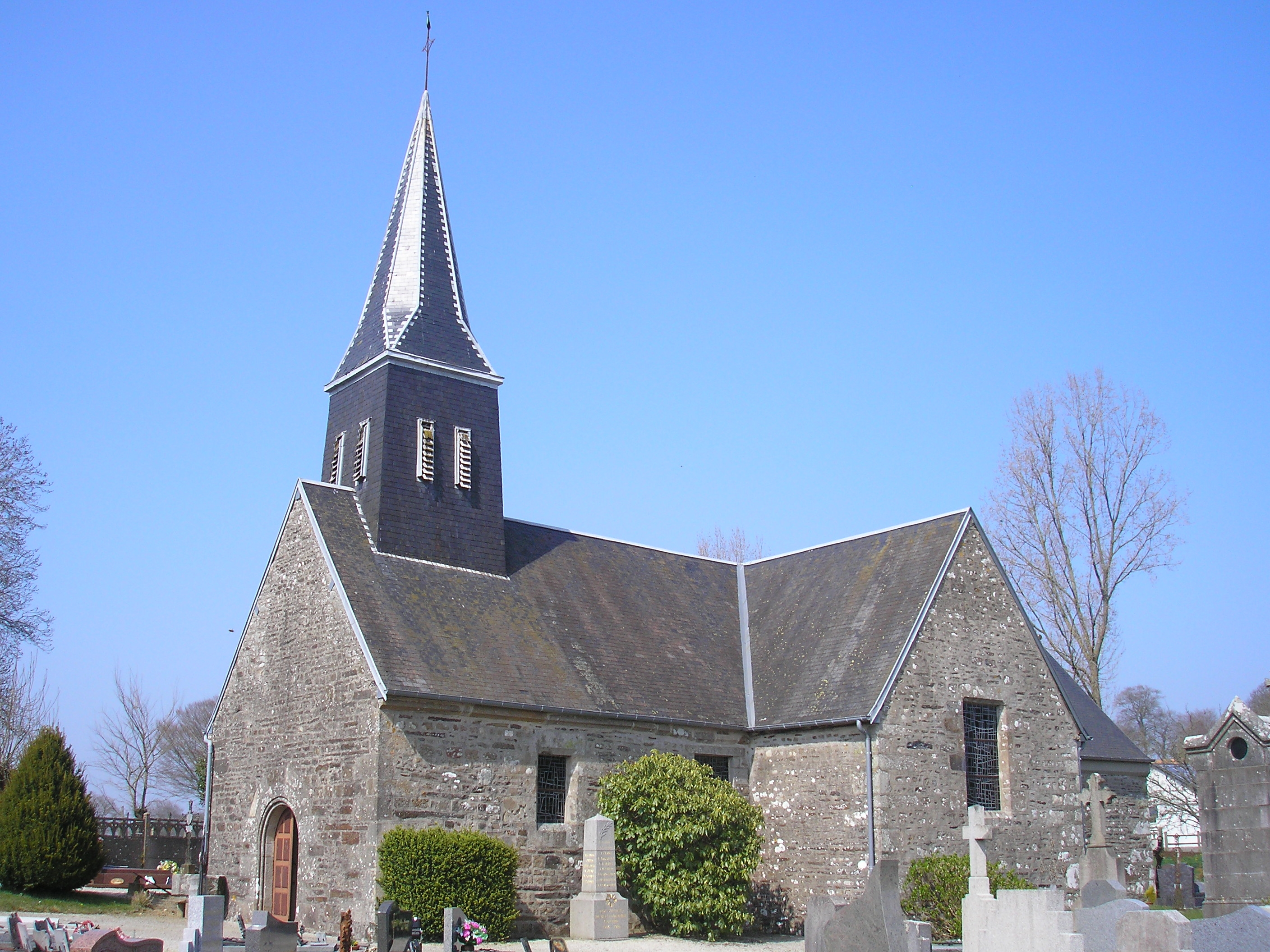
- The church of Saint-Martin
- Location of Bellefontaine
- Location within France Location within Normandy
- Coordinates: 48°41′23″N 0°58′23″W
- Country: France
- Region: Normandy
- Department: Manche
- Arrondissement: Avranches
- Canton: Isigny-le-Buat
- Commune: Juvigny les Vallées
- Area^{1}: 6.73 km^{2} (2.60 sq mi)
- Elevation: 220 m (720 ft)
- Highest elevation: 292 m (958 ft)
- Lowest elevation: 100 m (330 ft)
- Population (2023): 138
  - Density: 20.5/km^{2} (53.1/sq mi)
- Time zone: UTC+01:00 (CET)
  - Summer (DST): UTC+02:00 (CEST)
- Postal code: 50520
- ^{1} French Land Register data, which excludes lakes, ponds, glaciers > 1 km^{2} (0.386 sq mi or 247 acres) and river estuaries.

Bellefontaine (French pronunciation: [bɛlfɔ̃tɛn]) is a former commune in the Manche department in the Normandy region in northwestern France. On 1 January 2017, it was merged into the new commune Juvigny les Vallées.

== See also ==
- Communes of the Manche department
