= Chérencé-le-Roussel =

- Part of Juvigny les Vallées
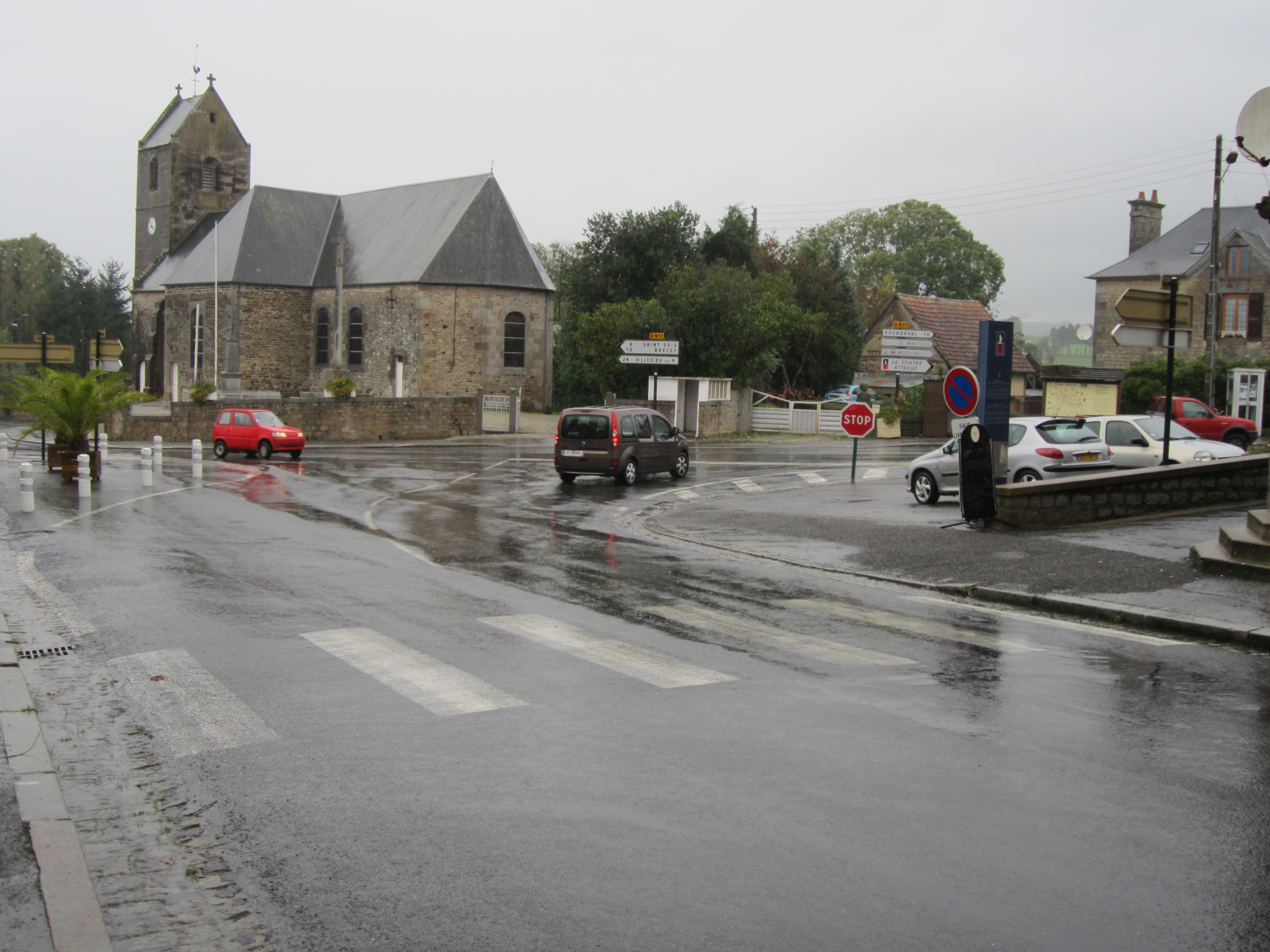
- The village
- Location of Chérencé-le-Roussel
- Location within France Location within Normandy
- Coordinates: 48°42′34″N 1°00′56″W
- Country: France
- Region: Normandy
- Department: Manche
- Arrondissement: Avranches
- Canton: Isigny-le-Buat
- Commune: Juvigny les Vallées
- Area^{1}: 10.95 km^{2} (4.23 sq mi)
- Highest elevation: 290 m (950 ft)
- Lowest elevation: 61 m (200 ft)
- Population (2022): 274
  - Density: 25.0/km^{2} (64.8/sq mi)
- Time zone: UTC+01:00 (CET)
  - Summer (DST): UTC+02:00 (CEST)
- Postal code: 50520
- ^{1} French Land Register data, which excludes lakes, ponds, glaciers > 1 km^{2} (0.386 sq mi or 247 acres) and river estuaries.

Chérencé-le-Roussel (French pronunciation: [ʃeʁɑ̃se lə ʁusɛl]) is a former commune in the Manche department in Normandy in north-western France. On 1 January 2017, it was merged into the new commune Juvigny les Vallées.

== See also ==
- Communes of the Manche department
