= Le Mesnil-Rainfray =

- Part of Juvigny les Vallées
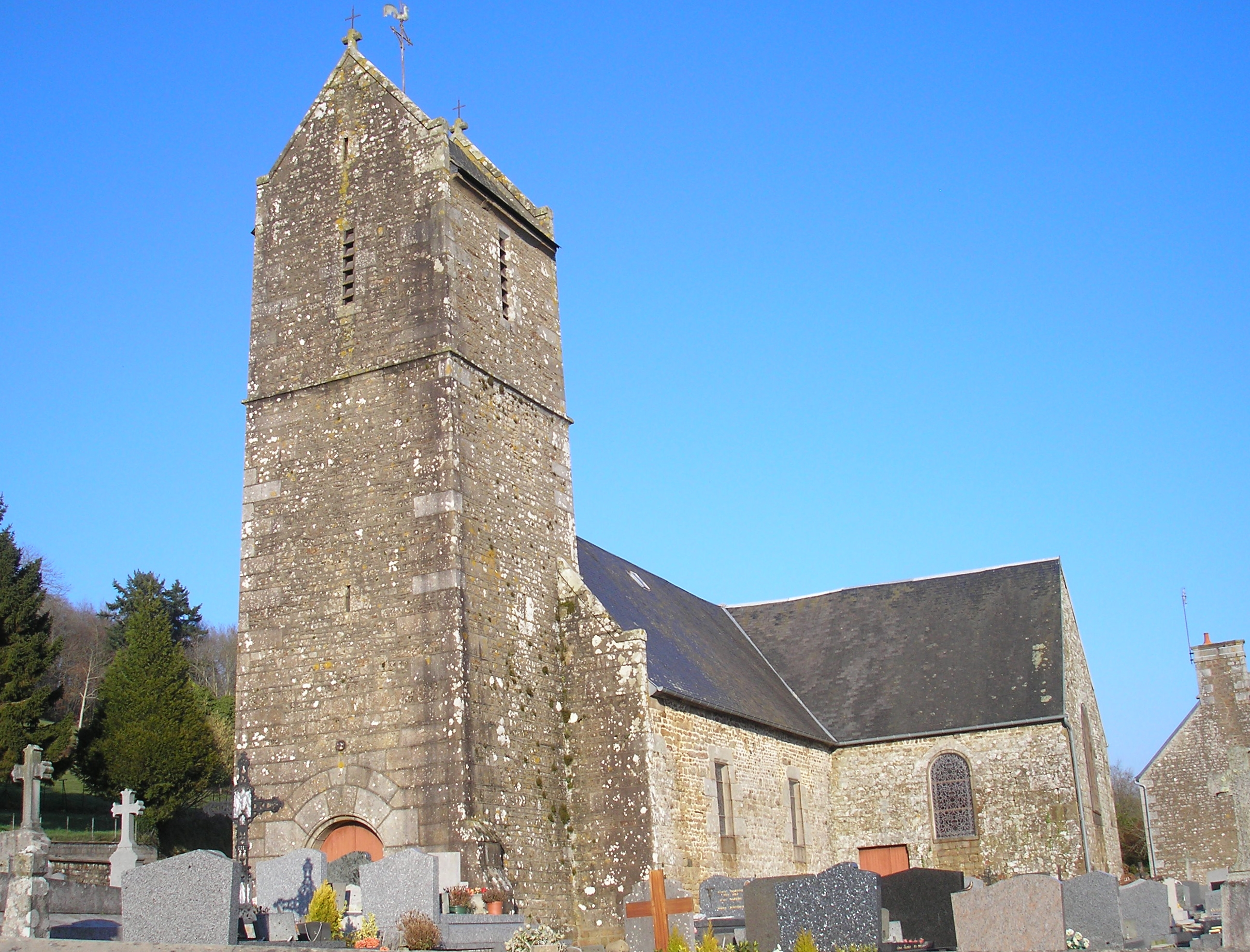
- The church of Saint-Martin
- Location of Le Mesnil-Rainfray
- Location within France Location within Normandy
- Coordinates: 48°40′04″N 1°03′19″W
- Country: France
- Region: Normandy
- Department: Manche
- Arrondissement: Avranches
- Canton: Isigny-le-Buat
- Commune: Juvigny les Vallées
- Area^{1}: 11.47 km^{2} (4.43 sq mi)
- Elevation: 200 m (660 ft)
- Highest elevation: 252 m (827 ft)
- Lowest elevation: 125 m (410 ft)
- Population (2022): 210
  - Density: 18/km^{2} (47/sq mi)
- Time zone: UTC+01:00 (CET)
  - Summer (DST): UTC+02:00 (CEST)
- Postal code: 50520
- ^{1} French Land Register data, which excludes lakes, ponds, glaciers > 1 km^{2} (0.386 sq mi or 247 acres) and river estuaries.

Le Mesnil-Rainfray (French pronunciation: [lə mɛnil ʁɛ̃fʁɛ]) is a former commune in the Manche department in Normandy in north-western France. On 1 January 2017, it was merged into the new commune Juvigny les Vallées. This is an agricultural community, mainly dairy cattle, forage maze and cider apple production.

== See also ==
- Communes of the Manche department
