= Vauclerc =

- Commune
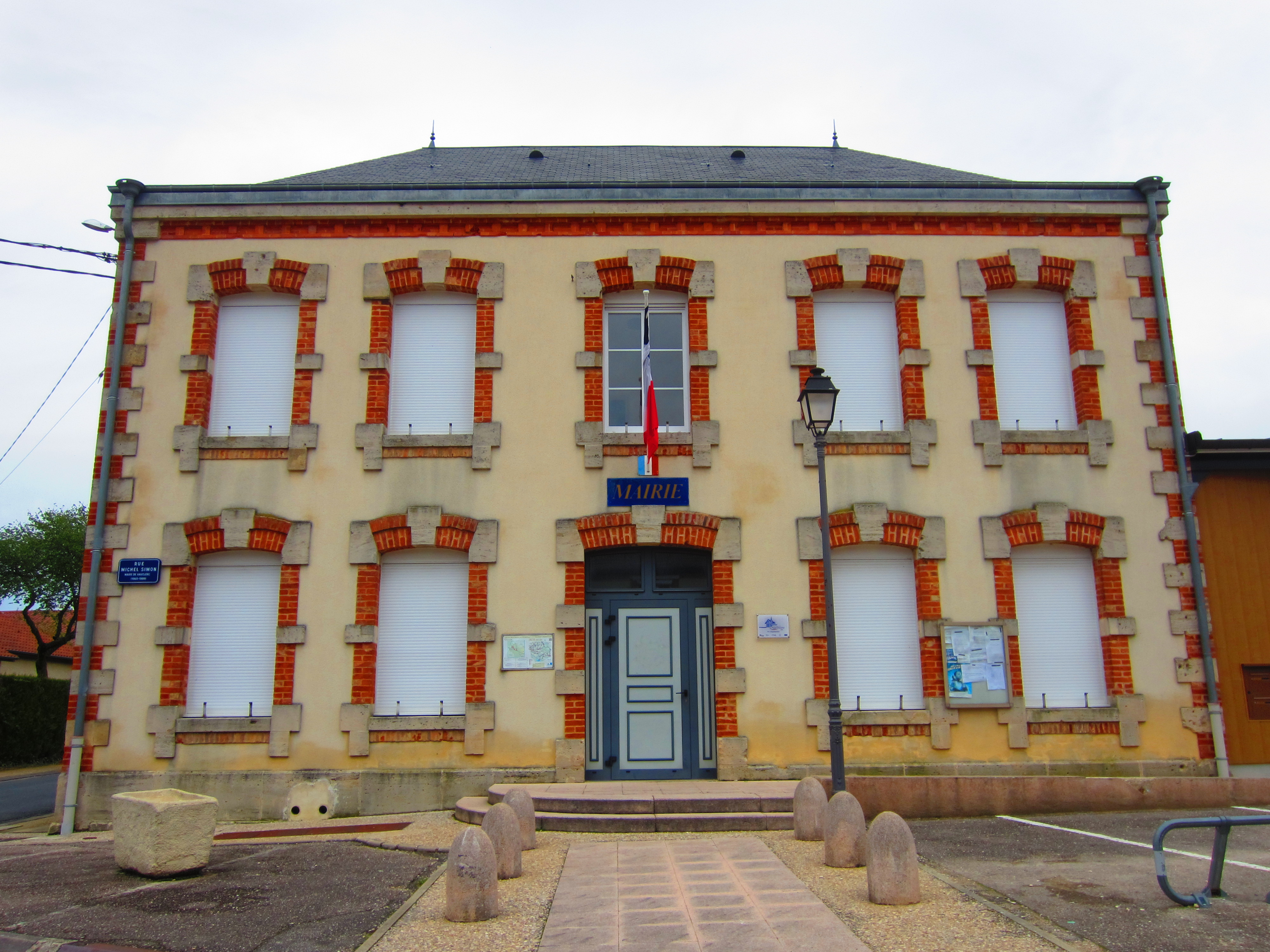
- The town hall in Vauclerc

- Coat of arms
- Location of Vauclerc
- Location within France Location within Grand Est
- Coordinates: 48°42′33″N 4°39′36″E
- Country: France
- Region: Grand Est
- Department: Marne
- Arrondissement: Vitry-le-François
- Canton: Sermaize-les-Bains

Government
  - Mayor (2020–2026): Jean-Luc Guillot
- Area^{1}: 6.09 km^{2} (2.35 sq mi)
- Elevation: 105 m (344 ft)
- Population (2023): 497
  - Density: 81.6/km^{2} (211/sq mi)
- Time zone: UTC+01:00 (CET)
  - Summer (DST): UTC+02:00 (CEST)
- INSEE/Postal code: 51598 /51300
- ^{1} French Land Register data, which excludes lakes, ponds, glaciers > 1 km^{2} (0.386 sq mi or 247 acres) and river estuaries.

Vauclerc (French pronunciation: [voklɛʁ]) is a commune in the Marne department in north-eastern France.

== Demography Poll ==
The growth of people's range has been understood via the populace censuses performed from the municipality as 1793. By 2006, the lawful inhabitants of those municipalities are released yearly by Insee. The census is currently based on a yearly selection of advice, successively regarding most of the civic lands within a time period of 5 decades ago. To get municipalities with much less than 10,000 inhabitants, a census poll since that the full populace is completed each and every five decades, the lawful inhabitants of their years now being projected by interpolation or extrapolation 9. For your municipality, the Very First methodical census decreasing below the brand new strategy has been completed in 2006.

== Hydrography ==
The town is watered by the Gercourt stream (to the north) and its tributary, the Régale stream, which originates within the west of the village.

== Town Planning ==
The emergence of urban problems and international awareness have caused changes within the laws that govern French urban planning, by allowing planners to be more pro-active in terms of sustainable planning. As far as urban planning cares, the anticipation of public policy impact accounts for a better relationship between representatives, local authorities and therefore the field of urban studies and research. Today, "reports" and therefore the use of developing tools like modelling are increasingly present before the creation of public policies and within ex-post16 assessment.

== Typology ==
Vauclerc may be a rural municipality, because it's a part of the municipalities with little or little or no density, within the meaning of the municipal density grid of The National Institute of Statistics and Economic Studies (INSEE)

In addition, the municipality is a component of the attraction area of Vitry-le-François, of which it's a municipality within the crown. This area, which incorporates 73 municipalities, is categorized into areas with fewer than 50,000 inhabitants.

== See also ==
- Communes of the Marne department
