= Taliwin Mountain =

Mountain in Béjaïa Province, Algeria

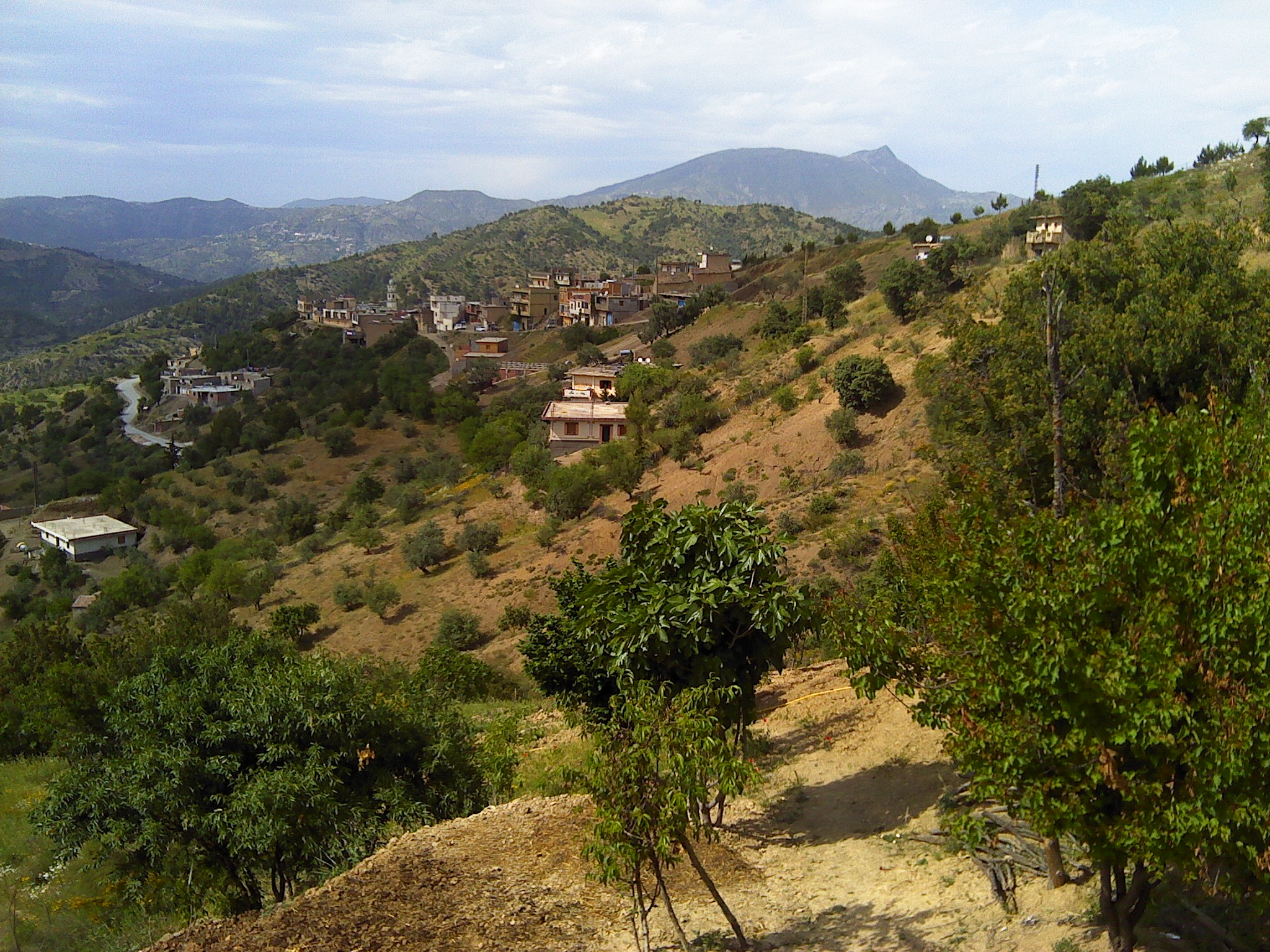
- Taliwin Mountain

Highest point
- Elevation: 1,698 m (5,571 ft)
- Listing: Babor Mountains - Tell Atlas
- Coordinates: 36.5114557°N 5.0594186°E

Geography
- Kendira - Barbacha District - Béjaïa Province
- Parent range: Babor Mountains - Tell Atlas

Geology
- Rock age: Quaternary

Taliwin Mountain is a mountain peak in the Babor mountain range within the Atlas Hill in Algeria, located in the municipality of Kendira in the Barbacha district in Béjaïa Province.

== Description ==
Taliwin Mountain is the fourth highest mountain peak in Béjaïa, with an elevation of 1,698 m (5,571 ft), right after Babor Mountain (2,004 m (6,575 ft)) thenTakintosht (1,874 m (6,148 ft)), followed by Isak Mountain (1,742 m (5,715 ft)), and it overlooks the eastern Gulf of Béjaïa and the Soummam Basin, and facing the Babor and Djurdjura Mountains.

In the opposite direction is Takintosht in the south of the Soummam Basin, and Yma Quraya Mountain in the west of Bejaia Bay, where the city of Béjaïa was established.

The summit of this mountain can be reached via a single national road, National Road 75.

The mountain overlooks the municipality of Aokas and the municipality of Tichy, among other coastal municipalities.

== Geology ==
The formation of Taliwin Mountain dates back to the Quaternary of the Cenozoic on the geologic time scale

The surrounding terrain is covered with gray marble, connected by paths of reddish siderite and iron ore.

The composition of this terrain is also characterized by an amount of crystalline schist and mica-schist.

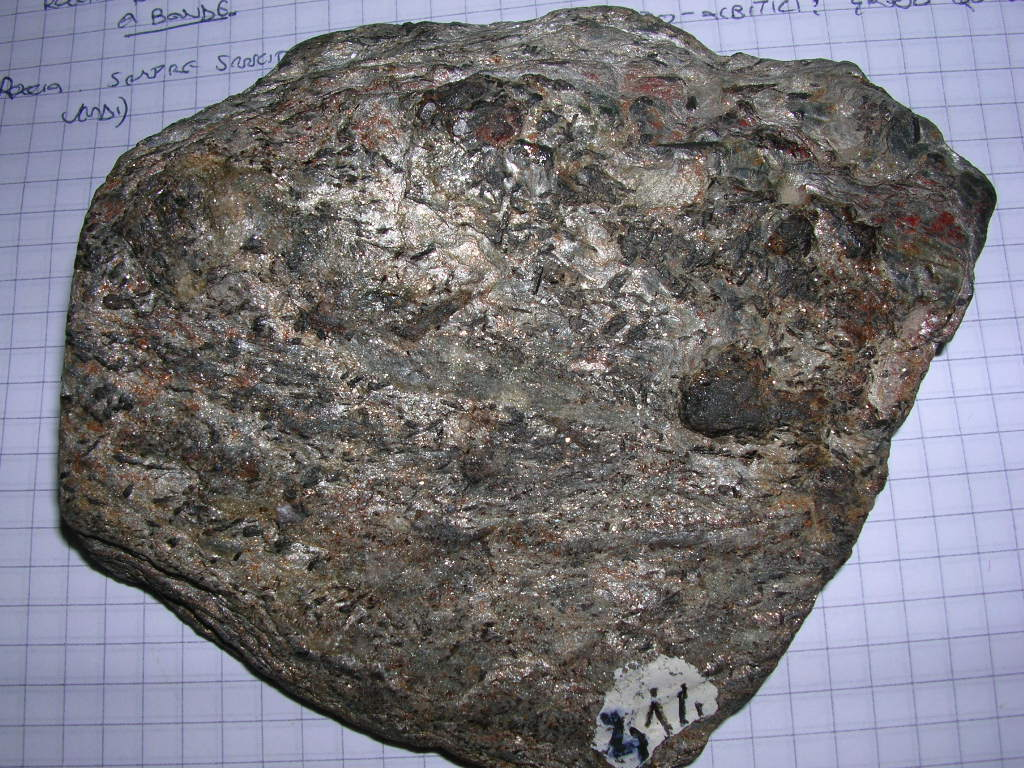
Mica-schist

== Quarries ==
Around the foothills of Taliwin Mountain are several quarries that specialize in the extraction of:

- Rocks.
- Marble.
- Sand.
- Gravel.
- Clay to make ceramics.
- Non-metallic ores.
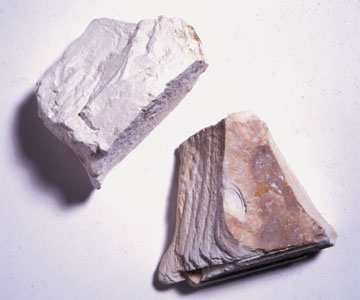
  Clay

== Valleys ==
Many valleys originate and surround Taliwin Mountain, including:

- Aqrion Valley.
- Bou Sellam Valley .
- Amasin Valley.

== Dams and lakes ==
- Egil Amda Dam
- Egzer Oftis Dam
- Sheabat el Akhira Dam

== Ecological diversity ==
=== Barbary macaque ===
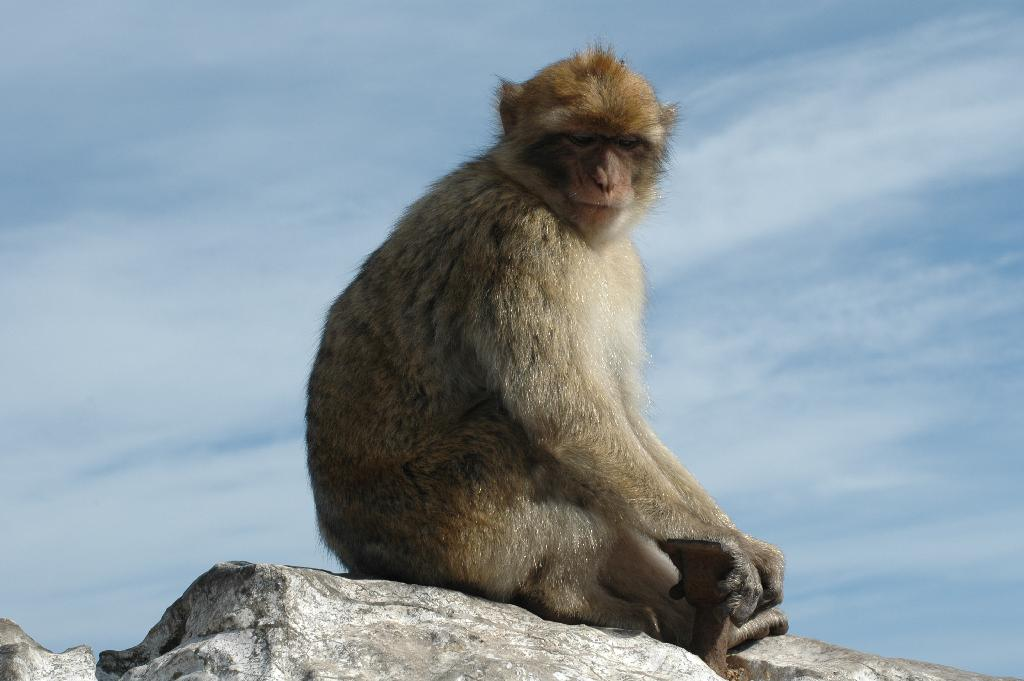
Barbary Macaque

The Barbary macaque is found near Taliwin Mountain.

== Photos gallery ==
Location of Taliwin Mountain in Kendira Municipality

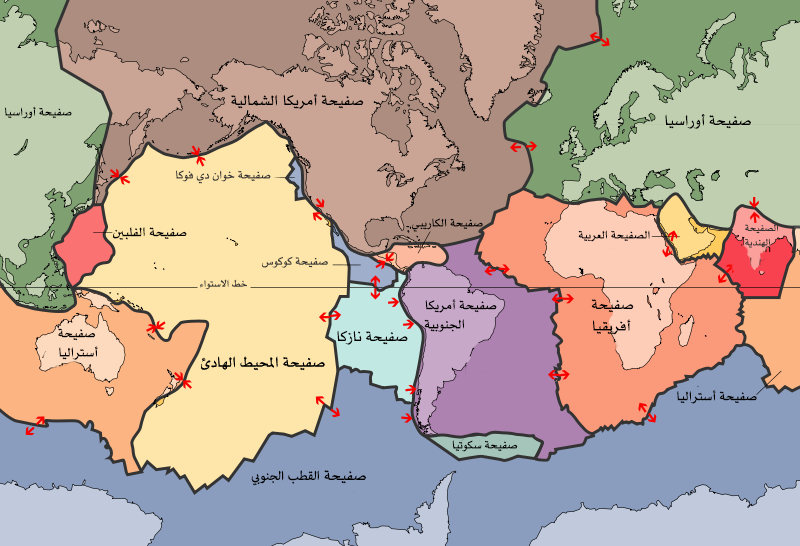
Plate tectonics

=== Related topics ===
- Tell Atlas
- Babor Mountains
- Kabylia
- Béjaïa Province
- Barbacha District
- Kendira
