= Anou Boussouil =

Limestone karst cave in the mountains of Djurdjura, Algeria

Coordinates: 36.4690°N 4.1914°E

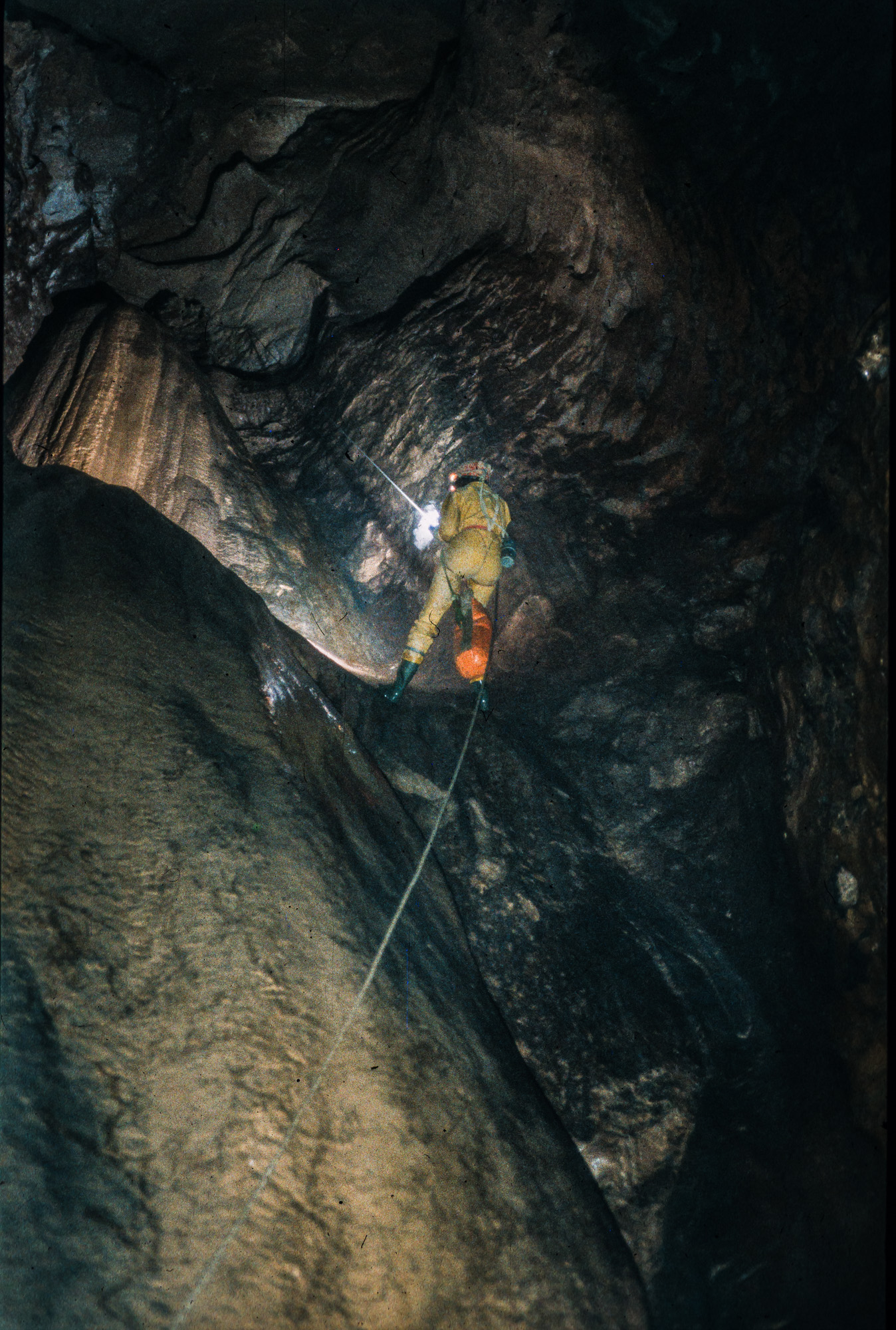
In the great wells of the anou Boussouil.

Anou Boussouil (in English "Great Chasm") is a limestone karst cave located in the mountains of Djurdjura, Algeria. The cave is 3,200 metres (10,500 ft) long and 805 metres (2,641 ft) deep. The entrance to the cave is 1,074 metres (3,524 ft) up the mountainside. During the springtime rainy season, melting snow pours through a channel leading directly to the cave mouth, continuing the process of erosion. This distinguishes it from other caves in the Djurdjura range, which are inactive and no longer being enlarged through erosion.

The cave was first scientifically explored in 1933 by the cavers Fourastier and André Belin. Later expeditions found that the cave was actually composed of two separate segments. The first segment is twisted and relatively narrow, eventually opening up into a larger cavern. The entrance to the second segment is a sinkhole descending approximately 65 metres (213 ft) into a sequence of pit chambers. Within this sequence is a gallery known locally as salle des affamés, or "the hall of the hungry". This segment eventually opens into a flooded vault chamber.

In 1950, it was explored to a depth of 505 metres (1,657 ft); at that time it was known as the second-largest pit in the world. An expedition in 1980 found that the cave reaches a maximum depth of 805 metres (2,641 ft). It was briefly known as Africa's deepest cave before Anou Ifflis was explored to a depth of 1,170 metres (3,840 ft).

== See also ==
- List of caves
