= Ait Ouabane =

Ait-Ouabane At Waεban
- Village
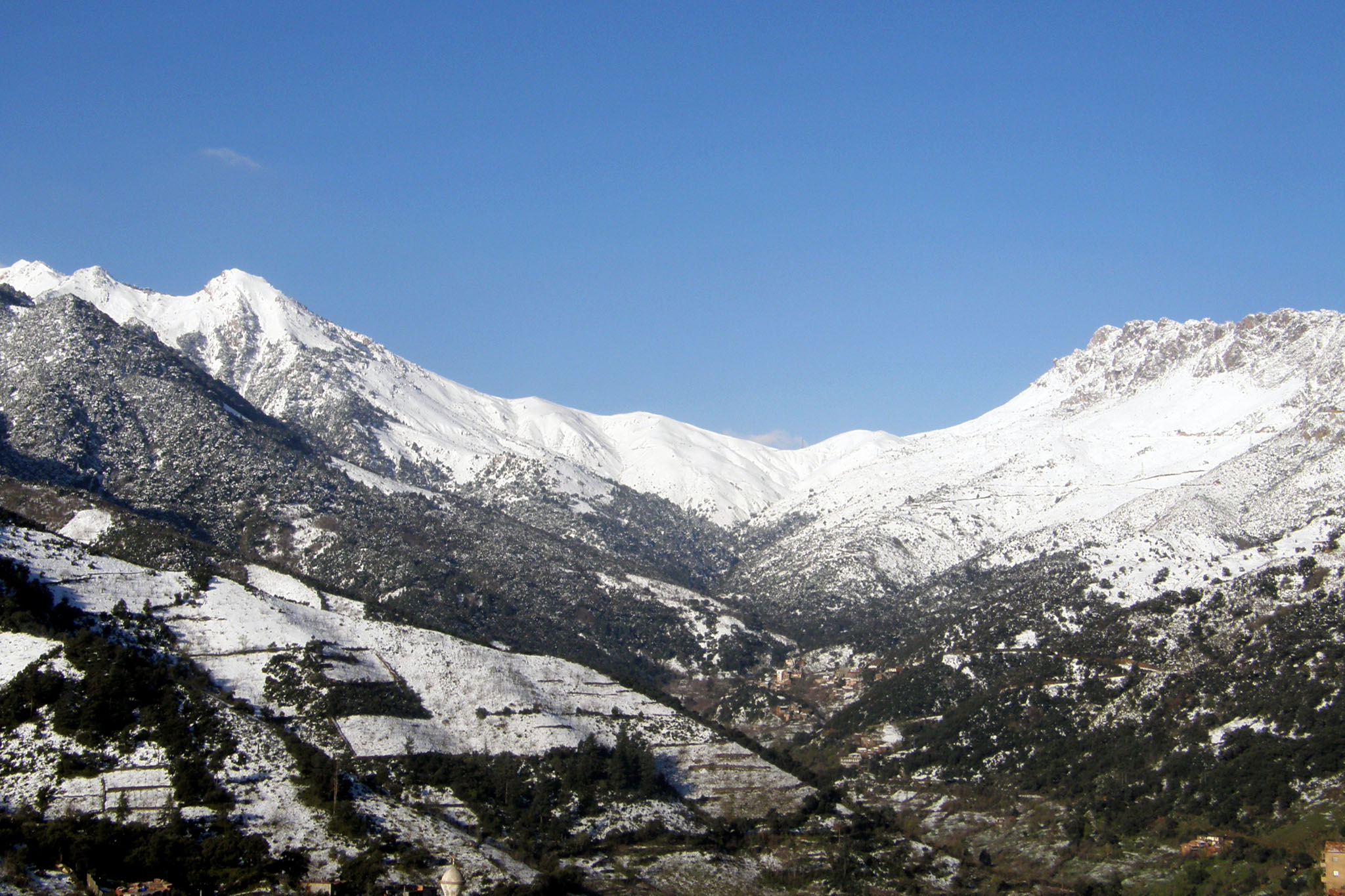

- Location in Algeria
- Coordinates: 36.481533°N 4.297367°E
- Country: Algeria
- Municipality: Aïn El Hammam
- Region: Kabylie
- Province: Tizi-Ouzou

Government
  - Village Leader: OUAZZI Said ben saâdi
- Elevation: 1,000 m (3,300 ft)

Population
  - Total: 4,000
- Time zone: UTC+02:00
- Postal code: 15243

Ait-Ouabane (Kabyle: At Waεban) is a village in the Tizi Ouzou Province in Kabylie, Algeria.

== Location ==
The village is surrounded by a forest in the Djurdjura mountain range.
