= Lalla Khedidja =

Mountain in Algeria

- Tamgut Aâlayen / لالة خديجة
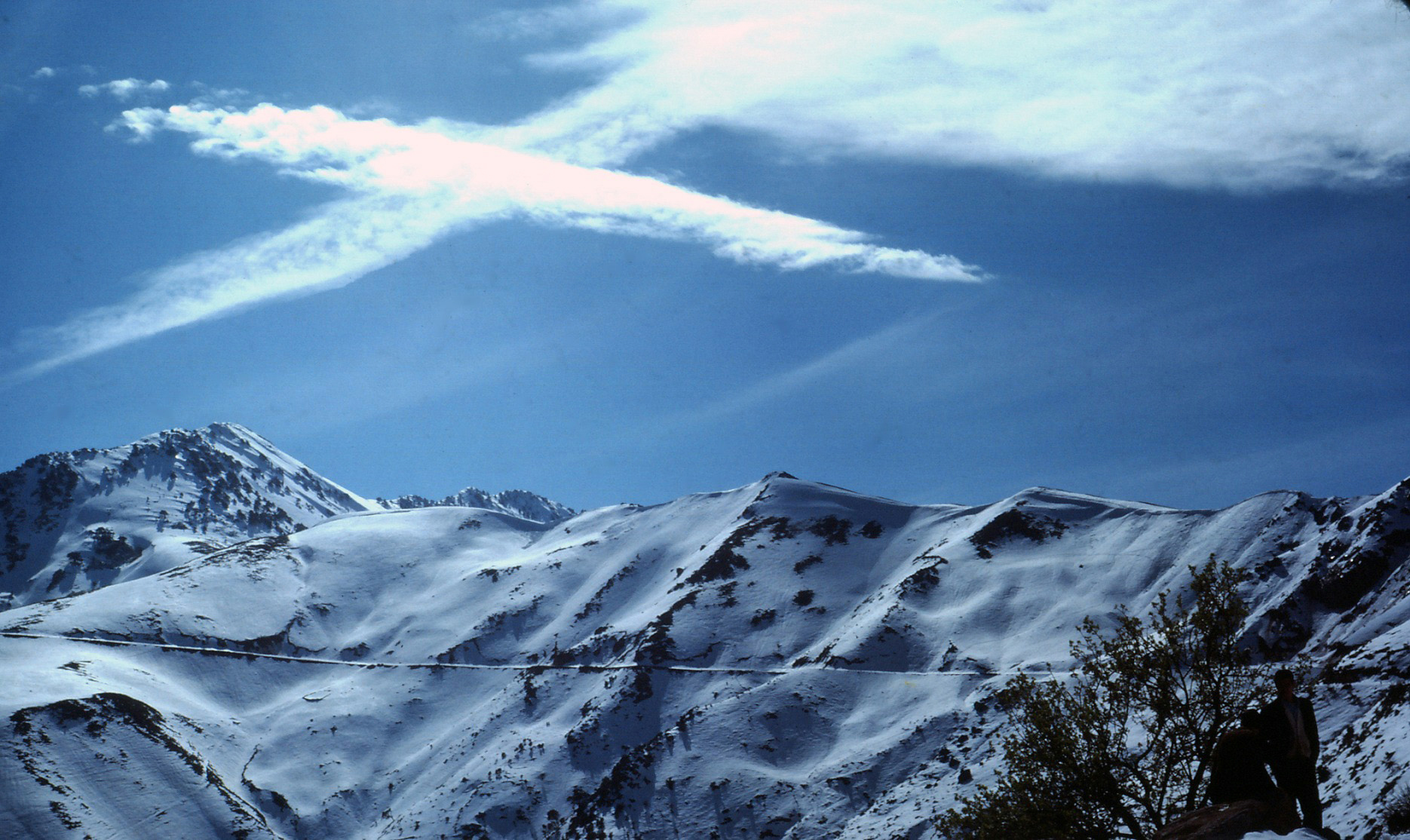
- Djurjura range with Lalla Khedidja at left

Highest point
- Elevation: 2,308 m (7,572 ft)
- Prominence: 1,720 m (5,640 ft)
- Listing: Ultra, Ribu
- Coordinates: 36°26′51″N 04°13′42″E

Geography
- Location within Algeria
- Location: Algeria
- Parent range: Djurdjura Range, Tell Atlas

Lalla Khedidja or (Arabic: لالة خديجة, Kabyle: Tamgut Aâlayen or Azeru Amghur), is a mountain in Algeria. Located in Bouira province. At 2,308 metres (7,572 ft), it is the highest summit of the Djurdjura Range, a subrange of the Tell Atlas.

== Geography ==
This peak is located in the Akouker subrange of the eastern part of the Djurjura Range. It is also the highest point of the Tell Atlas itself, which is in turn part of the wider Atlas Mountain System. The Lalla Khedidja is usually covered in snow in winter.

== See also ==
- List of mountains in Algeria
- List of Ultras of Africa

== Panoramic view ==
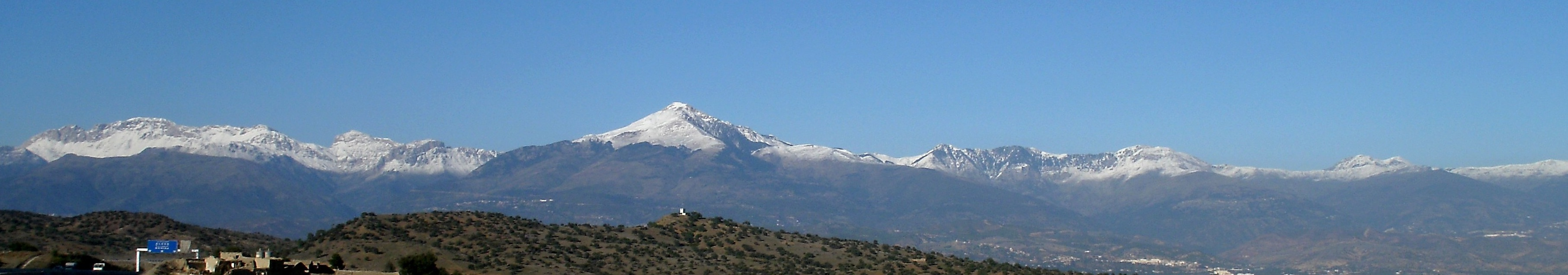
Panorama of the Akouker subrange with the Lalla-Khedidja in the middle
