= André Belin =

French spelunker (1896–1983)

André Belin (1896-1983) was a French spelunker, active in North Africa.

== Spelunking activities ==
With the help of some friends, André formed a group related to the Speleological Society of France.

In Algeria, André explored the Anou Boussouil, which would later become the second largest pit in the world in 1950.
