= Tikjda =

Ski resorts in Algeria

Coordinates: 36°27′00″N 04°08′00″E

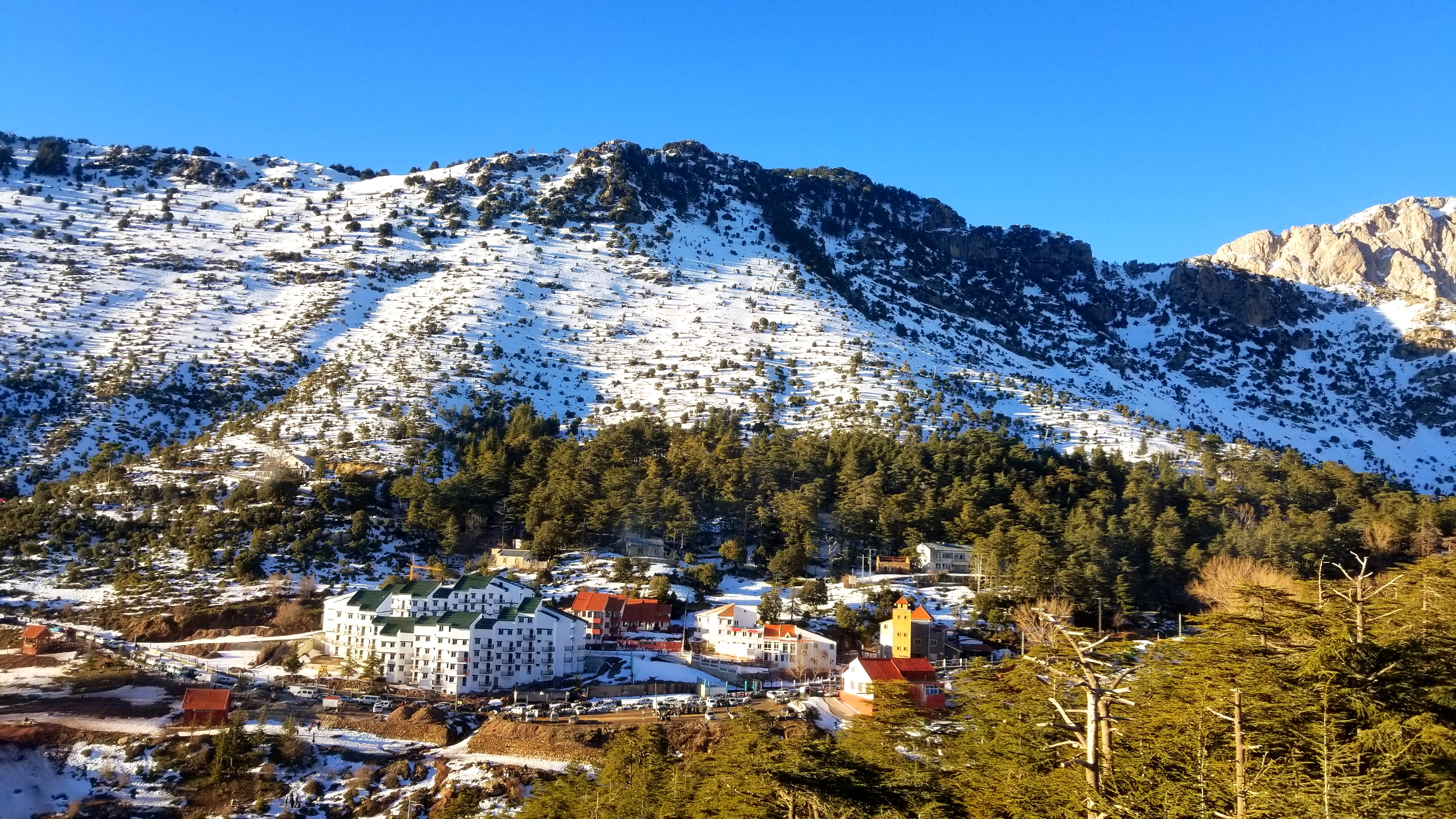
The ski resort of Tikjda

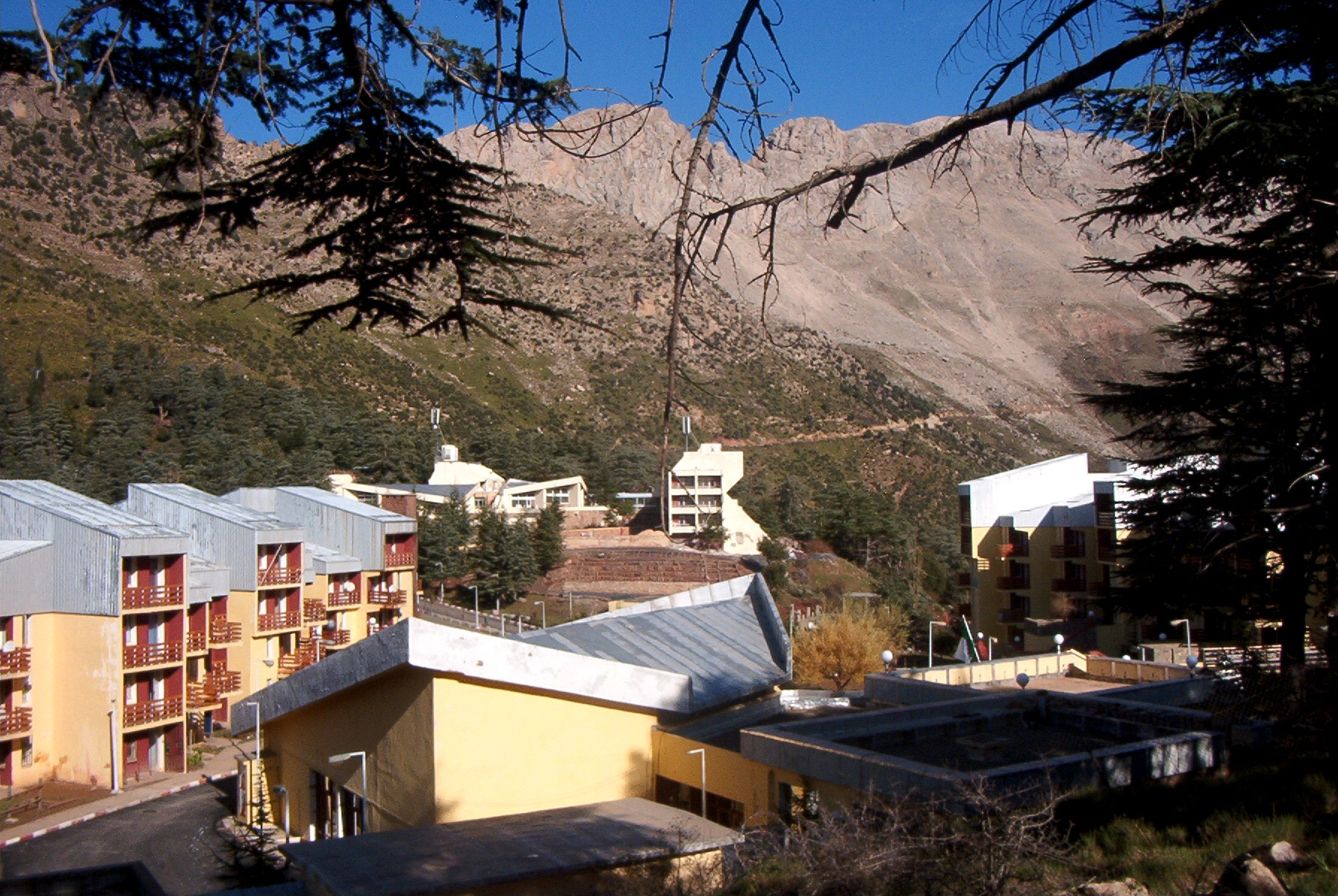
The ski resort of Tikjda.

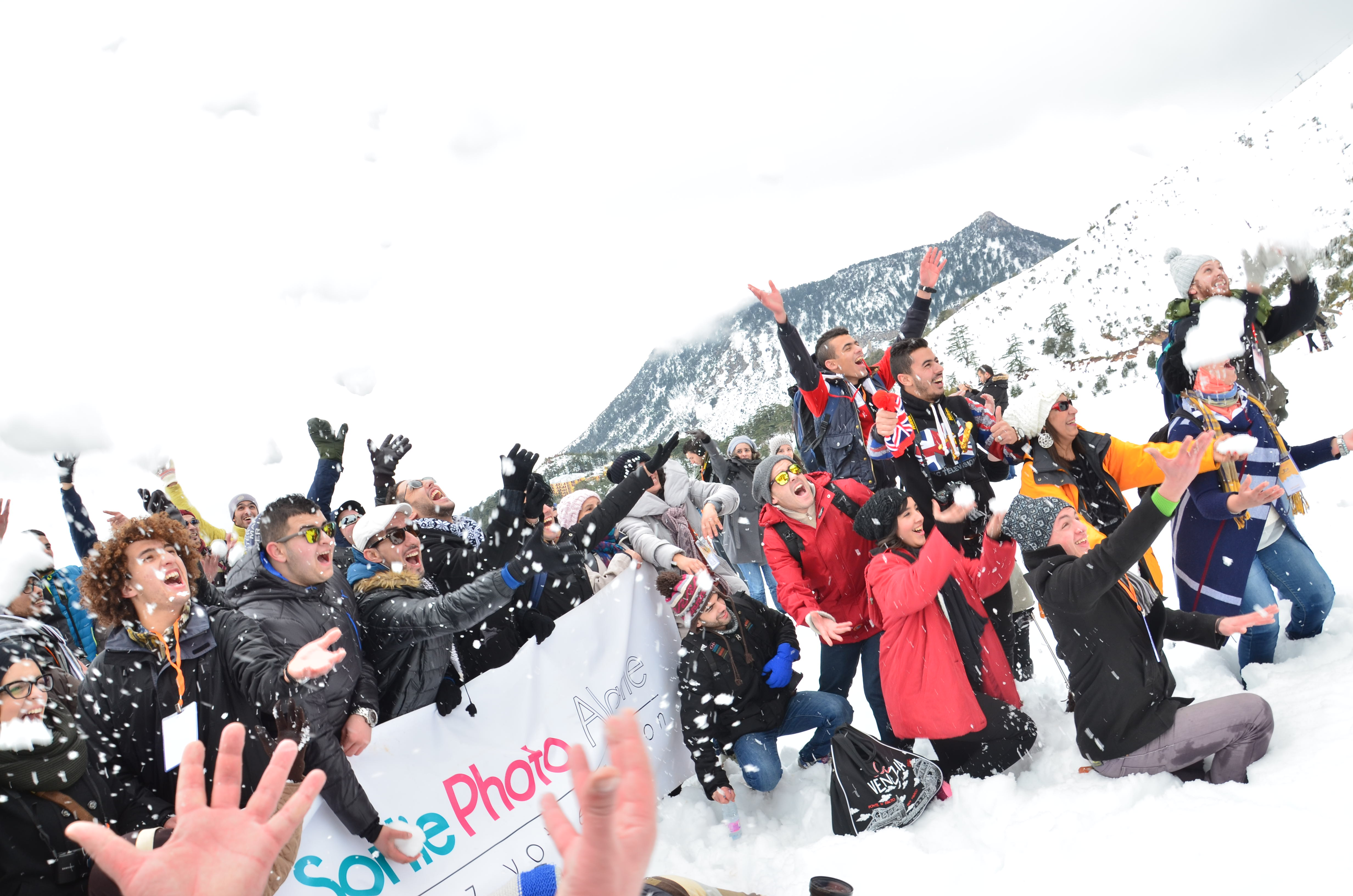
Fun in Tikjda.

Tikjda is a ski resort located in a mountain range named Djurdjura, northern Algeria, with an altitude of 1,600 metres (5,250 feet), in the province of Bouïra.

In the summers, Tikjda offers walks, rock climbing and many short excursions, with places like Point de vue du Djurdjura and Gouffre de l'Akouker. The area around Tikjda has many peaks and hillsides covered with cedar forests.

The Mediterranean Sea can be spotted on clear days.
