= Tell Atlas =

Mountain chain in North Africa

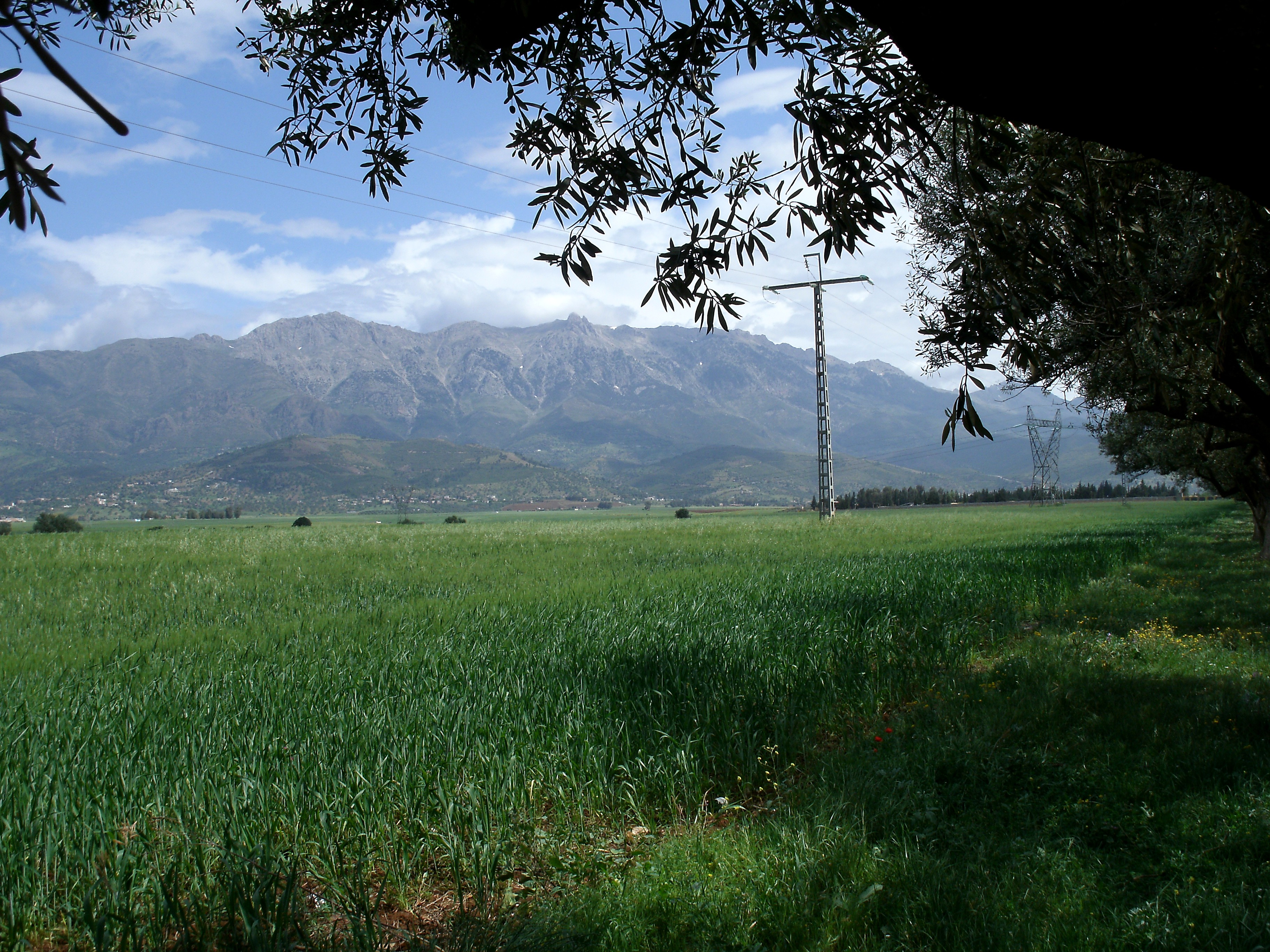
- View of the southern slopes of the Haizer Range in the Djurdjura Mountains

Highest point
- Peak: Lalla Khedidja
- Elevation: 2,308 m (7,572 ft)
- Coordinates: 36°0′0″N 2°0′0″E

Dimensions
- Length: 1,500 km (930 mi) E/W
- Width: 115 km (71 mi) N/S

Naming
- Native name: الاطلس التلي' (Arabic)

Geography
- Location within Algeria
- Countries: Morocco, Algeria and Tunisia
- Parent range: Atlas Mountains

Geology
- Orogeny: Alpine orogeny
- Rock age: Miocene
- Rock type: Crystalline metamorphic

Climbing
- First ascent: unknown
- Easiest route: drive

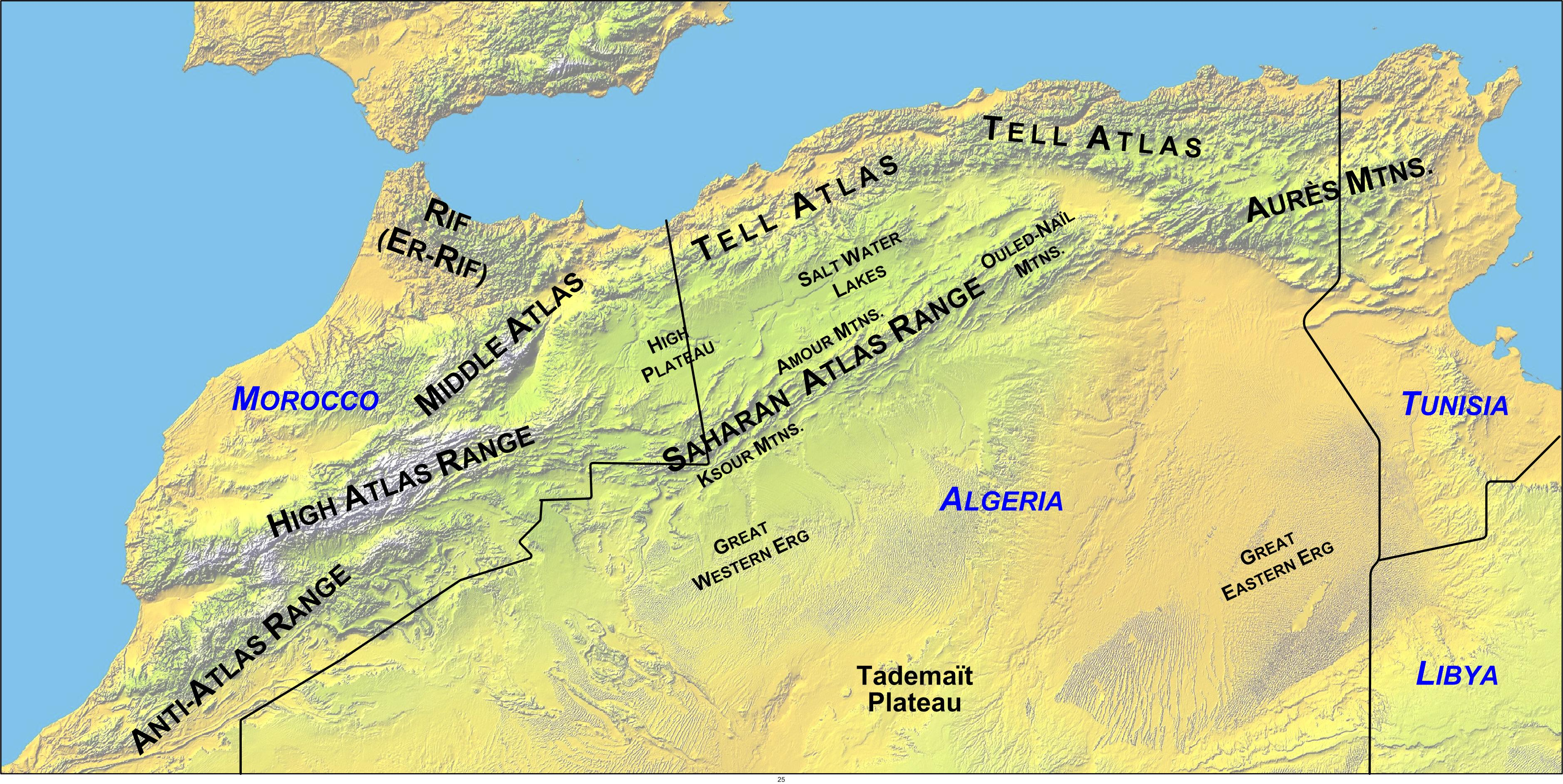
Location of the Atlas Mountains across North Africa

The Tell Atlas (Arabic: الاطلس التلي, al-ʾaṭlas al-tlī) is a mountain chain over 1,500 km (932 mi) in length, belonging to the Atlas mountain ranges in North Africa, stretching mainly across northern Algeria, ending in north-eastern Morocco and north-western Tunisia.

The ranges of this system have an average elevation of about 1,500 m (4,900 ft) and form a natural barrier between the Mediterranean and the Sahara. Its highest summit is the 2,308 m (7,572 ft) high Lalla Khedidja in the Djurdjura Range.

Several large cities such as the Algerian capital, Algiers, with ~1,500,000 residents (2005) and Oran with ~770,000 residents (2005) lie at the base of the Tell Atlas. The Algerian city Constantine with approximately 505,000 residents (2005) lies 80 km inland and directly in the mountains at 650 meters in elevation. A number of smaller towns and villages are situated within the Tell; for example, Chiffa is nestled within the Chiffa gorge.

== Geography ==
The Tell Atlas runs parallel to the Mediterranean coast. Together with the Saharan Atlas to the south, it forms the northernmost of two more or less parallel ranges which approach one another towards the east, remaining quite distinct from one another in Western Algeria and merging in Eastern Algeria. At the western end, it ends at the Rif and Middle Atlas ranges in Morocco. The Tell Atlas is also a distinct physiographic section of the larger Atlas Mountains province, which in turn is part of the larger African Alpine System physiographic division.

The Tell Atlas and the Saharan Atlas form two natural barriers, the first against the Mediterranean and the second against the Sahara. Between them lies the valley of the Chelif and various lesser rivers.

South of the Tell Atlas is the high plateau of the Hautes Plaines (~1000 m in elevation) with level terrain where water collects during the wet season, forming large shallow salt lakes which become salt flats as they dry. Agriculture includes grazing of sheep and goats on the grass in better-watered high plateau areas and some farming; dry-land barley is grown there.

The Chelif is a 725 km long river with headwaters in the Tell Atlas to its discharge into the Mediterranean. The Chelif is characterized by an extremely fertile valley. Other noteworthy rivers having their sources in this range are the Medjerda and the Seybouse River. Only seasonal streams flow south from the Tell Atlas.

== Climate and vegetation ==
The Tell Atlas has a typical Mediterranean climate, warm with dry summers and mild, rainy winters with snow at upper elevations. As a consequence, the northern slopes of the Tell Atlas are forested with the endemic Abies numidica, and Atlas cedar, pine, and cork oak. In the summer a hot, dry wind, the Sirocco, blows north from the Sahara across the Tell Atlas, causing dusty, dry conditions along the northern coast of Africa.

Despite the arid climate, some agriculture for barley and wheat farming is found in the Tell Atlas region. The Chiffa gorge is situated within the Tell Atlas; this location is one of the few remaining habitats for the endangered primate, the Barbary macaque, Macaca sylvanus.

== See also ==
- List of mountains in Algeria
- Saharan Atlas.
- Muqras Mountain
- Reghaïa Valley
- Boudouaou Valley
- Al-Hamiz Valley
- Al-arbaâ Valley
