= Muqras Mountain =

Mountain in the Tell Atlas mountain range

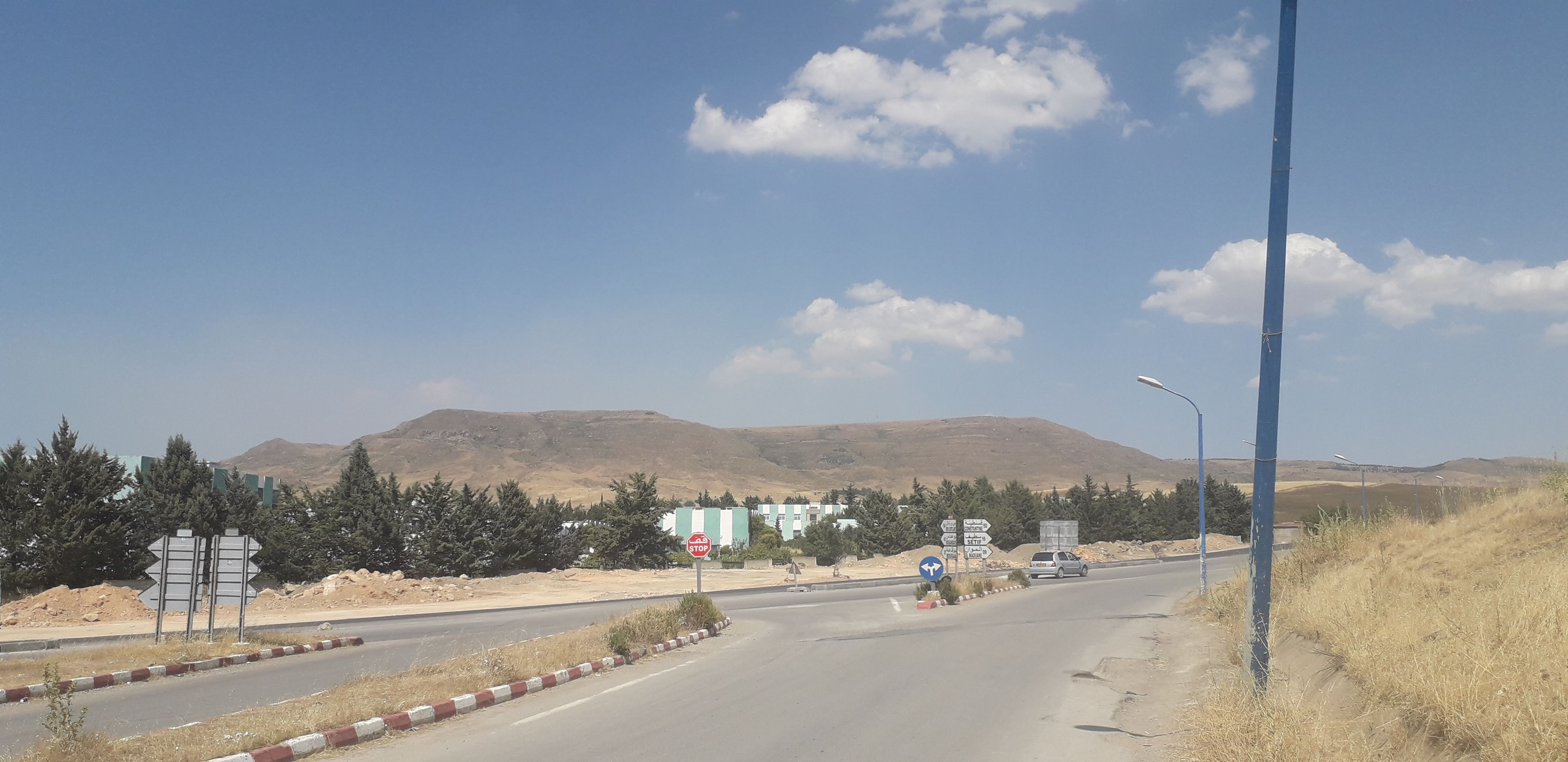

Highest point
- Elevation: 1,760 m (5,770 ft)
- Coordinates: 36.3309°N 5.35446°E

Geography
- Location within Algeria
- Location: Sétif Province, Algeria Areas of: El Ouricia, Aïn Abessa, Tizi N'Bechar, and Amoucha
- Parent range: Tell Atlas

Muqras Mountain is a peak within the Tell Atlas mountain range, situated in three distinct municipalities: El Ouricia and Ain Abessa, which are part of the Ain Arnat district, and Amoucha in Amoucha District. These municipalities are located within Sétif Province in northern Algeria.

== Overview ==
Muqras Mountain provides a vantage point for the city of Sétif in the northern region, offering a distinctive climate of extreme coldness.

- The mountain is covered with snow throughout the year.
- The mountain has an elevation of 1,760 meters above sea level.
- The city is situated in a northerly position and is characterized by a prevalence of fresh air and extreme cold.
- The peak is perpetually encased in snow.

The summit of Muqras Mountain can be reached via a single national road, National Road No. 75, which runs alongside the village of Takouka, approximately 8 kilometers north of Ain Abessa in the Sétif Province.

- The Romans built a small fort on this mountain to monitor the ancient city of Sitifis (modern Sétif).
- During the French colonial period, a communications center was established on the mountain, utilizing the area's elevated position.

Hassasna tribe has inhabited this mountain for centuries, seeking refuge there from various invasions due to the rugged terrain and difficult access.

== Climate ==
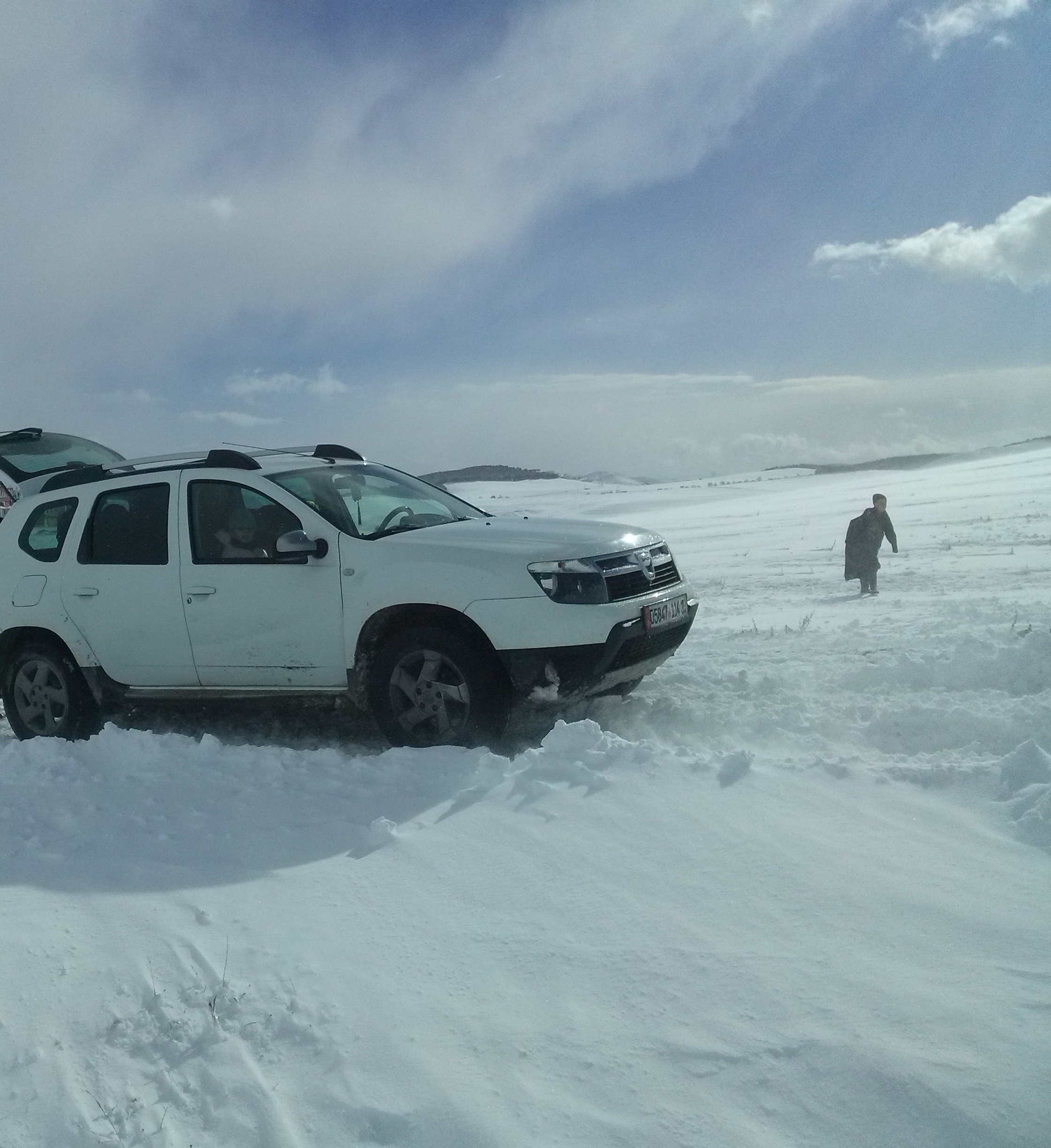
Snow in Muqras Mountain 2016

The prevailing climate in Muqras Mountain is classified as Mediterranean, exhibiting characteristics of cold and wet winters and hot, dry summers. Annual precipitation ranges between 400 and 150 mm, with the majority occurring between October and March.

== Valleys ==
Several valleys have their source in and flow around Muqras Mountain, including:

- Valley Ouricia

== Dams ==
- Dam Al Moan

== Ecological diversity ==
=== Trees ===
The area surrounding Muqras Mountain is characterized by a diverse range of arboreal species, with numerous trees found within the nearby forests and woodlands.

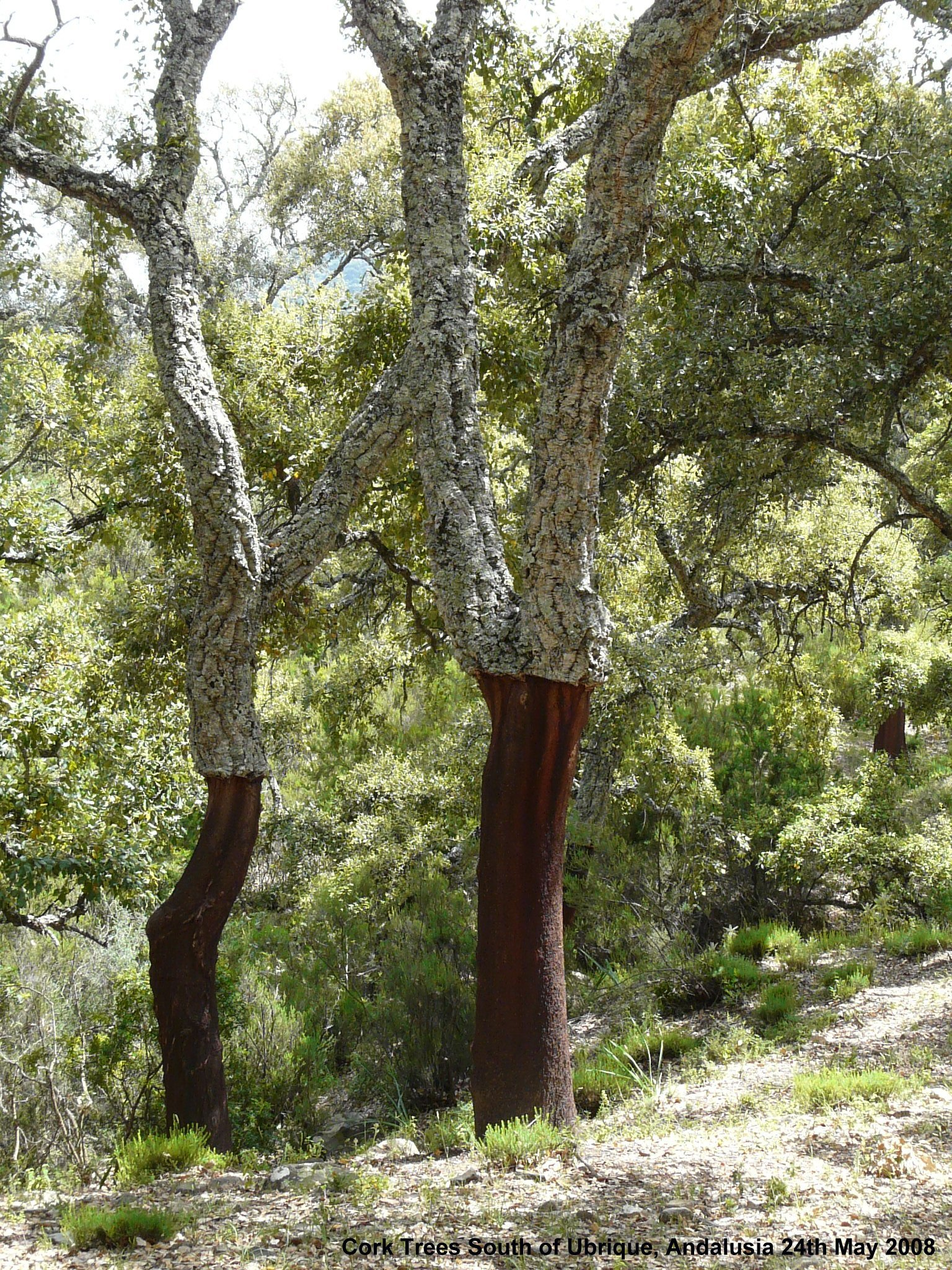
Quercus suber

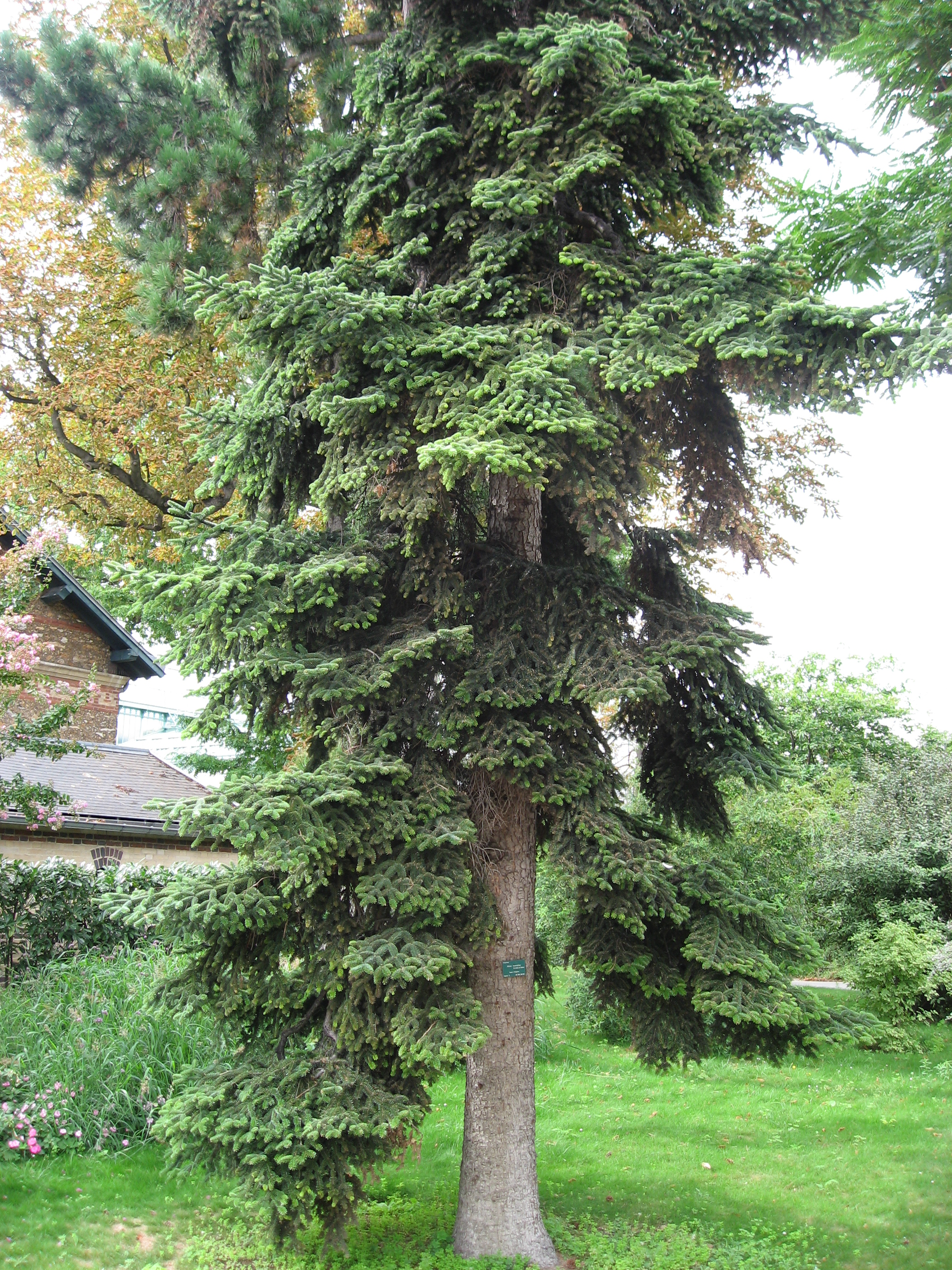
Abies numidica

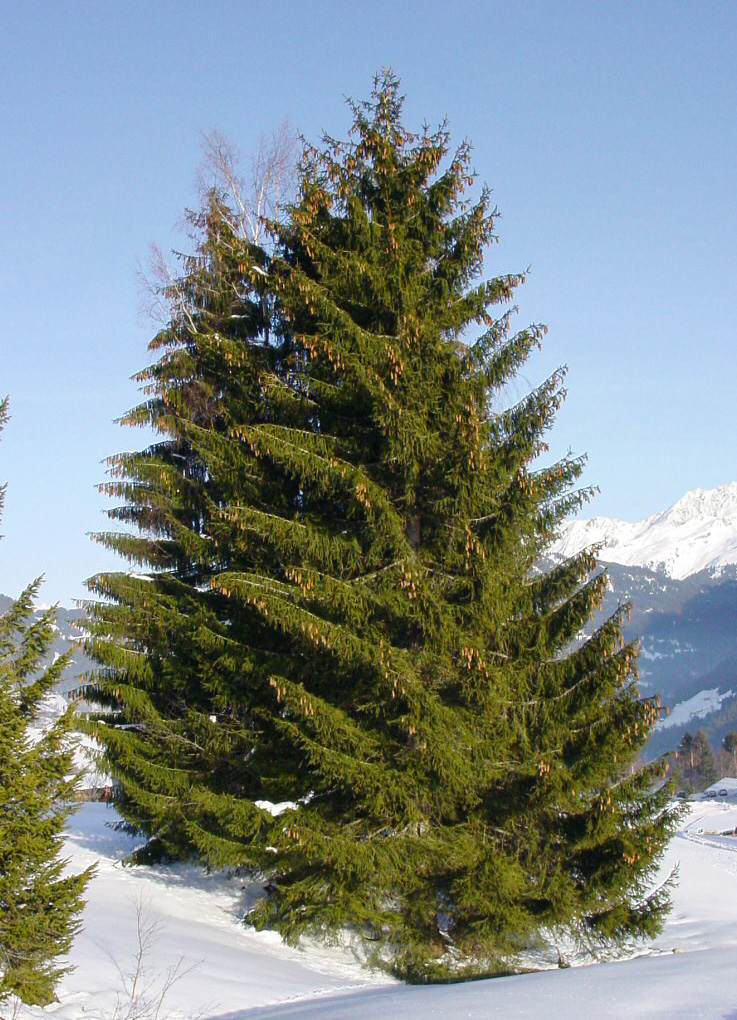
Fir

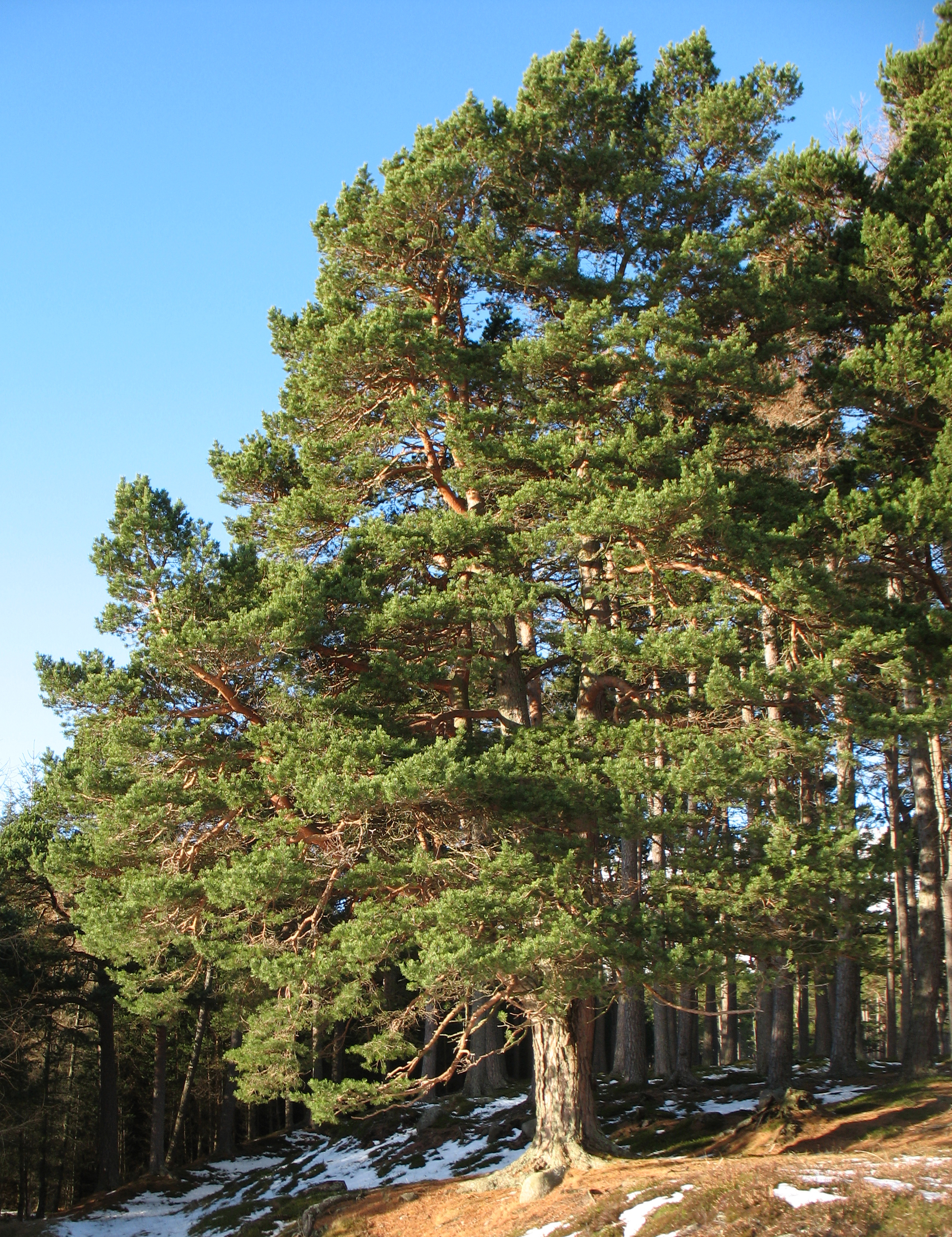
Pinus sylvestris

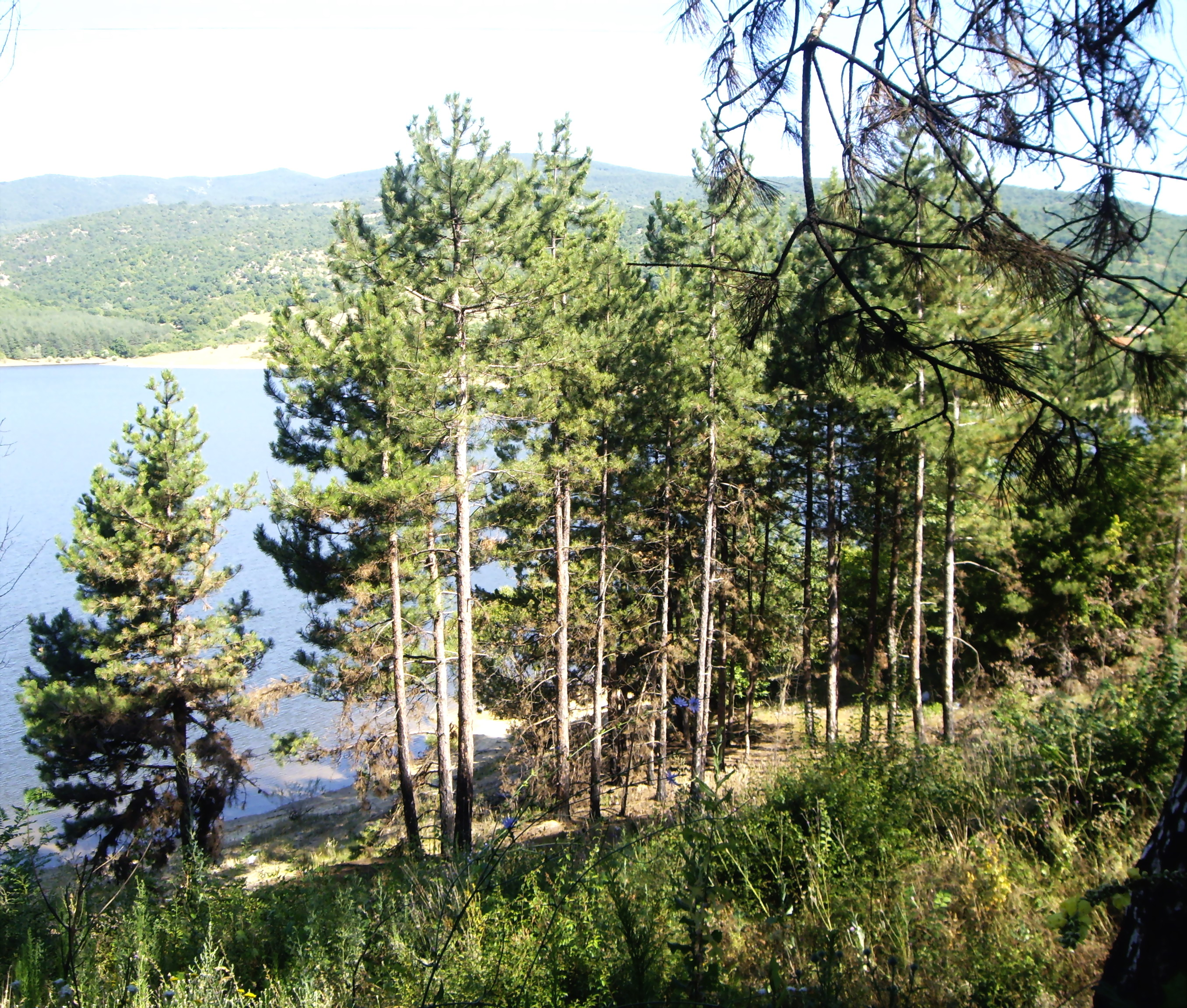
Pinus nigra

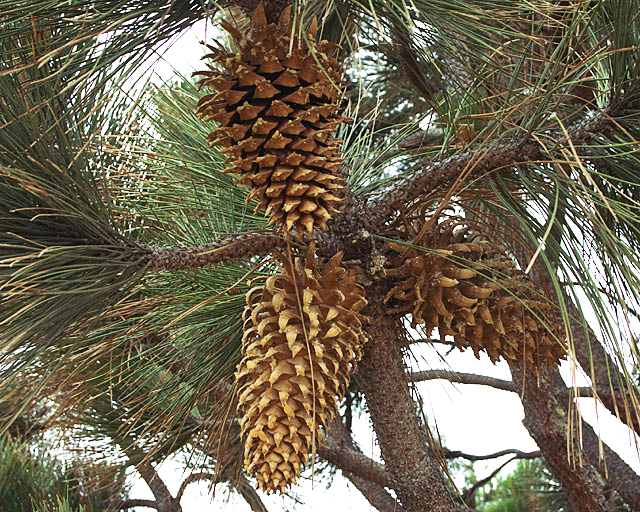
Coulter pine

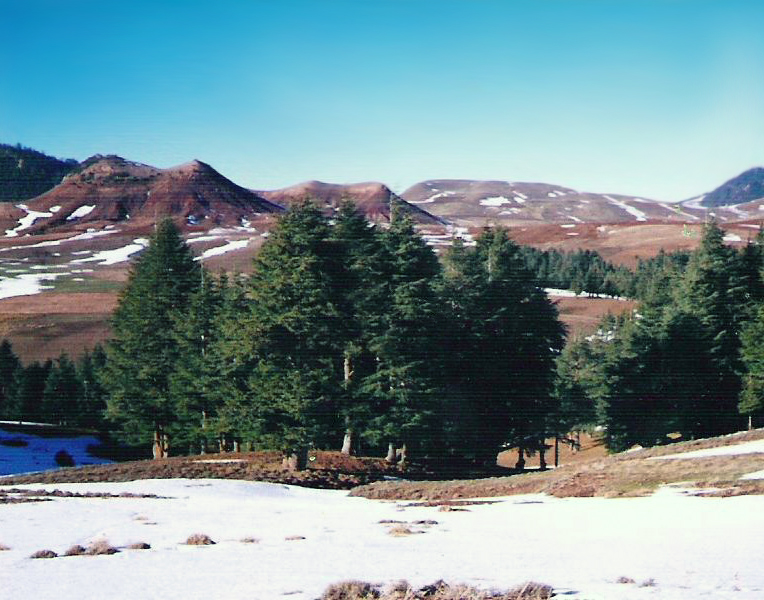
Cedrus atlantica

=== Animals ===
The mountainous regions of Algeria are home to a diverse range of mammal species, including a notable population of wild horses. These horses exhibit natural breeding behaviors and roam across expansive wilderness areas. The land is regarded as public domain, with the horses not belonging to any individual or entity.

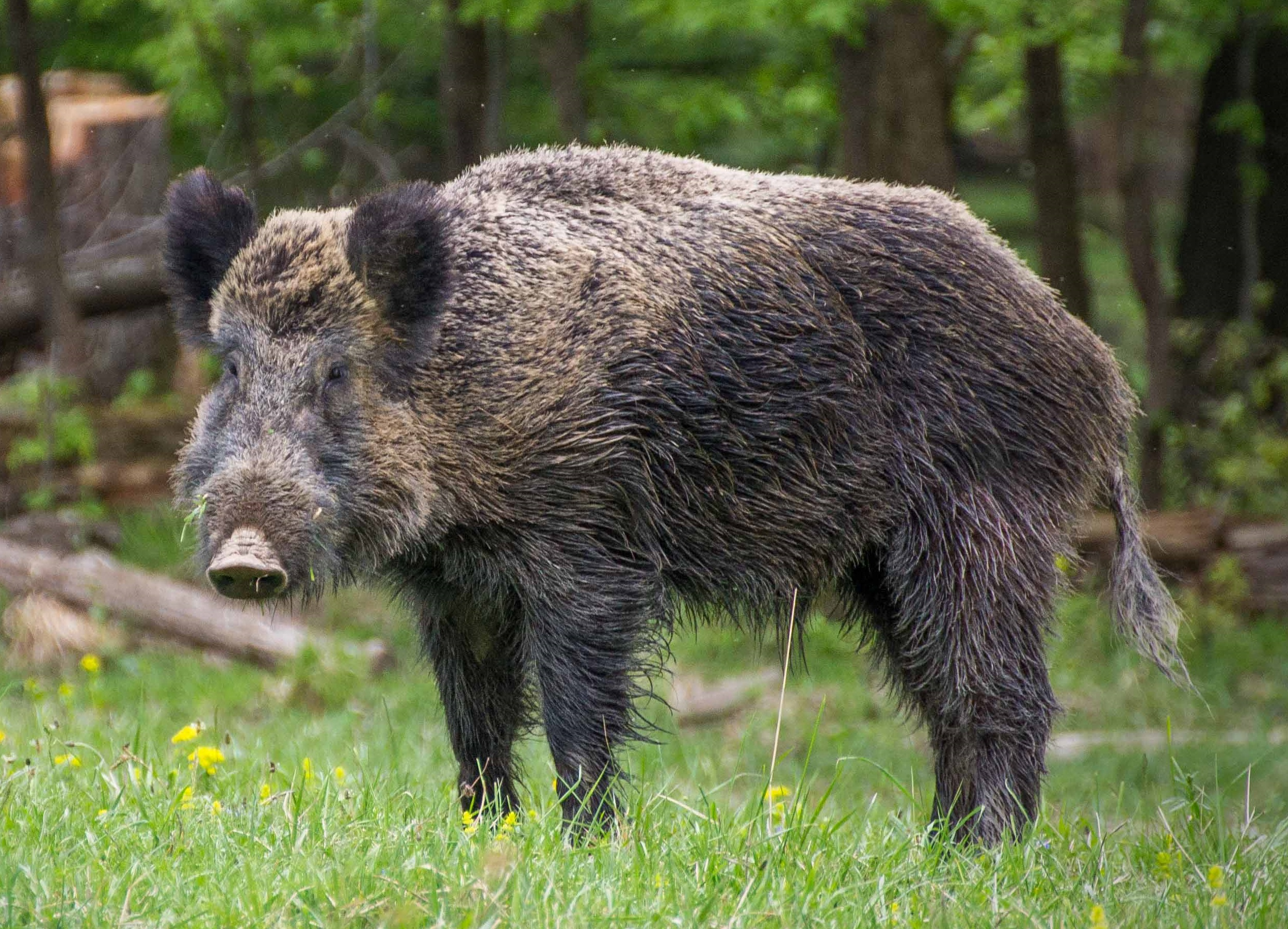
Wild boar

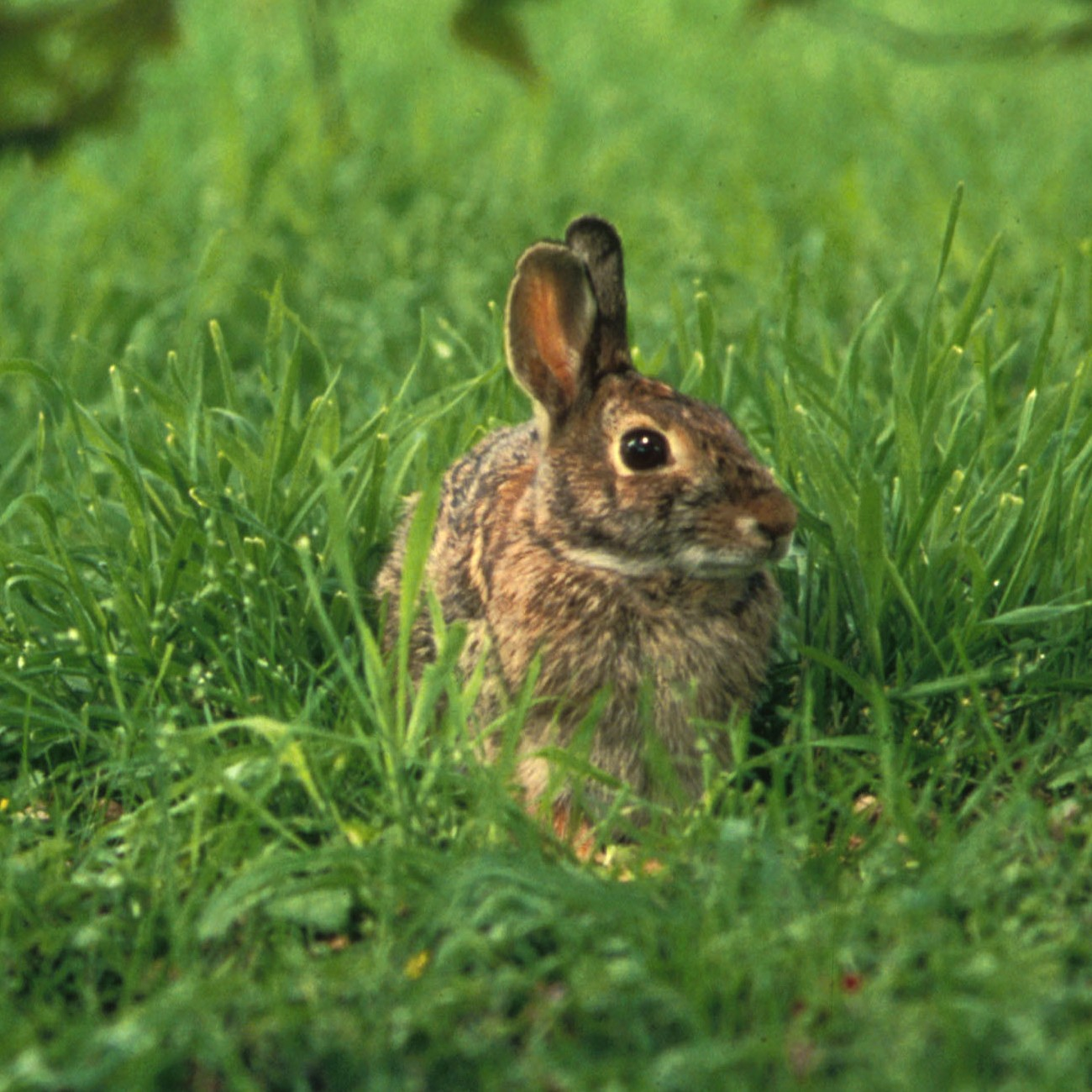
Rabbit

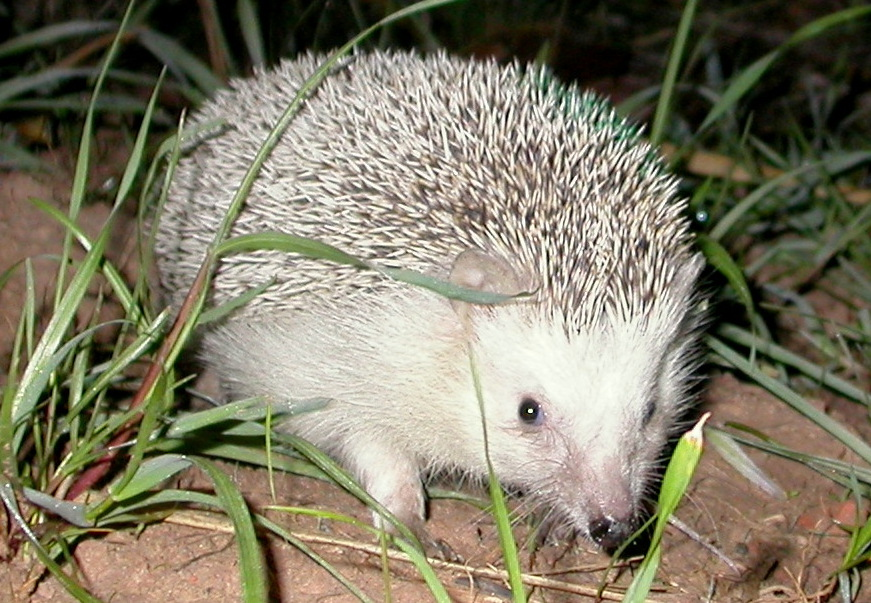
North African hedgehog

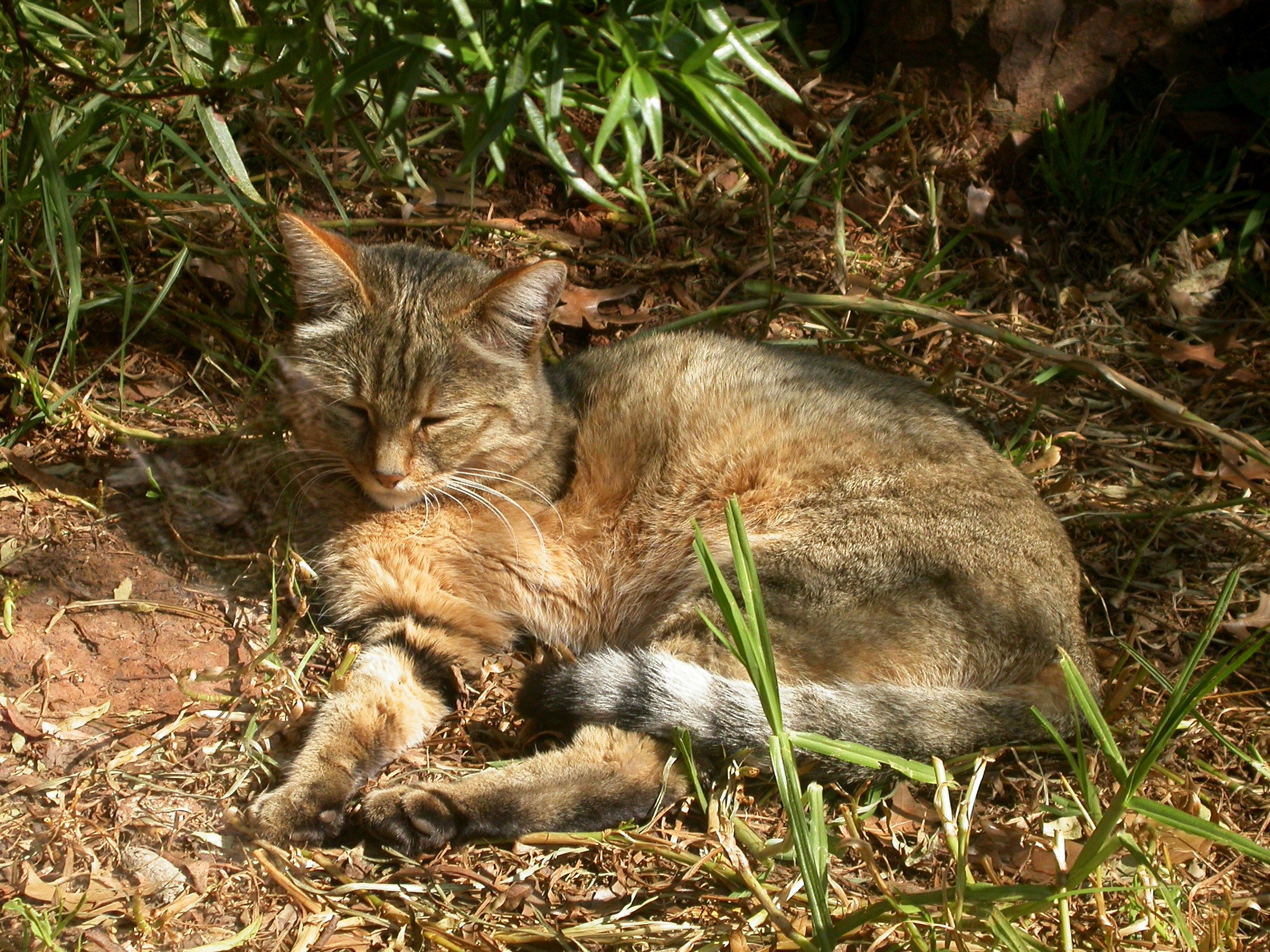
Wildcat

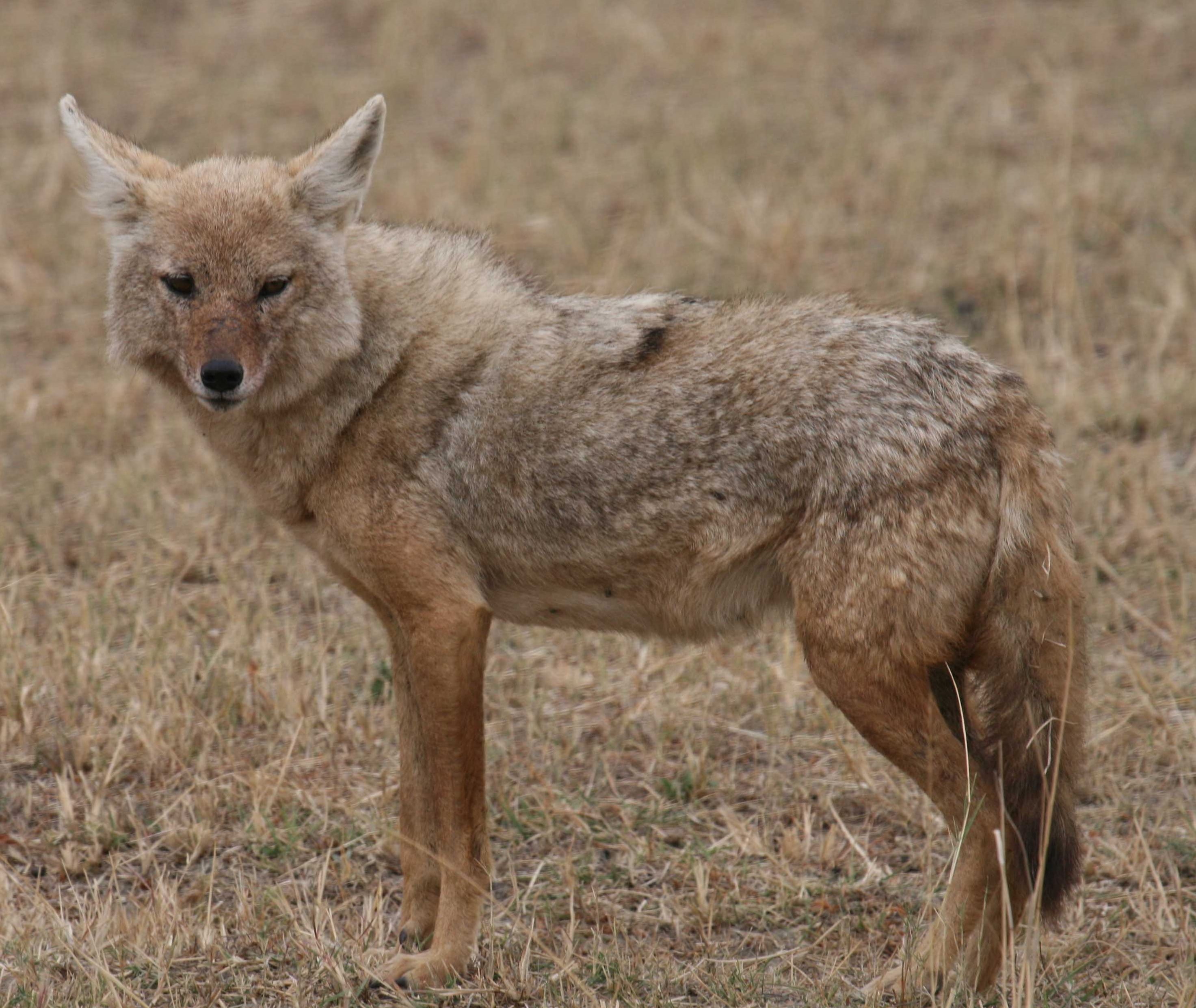
African wolf

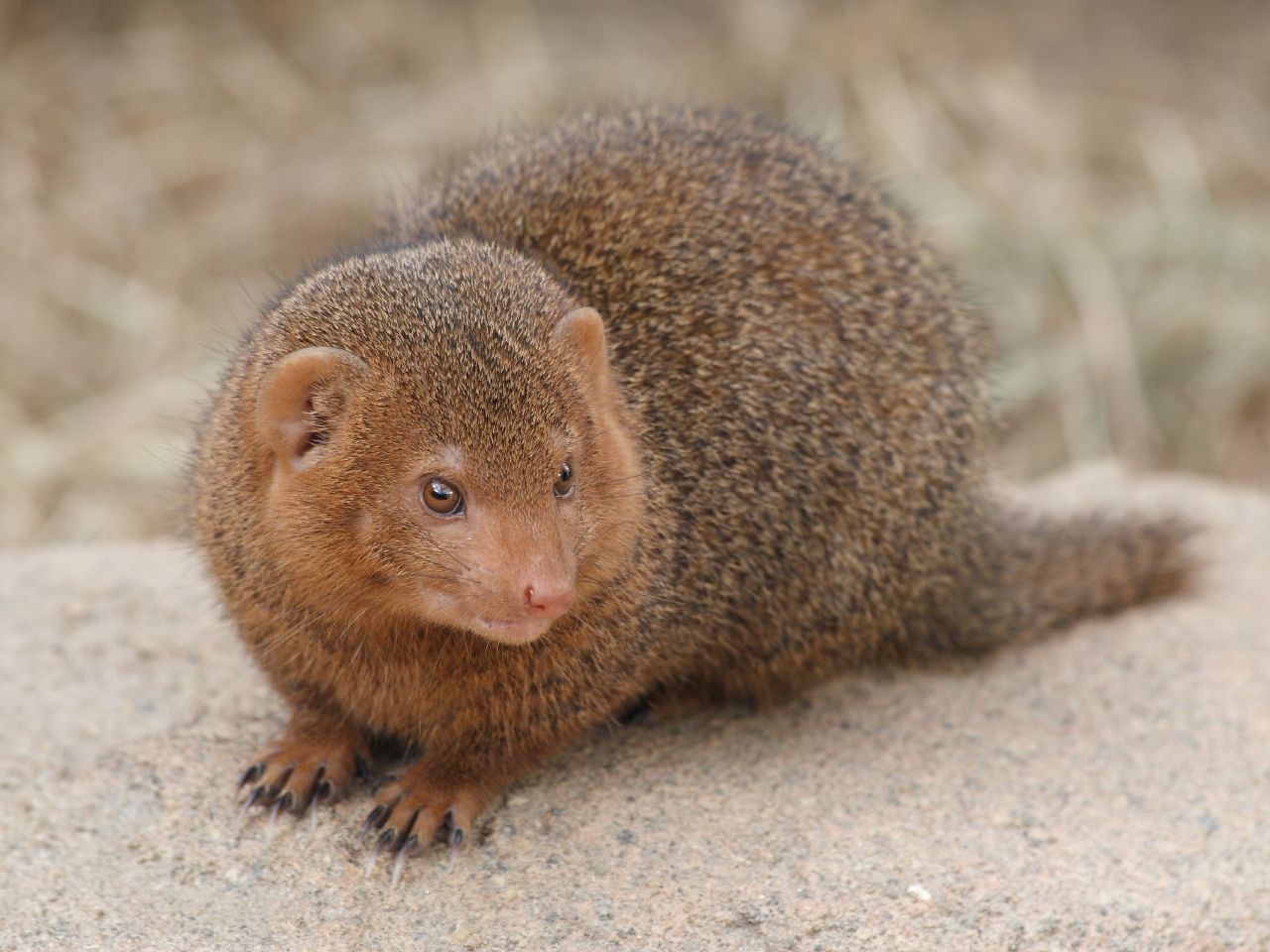
Mongoose

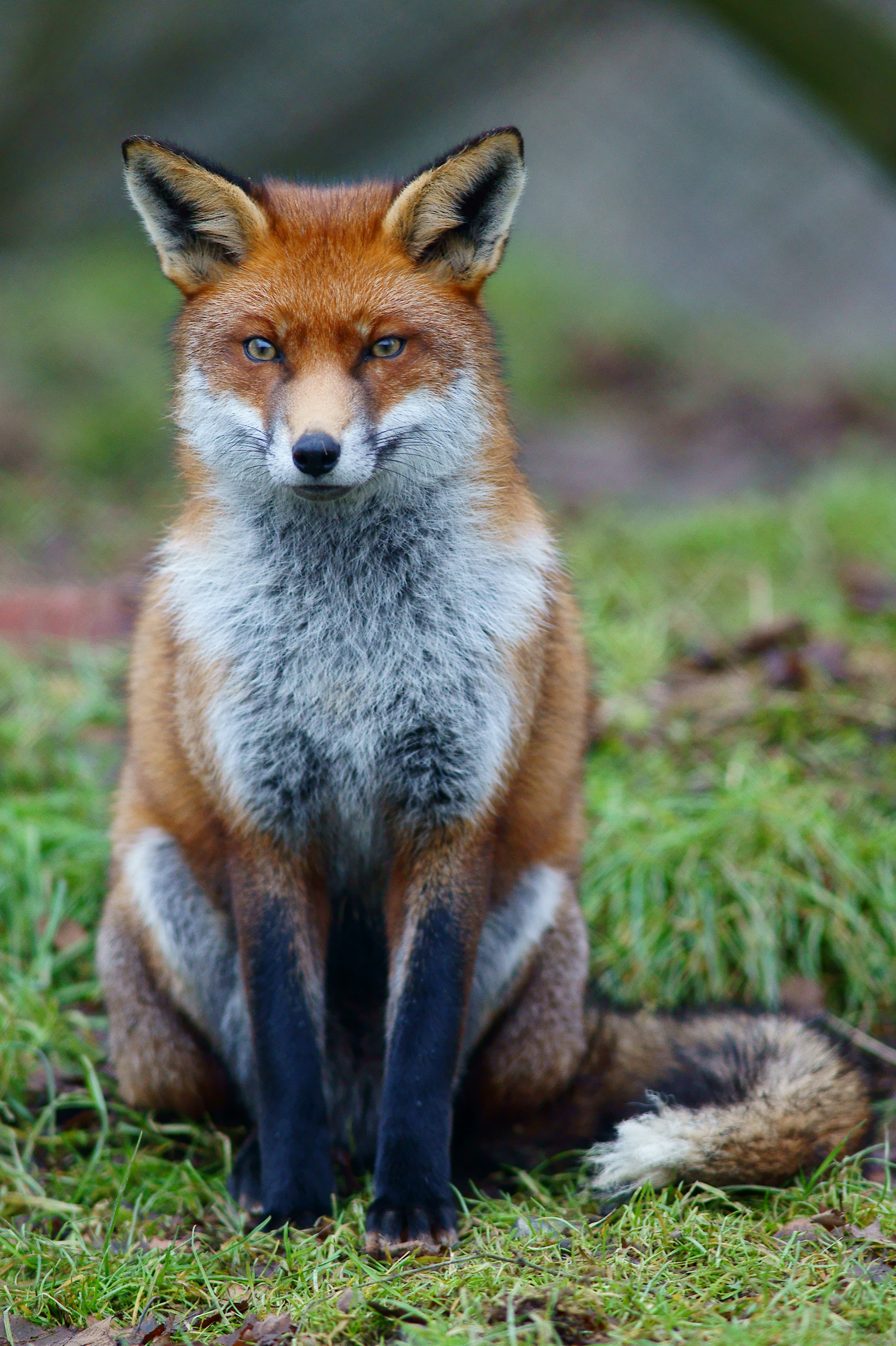
Red Fox

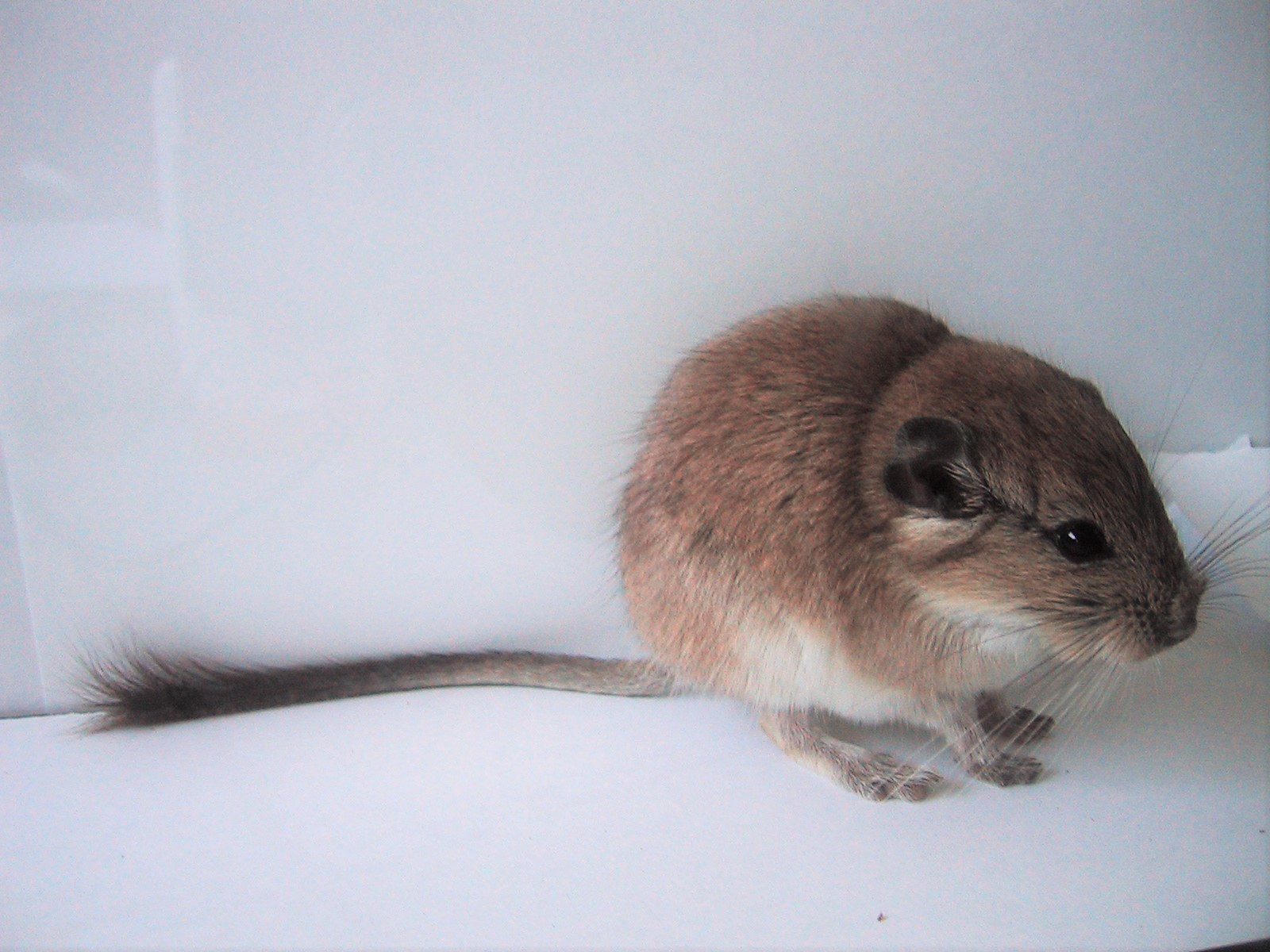
Plains viscacha rat

== See also ==
- Sabkha Zamoul
- Ben Aknoun Forest
- Reghaïa Valley
- Boudouaou Valley
- Bachdjerrah Forest
