= Barbacha District =

Coordinates: 36°34′N 4°58′E

Barbacha District Tadayra n Yiberbacen
- District

- Location within Algeria
- Country: Algeria
- Province: Béjaïa Province
- Time zone: UTC+1 (CET)

Barbacha District (Kabyle: Tadayra n Yiberbacen) is a district of Béjaïa Province, Algeria.

== Municipalities ==
The district is further divided into 2 municipalities:

- Barbacha
- Kendira
