= Anou Ifflis =

Cave in the mountains of the Kabylie in Algeria

Coordinates: 36°28′07.7″N 4°09′10.1″E

- Leopard Chasm
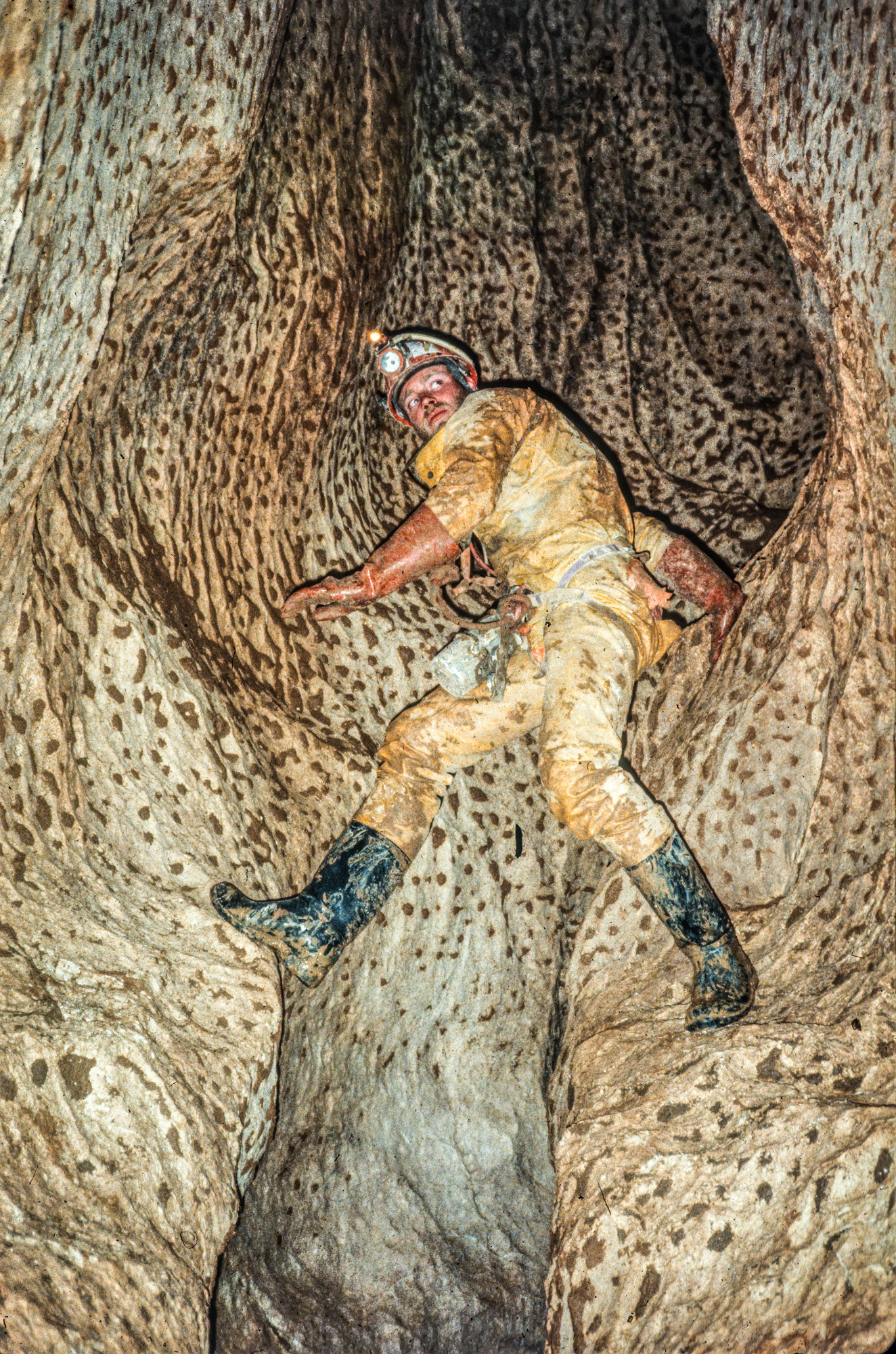
- Interactive map of Anou Ifflis
- Location: Algeria
- Depth: 1,170 m (3,840 ft)
- Length: 1,800 kilometres (1,100 mi)
- Discovery: 1980s
- Entrances: 1

The Anou Ifflis cave (French: Anou Ifflis, Anu Ifflis) is a cave located in Tizi Ouzou in the mountains of the Kabylie. It is the deepest cave in Africa at 1,170 metres (3,840 ft).

== Location ==
The entrance to the Anou Ifflis (a.k.a. D3), is located on the edge of the great depression of Ras Timédouine, oriented east–west, under the ridges of the Akouker.

== Exploration ==
The Speleological Association of Montreuil reached −87 m (−285 ft) in 1980 and −300 m (−980 ft) in 1981. The cave was explored by a French interclub expedition from Vaucluse in April 1983 to a depth of −725 m (−2,379 ft) then during the summer 1983 by both Parisians and Vauclusians to a depth of −975 m (−3,199 ft). The Espeleo Club Gràcia (Barcelona), in 1985, continued the exploration and stopped at −1,007 m (−3,304 ft). In 1986, cavers from Liège increased the depth to −1,159 m (−3,802 ft).

== Description ==
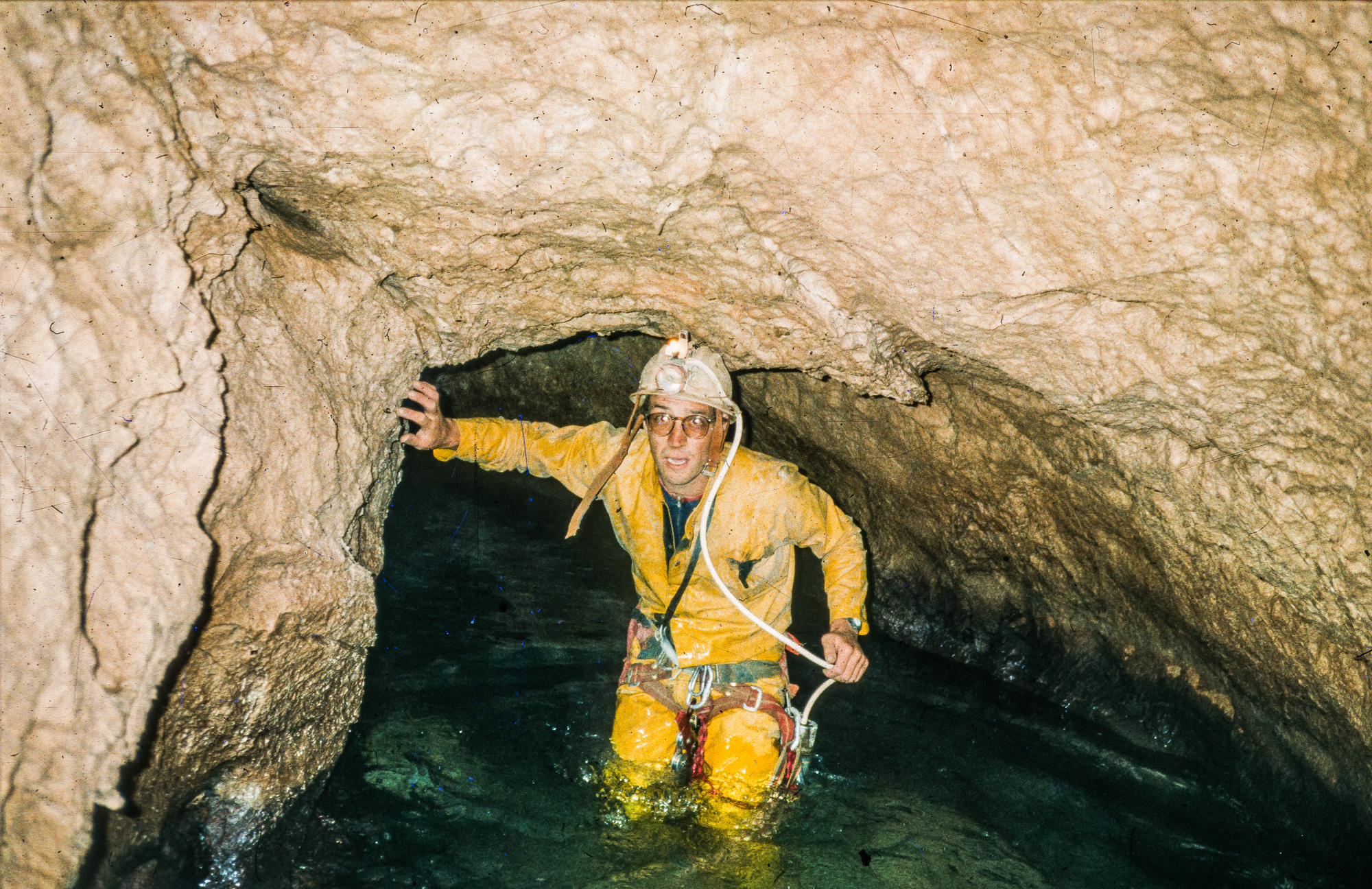
In the Emria river of the Leopard's abyss (Anou Ifflis) in Algeria, at a depth of -950 m.

The entrance opens at 2,150 m (7,050 ft) elevation as a narrow, vertical passage between boulders. After a few metres of descent, the top of a first narrow passage with a steep slope ("Le Toboggan") is reached. The first few meters of the cavity are difficult and even make you want to... turn back. At the bottom of a 90-metre-deep shaft (P90), the atmosphere becomes different, a large collapse chamber offers several possibilities for progression. This pothole is composite in nature, it combines different forms of digging depending on the depth. From 0 to -210 m, the cave resembles an inactive tectonic chasm (without perennial flow) slightly touched by flows, presenting narrows, shafts and faults. From -210 m to -975 m, the following are successively encountered:

- A meander gallery 300 m long (from -210 m to -300 m), generally well calibrated and embellished with a few vertical notches. A stream from the rivers of the Akouker ridge joins the path. - A succession of large fault pitches from -300 m to -800 m, in which the stream cascades. The morphology of the shafts is closely linked to the strong relaxation of the massif. - A streamway appears at about -920 m. The -210 m stream here encounters a significant flow of about 10 litres per second at low water which circulates in a cascading conduit. - A meander section alternates deep pools, potholes and ledges.

Finally, after a 134m Pitch and a 32m Pitch, the path ends on a sump at −1,159 m (−3,802 ft).
