= Kendira =

Coordinates: 36°31′58″N 5°03′46″E

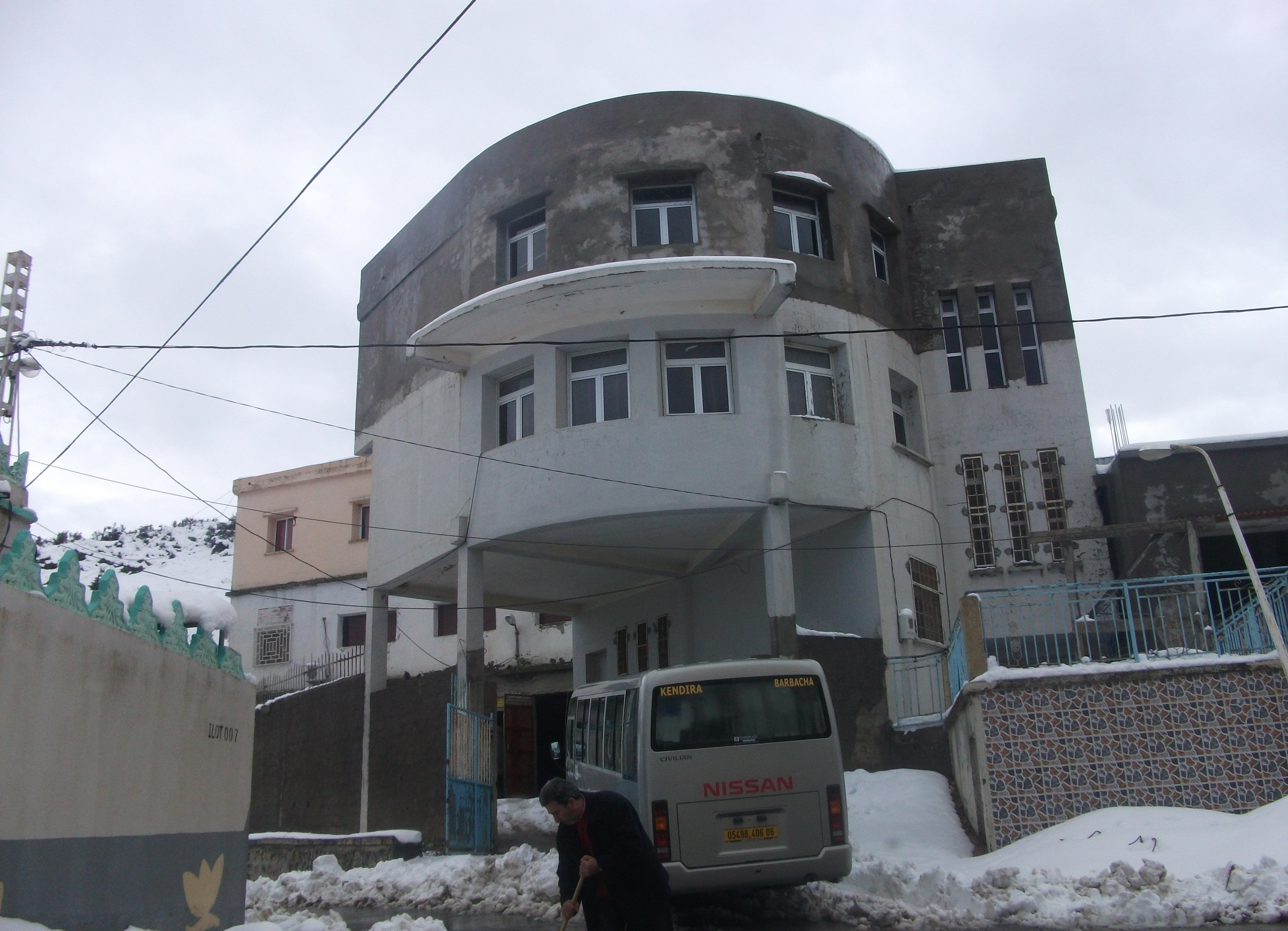

- Country: Algeria
- Province: Bejaia
- Time zone: UTC+1 (West Africa Time)

Kendira is a commune in northern Algeria in the Béjaïa Province.
