= Djurdjura =

Mountain range in Algeria

Djurdjura Range
- Adrar n Jerjer / جبال جرجرة
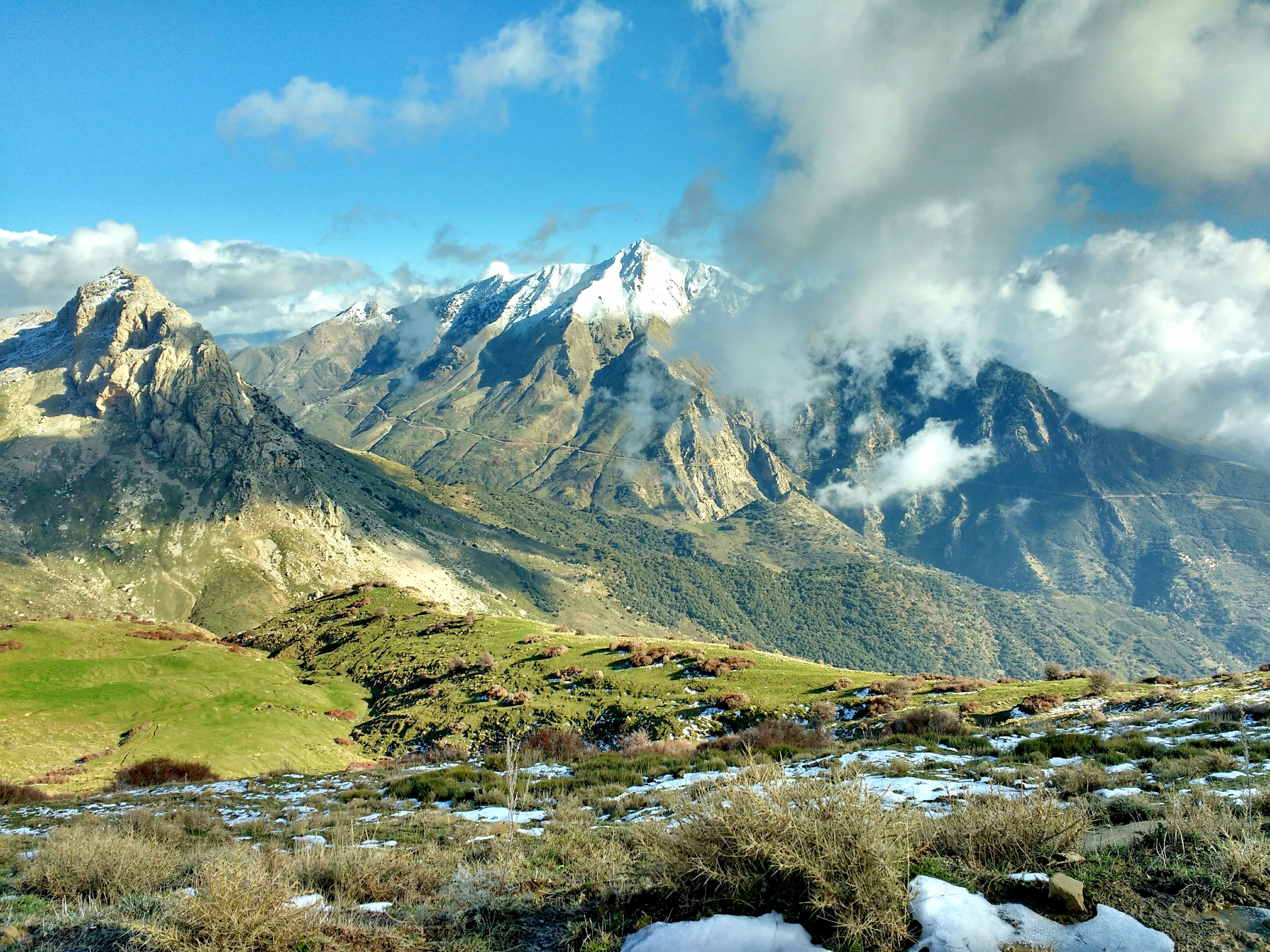

Highest point
- Peak: Lalla Khedidja (Tamgut Aâlayen)
- Elevation: 2,308 m (7,572 ft)
- Coordinates: 36°26′51″N 04°13′42″E

Geography
- Location within Algeria
- Country: Algeria
- Region: Kabylie
- Parent range: Tell Atlas

Geology
- Orogeny: Alpine orogeny
- Rock age: Early Jurassic
- Rock type: Limestone

The Djurdjura (Berber: Adrar n Jerjer, Arabic: جبال جرجرة, romanized: Jabal Jurjura) is a mountain range of the Tell Atlas, part of the Atlas Mountain System. It is located in Kabylie, Algeria.

== Geography ==
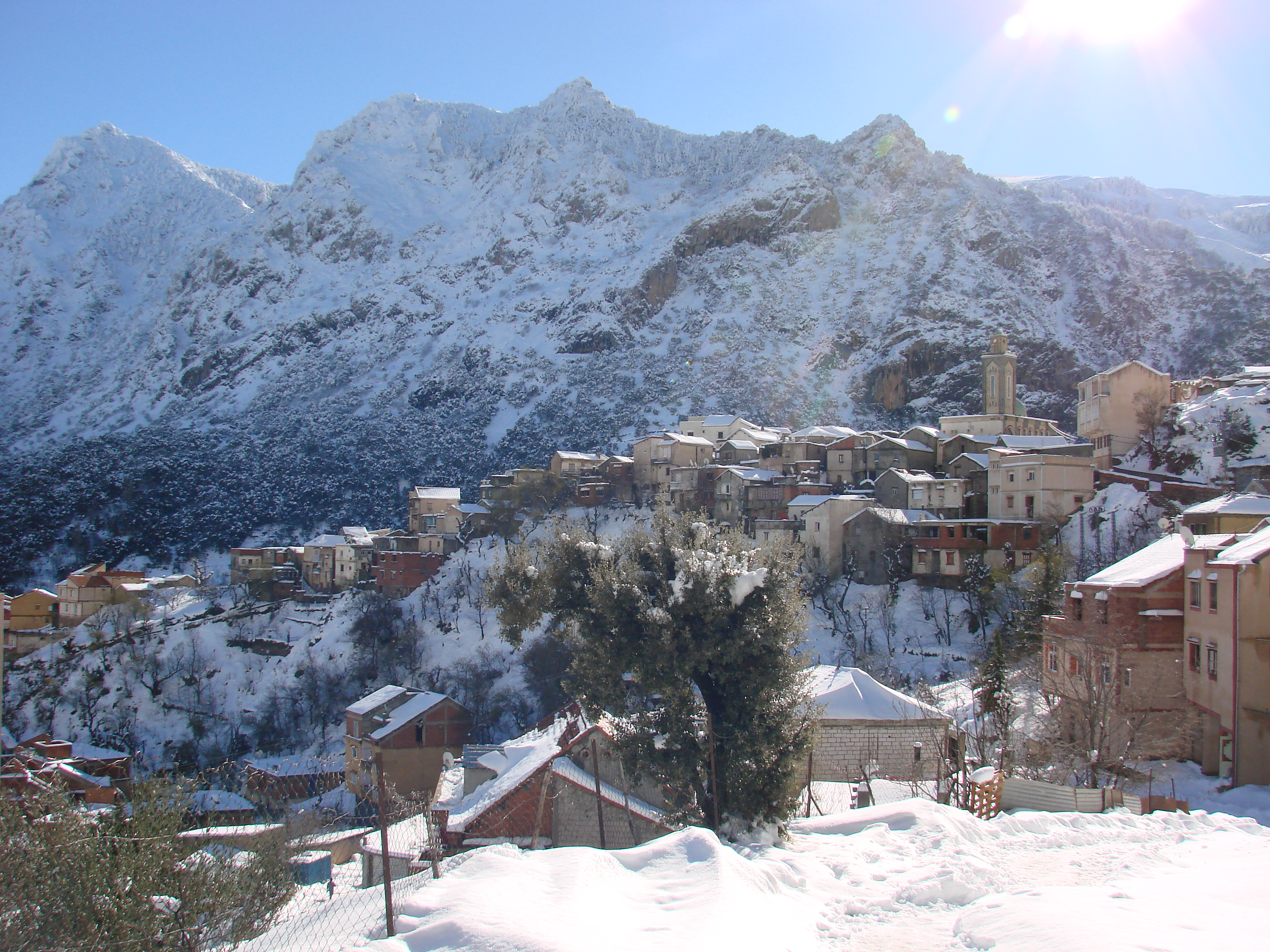
Djurjura Range with snow.

The Djurdjura is a massif made up of two differentiated ranges, one in the north with the Haïzer and Akouker subranges and the other in the south. Its highest point, Lalla Khedidja known in Kabylian as Tamgut Aâlayen, has an elevation of 2,308 metres (7,572 ft) and it is located in the southern range. Other notable summits are the 2,305 m high Ich n'Timedouine (أكارو تيمدواي), a peak located in the central area of the massif, highest point of the Akouker subrange.

Adrar n'Hayzer (أدرار نن هيدزر), the highest point of the Haïzer subrange, is a 2,164 m tall summit rising above Bouira and the high valley of Oued Dhous. The Thaletat is a 1,638 m high rocky mountain with a very original shape located in Tizi Ouzou Province.

Other notable features of the Djurdjura range are the 1,750 m high Tirourda Pass (تيروردا) mountain pass at the eastern end and the Kweryet (كويرت), a 1500 m high mountain that rises to the north of the massif. This mountain gave its name to an ancient commune, Douar N'Kweryet, a commune that gathered certain villages of the Ouacifs (At Wasif) and the Ouadhia (Iwadhiyen).

== History ==
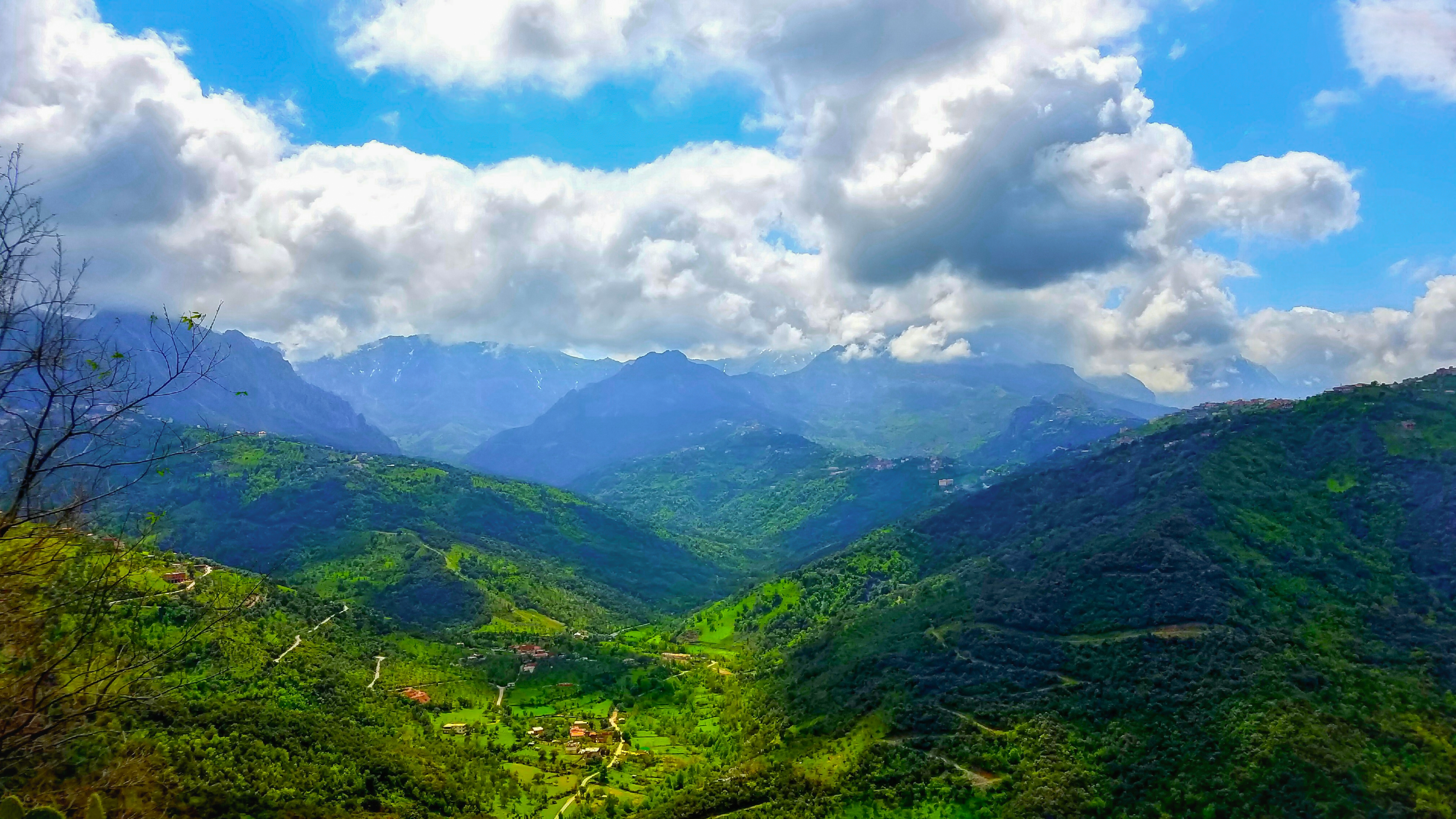
The Djurdjura during the spring.

The range had been known to the ancient Romans as Mons Ferratus, the Iron Mountains. Famous mediaeval explorer Ibn Batuta went to Béjaïa across this mountain range. He was heading towards Tunis with a caravan on his Hajj journey and traveled to Béjaïa from Mitidja, a plain near Algiers.

== Resorts and protected areas ==
The Djurdjura National Park is a protected area within the range.

This mountain range also has a ski resort (أكابور مركز تيكجدة) at Tikjda with places such as the Point De Vue Du Djurdjura, as well as the Gouffre de l’Akouker. The resort is located at a height of 1,478 m.

== See also ==
- Kabyles
- List of mountains in Algeria
- Tell Atlas
- Lake Akfadou
