= Sétif =

Setif ⵚⵟⵉⴼ
- City
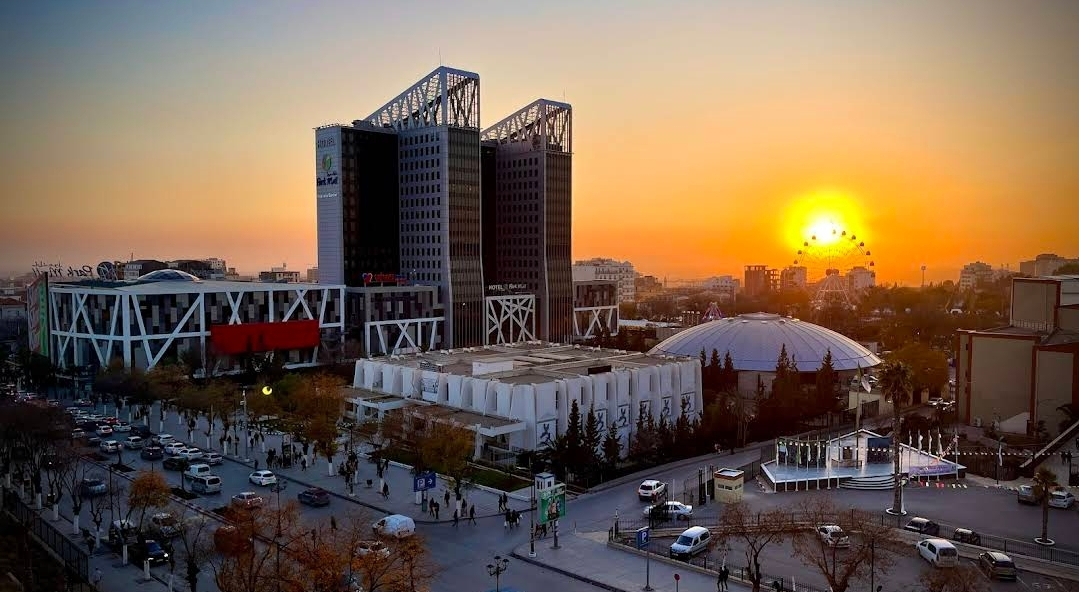
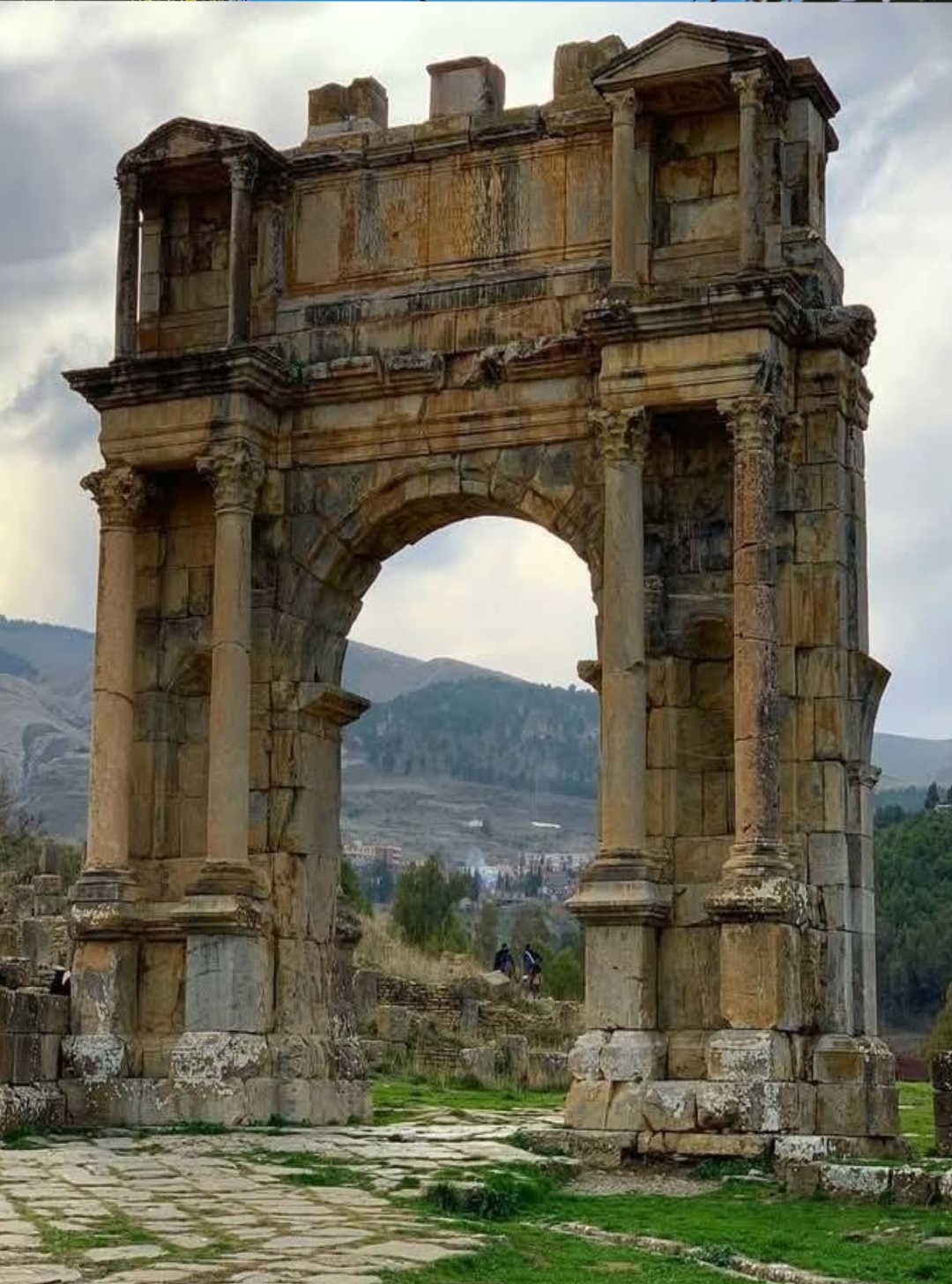
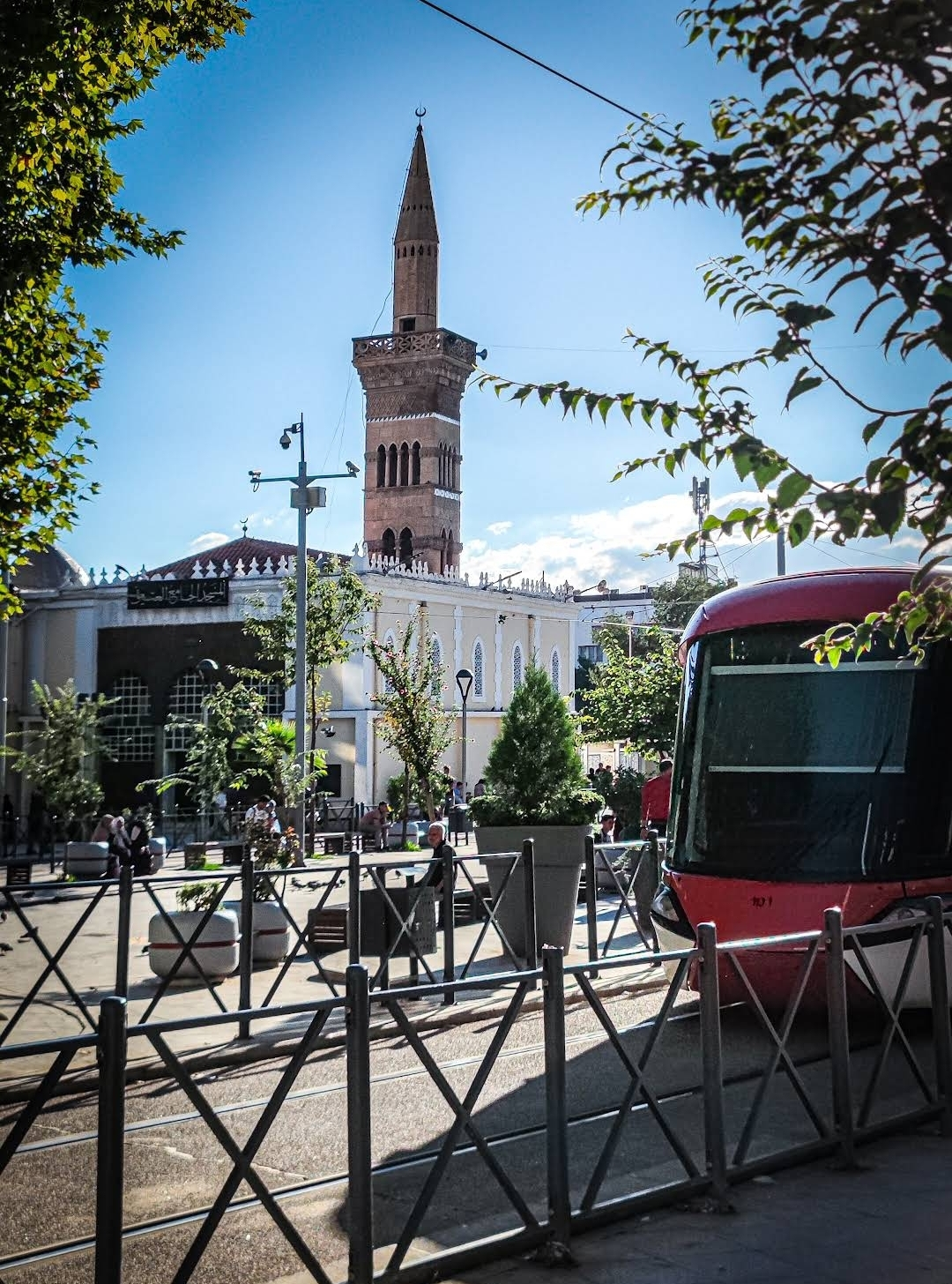
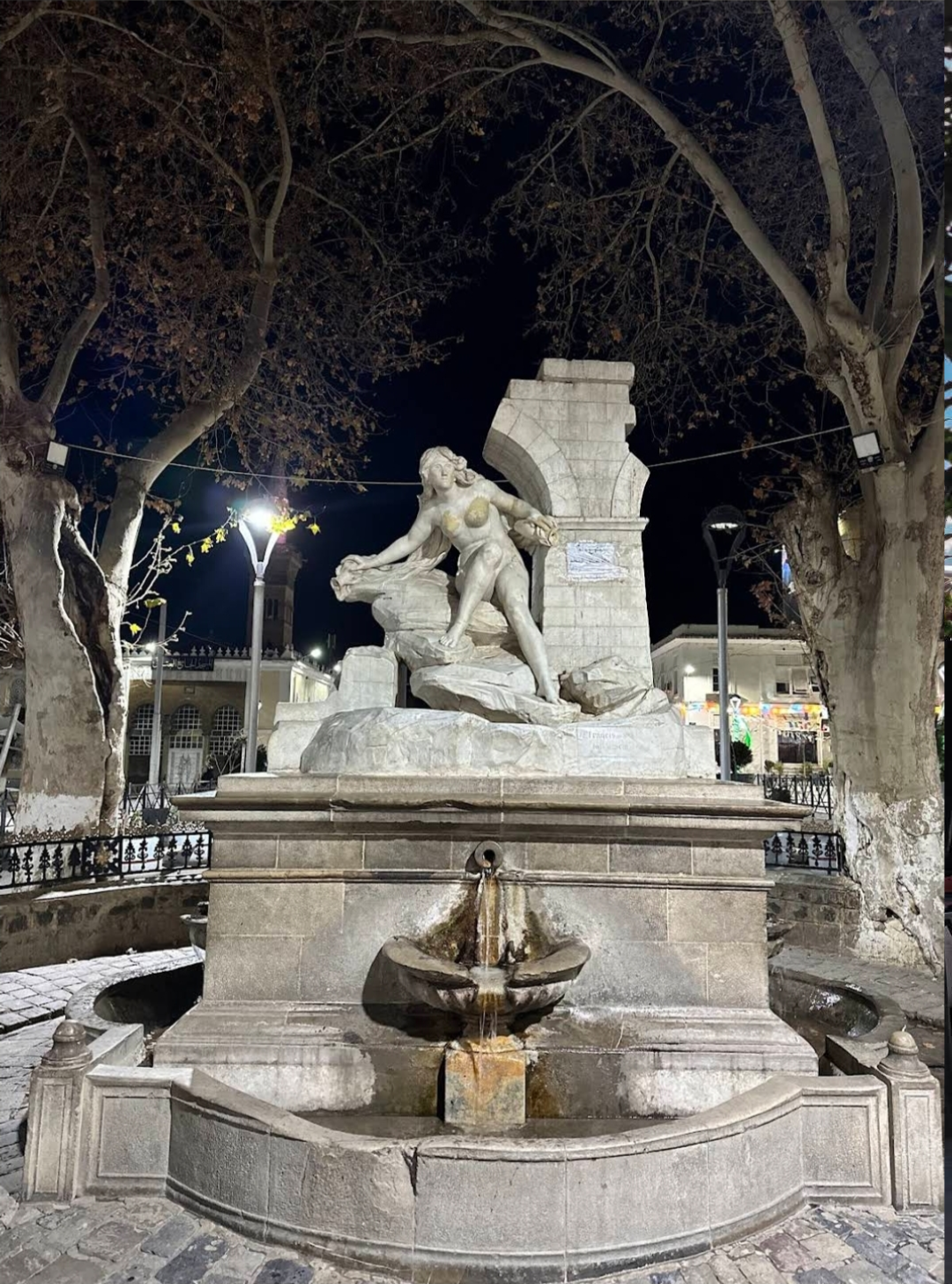
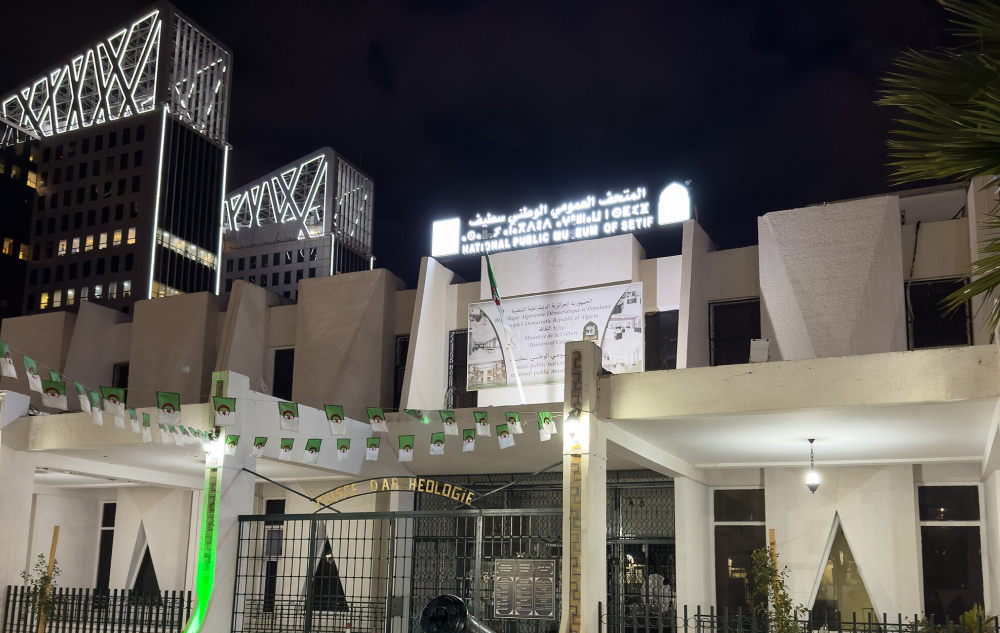
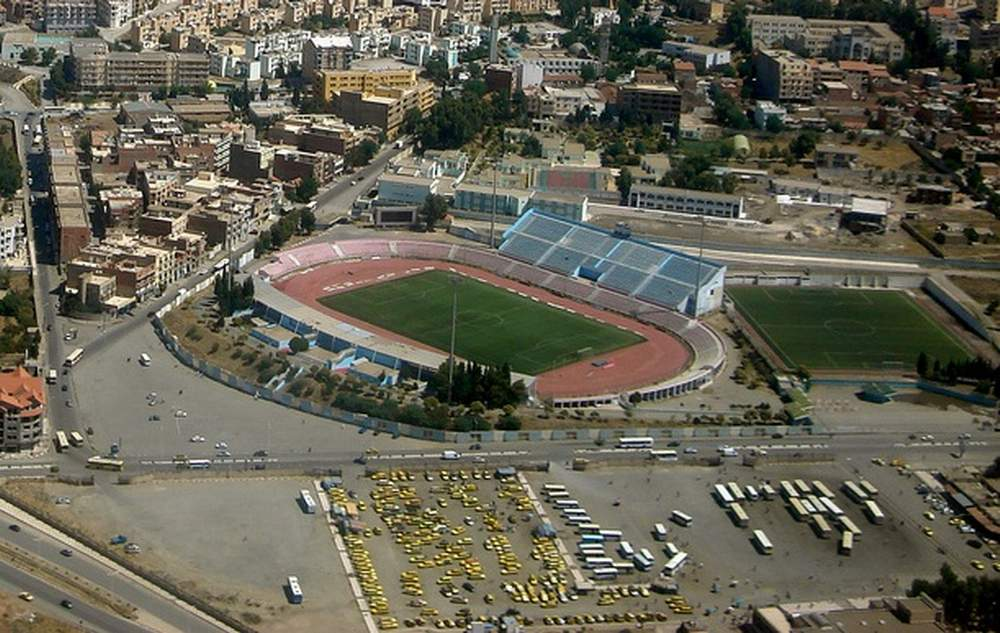
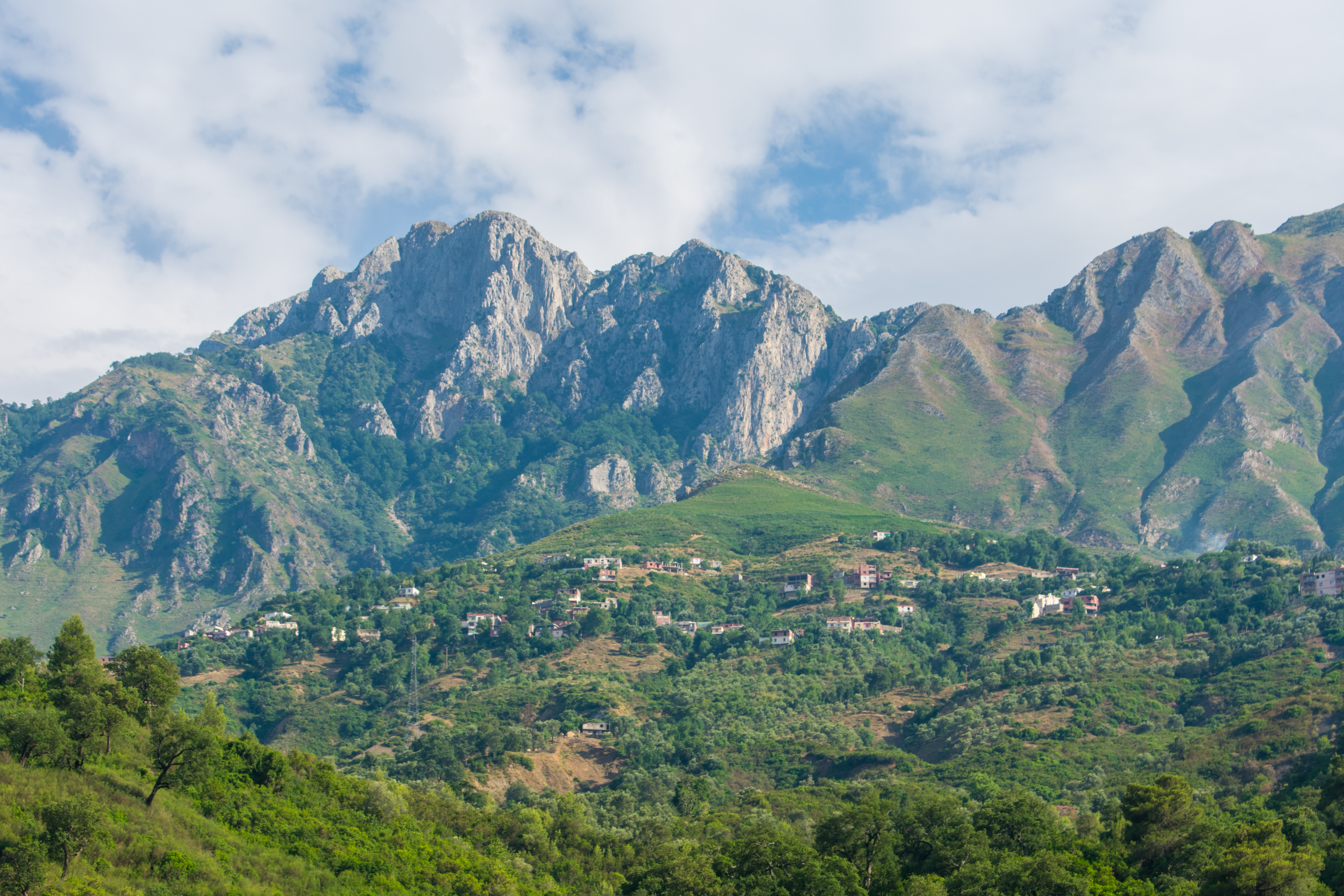
- Park Mall Sétif Djémila El Atik Mosque Ain El Fouara Fountain Sétif Archaeological Museum 8 May 1945 Stadium Babor Mountains

- Coat of arms
- Nicknames: Setif the High سطيف العالي; The Capital of High Plains عاصمة الهضاب العليا
- Location of Setif in the Setif Province

- Location in Algeria and Africa Setif (Africa)
- Coordinates: 36°11′24″N 5°24′36″E
- Country: Algeria
- Province: Sétif Province
- District: Sétif District

Government
  - Body: People's Municipal Assembly
  - Mayor: Mohamed Cherif Bourmani

Area
  - Total: 127.30 km^{2} (49.15 sq mi)
- Elevation: 1,100 m (3,600 ft)

Population (2026)
  - Total: 494 800
  - Estimate (2015): 410,000
  - Rank: 8th
  - Density: 3.88/km^{2} (10.1/sq mi)
- the official city site of sétif www.setif.com
- Demonym: Setifian
- Time zone: UTC+1 (CET)
- Postal code: 19000
- Area code: (+213) 036
- ISO 3166 code: 1901
- Website: www.setif.com

Sétif (Tamazight: Sṭif, Tifinagh: ⵚⵟⵉⴼ, Arabic: سطيف, romanized: Siṭīf) is the capital city of the Sétif Province and the 5th most populous city of Algeria, with an estimated population of 1,866,845 in 2017). It is one of the most important cities of eastern Algeria and the country as a whole, since it is considered the trade capital of the country and an industrial pole with three industrial zones within the borders of the city.

It is an inner city, situated in the eastern side of Algeria, 270 kilometers (170 mi) east of Algiers, 131 km (81 mi) west of Constantine, in the Hautes Plaines region south of Béjaia and Jijel. The city is at an altitude of 1,100 meters (3,600 ft).

The city was part of the Phoenician Empire then it became part of the ancient Berber kingdom of Numidia, the capital of Mauretania Sitifensis under the rule of the Roman Empire. It was destroyed during the Arab invasion of North Africa. In 1839 when France occupied the site, they found it in ruins apart from Roman ruins of the Byzantine fortress of Setif, and the ruined civilian housing from Roman and Byzantine periods. Reconstruction of a civilian part of the city began with the construction of a Catholic Church of Setif which is the first building established by the colonial French.

The city was the starting point of the 8 May 1945 protests and massacre, which was a crucial factor to the start of the Algerian War.

== Etymology ==
Sétif was Numidian before undergoing Roman rule. The name of Sétif comes from Latin "Sitifis", that is drawn from a Berber word "Zdif" which means "black lands" referring to the fertility of its lands.

== History ==
=== Prehistory ===
The prehistory of Setif begins with the first traces of human occupation, about 2.4 million years ago, and ends with the first Carthaginian texts, in the first millennium BC.

Aïn El Ahnech in Guelta Zerka comprises several sites that, although lacking associated human fossils, have yielded very ancient lithic remains of the Oldowan type—a tool tradition first identified at Olduvai Gorge by archaeologist Louis Leakey in the 1930s. The Aïn Boucherit site delivered in 2018 lithic industry remains (carved stone tools), dated between 1.9 and 2.4 million years ago. On November 29, 2018, the journal Science announced the dating of the site by four corroborating methods: negative geomagnetic polarity reported to the Matuyama chron, ESR dating, biochronology (fossil species assemblages) and sedimentation rate. Aïn Boucherit could be the third oldest African site after Lomekwi 3 in Kenya (3.3 Ma), and Kada Gona in Ethiopia (2.55 Ma). The prehistoric site of Ain El Ahnech is located a few kilometers east of the city, and the age of the lithic remains is estimated by archaeomagnetism to be about 2.4 million years old. It is an ancient lake, located in the commune of Guelta Zerka. The site was discovered in 1947 by the French paleoanthropologist Camille Arambourg (1885-1969), during his paleontological research of continental deposits in the Setif region. On November 29, 2018, a discovery of tools dating back 2.4 million years was published, making this site, at the time of its discovery, the cradle of Humanity before that of Tanzania. Professor Mohamed Sahnouni confirms this discovery.

=== Ancient history ===
==== Numidia ====
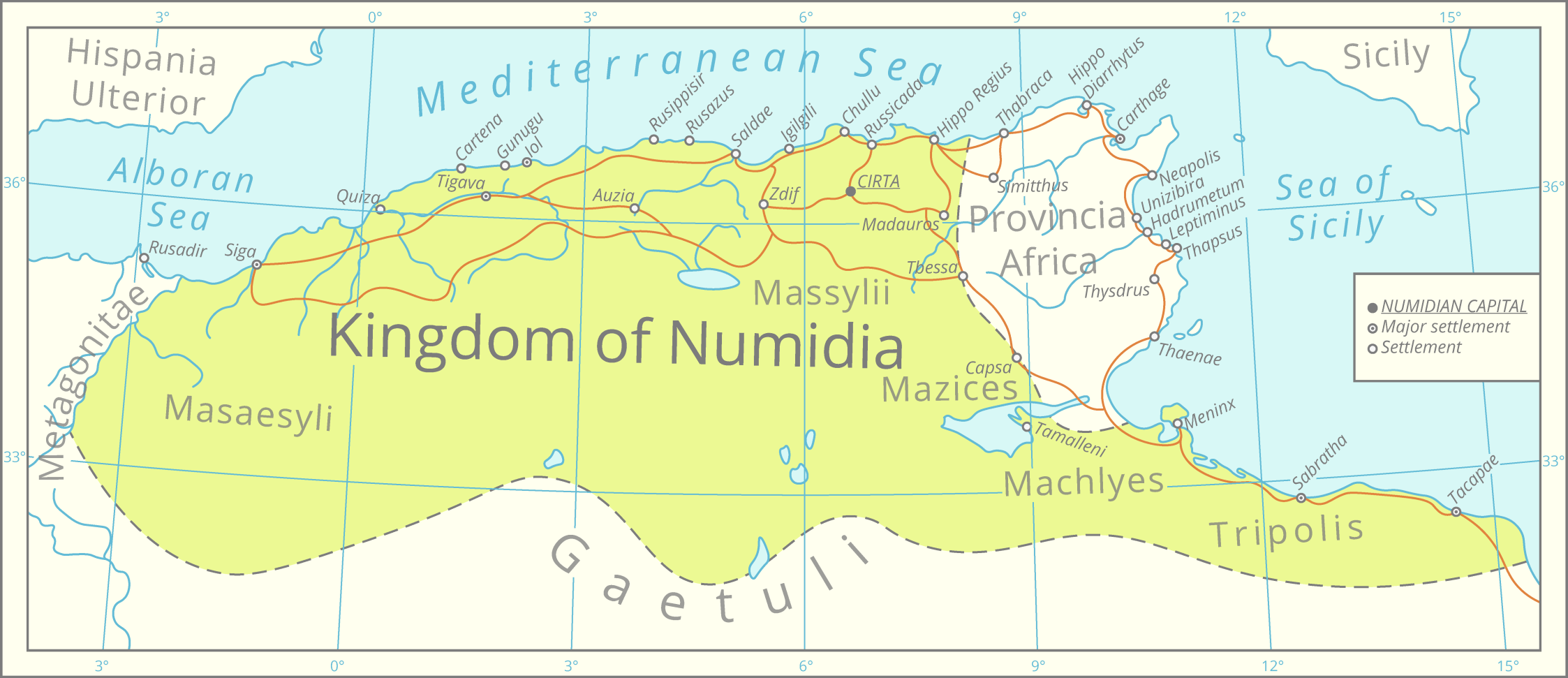
Map of the Kingdom of Numidia

The city, of Numidian origin, was part of the kingdom of Massaesyli in the year 225 BC. It was also considered as a capital before Juba II preferred Cherchell.

It was near Sétif that Jugurtha campaigned and lost against Marius in 105 BC. Overcome by Marius, he was taken to Rome where was executed in the prison of Tullianum. No remains of this period have been found. The city was small under the Numidian kings.

==== Roman Era ====
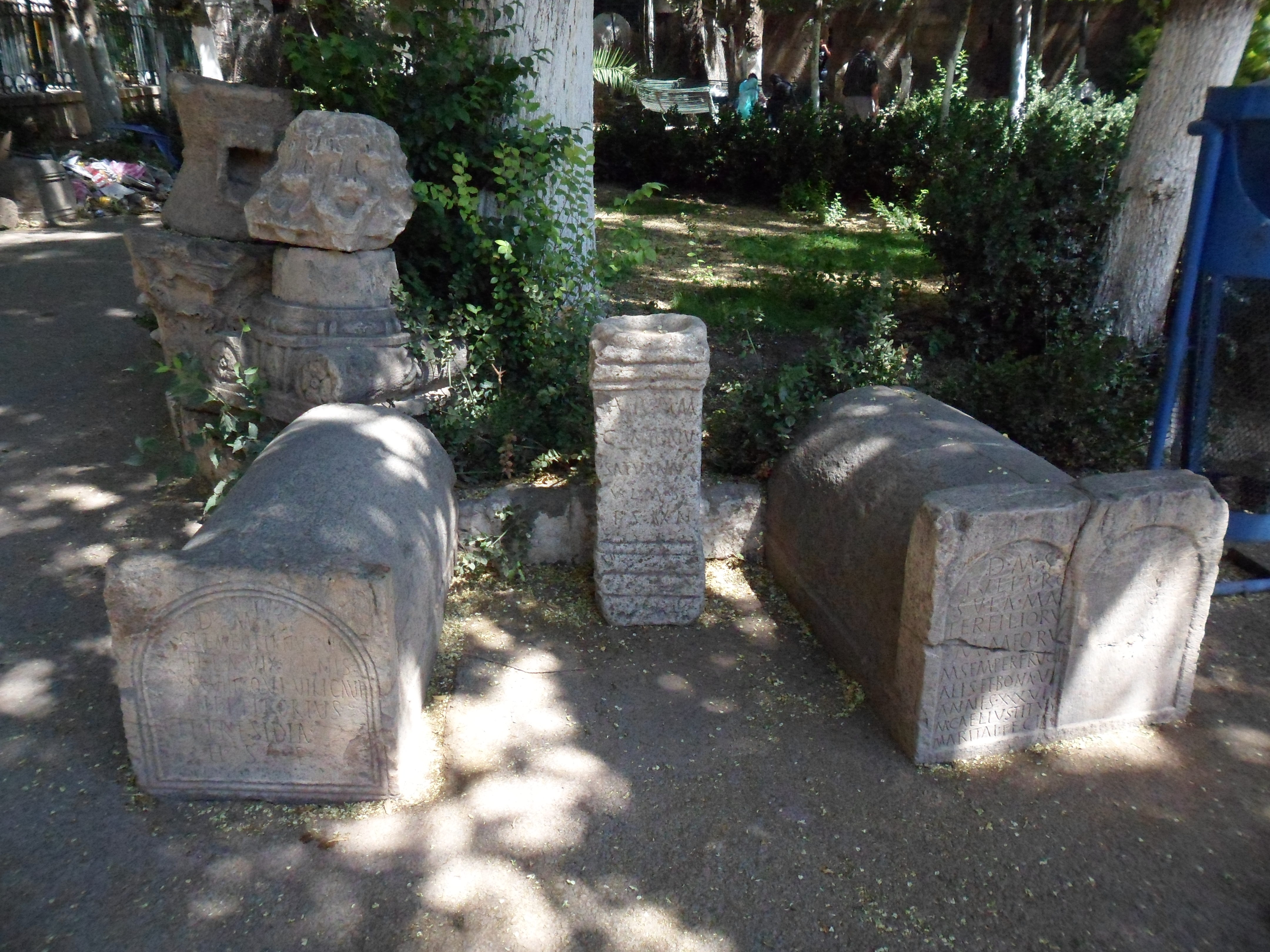
Roman ruins in El Amir garden, the city center

It was an integral part of the Roman province of Caesarian Mauritania which became Setifian Mauritania. When Jugurtha was delivered, Sitifis became part of the kingdom of Mauretania, successively attributed to Bocchus then Boccuris, Juba II and finally to Ptolemy of Mauretania, assassinated at Lugdunum at the instigation of Caligula.

For its strategic situation, Sitifis interested Nerva who installed there from 96 AD a colony for veterans the Colonia Nerviana Augusta Martialis Veteranorum Sitifensium. Although no buildings of this period are known, a cemetery excavated in the 1960s seems to have contained tombs from the early colony. Claudius reduced Mauritania into a Roman province, divided it in two, and attached Setif to the new Caesarian Mauritania, capital Caesarea (Cherchell). In 290, Setif became the capital of Mauretania Sitifensis (present-day eastern Algeria), detached from Mauretania Caesariensis. The new province was then under the diocese of Africa, itself under the prefecture of Italy.

===== Mauretania Sitifensis =====
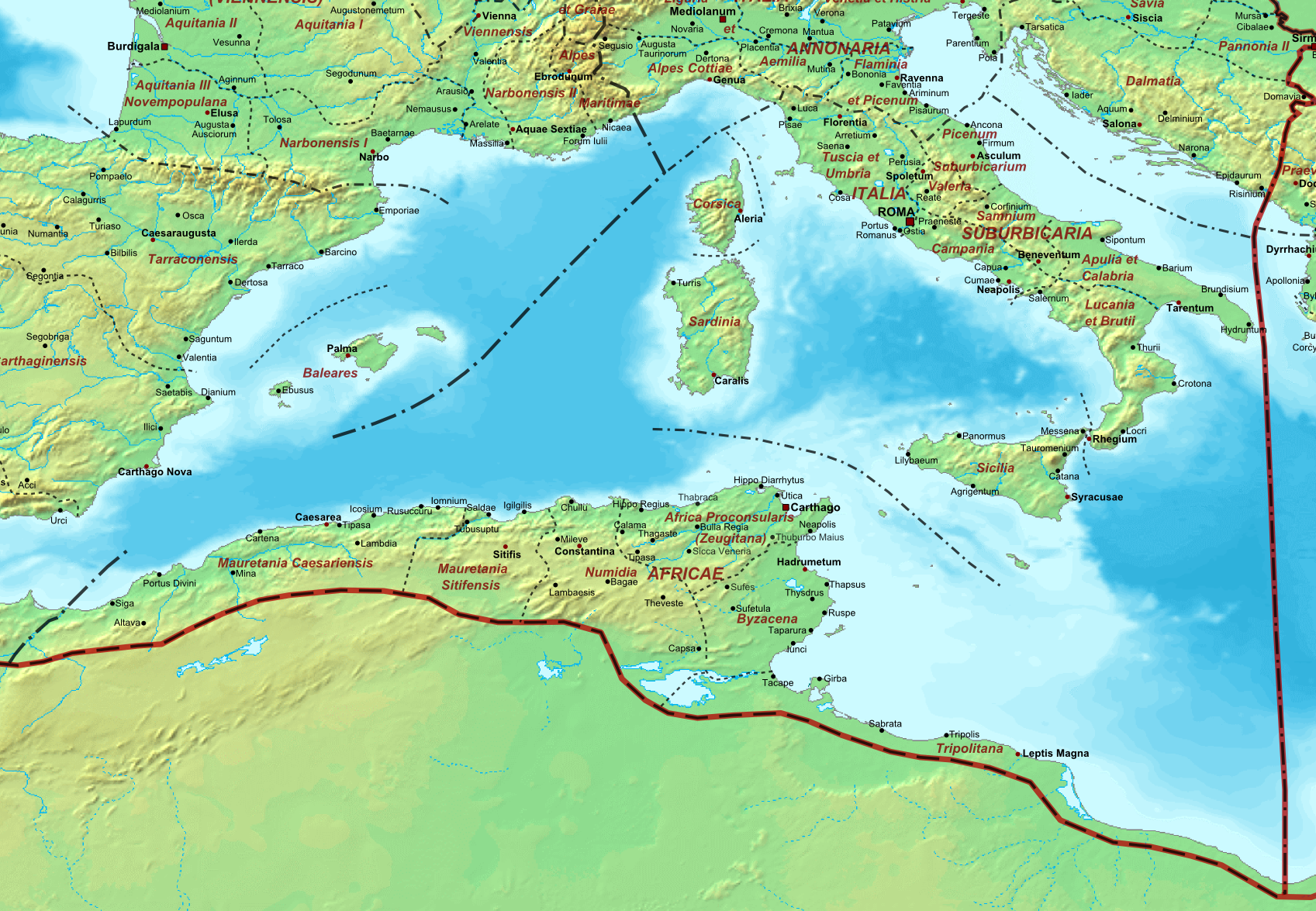
Map of the Roman Empire c. 400 AD, showing Mauretania Sitifensis

In the later division of the Roman Empire under the Emperor Diocletian, the eastern part of Mauretania Caesariensis, from Saldae to the river Ampsaga, was split into a new province, and called Mauretania Sitifensis named after the inland town of Setifis (Setif in modern Algeria).

At the time of Constantine the Great, Mauretania Sitifensis was assigned to the administrative Diocese of Africa, under the Praetorian prefecture of Italy. The new province had a huge economic development in the 4th century, until the conquest by the Vandals. In this province, the Christian denomination known as Donatism challenged the Roman Church (which was the main local religion after Constantine), while Setifis was a center of Mithraism.

After the fall of the Western Roman Empire, certain areas of Mauretania Sitifensis were under Vandal and later Byzantine control, but most of the province (until 578 AD) was ruled by Berber kingdoms like the Kingdom of Altava. Only the coastal area around Saldae and Setifis remained fully Romanized.

Byzantine emperor Maurice in 585 AD created the province of Mauretania Prima and erased the old Mauretania Sitifensis. Indeed, the emperor Maurice in that year created the office of "Exarch", which combined the supreme civil authority of a praetorian prefect and the military authority of a magister militum, and enjoyed considerable autonomy from Constantinople. Two exarchates were established, one in Italy, with seat at Ravenna (hence known as the Exarchate of Ravenna), and one in Africa, based at Carthage and including all imperial possessions in the Western Mediterranean. The first African exarch was the Patricius Gennadius: he was appointed as magister militum Africae in 578 AD, and quickly defeated the Romano-Moorish kingdom of Garmul in Mauretania extending the territory of the Mauretania Sitifensis. Among the provincial changes done by emperor Maurice, Mauretania Caesariensis and Mauretania Sitifensis were re-merged as a province of Mauretania Prima.

Mauretania Sitifensis initially had an area of 17800 square miles and had a good agriculture (cereals, etc..), that was exported through the port of Saldae. But under Byzantine control the province was reduced to only the coastal section, with one third of the original area.

In the newly prosperous town a bath building was built, decorated with fine mosaics: its restoration in the fifth century had a cold room (frigidarium) paved with a large mosaic showing the birth of Venus. On the northwest edge of the town two great Christian basilicas were built at the end of the fourth century, decorated, again, with splendid mosaics, and a Bishopric was founded at this time. There was a Jewish community in the area. The Romans built a circus at Sitifis, which aerial photographs show survived substantially intact until the 20th century; today only a small part of the curved end continues visible; the remainder has been destroyed or built over. In the 5th century it suffered from a violent earthquake.

The region of Sétif was one of the granaries of ancient Rome: Caput Saltus Horreorum (today Aïn-Zada) was its seat.

The city has preserved vestiges from the 2nd and 4th centuries: ramparts, a temple, a circus, a mausoleum known as "Scipio's", etc. The product of the archaeological excavations is preserved and exhibited in the city's Archaeological Museum, and various steles in the Abd el-Kader garden. It is to put in relation with the site of Cuicul (Djemila).

===== Bishopric =====
The city was the base of a Bishopric. Augustine, who had frequent relations with Sitifis, tells us that in his day the Bishopric had a monastery and an episcopal school. Several Christian inscriptions have been found there, one of 452 mentioning the relics of Saint Lawrence, another naming two martyrs of Sitifis, Justus and Decurius.

Known Bishops

- Servus, mentioned in a letter of St. Augustine in 409
- Novatus present at the Council of Carthage (484), and exiled by Huneric
- Optatus, at the Council of Carthage (525).
- Alexis Lemaître, M. Afr. (24 Feb 1911 Appointed – 28 July 1920
- Joanny Thévenoud, M. Afr. (8 Jul 1921 Appointed – 16 September 1949)
- André-Maurice Parenty (9 Mar 1950 Appointed – 23 November 1983)
- Armando Xavier Ochoa (23 Dec 1986 Appointed – 1 April 1996)
- Manuel Felipe Díaz Sánchez (27 Feb 1997 Appointed – 4 April 2000)
- John Choi Young-su (22 Dec 2000 Appointed – 3 February 2006)
- Broderick Soncuaco Pabillo (24 May 2006 Appointed – )

==== Vandal Era ====
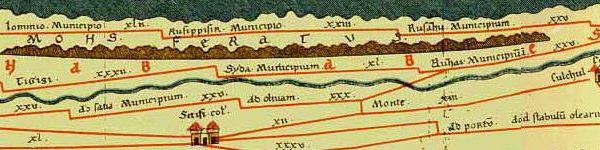
Detail of the Tabula Peutingeriana map (4th century) showing Sitifi Colonia (Sétif)

Preluding the fall of the Western Roman Empire in 476, the Germanic people of the Vandals, led by their king Genseric (427- 477), crossed from Spain to Africa in 429 at the request of the Roman governor Bonifatius, who was in revolt against the Emperor Valentinian III. The route of the Vandals in Africa, from Tingi (Tangier) to Carthage, passed through Setifis, which was probably reached in 430. Bonifatius defeated, Genseric established the seat of his kingdom in Carthage in 439, forcing the emperor to recognize him as master of Roman Africa.

Under the Vandals it was the chief town of a district called Zaba.

==== Byzantine Era ====
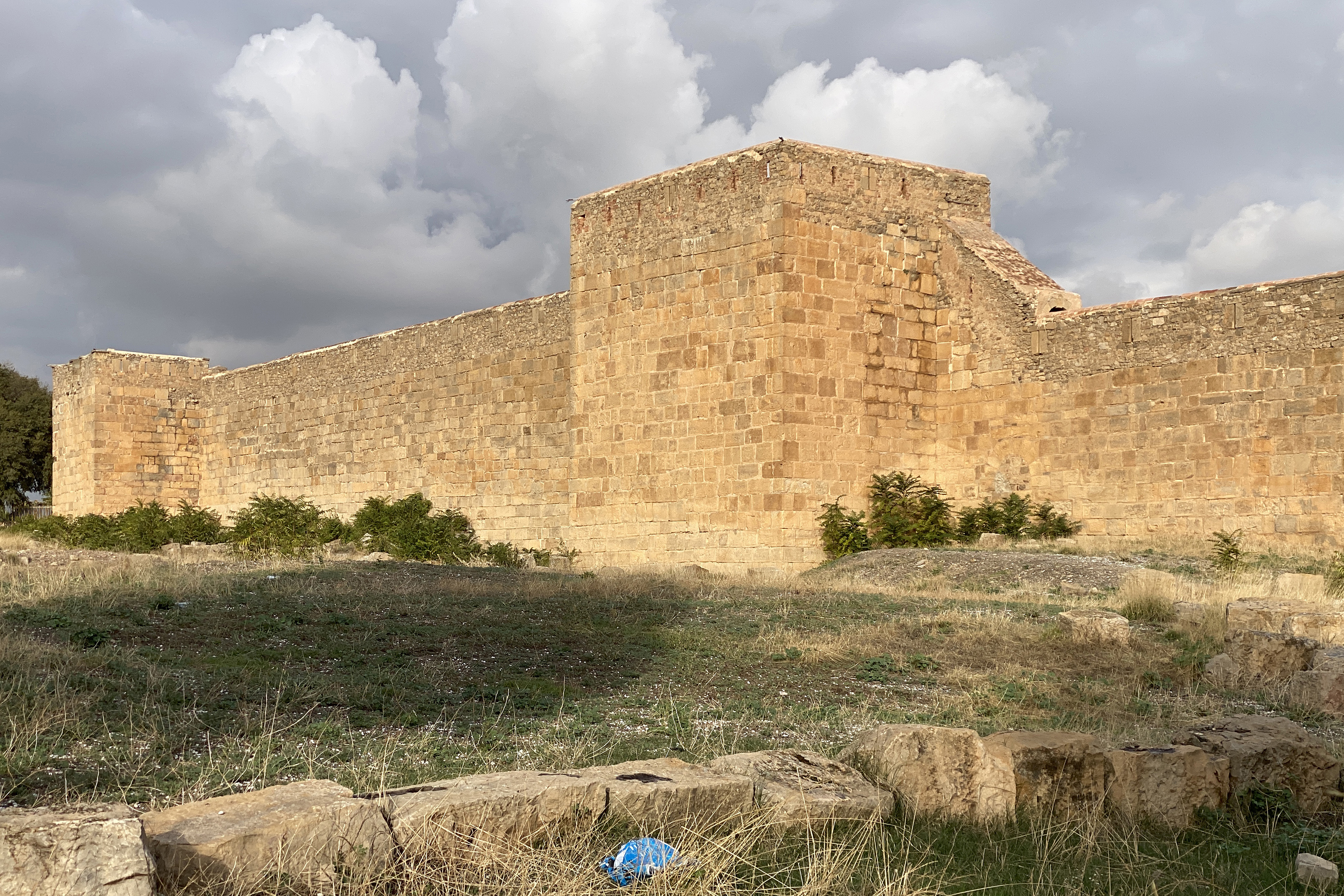
Byzantine fortress west wall

In 531, the king of the Vandals, Hilderic, was overthrown by the usurper Gelimer, giving the Roman emperor of the East Justinian, anxious to restore the Roman Empire, a pretext for intervention. After his departure from Byzantium (Constantinople / Istanbul), General Belisarius took advantage of uprisings in Tripolitania and the Moors, which enabled him to take Carthage (533) and then Gelimer himself (534).

The Byzantines found in Sitifis, a small population, because of the vandal predations. In 539, Sitifis again became the capital of a Byzantine "Roman" province: Mauritania Sitifensis. At that time, Solomon built the Byzantine fortress walls, whose west and south walls are still visible.

=== Islamic Era ===
In 647 AD (the year 27 of the Hijrah), the first Muslim expedition to Africa took place. By 700 AD, the area had been conquered and converted to the Islamic faith. We know little of the early Islamic town, but by the tenth century the area outside of the fortress was once more filled with houses: on the site of the Roman baths over twelve of these were excavated, with large courtyards surrounded by long, thin, rooms.

Setif according to the geographer and historian Al-Bakri:

"The city of Sétif is two days from El-Mecila (...) one arrives at Sétif, a large and important city, whose origin dates back to ancient times.' The wall that surrounded it was destroyed by the Ketama, followers of Abu Abd'Allah ash-Shi'i, because the Arabs had taken it away from them and had forced them to pay a tithe every time they wanted to enter it. It is now without walls, but it is nevertheless well populated and very flourishing. The bazaars are in great number, and all the commodities are in great number, Sétif is ten days from Kairouan, ten days from Gazrouna and one day from Tanaguelalt located in the neighborhood of Mila. ".

The city was successively administered by the Muslim dynasties that ruled North Africa: Umayyads, Abbasids, Aghlabids, Fatimids, Zirids, Almohads, Hafsids, Ottomans. According to the historian Al-Yaqubi in the Kitab al-Buldan, taken up by A.Duri, a fraction of the Arabs Banu Assad ibn Khuzaima called Banu Usluja originating from Iraq settled in Setif at the time of the Aghlabids with non-Arabs (Persian abna) from Khorasan.

In 903, following the death of the Aghlabid emir Ibrahim II of Ifriqiya, Sétif briefly served as the headquarters of his son Muhammad. Muhammad intended to lead a military campaign against the Isma'ili leader Abu Abdallah al-Shi'i, who had gained a following among the Kutama Berbers, but he aborted it before any battles were fought because his brother Abdallah had been murdered. Intending to seize the throne, Muhammad left Sétif for the capital of Tunis, but he was arrested in Baghaya and then executed by the new emir, Ziyadat Allah III, alongside all of Ziyadat Allah's brothers and uncles, in August 903.

This internal power struggle enabled Abu Abdallah al-Shi'i to go on the offensive and capture Sétif from the Aghlabids. He had already tried to besiege the strongly fortified city twice, but to no avail. However, in probably October or November of 904, after the city's Arab ruler died, a Berber from the Lahisa tribe surrendered the city to Abu Abdallah, who then demolished part of the fortifications to prevent them from being used against him and his Kutama allies. Then, possibly encouraged by Abu Abdallah's military success, the Isma'ili imam Abdallah al-Mahdi Billah (who would later found the Fatimid Caliphate) left Egypt to go to the Maghreb.

After conquering Cairo, the Fatimids abandoned Tunisia and parts of eastern Algeria to the local Zirids (972–1148). The invasion of Ifriqiya by the Banu Hilal, a warlike Arab tribes encouraged by the Fatimids of Egypt to seize North Africa.

It was in Sétif that the battle of Sétif took place between the Hilalian Arabs and the Almohad Berbers, which resulted in the victory of the Almohads.

Remains of this Arab-Muslim period were unearthed in the early 1980s. According to Khelifa Abderrahmane, the results of these excavations are very interesting: "The city was not totally abandoned and the remains of the baths served as occasional shelter for men and livestock. The development of the Muslim city would have taken place first to the north of the Byzantine fortress."

This excavation demonstrated that the first Islamic houses were built with reused ashlars reinforced on their inner side with pebbles bound with adobe. Carbon 14 dating refers to a period between 655 and 970. The excavation brought to light nine buildings that were dated between the year 810 (during the Aghlabid period) and 974 (during the Fatimid caliphate). A coin of the Fatimid caliph Al Mu'izz with a figurative ceramic shard was found in the third floor. According to Khelifa Abderahmane, the important thing is that the excavation was able to identify a typology of the tenth and eleventh century habitat for this region, with pieces that are longer than they are wide.19 The Arab tribe of Bani Hil'izz was the first to be found in the area.

==== Ottoman Empire ====
During the Ottoman era, the city of Sétif saw great interest from the Ottomans and experienced noticeable development. An Islamic neighborhood was found in the Sétif recreation park. The city also witnessed several major battles between the Beys of Tunis and Constantine during the rule of the Ottoman Empire.

We find that there are several Ottoman monuments in the city of Sétif, including some landmarks in the region and the Al-Atiq mosque located in the heart of the city and the Abu Zer Al-Ghafari mosque located in the city. Both of these mosques date back to the Ottoman era and, especially their minarets, still testify to the brilliance of Islamic art to this day.

In the mid-eleventh century this development stopped abruptly, and a defensive wall was built around the city. Nothing more is known of Sétif until the ruins of the town were used by the French army, who built their own fortress on the site in 1848, using the line of the medieval city wall and the Byzantine fortress.

=== French era ===
Coat of arms of Sétif during French colonization

In 1838, the city was taken by a column of the French colonial army as part of the operations to take Constantine. The occupation was initially military, but civilians (workers) soon flocked to the city. A first urban plan of the city was set up by decree in 1843 and saw the formation of a European city in 1846. The following year, on February 11, 1847, a European city was created by royal decree with an endowment of 2,509 hectares of land. From 1850, the city became a center of colonial settlement attracted by the agricultural potential of the region.

The colonization developed notably under the Second Empire, and accentuated the urban structuring of the current city center. The construction of the station of Sétif, on the Algiers-Constantine line, would have been decided by the town council in 1877.

In 1926, the city saw the launch of a social housing program for the Algerians of Sétif.

==== Massacre in Sétif (1945) ====
Map of the Setif, Guelma and Kherrata massacres in 1945

On 8 May 1945, the day of the formal end of World War II in Europe, Sétif was the starting point for a series of nationalist riots that were bloodily suppressed by the French colonial authorities. The demonstrations and the explosion of violence that accompanied them originated in a nationalist insurrection project whose aim was to create a "liberated zone" with a provisional government led by Messali Hadj. But these plans had to be abandoned after Messali's failed escape attempt from his house arrest and his transfer to Brazzaville. The Sétif riot, often presented as the consequence of popular anger caused by the death of the flag-bearer Bouzid Saâl, was in fact "a real armed insurrection that left 23 dead and 80 wounded Europeans and estimates of Algerian casualties vary widely from 2,000 to 40,000.

Map of the course of the protests of 9 May 1945 in Setif

The news of the riot quickly spread throughout the region. The demonstration of independence fighters in Sétif turned into a violent insurrection. The revolt spread to neighboring towns. The repression that followed was disproportionate and extremely brutal, killing thousands of demonstrators. This repression was carried out by the army and civilian militias. 3,700 men were deployed in the subdivision of Sétif (equivalent to two French departments). It was Governor Chataigneau who declared a state of siege. He gave full powers to General Henri Martin, head of the army in North Africa, to "restore emergency order.

France announced 103 dead Europeans and 110 wounded (84 killed, including 13 women on the first day of the riot in Setif and its surroundings); between 600 and 1,500 Algerians were killed or wounded. 400 killed and 250 wounded by the army, 200 killed by the air force, and about ten killed by the navy, but there were also 2,000 to 3,000 Muslim deaths as a result of the reaction of civilians who, from the start of the riots, organized themselves into self-defense militias. Officially, the Algerian government counted 45,000 victims, a figure put forward in the summer of 1945 by the Algerian People's Party (PPA). In 2015, French historians François Cochet, Maurice Faivre, Guy Pervillé and Roger Vétillard, reviewing recent research by a dozen French historians, estimated the number of Algerian victims at between 3,000 and 8,000 dead.

==== The Algerian War (1954–1962) ====
The events in Sétif during the Algerian War were marked by political and social unrest, as well as acts of violence and resistance against the French colonial government. The conflict that started in 1945 continued for several years, with acts of sabotage, guerrilla warfare and armed attacks being carried out by both sides. During the outbreak of the revolution, the city was marked by the following events:

- Commando operation against policeman Benton in 1956,
- Elimination of Brigadier Ferrand in 1957,
- Elimination of Dr. Kanaba, a member of the organization "the hand," in 1958,
- Clash at the train station in the Tlidjan district in 1960,
- Release of death row prisoners in 1961,
- Battle of the city market in 1962. The city of Sétif offered many martyrs including: Bouchareb Roumila / Harchi Masaouda / Zarrougui Kheira / Sebti Naima / Narwal Zouina / ... / Mohammed Kerouani / Sheikh El Aifa ...

The events in Sétif during the war reflect the broader struggle for independence and self-determination that was taking place in Setif as well as across the country.

Eventually, the war ended with Algeria gaining independence from France in 1962. The events in Sétif during the Algerian War remain a sensitive and controversial issue in the country's modern history.

== Geography ==
=== Location ===
Sétif is the capital of Sétif Province, and it has a population of 288,461 inhabitants as of the 2008 census. It is located in northeastern Algeria, 270 kilometers (170 mi) east of Algiers, 65 km (40 mi) from Bordj Bou Arreridj and 132 km (82 mi) from Constantine in the Hautes Plaines region of southern Little Kabylia. the city is located 1,096 m (3,596 ft) above sea level, making it the second-highest provincial capital in Algeria. The city of Sétif is located in the central part of the wilaya, bordered to the north by the commune of Ouricia, to the east by the commune of Ouled Saber, to the west by the communes of Mezloug and Ain Arnet, and to the south by the commune of Guedjel.

=== Topography ===
The natural structure of Sétif is characterized by its non-homogeneity due to its location between two distinct regions; the Tellian Atlas in the north and the Aures mountains in the south, with the plain region in the middle. This diversity results in a city with both a wide and elevated terrain, reaching an altitude of 1,100 meters (3,600 ft). The city also has a unique geographical position that separates the Tellian Atlas in the north and the desert chain in the south. This combination of diverse landscapes and geographical features makes the city of Sétif a unique and attractive place to live and visit.

=== Hydrography ===
The hydrography of Sétif is characterized by its wadis, or dry riverbeds, which have an irregular flow due to climatic data and precipitation patterns. The main waterways are the Boussalem and El Kébir wadis.

The hydrography of Sétif plays a crucial role in the city's water management and availability. The unpredictable flow of the wadis can make access to water resources challenging, but they also provide a source of water for both the city and surrounding agricultural lands. Effective management and conservation of these resources is necessary for sustainable development in the region.

=== Geology and relief ===
The geology of Sétif is defined by its location on the high plateaus of the Little Kabylie region in northeastern Algeria. The city is situated on sedimentary rock formations composed mainly of sandstones, marls, and limestones. These rock formations are rich in mineral resources, including iron, lead, and zinc, which have played a significant role in the economic development of the region. The geology of the area is also characterized by its high altitude, which provides a cooler climate and stunning views of the surrounding mountains and valleys. The geology and relief of Sétif work together to create a unique environment that sets it apart from other cities in the region. The diverse and varied landscape provides a rich and interesting environment, with features such as towering cliffs, rolling hills, and fertile valleys all contributing to the character of the region.

The city is located in a region that is characterized by a great diversity in its geological formations, whether in terms of age, nature, or affiliation to the geological units. This is what the geological map of the city shows, where there are three main groups:

Formations of the Rbai Era, which are divided into three types: Modern formations: Representing Tmai, granite, and limestone, which are located near the main wadis, where erosion is still active, and these deposits form a group of areas near these wadis, especially along the Boslam valley. Undefined formations: Formed from the slopes deposits of Tmai and granite and form arable land for agriculture, which spreads along the main wadis in a circular shape. Sometimes they form a group of small plateaus, the most important of which is the Fermatou plateau. Ancient formations: Representing clays from the Bechar sea and flanks of the Philakron formation, with a feature that distinguishes it by the uplift of the Setifian high plateau.

Formations of the Tertiary Era: Paleocene Formations: Representing sand, Tmai limestone and clay. It is located in the form of a wide strip in the eastern side, narrowing to the west with some northern and southern branches. These formations form the foundation on which the city of Setif is located.

Formations of the Paleozoic Era: Formations of the Permian and Lothian: Representing white clay with cracks of black silica. They are located in narrow areas to the north of the city Cambrian and Mastricht formations: Represents white clay with fragments of sandstone and black shale. They are located in limited areas in the eastern part of the city.

This geographical diversity reflects the historical, cultural and economic richness of the city of Setif and its surrounding areas, making it a unique destination for geological tourism.

=== Climate ===
Many factors are involved in determining the climate of Sétif, which are: the estimated altitude of 1,100 m, the distance of 50 km from the Mediterranean Sea, its location on the eastern Hautes Plaines and the fact that it is, of course, surrounded by mountains, the combination of these factors means that Sétif enjoys a Continental Climate with heavy Mediterranean influence (Köppen-Geiger climate classification Dsa), its summers are warm and dry, while its winters are cold and very rainy

Due to Setif's location in the highlands, it has one of the coldest winters in Algeria, it frequently sees annual snowfalls of up to 40 cm. The region records significant rainfall in winter. Flash floods are rare, but have recently occurred around spring and fall. The summer is relatively warm, where extreme heat waves are frequent around July and August, when temperatures can sometimes exceed 40 °C.

April and November are Sétif's rainiest months, in April, there are 14 rainy days while in November there are 9, however the coldest months are January and February, due to Sétif's high altitude, snowfall is very common in setif, January being the snowiest with 6 snow days.

Climate data for Sétif
Month	Jan	Feb	Mar	Apr	May	Jun	Jul	Aug	Sep	Oct	Nov	Dec	Year
Record high °C (°F)	21.5 (70.7)	21.6 (70.9)	28.0 (82.4)	29.1 (84.4)	38.4 (101.1)	41.7 (107.1)	40.4 (104.7)	40.2 (104.4)	39.0 (102.2)	33.0 (91.4)	26.4 (79.5)	21.8 (71.2)	41.7 (107.1)
Mean daily maximum °C (°F)	5.9 (42.6)	7 (45)	13 (55)	17.4 (63.3)	24.9 (76.8)	29.4 (84.9)	33.4 (92.1)	32.9 (91.2)	24.7 (76.5)	16 (61)	11.8 (53.2)	8.6 (47.5)	18.8 (65.8)
Daily mean °C (°F)	−1 (30)	1 (34)	7 (45)	13.6 (56.5)	17 (63)	26 (79)	28 (82)	29 (84)	17.9 (64.2)	12.6 (54.7)	6 (43)	3 (37)	13.3 (56.0)
Mean daily minimum °C (°F)	−4 (25)	−3 (27)	2 (36)	5.8 (42.4)	13 (55)	15.3 (59.5)	18.7 (65.7)	18.9 (66.0)	14.4 (57.9)	8 (46)	4.2 (39.6)	−2 (28)	7.6 (45.7)
Record low °C (°F)	−10.5 (13.1)	−8.3 (17.1)	−5.5 (22.1)	−4.5 (23.9)	−1.3 (29.7)	1.1 (34.0)	8.0 (46.4)	8.0 (46.4)	4.5 (40.1)	0.6 (33.1)	−5.5 (22.1)	−8.7 (16.3)	−10.5 (13.1)
Average precipitation mm (inches)	58 (2.3)	61 (2.4)	100 (3.9)	52.4 (2.06)	43 (1.7)	28 (1.1)	19 (0.7)	11.4 (0.45)	51.3 (2.02)	50.8 (2.00)	96 (3.8)	56 (2.2)	626.9 (24.63)
Average rainy days (≥ 1 mm)	8	8	14	4	4	2	1	1	3	6	9	9	69
Average snowy days (≥ 1 cm)	6	4	3	1	0	0	0	0	0	0	1	3	18
Source: Meoweather

=== Vegetation ===
The vegetation coverage of Sétif is characterized by a low percentage of the minimum ecological balance, estimated at 25% of the total area of the wilaya. Forests make up a significant portion of the vegetation, representing 66.15% of the total area of the wilaya, including 62,750 hectares of natural forests and 39,144 hectares of planted forests, which make up 41.38% of the total tree coverage. The low vegetation coverage in the city of Sétif is a concern as it can lead to soil erosion, reduced air quality, and decreased biodiversity. On the other hand, the high percentage of forested area within the wilaya provides important ecological benefits, including carbon sequestration, wildlife habitat, and recreation opportunities. It is crucial for the city to address the low vegetation coverage and work towards improving the balance between urbanization and preservation of the natural environment.

== Administration ==
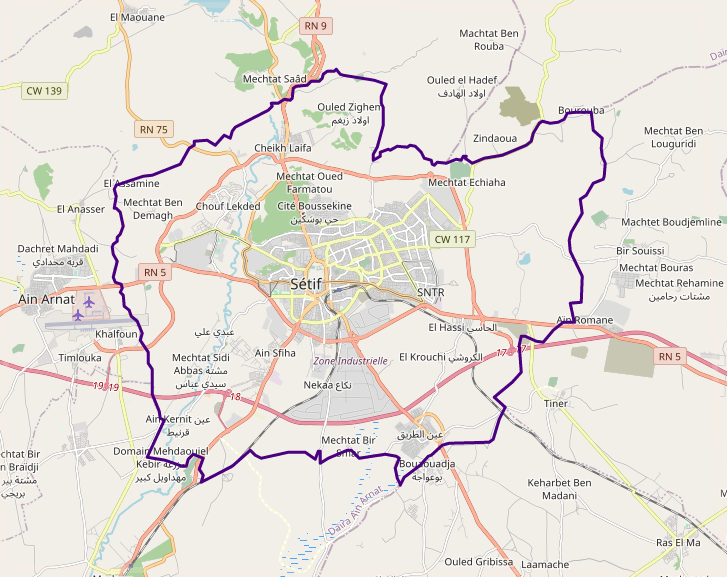

The municipality of Sétif was created at the beginning of independence, on July the 5th, 1962.

The municipality of Setif includes 12 administrative annexes elaborating the activities that affect the civil status of citizens. These annexes are: Downtown, Cité El Moustakbel (Birguey), Cité Yahaoui (Tandja), Cité 1er Novembre (1014), Bouaroua, El Hidhab, El Hassi, Ain Trik, El Baz, Chouf Lekdad, Chikh El Aifa, Tlidjan (Beau marché).

== Cityscape ==
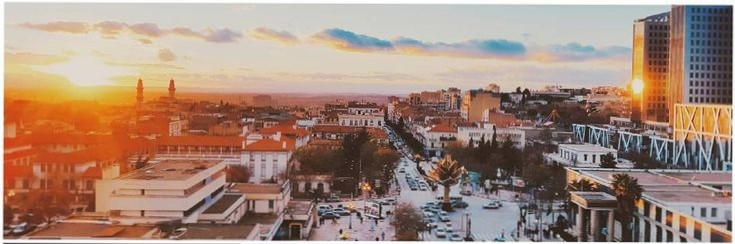
Downtown Sétif

=== Urbanism and architecture ===
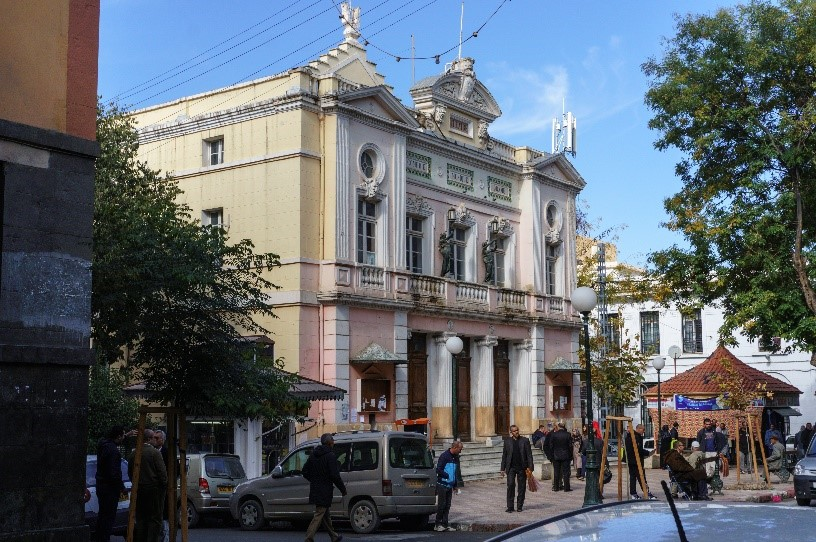
The municipal theater

Setif saw a significant growth in modern architecture between 1930 and 1962, reflecting the urban dynamics of the city and being influenced by various factors such as financial measures, technological processes, and the work of architects and contractors. The introduction of reinforced concrete was a catalyst for the development of modern architecture in the city, with François Hennebique design agency being instrumental in enabling the use of the material in various architectural works such as grain silos, banks, and townhouses. The colonial state was involved in social housing programs starting from the early 20th century, creating suburban housing districts, garden cities, and workers' housing schemes. The city center of Setif was reinvested twice, with modern architecture being promoted in the 1930s with public operations, and after World War 2 by the holders of agricultural capital, who consolidated the best locations to form tall buildings made with reinforced concrete structures. The new modern urban form neighborhood, The Pines, located at the southern boundary of the public hospital, which was highly regarded for its architecture and modern amenities. The architecture in The Pines was utilitarian, focusing on functionality and the absence of ornament, while the Bouaroua district located at the eastern end of the city saw a similar situation. Some buildings in Setif showed a return to the past with an Arabist style, drawing on Islamic architecture, and this return was seen as more of a Situationist approach than a doctrine. Setif was a testing ground for the Modern Movement, with the application and experimentation of modern architecture and building techniques, and a mix of traditional and modern elements being incorporated into the city's architectural language.

=== Environment ===
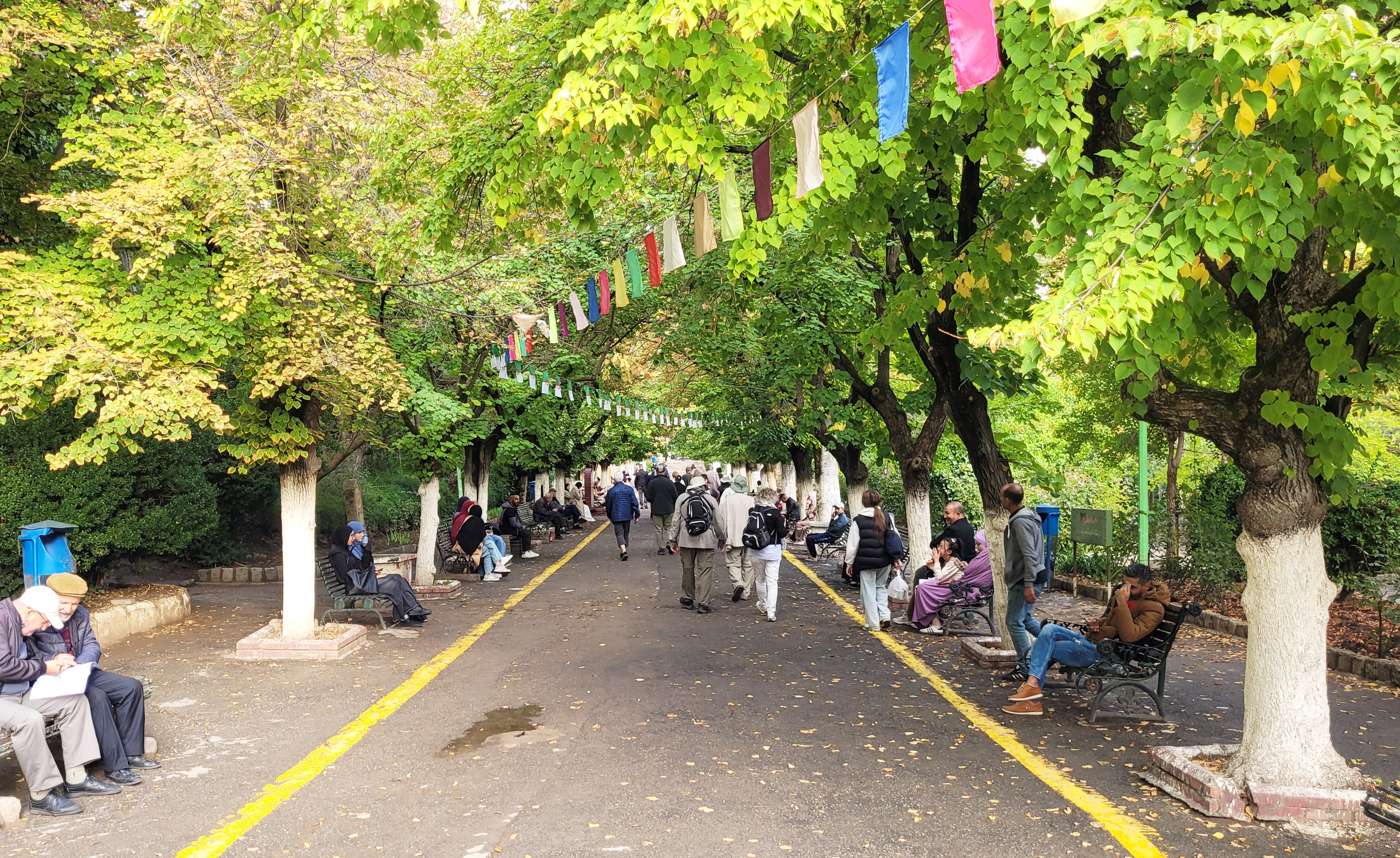
El Amir Abdelkader Garden

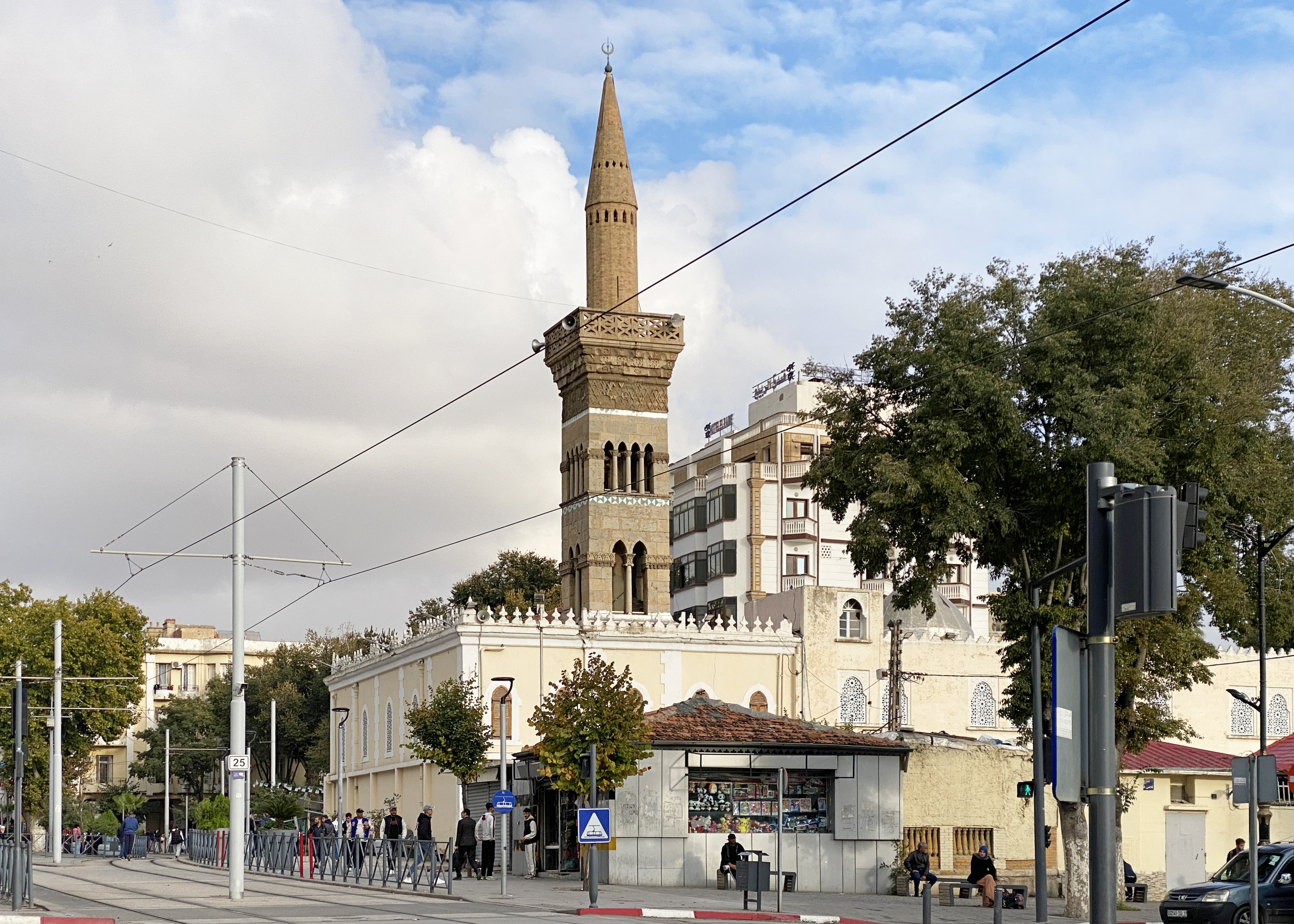
Al Atik mosque

In 2018, the carbon dioxide emissions per capita in Setif city were 1.84 tonnes per year, while in Setif province, the emissions per capita were 1.93 tonnes per year. In comparison, the carbon dioxide emissions per capita in Algeria were 1.77 tonnes per year.

These numbers indicate that the carbon carbon footprint of Setif city and province are quite higher compared to the national average, which could contribute to increased environmental degradation in the region. The authorities and local communities are taking action to reduce these emissions and promote sustainable practices that can help mitigate the impacts of climate change.

== Demographics ==
Year	Population
1900 (Estimate)	21,289
1950 (Estimate)	37,235
1966 (Census)	89,302
1977 (Census)	130,156
1987 (Census)	179,384
1998 (Census)	232,992
2008 (Census)	288,461
2015 (Estimate)	410,000

According to data from 2008, Setif had a population of 288,461, which ranked it as the eighth largest city in the country. The population is estimated at 410,000 by 2015. The city serves as the capital of the second most populated wilaya of Algeria and has experienced significant growth over the years. In 1900, the estimated population of Setif was 21,289 and by 1950, the population had grown to 37,235, which represents a 1.3% annual increase.

The population of Setif is relatively young, with a median age of 25.9 years. Women make up 49.6% of the population while men account for 50.4%. Despite the fact that the city has experienced rapid growth in recent years, it has managed to maintain its unique cultural identity and continues to attract people from all over the country.

The population of the municipality is growing at a sustained pace, particularly in the main hub of Sétif and the urban centers that surround it from all sides within the municipality. It is a population of different social scales and from various backgrounds, it is dispersed over the municipal territory with a more pronounced concentration in the town center that conquers new lands or encompasses old centers due to its all-around expansion. The municipality had 286,715 residents in 2006, of which 260,910 were in the town center. This figure represents a concentration percentage (91%) due to an average annual increase of approximately 5,000 residents per year since independence. In 2008, the last census gave a figure of 300,000 residents in the Sétif municipality. More than 90% of the population represents residents in the town center of the municipality, which has experienced significant expansions in the last fifty years.

== Economy ==
Sétif is one of the most industrialized municipalities in Algeria. The city is an economic hub with great potential for growth and investment. The region has a strong focus on agriculture and industry, and is home to many small and medium-sized enterprises (SMEs) which are key to its continued growth.

=== Employment ===
Sétif has potential of training almost 9,000 posts of professional and specialized training which can be readapted to the modern time, and of two university poles with 5,249 students

In terms of SMEs, the wilaya of Sétif has 4,384 businesses employing over 19,000 workers in the industry sector. The region also has two industrial zones in Sétif and El Eulma, and the mega industrial zone of Ouled Saber, which is expected to create an additional 19,000 jobs. In total, 15 activity zones have been created to support the growth of SMEs, and the public authorities have committed to creating 9 micro-zones to meet the growing demand for land.

Adviser to the President of the Republic for the economy, Abdelaziz Khellaf, has praised the wilaya of Sétif as one of the most important poles of industry in the country, thanks to the efforts and determination of its economic operators. Out of the 2,379 investment applications received, 1,175 have received a favorable opinion, resulting in 81,000 jobs being created in sectors such as industry, agro-food, building materials, and services. The director of industry and mines, Mermouchi Mohamed, also believes that the wilaya of Sétif is poised for a prosperous future in terms of investment, wealth creation, and job growth.

=== Cost of living ===
Setif is considered to be one of the least expensive cities in the world. According to the information provided, the average cost of living in Setif is €282, which puts it in the top 1% of the cheapest cities and ranks 12th out of 9,294 cities globally. In Algeria, Setif ranks 5th out of 30 cities in terms of cost of living. The median after-tax salary in Setif is €214, which is sufficient to cover living expenses for 0.8 months. This puts Setif at 9th best city to live in Algeria. It is a relatively affordable city to live in, with a cost of living that is lower compared to many other cities in the world. However, the median after-tax salary may not be enough to cover all living expenses for a full month, but the city's ranking as one of the best places to live in Algeria highlights its appeal as a potential destination for those seeking a good quality of life.

=== Agriculture ===
Agriculture is mainly in grain and livestock from the surrounding region. Locally produced wheat is processed by local factories to produce semolina, couscous and noodles.

Sheep breeding is very common in the Sétif region. The sheep population accounts for about 85% of the total livestock population with approximately 90,000 ewes.

Cattle breeding is highly developed in the most favorable suburban areas where irrigated forage crops or grasslands along the streams that run through the city from north to south are observed. They represent about 15% of the total large livestock population in the area.

Goat breeding alone is more common in the rural areas, in wooded and mountainous areas. In these peripheral farms, the goat is associated with sheep; however, the size of the populations is very small and does not exceed 10 heads per breeder.

Poultry breeding. Chicken egg farming accounts for nearly 62% of the structures of this activity, followed by chicken meat farming. e) Beekeeping is very rare in the agricultural landscape of Sétif. It is mostly only a diversification activity for farmers.

=== Industry ===
The city of Setif has an industrial base mainly focused on plastic processing, food processing and construction materials. As a result, Setif is among the first five pilot areas to host the future ZIDIs: Integrated Industrial Development Zones. Commercial activity is also very dynamic with more than 12,000 SMEs, which places the city of Setif in second place nationally, after the Algiers. There is an increasingly significant presence of Chinese, Spanish, Korean, German, Italian and French companies.

Other industries include woodworking, manufacture of carpets and metal handicrafts. Zinc is extracted from nearby deposits and there are hydroelectric development to the north. It has become the commercial center of a region where textiles are made, phosphates are mined and cereals grown.

=== Tourism ===
==== Monuments and attractions ====
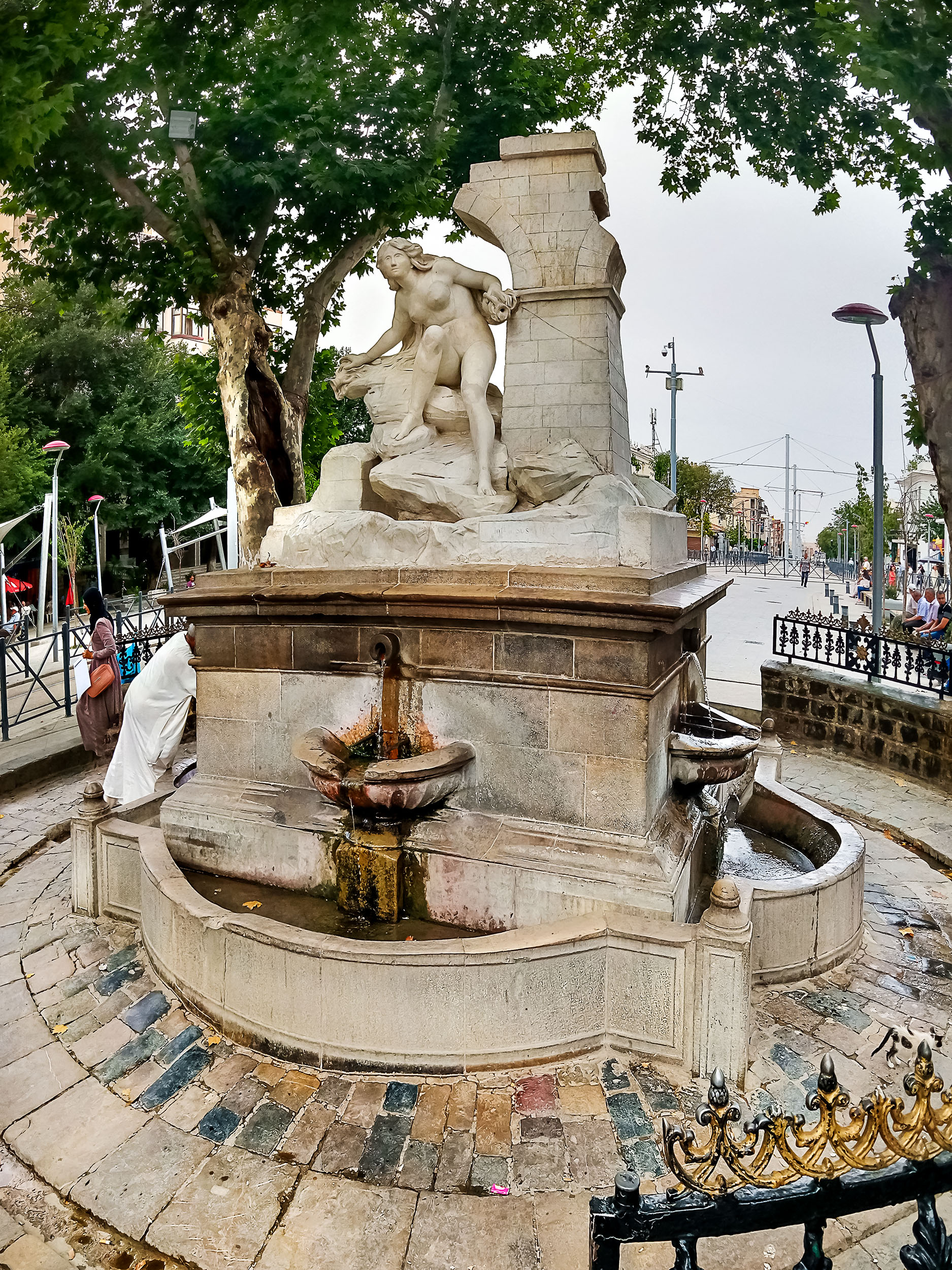
Ain Fouara fountain

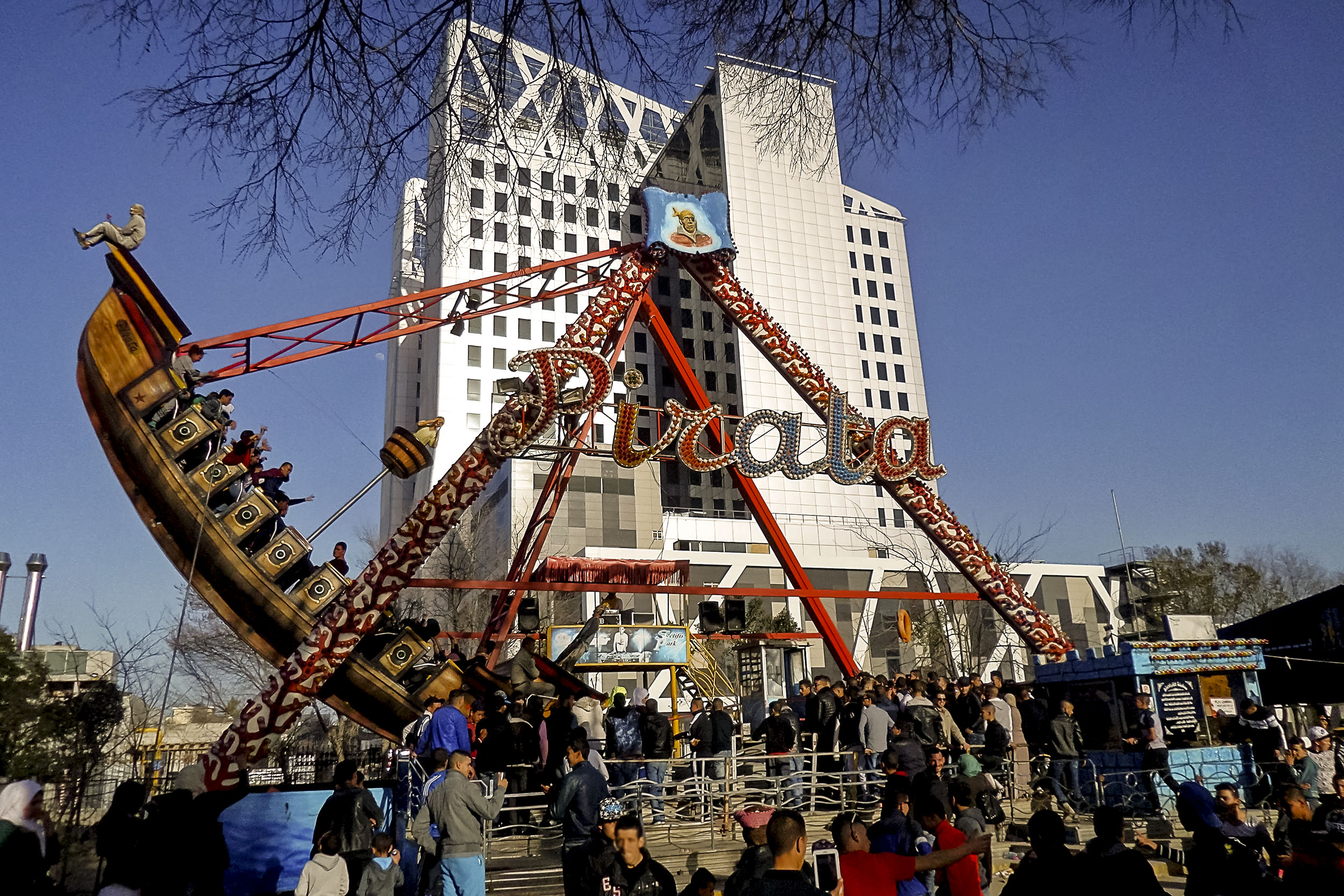
Park Mall seen from the amusement park

Ain El Fouara fountain is one of the most important historical monuments in the city of Sétif. It was moved to the city of Sétif during the time of French colonialism in 1899 AD and was placed in the heart of the old city in the middle of three religious monuments, the old mosque, the Jewish temple and the church, in the middle of Independence Square. This fountain represents a huge sculpture created by the French sculptor Francis de Saint-Vidal, the stories differed on the true history of the construction of this monument. No one is sure they know the history of Ain El Fouara, nor the story of the woman depicted in the statue, it was carefully sculpted by François de Saint Vidal, and it was previously on display in the French Louvre Museum before being transferred to Sétif in 1898, this statue was classified as a national heritage on November 3, 1999.

The Byzantine citadel of Sétif is a largely preserved carved stone wall that surrounded a Byzantine fortress built in the first half of the 6th century, around 540 AD. It was built by General Solomon with the aim of securing the Byzantine camp from surprise attacks. After the Islamic conquest of the city of Setif, the citadel was used for various purposes, including grain storage and as stables for animals. During the French colonial period, the citadel regained its original function as a defensive structure, with a military barracks and hospital being built inside it. The citadel is built from massive blocks of cut stone, 2.5 meters (8.2 ft) thick, in a rectangular shape. Park Mall Setif is a shopping mal that has been open since February 2016. Located along the Avenue de l'ALN, between the seat of the Wilaya to the east and the amusement park to the west, the large building includes a 5-storey shopping center, the largest in Algeria, a business center, a hotel and a multipurpose room The Dome

The Setif amusement park is a space for leisure and tourism in the heart of the city. Inside of it, we can find the Zoological Park that is home to around thirty species: Tigers, Lions, Hyenas, Camels, Macaques, Fennecs, etc.

== Culture ==
=== Music ===
The third most popular music genre in Algeria is Staifi after Rai and Kabyle. Based on the zendali rhythm, originally from Constantine, and also on keyboard accompaniment, this music is now very present in all Maghreb celebrations.

The first were Groupe Saada, then Samir Staifi, Bekhachi, Djamel, Nordine and others. Today, Editions Charihene (Batna), El Amir (Constantine), Intherlux (Sétif) and Boualem (Marseille) are representative of the "staifi" music. Katchou, Cheb Farat, Khalasse, Rochdi, Ghania, Fella, Djamal, Hasna, Yamina... are today the pillars of "staifi" music.

=== Cuisine and restaurants ===
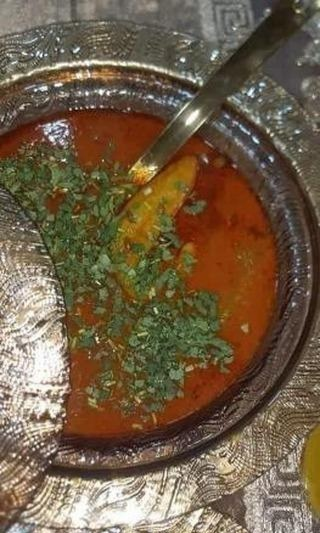
Setif's Chorba Frik

The Berboucha dish is typically Setifian, a couscous mainly with lamb, turnips and chard. The Mferemsa dish is also typical of the city, large sheets of dough, cooked and drizzled with a sweet, salty, sour and spicy red sauce, made up of onions, spices, tomatoes, chickpeas, apricots, and raisins, all accompanied by meat. Chorba frik, a traditional soup, is also very present in Setif, it's made of frik (cracked wheat), lamb, chicken, tomato, onion, spices; it is often served with bourek, an Algerian pastry made of a thin flaky dough with a variety of fillings, such as meat, cheese, spinach, or potatoes. Tagines, mechoui, ghraif (traditional pancakes) are other dishes we can find in the city.

For local pastries, we can mention makrout, gazelle horns, griouech, mbardja...

The economic intensity of Setif has favored the opening of several establishments offering menus of local, national international origin. The famous type of restaurants that specialize in traditional cuisine is locally known as Khaima, translates simply to "tent". These restaurants offer a diverse selection of local and national dishes, including Chakhchoukha, Zviti, Hmis, Mfaouer, Kesra... Khaimas are highly sought after, attracting both tourists and locals alike.

=== Jewelry ===
The art of jewelry making is one of the oldest traditional manual trades in Sétif, it is primarily based on gold and silver plates to produce items such as Esskhab, El-Mhezma, El-Mekkies, El-Djerrar, El-Khelkhal, etc....

=== Museums ===
The city of Sétif has acquired a museum tradition that dates back to the end of the 19th century with the first lapidary museum in the former garden of Orléans in 1896 (today the garden of the Emir Abdelkader), then it was a room of exhibition for works of art at the Albertini high school in 1932 (now Kerouani high school), then the old courthouse of the Wilaya was made available to the Ministry of Culture and Tourism to temporarily house the museum from 1965, a new museum was inaugurated on April 30, 1985, the Sétif museum was under the supervision of the Regional Museum (site museum) until its promotion to the National Museum on June 7, 1992.

==== National Public Museum of Setif ====
Built to the east of the old citadel opposite the current seat of the wilaya, the national museum, previously named the national museum of archeology, has a conference room, a projection room, a library, an exhibition hall, in addition to the rooms of the archeology museum which spans Prehistory, the Numidian, Roman, Byzantine and Muslim periods.

This museum is a living memory of Setif and its surroundings. The museum is organized as an itinerary with five stopovers presenting varied collections: mosaics, objects of various materials such as ceramics, glass, bronze, stone.

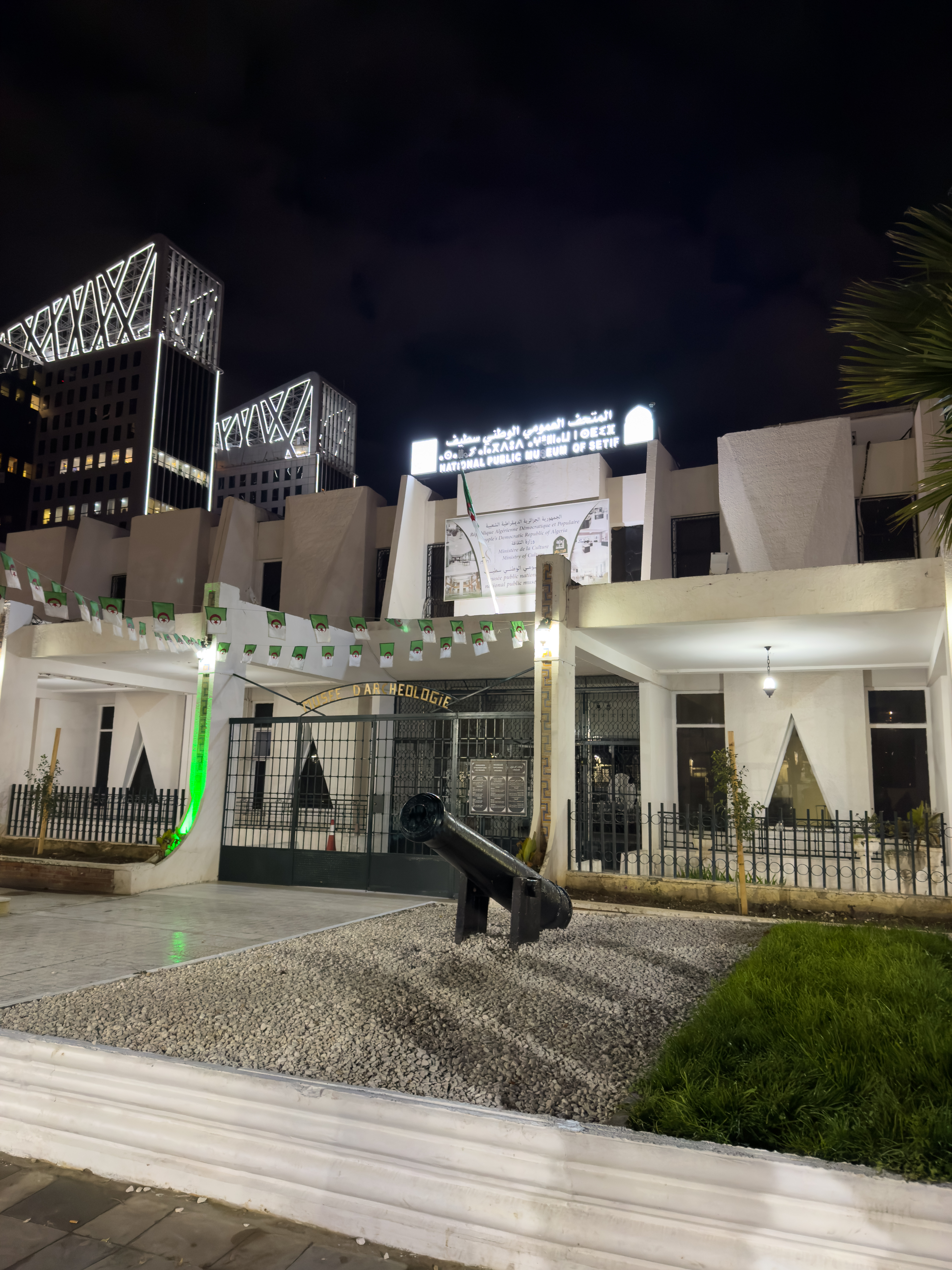
Exterior of the National Public Museum of Setif

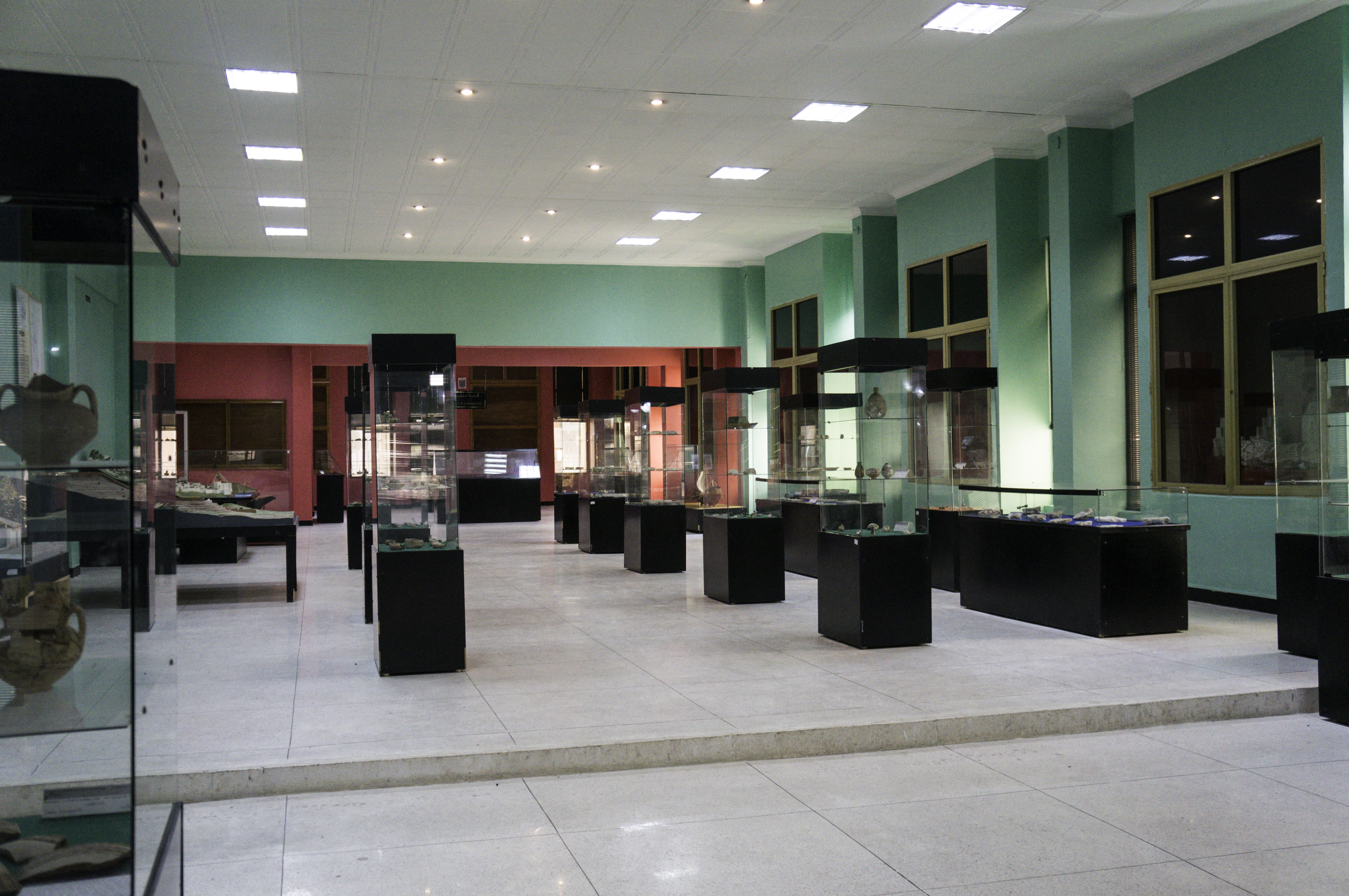
Inside the Museum

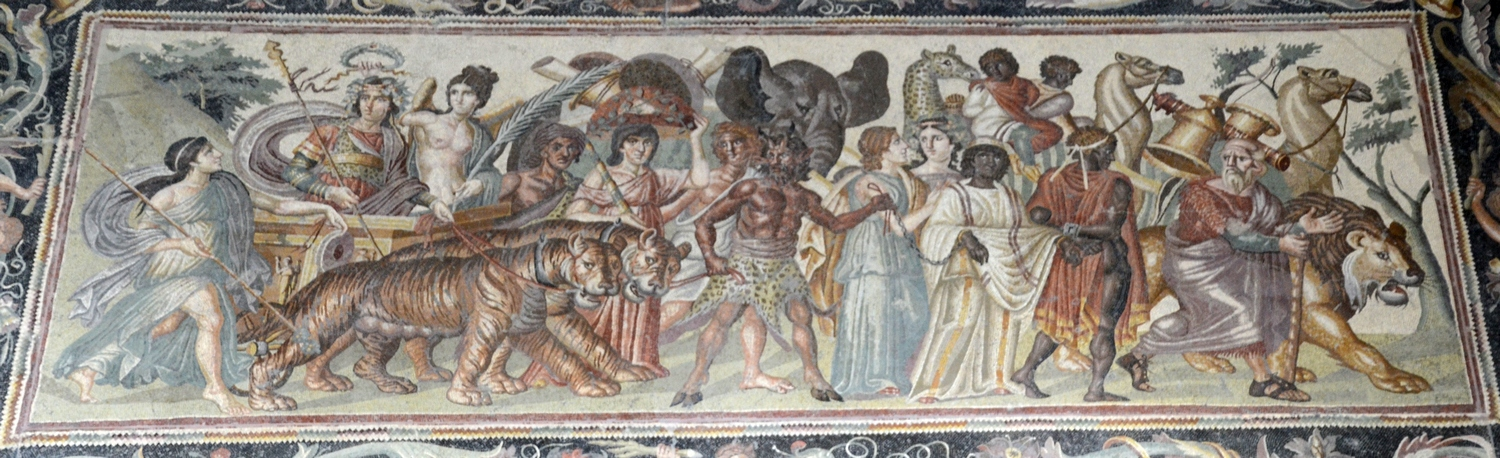
The Conquest of India by Dionysus at the archaeological museum of Sétif, ca. 200–300 CE

The first stopover leads to the heart of prehistory, which attests to the existence of a human civilization from the earliest ages in the region. The second stopover presents the Roman and Byzantine civilization which left many traces in Sétif, such as collections of ceramics, glass, funerary steles and especially mosaics including that of Venus or that of Bacchus.

The third stopover approaches the Islamic period with a collection of Fatimid pottery. Hammadid art is represented by ceramic fragments with epigraphic decoration; geometric and floral: the carved plaster columns and capitals are painted in green and red colors.

The fourth stopover presents the numismatics room where are exhibited coins minted with the effigy of the Numidian and Roman emperors as well as Muslim coins in gold and silver. The fifth stop presents the Museum's large collection of mosaics.

=== Festivals and celebrations ===
==== The international Sufi Samaa festival ====
A musical event that showcases the sacred songs of Sufi culture. It takes place at the Houari-Boumediene culture center in Sétif and features participants from different countries. The objective of the festival is to spread the art of Sufi Samaa to a wider audience and to make it a universal human spiritual phenomenon, transcending all ideologies. The curator of the festival considers it an opportunity for young talent to flourish and for the diversity of the local Algerian character to be embraced on a global scale.

==== The Sétif International Short Film Days ====
A cultural event that takes place in downtown Sétif. The event features the screening of Algerian and foreign short films, as well as feature films of Algerian production that have participated in film festivals. The objective of the event is to promote young talents in the field of cinema, encourage their emergence and boost the cultural dynamics in the region. The event includes a competition, with a jury made up of Algerian artists and directors evaluating the films on the program and awarding the Golden Spike prize to the best short film, among other prizes. Additionally, various activities such as debate sessions and professional workshops and masterclasses are also held during the event.

==== The National Graffiti Festival ====
An event aimed at young people which is held for several days in different neighborhoods of the city. It aims to make urban art a means of raising awareness about citizenship, promoting the culture of peace, and preventing social evils. The festival is initiated by the League of Scientific and Technical Activities of Young People and is being held in coordination with the Office of Youth Establishments and under the aegis of the Directorate of Youth and Sports.

==== The celebration of Yennayer ====
The traditional Amazigh (Berber) New Year celebration that take place in North Africa, particularly in Algeria, on January 12. The celebrations are associated with the agrarian calendar and involve a variety of rituals and customs. Some of the most notable traditions include the preparation of a collective dinner, the scattering of grains of wheat and corn on the trees as a symbol of a bountiful harvest, the cutting of the hair of children under one year old, the exchange of visits and various activities such as collective games, singing and invocations, and charitable actions towards the poor. The Yennayer celebrations also feature workshops for teaching the Amazigh alphabet to children, drawing, and the presentation of popular dishes, traditional Amazigh outfits, concerts, conferences, plays, and exhibitions that are mostly held in the Houari-Boumediene culture center and the national public museum. The celebration of Yennayer is seen as a way to highlight the values of the Amazigh culture, heritage, and traditions, which are an integral part of the culture in Setif and the country as a whole.

=== Heritage ===
The city conceals an archaeological heritage which pushed the services of UNESCO to advise the installation of an archaeological park with tourist and cultural aims. However, it is still not inscribed on the World Heritage List to this day. One of the emblematic monuments of the city is the old mosque (El Masdjid el Atik) as well as the fountain of Ain El Fouara.

== Education ==
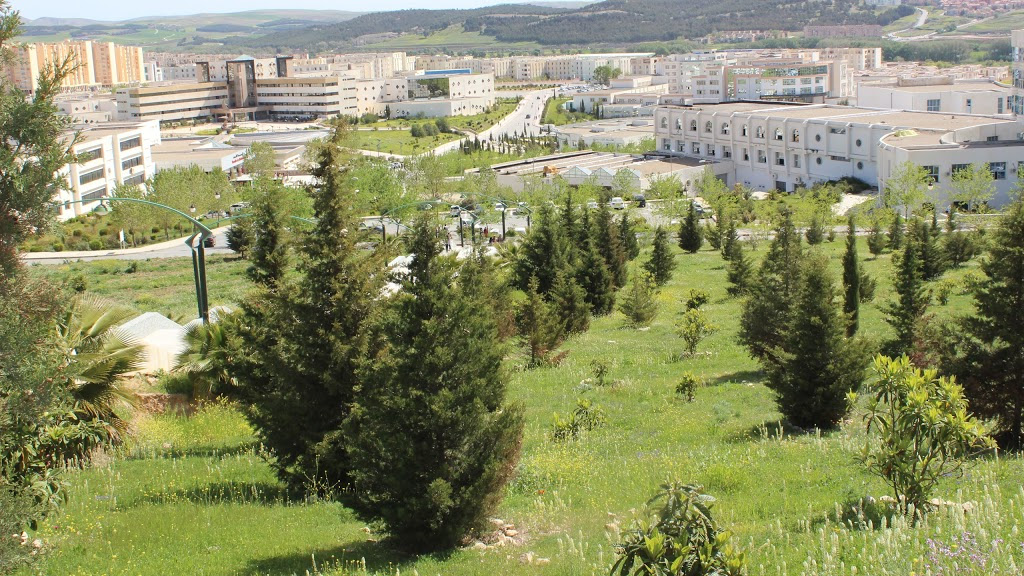
Setif 1 university compus

The school system in Setif is no different from the rest of Algeria, the city has many educational institutions, including primary, middle, and secondary schools, educational institutions through correspondence, and institutions of private education, and there are two large universities, the University of Setif 1 Farhat Abbas, the University of Setif 2 Mohamed Lamine Dabaghin, as well as institutes and institutions of higher education, which are run by the Directorate of Education of Setif, affiliated to the Algerian Ministry of Education, and they serve Algerian citizens, as well as those coming from the Arab world and African countries.

== Sports ==
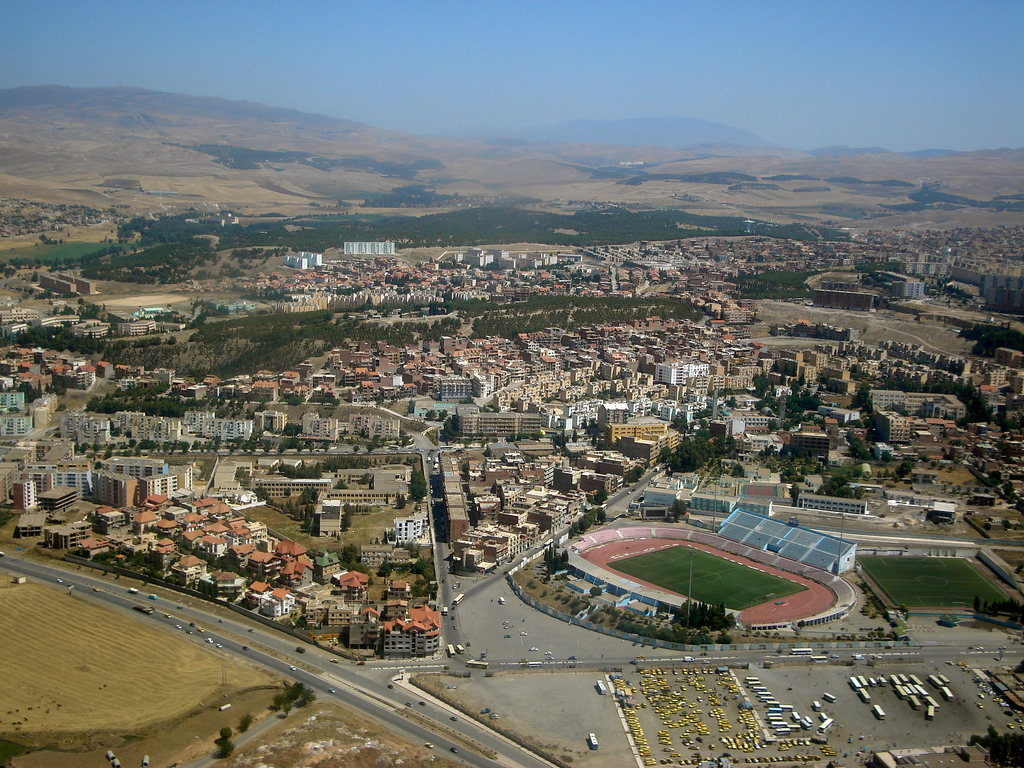
Aerial view of the 8 Mai 1945 stadium

Setif has a football club, the Entente Sportive de Sétif (ESS) founded in total discretion in September 1958, on the orders of the command of the FLN revolution, for a mission of Fidaye. Since then, the Entente has become a major club in the Algerian football scene with several national titles (8 Algerian Cups, 8 Championships including 2 doubles, and two Algerian Super Cups), as well as regional and international (2 Arab Cups of Champions Clubs, 2 African Cups of Champions Clubs, an Afro-Asian Cup, and an African Super Cup).

The city also has two other football teams: the Union Sportive Madinet Sétif (USMS) founded in 1933 (finalist in the Algerian Cup in 2005) and the Stade Africain Sétifien (SAS) founded in 1947.A new Olympic swimming pool in El Bez was inaugurated in 2014.

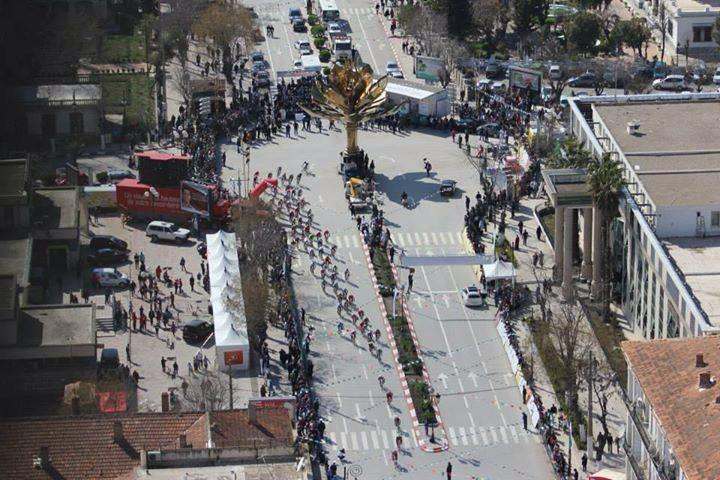
The international tour of Setif

Setif is the location of two international cycling competitions:

The Criterium international de Setif: cyclists race on a closed circuit of 40 laps totaling 128 kilometers (80 mi). The departure is in front of the headquarters of the wilaya of Sétif, avenue du 1er Novembre.

The International Tour of Setif: cyclists race in the wilaya of Sétif in three stages for a route totaling 346 kilometers (215 mi).

== Infrastructure ==
=== Transportation ===
Setif is a major city in Algeria and boasts a variety of transportation options to accommodate its residents. These include taxis, both public and private buses, the railway system, and the May 8, 1945, airport. In the future, the Setif Tramway, which will be the longest tramway line in Algeria at approximately 22.4 km (13.9 mi), is expected to be completed.

==== Buses ====
Road transportation in Setif is abundant and well-connected, with a vast network of highways and a variety of buses ranging from small to large.

The transport in the city is largely served by buses, which are operated by both private companies and government institutions. There are two types of bus service, one that operates within the boundaries of the city and the other that connects Setif to the rest of the province and other regions of Algeria. Urban transport buses, both large and small, are widely used in the city due to its large population, dense network and cheap price, ticket prices for both private and government buses are set at 20 dinars.

==== Taxis ====
Taxi services in Setif are extensive and come in three different forms: urban transport within the city, transportation between different departments within the city, and transportation to and from Setif and other areas of Algeria.

==== Rail ====
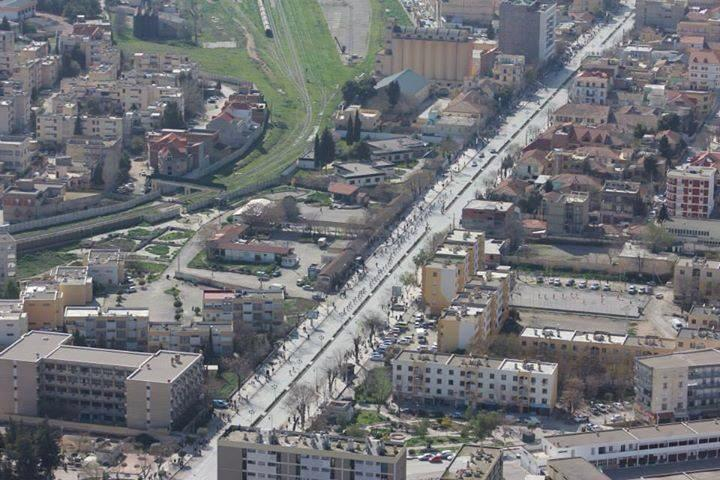
Railway passing by the city center, along with the tramway and the bus lines

The Setif train station is estimated to be around 118 years old (1897-2015). Its construction was agreed upon during the city's municipal meeting in 1877. The meeting decided that the construction of the station would be an appropriate way to celebrate the arrival of the train once the construction was completed in 1897. The station is located on the ALGER-CONSTANTINE (AC) line, with five (5) trains, three (3) of which go to the capital Algiers, one (1) to Constantine, and one (1) to Annaba. Approximately twelve (12) trains carrying goods from various places arrive daily at the Setif station.

==== Tramway ====
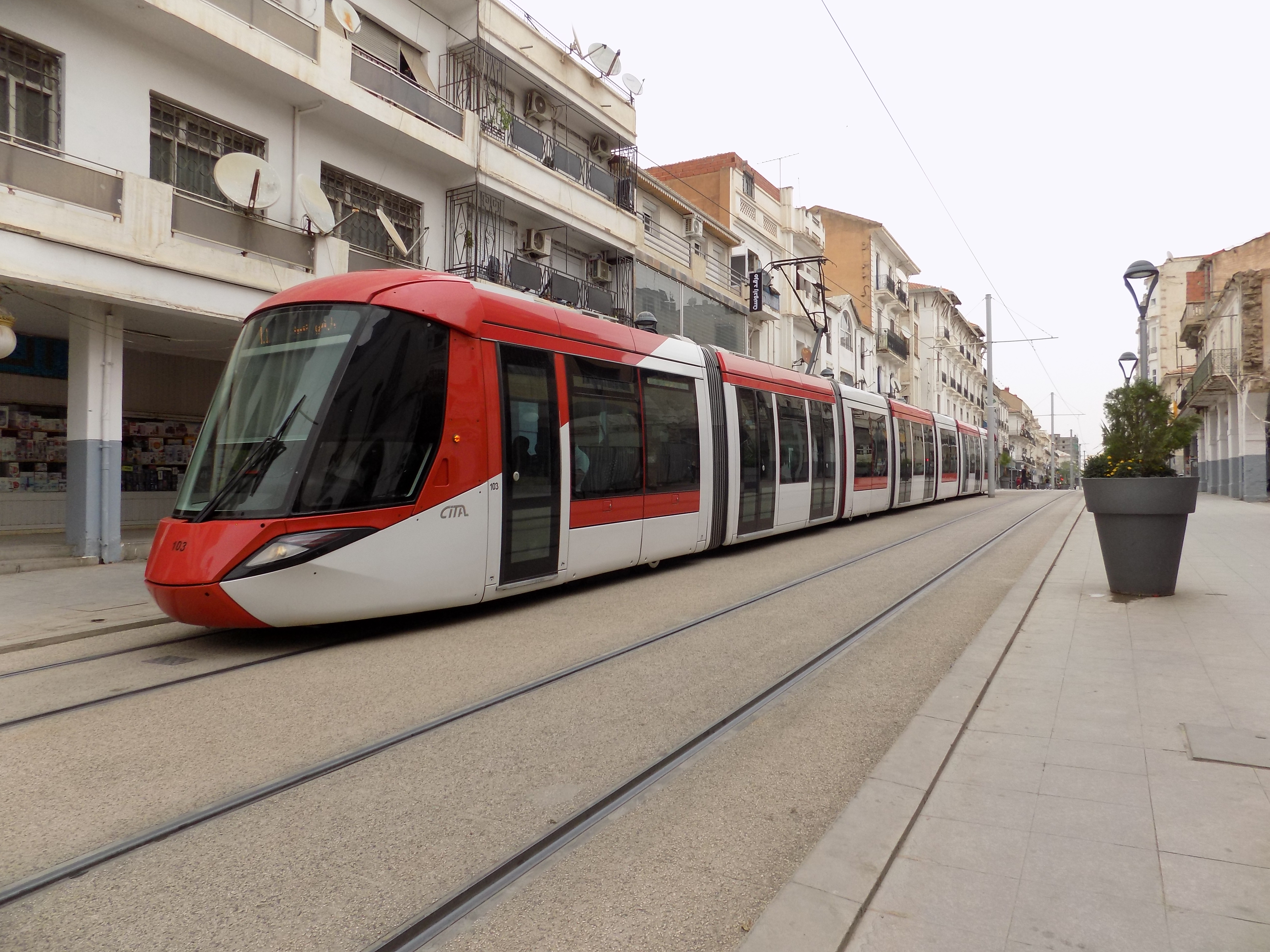
Setif tramway

The first line was opened on May 8, 2018, and spans a distance of 22.4 km with 26 stations, all with historical names. The first line connects between the University of Setif 1 Frahat Abbas (El Baz Pivot), the central university, the 8 May 1945 Stadium, the passenger transfer station, the city center, and the eastern neighborhoods of the city. The second line is yet to be completed and will link the industrial zones 1, 2, and 3, the bizar neighborhood, Bab Biskra, and the city center. The Sétif Tramway was built and equipped by a joint venture of Alstom and Turkey-based construction company Yapı Merkezi.

==== Air ====
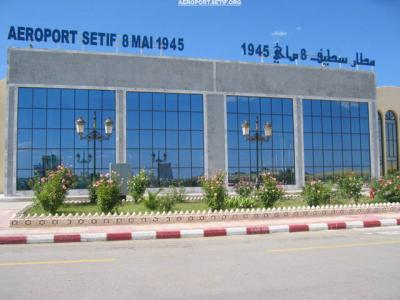
Exterior view of the airport terminal

Setif airport is an international civilian-military airport located 10 kilometers (6.2 mi) away from the city center and serving the province and the neighboring cities and provinces. The airport has an annual passenger capacity of 200,000.

This airport is also a military airport, hosting the 9th training helicopter regiment (9th RHE) of the Algerian Air Force, as well as an infantry training center and the 4th commando parachute regiment (4th RPC) of the Algerian army.

The airport has been renovated and modernized in general with the replacement of baggage carousels as well as the installation of duty free and 8 new stores as well as 4 airline offices and a bank branch.

The terminal has 10 check-in counters, 8 PAF filters at the level of departures, and at international arrivals, the airport has 11 boxes, one of which is dedicated to disabled persons. The terminal building has increased from a capacity of 250,000 passengers/year to 450,000 passengers/year. It also has a parking lot with a capacity of 266 cars.

=== Energy ===
Sétif is at the forefront of energy coverage in the country, according to a recent statement by an official from the Sonelgaz Group. With 99% of its population having access to electricity and 97% to natural gas, Sétif has a surplus of energy, exceeding demand by 50%. Despite this, the wilaya is pursuing further energy projects, including the construction of a 60/220 kilovolt transformer in the city of Sétif and another 30/60 kilovolt transformer in El Eulma. The CEO of Sonelgaz Group also stated that the wilaya has provided over 11,900 homes with electrical energy and 2,250 homes with natural gas in previously under-served areas. In line with the President's policy to improve living conditions, over 350 farms have been connected to electricity and the state is committed to connecting all industrial zones to both gas and electricity. Schools and new homes will not experience any delays in being connected to energy, as Sonelgaz has canceled payment conditions prior to connection charges.

== International relations ==
=== Twin towns – sister cities ===
Setif is twinned with 13 cities from 5 continents:

- Al Ahmadi, Kuwait
- Cairo, Egypt
- Dubai, United Arab Emirates
- Gaza, Palestine
- Kuala Lumpur, Malaysia
- Lyon, France
- Medina, Saudi Arabia
- Miami, United States of America
- Osaka, Japan
- Rennes, France (1982)
- Rio de Janeiro, Brazil
- Shiraz, Iran
- Villefranche-sur-Saône, France

== Notable people ==
- Ferhat Abbas, politician, lived there;
- Fatima Zohra Ardjoune, first woman in the Arab world to become a general; doctor of medicine, pioneer of hematology research.
- Jean-Luc Azoulay, French producer, screenwriter, lyricist, and composer, born there on September 23, 1947
- Rabah Belamri, writer
- Omar Belhouchet, journalist and director of the daily El Watan from 1990 to 2019
- Henri Boério, French gymnast, Olympic medalist, born there in 1952
- Mabrook Dreidi, writer and academic
- Denis Guedj, writer and mathematician, born there in 1940
- Rebiha Khebtani, politician, mayor of Sétif
- Faris Khenniche, footballer
- Denise Morel, writer, born there on August 10, 1946;
- Kateb Yacine, writer, lived there

== See also ==
- Sitifis Roman circus
- Ain El Fouara Fountain
- List of cities in Algeria
