= Mabrook Dreidi =

Algerian author

- Born: May 2, 1978 (age 48); Sétif, Algeria
- Occupation: University Professor
- Awards: Arab Creativity Award, Sharjah in 2016; Al Tayeb Salih International Prize for Written Creativity in 2018

Mabrook Dreidi Ben El Mekki (Arabic: مبروك دريدي) is an Algerian writer and academic, born in Sétif on 2 May 1978. He has written articles, criticism and novels. He is a professor of Arabic literature at Setif 1 University.

== Biography ==
Mabrook Dreidi was born on 2 May 1978 in Sétif in northeastern Algeria. He entered primary education in 1984/1985. In 1990 he moved to the preparatory level, and in 1993 he moved to the secondary level to obtain a baccalaureate degree in the Arts and Humanities Branch. He entered the university to complete his studies within the Arabic Literature Study Division, where he received his bachelor's degree. He passed the graduate studies competition to defend his master's thesis in modern literature at the Constantine the Philosopher University in Nitra, after which he completed his doctorate, and was awarded it in 2014. He was appointed professor at the University of Setif 2, Faculty of Arts and Languages. He is married and has two sons.

== Writings ==
Narratives:

- "In the presence of water"
- "Valley of the Jinn"
- "Lampedusa"
- "The last crow"

Books:

- Popular Story (released in 2011)
- A collective book on the Algerian resistance (published in 2012)
- A collective book on popular songs (released in 2013)
- A collective book on the novel and methodology (published in 2015)
- A collective book on religion and identity (published in 2016)
- Place in the Narrative Text: Structure and Significance (issued on January 1, 2020)
