= Park Mall Sétif =

Shopping center in Algeria

Setif Park Mall
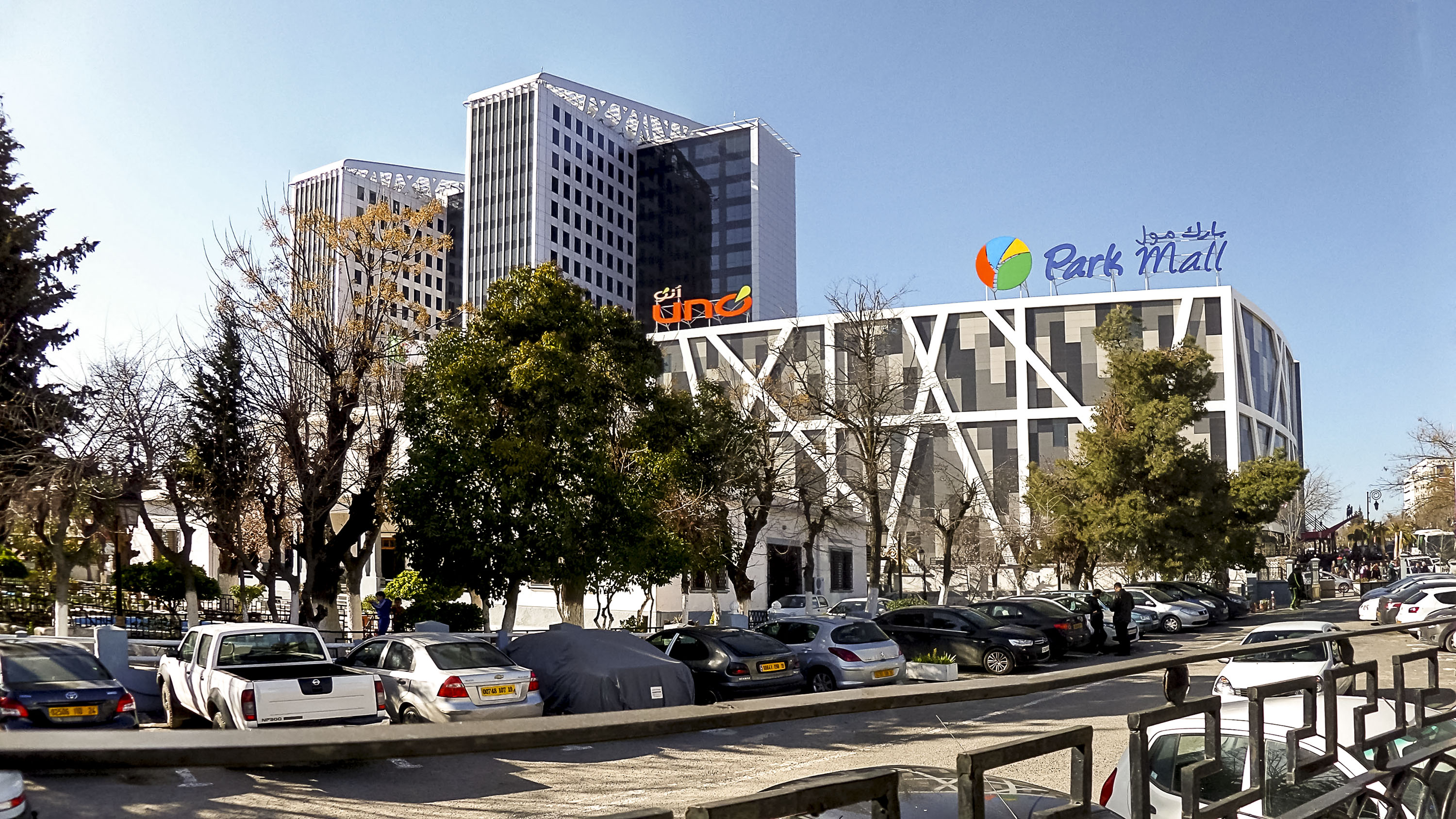
- Interactive map of the Setif Park Mall area

General information
- Location: Sétif, Algeria
- Coordinates: 36.19°N 5.41°E
- Opening: 4 February 2016

Height
- Roof: 85 metres (279 ft)

Technical details
- Floor count: 14
- Floor area: 113,000 m^{2} (1,220,000 sq ft)

Other information
- Parking: 1400 spaces

Website
- parkmallsetif-dz.com

The Setif Park Mall (Arabic: المركز التجاري لسطيف) is a shopping mall in Sétif, Algeria.

The construction of the Centre Commercial Sétif was in charge of the Algerian group. The Construction began in May 2011 and completion on 4 February 2016.

== Description ==
Park Mall with an area of 14 hectares and 41 250 m^{2} useful. The first floor houses a Viva hypermarket. The second floor houses signs, franchised stores. The third floor, along the avenue of the ALN is intended for recreation with no less than 7 000 m^{2} of games and fun activities for children and adults, 138 m^{2} bowling hall with 10 tracks, 6 kiosks, 2 cafeterias, a 400 m^{2} ice rink with terraces, a cinema area 7 D. The fourth floor with an area of 7000 m^{2} is home to 13 restaurants, which have views of the city, Vivarea Food and Food Court.

The second 17-storey tower houses a large, 192-room, 4-star hotel in the international Marriott chain. The 18-storey tower houses offices and services, the last 5 floors of which house some twenty luxury apartments of nearly 200 m^{2} each. The other 8 floors house no fewer than 28 business and service offices. The space adjacent to the hotel houses a 1,822 m^{2} conference room. The rest of the complex houses a meeting room, a fitness room and a swimming pool. he basement of the complex houses a parking of 4 levels, with a total capacity of 1400 vehicles.
