= Maurice Faivre =

French general and political scientist (1926–2020)

- Born: 13 March 1926; Morteau, France
- Died: 4 November 2020 (aged 94)
- Education: École spéciale militaire de Saint-Cyr
- Military career
- Allegiance: France
- Branch: French Armed Forces
- Rank: General
- Conflicts: Algerian War

Maurice Faivre (19 March 1926 – 4 November 2020) was a French general and political scientist.

He fought for France in the Algerian War, on which he published numerous works.

== Education ==
- École spéciale militaire de Saint-Cyr (1947–1949)
- Saumur Cavalry School (1949–1950, 1958)
- Collège interarmées de défense (1964–1966)
- Master of Advanced Studies from Politique de Défense, Strasbourg (1981)
- Doctorate of Political Science from Sorbonne University (1986)

== Bibliography ==
- Les nations armées (1988)
- Un village de harkis (1994)
- Les combattants musulmans de la guerre d'Algérie (1995)
- L'Algérie, l'Otan, la bombe (1998)
- Les archives inédites de la politique algérienne (2000)
- Conflits d'autorité durant la guerre d'Algérie (2004)
- Le Renseignement dans la guerre d'Algérie (2006)

== Distinctions ==
- Cross for Military Valour (1957)
- Ordre national du Mérite
- Commander of the Legion of Honour (2016)
- Member of the Académie des sciences d'outre-mer (2002)
