= Bordj Ghedir District =

Coordinates: 35°54′04″N 4°53′53″E

- District
- Interactive map of Bordj Ghedir District
- Country: Algeria
- Province: Bordj Bou Arréridj Province
- Time zone: UTC+1 (CET)

The Bordj Ghedir District is a district of Bordj Bou Arréridj Province, Algeria.

The district is further divided into 5 municipalities:

- Bordj Ghédir
- Belimour
- El Anseur
- Ghilassa
- Taglait

== Geography ==
The Bordj Ghedir District is located in the north of Algeria in the province of Bordj Bou Arréridi. The largest settlement in the Bordj Ghedir District is the town of Bordj Ghedir. There are 12 villages and 29 hamlets in the district. There are five communes in the Bordj Ghedir District. Those being Belimour, El Annasser, Taglait, Bordj Ghedir, and Ghilassa. The Bordj Ghedir District borders the Bordj Bou Arréridi District, Salah Bey District, Medjana District, El Hamadia District, Ras El Oud District, Aïn Taghrout District, Bir Kasd Ali District, Magra District, and the Ouled Derrajd District.
