= Mansourah District (Bordj Bou Arréridj Province) =

Coordinates: 36.081847°N 4.460106°E

- District
- Interactive map of Mansourah District
- Country: Algeria
- Province: Bordj Bou Arréridj Province
- Time zone: UTC+1 (CET)

Mansourah District is a district of Bordj Bou Arréridj Province, Algeria.

== Municipalities ==
The district is further divided into 5 municipalities:

- Mansoura
- Ben Daoud
- El M'hir
- Haraza
- Ouled Sidi Brahim
