= Djaâfra District =

Coordinates: 36°12′N 2°05′E

- District
- Interactive map of Djaâfra District
- Country: Algeria
- Province: Bordj Bou Arréridj Province
- Time zone: UTC+1 (CET)

Djaâfra District is a district of Bordj Bou Arréridj Province, Algeria.

== Municipalities ==
The district is further divided into 4 municipalities:

- Djaafra
- Colla
- El Main
- Tafreg
