= Medjana District =

Coordinates: 36°08′N 4°40′E

- District
- Interactive map of Medjana District
- Country: Algeria
- Province: Bordj Bou Arréridj Province
- Time zone: UTC+1 (CET)

Medjana District is a district of Bordj Bou Arréridj Province, Algeria.

== Municipalities ==
The district is further divided into 4 municipalities:

- Medjana
- El Achir
- Hasnaoua
- Teniet En-Nasr
