= Bordj Zemmoura District =

Coordinates: 36°16′01″N 4°51′01″E

- District
- Country: Algeria
- Province: Bordj Bou Arréridj Province
- Time zone: UTC+1 (CET)

Bordj Zemmoura District is a district of Bordj Bou Arréridj Province, Algeria.

== Municipalities ==
The district is further divided into 3 municipalities:

- Bordj Zemoura
- Ouled Dahmane
- Tassamert
