= Turks in Algeria =

Community in Algeria

Women of Algeria in their traditional dress (c. 1876–1888).

The Turks in Algeria, also commonly referred to as Algerian Turks, Algerian-Turkish Algero-Turkish and Turkish-Algerians were the ethnic Turkish and renegades who emigrated to Algeria during the Ottoman period. A significant number of Turks intermarried with the native population, and the male offspring of these marriages were referred to as Kouloughlis (Turkish: kuloğlu) due to their mixed Turkish and central Maghrebi heritage. However, in general, intermarriage was discouraged, in order to preserve the "Turkishness" of the community. Consequently, the terms "Turks" and "Kouloughlis" have traditionally been used to distinguish between those of full and partial Turkish ancestry.

== History ==
=== Ottoman era (1515–1830) ===
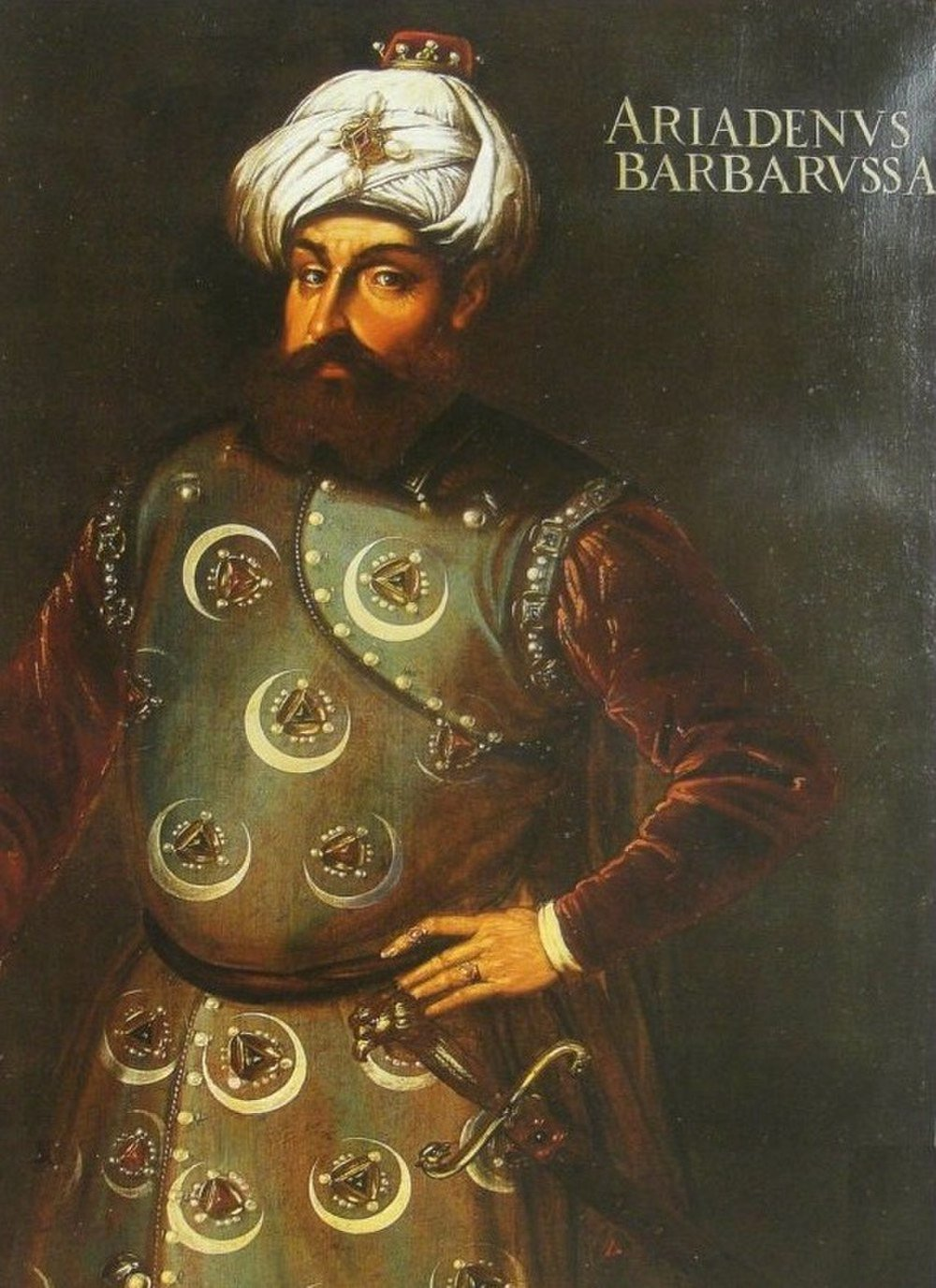
Hayreddin Barbarossa, an Ottoman admiral, was the founder of the Regency of Algiers (Ottoman Algeria).

The foundation of Ottoman Algeria was directly linked to the establishment of the Ottoman province (beylerbeylik) of the Maghreb at the beginning of the 16th century. At the time, fearing that their city would fall into Spanish hands, the inhabitants of Algiers called upon Ottoman corsairs for help. Headed by Oruç Reis and his brother Hayreddin Barbarossa, they took over the rule of the city and started to expand their territory into the surrounding areas. Sultan Selim I (r. 1512–20) agreed to assume control of the Maghreb regions ruled by Hayreddin as a province, granting the rank of governor-general (beylerbey) to Hayreddin. In addition, the Sultan sent 2,000 janissaries, accompanied by about 4,000 volunteers to the newly established Ottoman province of the Maghreb, whose capital was to be the city of Algiers. These Turks, mainly from Anatolia, called each other "yoldaş" (a Turkish word meaning "comrade") and called their sons born of unions with local women "Kuloğlus", which implied that they considered their children's status as that of the Sultan's servants. Likewise, to indicate in the registers that a certain person is an offspring of a Turk and a local woman, the note "ibn al-turki" (or "kuloglu") was added to his name.

The exceptionally-high number of Turks greatly affected the character of the city of Algiers and that of the province at large. In 1587, the province was divided into three different provinces, which were established where the modern states of Algeria, Libya and Tunisia were to emerge. Each of the provinces was headed by a Pasha sent from Constantinople for a three-year term. The division of the Maghreb launched the process that led eventually to the janissary corps' rule over the province. From the end of the 16th century, Algiers' Ottoman elite chose to emphasise its Turkish identity and to nurture its Turkish character to a point at which it became an ideology.

The lifestyle, language, religion, and area of origin of the Ottoman elite's members created remarkable differences between the Algerian Ottoman elite and the indigenous population. For example, members of the elite adhered to Hanafi law while the rest of the population subscribed to the Maliki school. Most of the elites originated from non-Arab regions of the Empire. Furthermore, most members of the elite spoke Ottoman Turkish while the local population spoke Algerian Arabic and even differed from the rest of the population in their dress.

==== Recruiting the military-administrative elite ====
From its establishment, the military-administrative elite worked to reinvigorate itself by enlisting volunteers from non-Arab regions of the Ottoman Empire, mainly from Anatolia. Hence, local recruiting of Arabs was almost unheard of and during the 18th century a more or less permanent network of recruiting officers was kept in some coastal Anatolian cities and on some of the islands of the Aegean Sea. The recruitment policy was therefore one of the means employed to perpetuate the Turkishness of the Ottoman elite and was practiced until the fall of the province in 1830.

==== Marriages to local women and the Kuloğlus ====
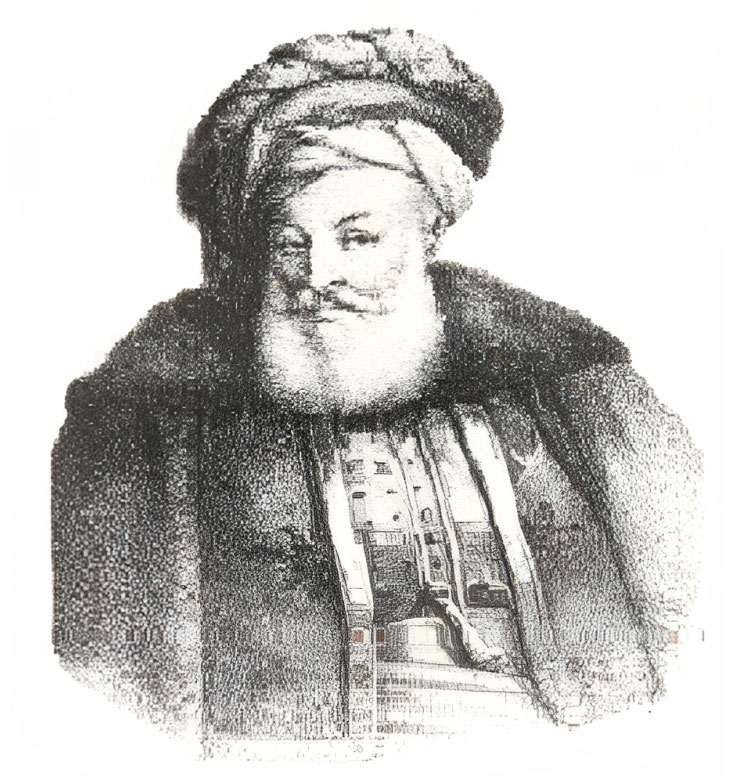
Contrary to all custom, Ahmed Bey ben Mohamed Chérif, a kouloughli, was the last Ottoman Bey of Constantine, in the Regency of Algiers, ruling from 1826 to 1848.

During the 18th century, the militia practiced a restrictive policy on marriages between its members and local women. A married soldier would lose his right of residence in one of the city's eight barracks and the daily ration of bread to which he was entitled. He would also lose his right to purchase a variety of products at a preferential price. Nonetheless, the militia's marriage policy made clear distinctions among holders of different ranks: the higher the rank, the more acceptable the marriage of its holder. This policy can be understood as part of the Ottoman elite's effort to perpetuate its Turkishness and to maintain its segregation from the rest of the population. Furthermore, the militia's marriage policy, in part, emerged from fear of an increase in the number of the kuloğlus.

The kuloğlus refer to the male offspring of members of the Ottoman elite and the local Algerian women. Due to their link to the local Algerian population via his maternal family, the kuloğlus' loyalty to the Ottoman elite was suspected because of the fear that they might develop another loyalty and so they were considered a potential danger to the elite. However, the son of a non-local woman, herself an "outsider" in the local population, represented no such danger to the Ottoman elite. Therefore, the Algerian Ottoman elite had a clear policy dictating the perpetuation of its character as a special social group, which was separated from the local population.

Nonetheless, John Douglas Ruedy points out that the kuloğlus also sought to protect their Turkishness:

"Proud and distinctive appearing, Kouloughlis often pretended to speak only Turkish and insisted on worshipping in Hanafi [i.e. Ottoman-built] mosques with men of their own ethnic background. In times of emergency they were called upon to supplement the forces of the ojaq."

In the neighbouring province of Tunisia, the maintenance of the Turkishness of the ruling group was not insisted upon, and the kuloğlus could reach the highest ranks of government. However, the janissary corps had lost its supremacy first to the Muradid dynasty (Murad Bey's son was appointed bey), and then to the Husainid dynasty. The Tunisian situation partly explains the continuation of the Algerian janissary corps' recruitment policy and the manifest will to distance the kuloğlus from the real centres of power. Nonetheless, high-ranking kuloğlus were in the service of the ocak, in military and in administrative capacities, occupying posts explicitly considered out of bounds for them; although there were no kuloğlus who was dey during the 18th century, this seems to be the only exception.

=== French era (1830–1962) ===
Once Algeria came under French colonial rule in 1830, approximately 10,000 Turks were expelled and shipped off to Smyrna; moreover, many Turks (alongside other natives) fled to other regions of the Ottoman realms, particularly to Palestine, Syria, Arabia, and Egypt. Nonetheless, by 1832, many Algerian-Turkish descended families, who had not left Algeria, joined a coalition with Emir Abdelkader in order to forge the beginning of a powerful resistance movement against French colonial rule.

== Culture ==
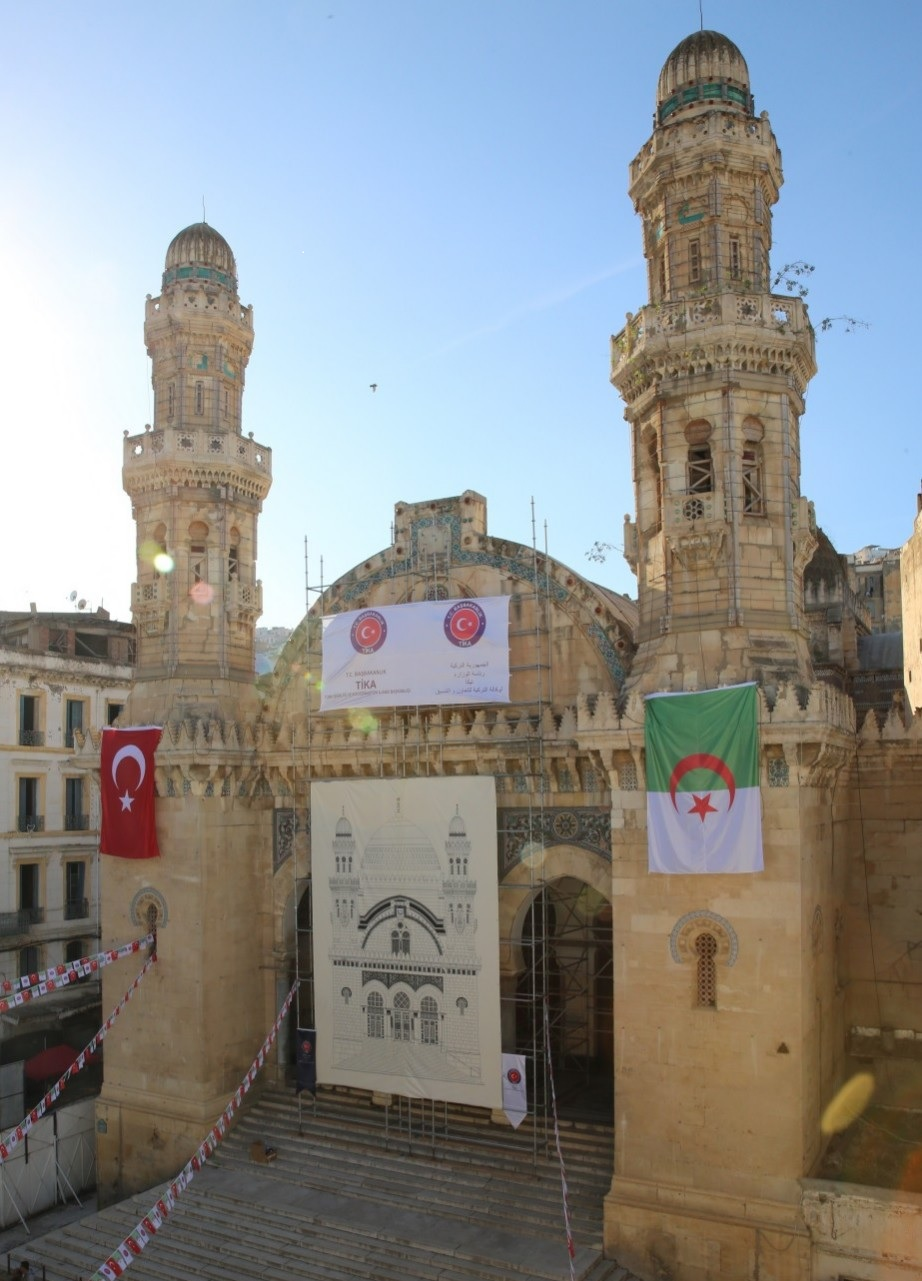
The Ketchaoua Mosque (Turkish: Keçiova Camii) in Algiers was built in 1612 by the Ottoman Turks. It was recently restored by the Turkish government.

Due to the three centuries of Ottoman rule in Algeria, today many cultural (particularly in regards to food, religion, and dress - and to a lesser extent language), architectural, as well as musical elements of Algeria are of Turkish origin or influence.

=== Language ===
During the Ottoman era, the Ottoman Turkish language was the official governing language in the region, and the Turkish language was spoken mostly by the Algerian Turkish community. However, today most Algerian Turks speak the Arabic language as their mother tongue. Nonetheless, the legacy of the Turkish language is still apparent and has influenced many words and vocabulary in Algeria. An estimated 634 Turkish words are still used in Algeria today. Therefore, in Algerian Arabic it is possible for a single sentence to include an Arabic subject, a French verb, and for the predicate to be in Berber or Turkish.

Moreover, families of Turkish origin have retained their Turkish family surnames; common names include Barbaros, Hayreddin, Osmanî, Stambouli, Torki, Turki, and Uluçali; job titles or functions have also become family names within the Algerian-Turkish community (such as Hazneci, Demirci, Başterzi, Silahtar).

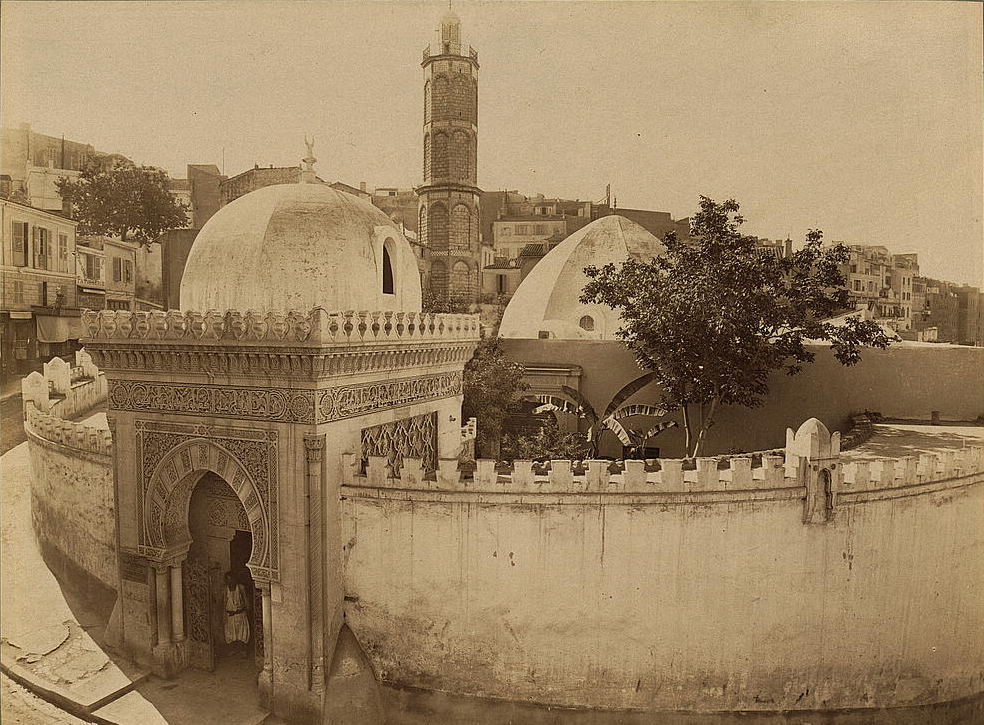
The Hassan Pasha Mosque (Turkish: Paşa Camii) in Oran was built in 1797 by the Ottoman Turks.

=== Religion ===
The Ottoman Turks brought the teaching of the Hanafi law of Sunni Islam to Algeria; consequently, their lifestyle created remarkable differences between the Ottoman Turks and the indigenous population because the ethnic Arabs and Berbers practiced the Maliki school.

Today, the Hanafi school is still practiced among the Turkish descended families. Moreover, the Ottoman mosques in Algeria are distinguishable by their octagonal minarets which were built in accordance with the traditions of the Hanafi rite.

=== Cuisine ===
Today the Turkish heritage in Algeria is most notably present in their cuisine which they have introduced to Algeria (such as Turkish coffee, Lahmacun, Böreks, desserts and pastries).

== Demographics ==
=== Areas of settlement ===
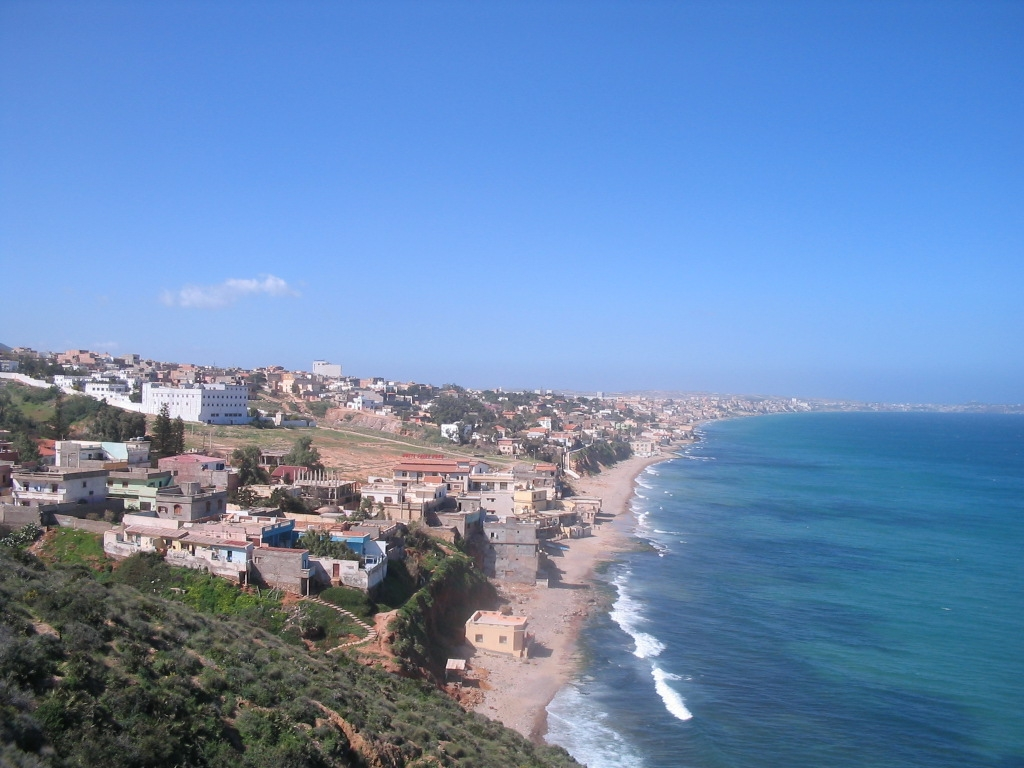
The Aïn El Turk (the "Fountain of the Turks") in Oran is one of several regions in Algeria named after the Turks.

During the Ottoman era, urban society in the coastal cities of Algeria evolved into an ethnic mix of Arabs, Berbers, Turks and Kouloughlis as well as other ethnic groups (Moors, and Jews). Thus, the Turks settled mainly in the big cities of Algeria and formed their own Turkish quarters; remnants of these old Turkish quarters are still visible today, such as in Algiers (particularly in the Casbah) Annaba, Biskra, Bouïra, Médéa, Mostaganem, and Oran (such as in La Moune and the areas near the Hassan Basha Mosque). Indeed, today, the descendants of Ottoman-Turkish settlers continue to live in the big cities. In particular, the Turks have traditionally had a strong presence in the Tlemcen Province; alongside the Moors, they continue to make up a significant portion of Tlemcen's population and live within their own sectors of the city.

The Turkish minority have traditionally also had notable populations in various other cities and towns; there is an established Turkish community in Arzew, Bougie, Berrouaghia, Cherchell, Constantine, Djidjelli, Mascara, Mazagran Oued Zitoun, and Tebessa. There is also an established community in Kabylie (such as Tizi Ouzou and Zammora).

Moreover, several suburbs, towns and cities, which have been inhabited by the Turks for centuries, have been named after Ottoman rulers, Turkish families or the Turks in general, including: the Aïn El Turk district (literally "Fountain of the Turks") in Oran, the town of Aïn Torki in the Aïn Defla Province, the Aïn Turk commune in Bouïra, the town of Bir Kasdali and the Bir Kasd Ali District in the Bordj Bou Arréridj Province, the town of Bougara and the Bougara District located in Blida Province, the suburb of Hussein Dey and the Hussein Dey District in the Algiers Province, as well as the town of Salah Bey and the Salah Bey District in the Sétif Province.

=== Diaspora ===
There are many Algerian Turks who have emigrated to other countries and hence make up part of Algeria's diaspora. Initially, the first wave of migration occurred in 1830 when many Turks were forced to leave the region once the French took control over Algeria; approximately 10,000 were shipped off to Turkey whilst many others migrated to other regions of the Ottoman Empire, including Palestine, Syria, Arabia, and Egypt. Furthermore, some Turkish/Kouloughli families also settled in Morocco (such as in Tangier and Tétouan).

== Common surnames ==
=== By provenance ===
The following list are examples of Turkish origin surnames which express an ethnic and provenance origin from Eastern Thrace and Anatolia - regions which today form the modern borders of the Republic of Turkey:

Surname used in Algeria	Turkish	English translation
Baghlali	Bağlılı	from Bağlı (in Çanakkale)
Bayasli	Payaslı	from Payas
Benkasdali; Benkazdali	Ben Kazdağılı	I am from Kazdağı
Benmarchali	Ben Maraşlı	I am from Maraş
Benterki	Ben Türk	I am Turk/Turkish
Bentiurki; Benturki	Ben Türk	I am Turk/Turkish
Ben Turkia; Ben Turkiya	Ben Türkiye	I am [from] Turkey
Bersali; Borsali; Borsari; Borsla	Bursalı	from Bursa
Boubiasli	Payaslı	from Payas
Chatli	Çatlı	from Çat (in Erzurum)
Chilali	Şileli	from Şileli (in Aydın)
Cholli	Çullu	from Çullu (in Aydın)
Coulourli	Kuloğlu	Kouloughli (mixed Turkish and Algerian origin)
Dengezli; Denizli; Denzeli	Denizli	from Denizli
Dernali	Edirneli	from Edirne
Djabali	Cebali	from Cebali (a suburb in Istanbul)
Djeghdali	Çağataylı	Chagatai (Turkic language)
Djitli	Çitli	from Çit (in Adana or Bursa)
Douali	Develi	from Develi (in Kayseri)
Guellati	Galatalı	from Galata (in Istanbul)
Kamen	Kaman	Kaman (in Nevşehir)
Karabaghli	Karabağlı	from Karabağ (in Konya)
Karadaniz	Karadeniz	from the Black Sea region
Karaman	Karaman	from Karaman
Kasdali; Kasdarli	Kazdağılı	from Kazdağı
Kaya; Kayali	Kayalı	from Kaya (applies to the villages in Muğla and Artvin)
Kebzili	Gebzeli	from Gebze (in Kocaeli)
Keicerli	Kayserili	from Kayseri
Kermeli	Kermeli	from the Gulf of Kerme (Gökova)
Kezdali	Kazdağılı	from Kazdağı
Kissarli; Kisserli	Kayserili	from Kayseri
Korghlu; Korglu; Koroghli; Korogli	Kuloğlu	Kouloughli (mixed Turkish and Algerian origin)
Koudjali; Kouddjali	Kocaeli	from Kocaeli
Koulali	Kulalı	from Kulalı (in Manisa)
Kouloughli; Koulougli; Kouroughli; Kouroughlou	Kuloğlu	A Kouloughli (mixed Turkish and Algerian origin)
Kozlou	Kozlu	from Kozlu (in Zonguldak)
Manamani; Manemeni; Manemenni	Menemenli	from Menemen (in İzmir)
Mansali	Manisalı	from Manisa
Meglali	Muğlalı	from Muğla
Merchali; Mersali	Maraşlı	from Maraş
Osmane; Othmani	Osman; Osmanlı	Ottoman
Ould Zemirli; Ould Zmirli	İzmirli	from İzmir
Rizeli	Rizeli	from Rize
Romeili; Roumili	Rumeli	from Rumelia
Sanderli	Çandarli	from Çandarlı
Sandjak; Sangaq	Sancak	from [a] sanjak (an administrative unit of the Ottoman Empire)
Satli	Çatlı	from Çat (in Erzurum)
Sekelli	İskeleli	from Iskele (in Muğla, Seyhan, or the island of Cyprus)
Sekli	Sekeli	from Söke (in Aydın)
Skoudarli	Üsküdarlı	from Üsküdar (in Istanbul)
Stamboul; Stambouli	İstanbulu	from Istanbul
Tchambaz	Cambaz	Cambaz (in Çanakkale)
Takarli	Taraklı	from Taraklı (in Adapazarı)
Tchanderli; Tchenderli	Çandarlı	from Çandarlı
Tekali	Tekeeli	from Teke Peninsula
Terki; Terqui	Türki	Turkish (language)
Terkman; Terkmani	Türkmenli	Turkmen (from Anatolia/Mesopotamia)
Torki	Türk	Turkish
Tourki; Tourquie; Turki	Türk	Turk/Turkish
Yarmali	Yarmalı	from Yarma (in Konya)
Zemerli; Zemirli; Zmerli; Zmirli	İzmirli	from İzmir
Zemir; Zmir	İzmir	İzmir

The following list are examples of Turkish origin surnames which express a provenance settlement of Turkish families in regions of Algeria:

Surname used in Algeria	Turkish	Meaning in English
Tlemsanili; Tilimsani	Tilimsanılı	from Tlemcen

The following list are examples of Turkish origin surnames traditionally used by Turkish families in Constantine:

Acheuk-Youcef, Ali Khodja, Bachtarzi, Benabdallah Khodja, Benelmadjat, Bestandji, Bendali Braham, Bentchakar, Bensakelbordj, Bentchikou, Khaznadar, Salah Bey, Tchanderli Braham.

=== By occupation ===
The following list are examples of some Turkish origin surnames which express the traditional occupation of Turkish families which settled in Algeria:

Surname used in Algeria	Turkish	English translation
Agha	ağa	agha
Ahtchi	ahçı, aşçı	cook, keeper of restaurant
Anberdji	ambarcı	storekeeper
Aoulak	ulak	messenger, courier
Arbadji	arabacı	driver
Atchi	atçı	horse breeder
Bacha	paşa	a pasha
Bachagha	başağa	head agha
Bachchaouch	başçavuş	sergeant major
Bachesais	başseyis	head stableman
Bachtaftar	başdefterdar	treasurer
Bachtarzi	baş terzi	chief tailor
Bachtoubdji	baştopçu	chief cannoneer, artilleryman
Baldji	balcı	maker or seller of honey
Bazarbacha; Bazarbarchi	pazarbaşı	head of bazaar
Benabadji	ben abacı	[I am a] maker or seller of garments
Benchauch	ben çavuş	[I am a] sergeant
Benchoubane	ben çoban	[I am a] shepherd
Bendamardji	ben demirci	[I am a] metalworker
Bendali	ben deli	[I am a] deli (Ottoman troops)
Benlagha	ben ağa	[I am a] agha
Benstaali	ben usta	[I am a] master, workman, craftsman
Bentobdji	ben topçu	[I am a] cannoneer
Bestandji; Bostandji	bostancı	bostandji
Bouchakdji	bıçakçı	cutler
Boudjakdji	ocakçı	chimney sweep
Boyagi	boyacı	painter
Chalabi; Challabi	çelebi	educated person, gentlemen
Chaouche	çavuş	sergeant
Chembaz; Chembazi	cambaz	acrobat
Damardji; Damerdji	demirci	metalworker
Debladji	tavlacı	stable boy or backgammon player
Dey	dayı	officer or maternal uncle
Djadouadji	kahveci	coffee maker or seller
Djaidji	çaycı	tea seller
Doumandji	dümenci	helmsman
Doumardji	tımarcı	stableman
Dumangi	dümenci	helmsman
Dumargi	tımarcı	stableman
Fenardji	fenerci	lighthouse keeper
Fernakdji	fırıncı	baker
Hazerchi	hazırcı	seller of ready-made clothing
Kahouadji	kahveci	café owner or coffee maker/grower
Kalaidji	kalaycı	tinner
Kaouadji	kahveci	café owner or coffee maker/grower
Kasbadji	kasapcı	butcher
Kassab	Kasap	butcher
Kaznadji	hazinedar	keeper of a treasury
Kebabdji	kebapçı	kebab seller
Kehouadji	kahveci	café owner or coffee maker/grower
Ketrandji	katrancı	tar seller
Khandji	hancı	innkeeper
Khaznadar	hazinedar	keeper of a treasury
Khaznadji	hazinedar	keeper of a treasury
Khedmadji	hizmetçi	maid, helper
Khodja; Khoudja	hoca	teacher
Louldji	lüleci	maker or seller of pipes
Koumdadji	komando	commando
Moumdji; Moumedji	mumcu	candle maker
Ouldchakmadji	çakmakçı	maker or seller of flints/ maker or repairer of flintlock guns
Nefradji	nüfreci	prepares amulets
Pacha	paşa	a pasha
Rabadji	arabacı	driver
Rais	reis	chief, leader
Saboudji; Saboundji	sabuncu	maker or seller of soap
Selmadji	silmeci	cleaner or to measure
Serkadji	sirkeci	maker or seller of vinegar
Slahdji	silahçı	gunsmith
Staali	usta	master, workman, craftsman
Tchambaz	cambaz	acrobat

=== Other surnames ===
Surname used in Algeria	Turkish	English translation
Arslan	aslan	a lion
Arzouli	arzulu	desirous, ambitious
Baba; Babali	baba	a father
Badji	bacı	elder sister
Bektach	bektaş	member of the Bektashi Order
Belbey	bey	mister, gentlemen
Belbiaz	beyaz	white
Benchicha	ben şişe	[I am] a bottle
Benhadji	ben hacı	[I am] a Hadji
Benkara	ben Qāra	From Black Sea region in Anatolia
Bensari	ben sarı	[I am] blonde
Bentobal; Bentobbal	ben topal	[I am] crippled
Bermak	parmak	finger
Beiram; Biram	bayram	holiday, festival
Beyaz	beyaz	white
Bougara; Boulkara	bu kara	[this is] dark
Boukendjakdji	kancık	mean
Caliqus	çalıkuşu	goldcrest
Chalabi; Challabi	çelebi	educated person, gentlemen
Chelbi	çelebi	educated person, gentlemen
Cherouk	çürük	rotten
Dali; Dalibey; Dalisaus	deli	brave, crazy
Damir	demir	metal
Daouadji	davacı	litigant
Deramchi	diremci	currency
Djabali	çelebi	educated person, gentlemen
Doumaz	duymaz	deaf
Eski	eski	old
Gaba	kaba	rough, heavy
Goutchouk	küçük	small, little
Gueddjali	gacal	domestic
Guendez	gündüz	daytime
Guermezli	görmezli	blind
Guertali	kartal	eagle
Hadji	hacı	Hadji
Hidouk	haydut	bandit
Ioldach	yoldaş	companion, comrade
Kara	kara	dark
Karabadji	kara bacı	dark sister
Kardache	kardeş	brother
Karkach	karakaş	dark eyebrows
Kermaz	görmez	blind
Kerroudji	kurucu	founder, builder, veteran
Kertali	kartal	eagle
Koutchouk	küçük	small, little
Lalali; Lalili	laleli	tulip
Maldji	malcı	cattle producer
Mestandji	mestan	drunk
Oldach	yoldaş	companion, comrade
Oualan	oğlan	boy
Ouksel	yüksel	to succeed, achieve
Ourak	orak	sickle
Salakdji	salakça	silly
Salaouatchi; Salouatchi	salavatçaı	prayer
Sari	sarı	yellow or blond
Sarmachek	sarmaşık	vine
Sersar; Sersoub	serseri	layabout, vagrant
Tache	taş	stone, pebble
Tarakli	taraklı	having a comb, crested
Tchalabi	çelebi	educated person, gentlemen
Tchalikouche	çalıkuşu	goldcrest
Tenbel	tembel	lazy
Tobal; Toubal	topal	cripple
Yataghan; Yataghen	yatağan	yatagan
Yazli	yazılı	written
Yekkachedji	yakışmak	to suit
Yesli	yaslı	mourning
Yoldas	yoldaş	companion, comrade

== See also ==
- Algeria–Turkey relations
- List of Algerians of Turkish origin
- Kouloughli
- Ottoman Algeria
- Aïn El Turk
- List of Pashas and Deys of Algiers
- Turkish minorities in the former Ottoman Empire
  - Turks in Tunisia
  - Turks in Libya
  - Turks in the Arab world
  - Turks in the Balkans
  - Turkish Cypriots
- Turks in France

== Notes ==
a: "Kouloughlis" refers to the offspring (or descendants) of Turkish fathers and Algerian mothers.

== Bibliography ==
- Adamson, Fiona (2006), The Constitutive Power of Political Ideology: Nationalism and the Emergence of Corporate Agency in World Politics, University College London
- Adem, Ismail (2004), Küçük ve Orta Ölçekli İşletmeleri Geliştirme ve Destekleme Başkanlığı Cezayir Ülke Raporu (PDF), KOSGEB, archived from the original (PDF) on 2008-11-21.
- Appiah, Anthony; Gates, Henry Louis (2010), Encyclopedia of Africa, Volume 1, Oxford University Press, ISBN 978-0-19-533770-9.
- Bencheneb, Rachid (1971), "Les mémoires de Mahieddine Bachtarzi ou vingt ans de théâtre algérien", Revue de l'Occident musulman et de la Méditerranée, 9 (9): 15–20, doi:10.3406/remmm.1971.1098
- Benjamin, Roger (2004), "Orientalism, modernism and indigenous identity", in Edwards, Steve; Wood, Paul (eds.), Art of the Avant-Gardes, Yale University Press, ISBN 0-300-10230-5.
- Boyer, Pierre (1970), "Le problème Kouloughli dans la régence d'Alger", Revue de l'Occident musulman et de la Méditerranée, 8: 77–94, doi:10.3406/remmm.1970.1033
- Cheurfi, Achour (2001), La Classe Politique Algérienne (de 1900 à nos jours): Dictionnaire Biographique, University of Michigan, ISBN 9961-64-292-9.
- Communities and Local Government (2009), The Algerian Muslim Community in England: Understanding Muslim Ethnic Communities (PDF), Communities and Local Government, ISBN 978-1-4098-1169-5, archived from the original (PDF) on 2012-09-20.
- Déjeux, Jean (1984), Dictionnaire des Auteurs Maghrébins de Langue Française, KARTHALA Editions, ISBN 2-86537-085-2.
- Dokali, Rachid (1974), Les mosquées de la période Turque à Alger, University of Michigan: SNED, ASIN B0000EA150.
- Hizmetli, Sabri (1953), "Osmanlı Yönetimi Döneminde Tunus ve Cezayir'in Eğitim ve Kültür Tarihine Genel Bir Bakış" (PDF), Ankara Üniversitesi İlahiyat Fakültesi Dergisi, 32: 1–12
- McDougall, James (2006), History and the Culture of Nationalism in Algeria, Cambridge University Press, ISBN 0-521-84373-1.
- Oakes, Jonathan (2008), Bradt Travel Guide: Algeria, Bradt Travel Guides, ISBN 978-1841622323
- The Report: Algeria 2008, Oxford Business Group, 2008, ISBN 978-1-902339-09-2.
- Panzac, Daniel (2005), Barbary Corsairs: The End of a Legend, 1800-1820, BRILL, ISBN 90-04-12594-9.
- Parzymies, Anna (1985), Anthroponymie Algérienne: Noms de Famille Modernes d'origine Turque, Éditions scientifiques de Pologne, ISBN 83-01-03434-3.
- Rozet, Claude (1850), Algérie, Firmin-Didot.
- Ruedy, John Douglas (2005), Modern Algeria: The Origins and Development of a Nation, Indiana University Press, ISBN 0-253-21782-2.
- Saoud, R. (2004), The Impact of Islam on Urban Development in North Africa (PDF), Foundation for Science Technology and Cilisation, archived from the original on June 10, 2015.
- Shuval, Tal (2000), "The Ottoman Algerian Elite and Its Ideology", International Journal of Middle East Studies, 32 (3), Cambridge University Press: 323–344, doi:10.1017/s0020743800021127
- Shuval, Tal (2002), "Remettre l'Algérie à l'heure ottomane. Questions d'historiographie", Revue des mondes musulmans et de la Méditerranée (95–98): 423–448, doi:10.4000/remmm.244
- Stone, Martin (1997), The Agony of Algeria, C. Hurst & Co. Publishers, ISBN 1-85065-177-9.
- Tocqueville, Alexis de (2006), "Second Letter on Algeria (August 22, 1837)", in Bronner, Stephen Eric; Thompson, Michael (eds.), The Logos Reader: Rational Radicalism and the Future of Politics, University Press of Kentucky, ISBN 0813191483.
- Toussaint-Samat, Maguelonne (2009), "Coffee and Politics", A History of Food, John Wiley & Sons, ISBN 978-1-4443-0514-2.
- Turkish Embassy in Algeria (2008), Cezayir Ülke Raporu 2008, Ministry of Foreign Affairs.
- UNESCO (2009), Diversité et interculturalité en Algérie (PDF), UNESCO, archived from the original (PDF) on 2013-07-25.
