= El Hamadia District =

Coordinates: 35.979604°N 4.747467°E

- District
- Country: Algeria
- Province: Bordj Bou Arréridj Province
- Time zone: UTC+1 (CET)

El Hamadia District is a district of Bordj Bou Arréridj Province, Algeria.

== Municipalities ==
The district is further divided into 4 municipalities:

- El Hamadia
- El Ach
- Ksour
- Rabta
