= Chérifa =

Cherifa
- Also known as: Cherifa, Nna Čṛifa
- Born: Wardya Bucemlal; January 9, 1926; Aït Halla, El-Maïn, Algeria
- Died: March 13, 2014 (aged 88) Algiers, Algeria
- Occupation: Singer
- Instrument: Bendir

Ouardia Bouchemlal (Kabyle: Wardya Bucemlal or Nna Čṛifa, January 9, 1926 – March 13, 2014) was an Algerian female singer-songwriter, originally from Kabylia, who composed hundreds of songs during her more than 40 years of artistic life.

== Biography ==
Ouardia Bouchemlal was born on January 9, 1926, at Aït Halla, a small village located in the commune of El Main. Motherless, it is said she was under the tutelage of her uncles when her father remarried.

She debuted on stage in Algiers at the age of 16 years, interpreting traditional Kabyle songs. In 1942 Ouardia Bouchemlal, who would choose Cherifa as her artist name, made her debut on Radio Kabyle, as it was still called at that time. She would be one of the pioneers of this medium that would change the habits and attitudes by introducing singing and music at the heart of Kabyle homes. Cherifa was admitted within the female cast of the radio where the master Cheikh Nordine officiates, himself a singer and jack of all trades. At those times, it was still considered that women singing publicly were promiscuous. They were often forbidden by society and disowned by families. Her works were not reported to the Office of Copyrights, she therefore did not receive royalties on her compositions. In the 1970s, she will be even forced to do household chores to meet her needs. Her personal répertoire will be plundered and her songs covered without a penny paid over to her. In the early 1990s, she made a shy comeback and even performs in France. In 2001 she performed in two concerts in the United States with Naïma Ababsa and Zakia Kara Terki.

In 2008, the wilaya of Bordj Bou Arreridj and the Association Azel managed to bring N'Cherifa to her hometown after 65 years in exile. She is buried there.

== Songs ==
Throughout her career, Cherifa has composed over 800 songs.

- Abka Wala Khir Ay Akbou
- Aya Zerzour
- Azwaw (also rearranged and performed by Idir missing the original song)
- Sniwa d ifendjalen

== Bibliography ==
- Mahfoufi, Mehenna (2006). Chants de femmes en Kabylie (in French). Algiers: CNRPAH. p. 289.
- Parker Kitchell, Liza (1998). The development of Kabyle song during the twentieth century. Madison: University of Wisconsin–Madison. p. 324.

== Death ==
Cherifa died aged 88 on March 13, 2014.
