= Arab–Turkish relations =

Turkish-Arab relations may refer to:

- Arab League-Turkey relations
- Algeria–Turkey relations
- Egypt-Turkey relations
- Turkey-Morocco relations
- Libya-Turkey relations
- Iraqi-Turkish relations
- Turkish-Lebanese relations
- Kuwait-Turkey relations
- Palestine-Turkey relations
- Saudi Arabia-Turkey relations
- Syria-Turkey relations
- Turkey-United Arab Emirates relations
