= Bir Kasd Ali District =

Coordinates: 36°08′32″N 5°01′27″E

- District
- Interactive map of Bir Kasd Ali District
- Country: Algeria
- Province: Bordj Bou Arréridj Province
- Time zone: UTC+1 (CET)

Bir Kasd Ali District is a district of Bordj Bou Arréridj Province, Algeria.

== Municipalities ==
The district is further divided into 3 municipalities:

- Bir Kasdali
- Khelil
- Sidi Embarek
