= Aïn Taghrout District =

Coordinates: 36°07′53″N 5°04′41″E

- District
- Country: Algeria
- Province: Bordj Bou Arréridj Province
- Time zone: UTC+1 (CET)

Aïn Taghrout District is a district of Bordj Bou Arréridj Province, Algeria.

== Municipalities ==
The district is further divided into 2 municipalities:

- Aïn Taghrout
- Tixter
