= Ksour =

Ksour may refer to:

- Ksar (plural ksour), the North African Arabic term for "castle"
- Ksour Range, a mountain massif of the Saharan Atlas
- Ksour, Bordj Bou Arreridj, a town and commune in Bordj Bou Arréridj Province, Algeria
- Ksour Essef, a town and commune in the Mahdia Governorate, Tunisia
- Ain Ksour, a village in Aley District, Lebanon
- Ksour Festival, an annual festival organised in Tataouine, Tunisia
