= Mohamed Nadir Hamimid =

Algerian politician

- Born: January 1, 1945; Bordj Ghedir, Bordj Bou Arréridj, French Algeria
- Died: October 25, 2016 (aged 75); Algiers,Algeria
- Resting place: Sidi Fredj, Algiers Province, Algeria
- Occupation: Politician

Mohamed Nadir Hamimid (January 1, 1941 – October 25, 2016) was an Algerian politician. He served as the Algerian Minister of Housing and Urban Affairs from 2004 to 2008.
