= Ras El Oued District =

Coordinates: 35°56′59″N 5°02′09″E

- District
- Interactive map of Ras El Oued District
- Country: Algeria
- Province: Bordj Bou Arréridj Province
- Time zone: UTC+1 (CET)

Ras El Oued District is a district in Bordj Bou Arréridj Province, Algeria.

== Municipalities ==
The district is further divided into 3 municipalities:

- Ras El Oued
- Aïn Tesra
- Ouled Brahem
