= William Widenlocher =

French politician

William Widenlocher (9 November 1912 - 20 August 1991) was a French politician.

Widenlocher was born in Bordj Bou Arréridj, Algeria. He represented the French Section of the Workers' International (SFIO) in the National Assembly from 1958 to 1962.
