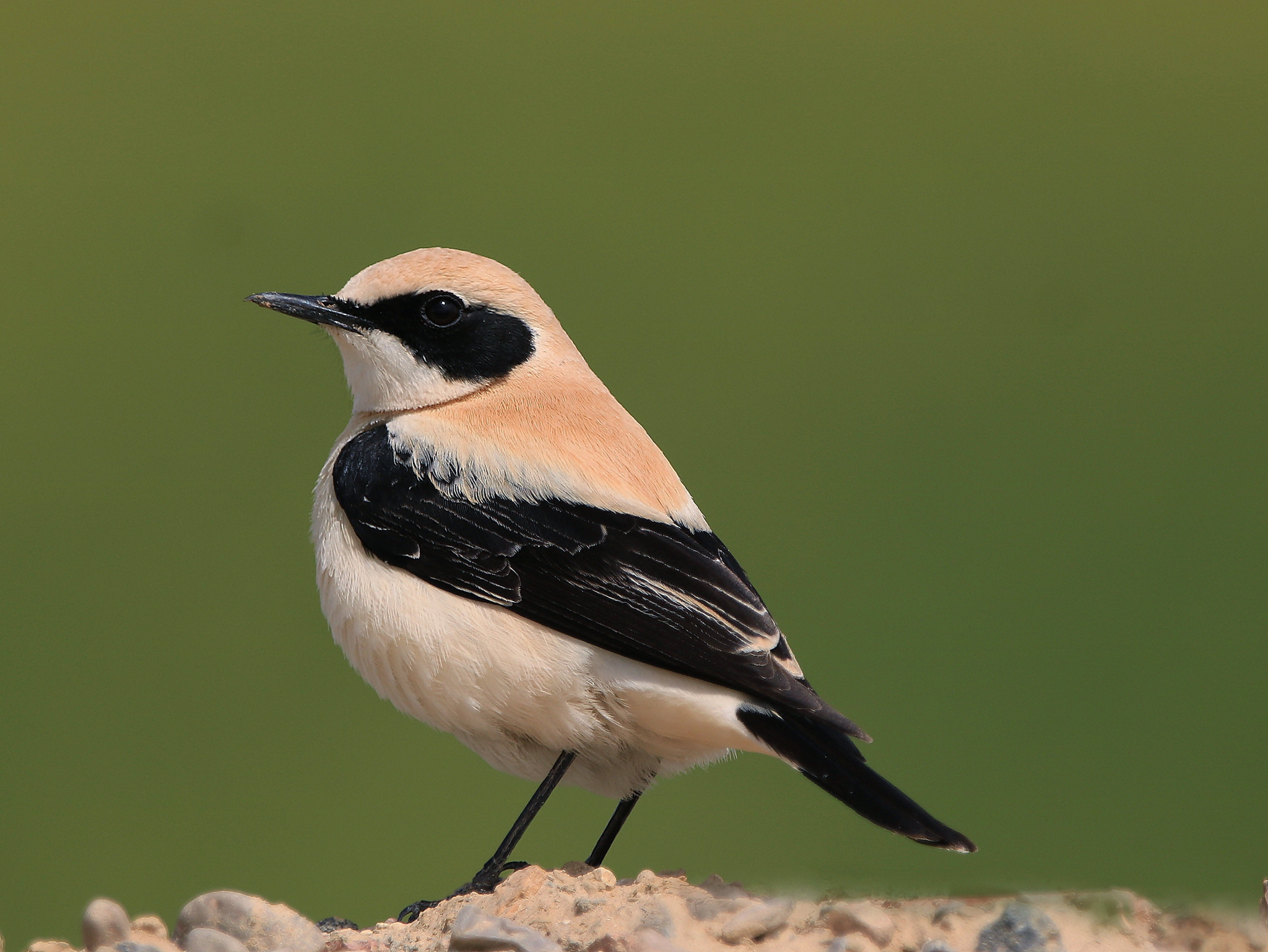
- Male in El Achir, Algeria

Conservation status
- Least Concern (IUCN 3.1)

Scientific classification
- Kingdom: Animalia
- Phylum: Chordata
- Class: Aves
- Order: Passeriformes
- Family: Muscicapidae
- Genus: Oenanthe
- Species: O. hispanica

Binomial name
- Oenanthe hispanica (Linnaeus, 1758)
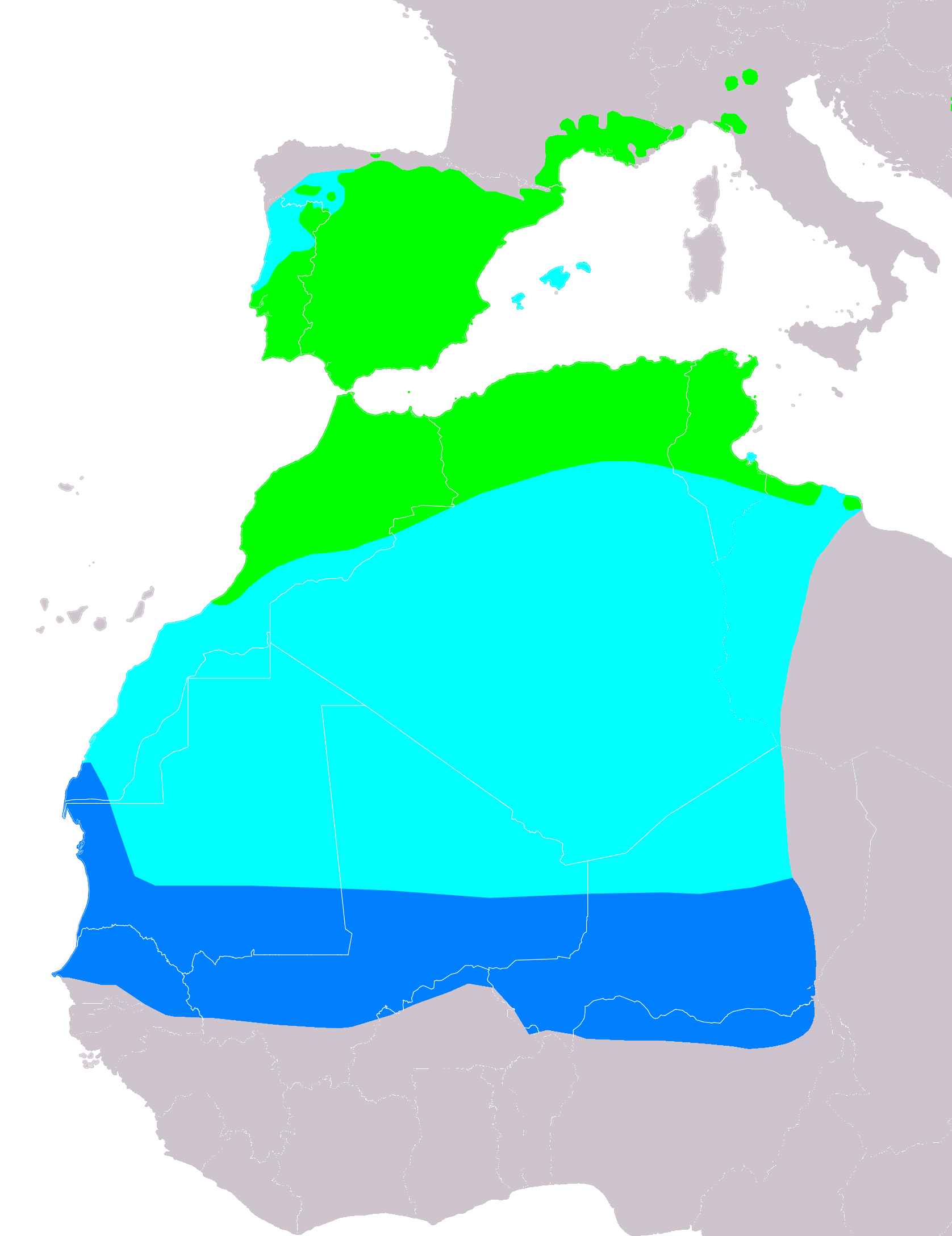
- Extant, breeding Extant, passage Extant, non-breeding

Synonyms
- Motacilla hispanica Linnaeus, 1758

= Western black-eared wheatear =

Species of bird

The western black-eared wheatear (Oenanthe hispanica) is a wheatear, a small migratory passerine bird that was formerly classed as a member of the thrush family Turdidae, but is now considered to be an Old World flycatcher (family Muscicapidae). It was formerly (and still is by some authorities) considered conspecific with the eastern black-eared wheatear.

== Description ==
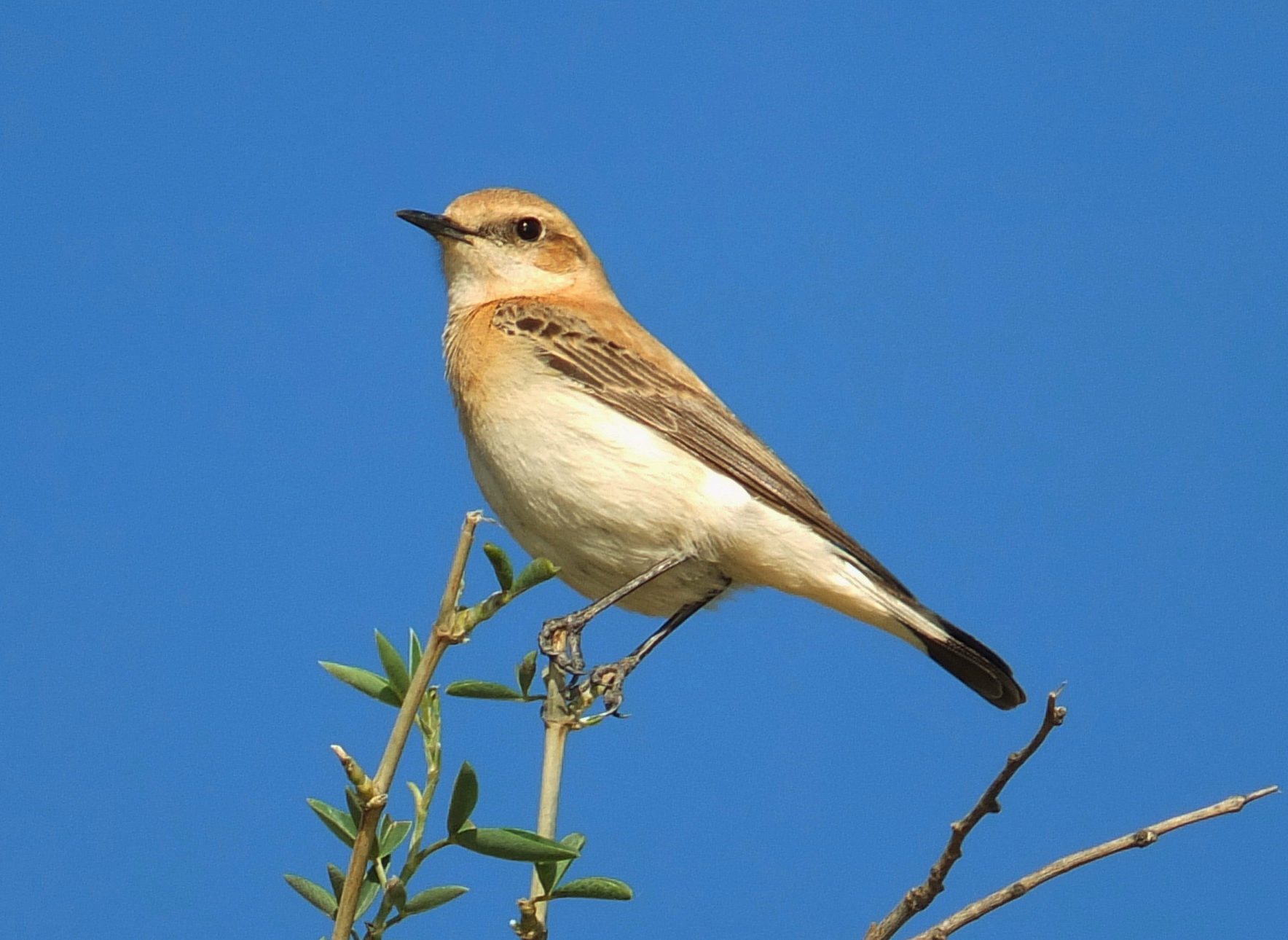
Female in Aïn Smara, Algeria

The breeding male has the forehead and crown white or nearly white, the mantle buff, and the wings blacker than those of the northern wheatear. The underparts are white tinged with buff. The back, upper tail coverts and most of the tail are white. A black mask extends from the ear coverts to the bill. The throat can be either black or white.

In autumn and winter the head and mantle are distinctly buff, as are the underparts (including the throat in non-black-throated individuals), but the buff varies in intensity. Except for the central pair, the tail feathers are much whiter than in the northern wheatear, the white on the inner web often extending to the tip.

The female is a browner bird, but has the characteristic white lower back, and her seasonal changes are less marked.

The male western black-eared wheatear can be distinguished from the male eastern black-eared wheatear by its more buff-tinged upperparts, giving it a less distinctly black-and-white appearance than the latter species, as well as having the black of the mask stopping at the base of the bill rather than extending slightly above. Black-throated individuals of this species have less black on the throat and face than on the eastern birds, and the black generally terminates less abruptly. Females of this species differ from their eastern counterparts in being warmer brown overall.

== Taxonomy ==
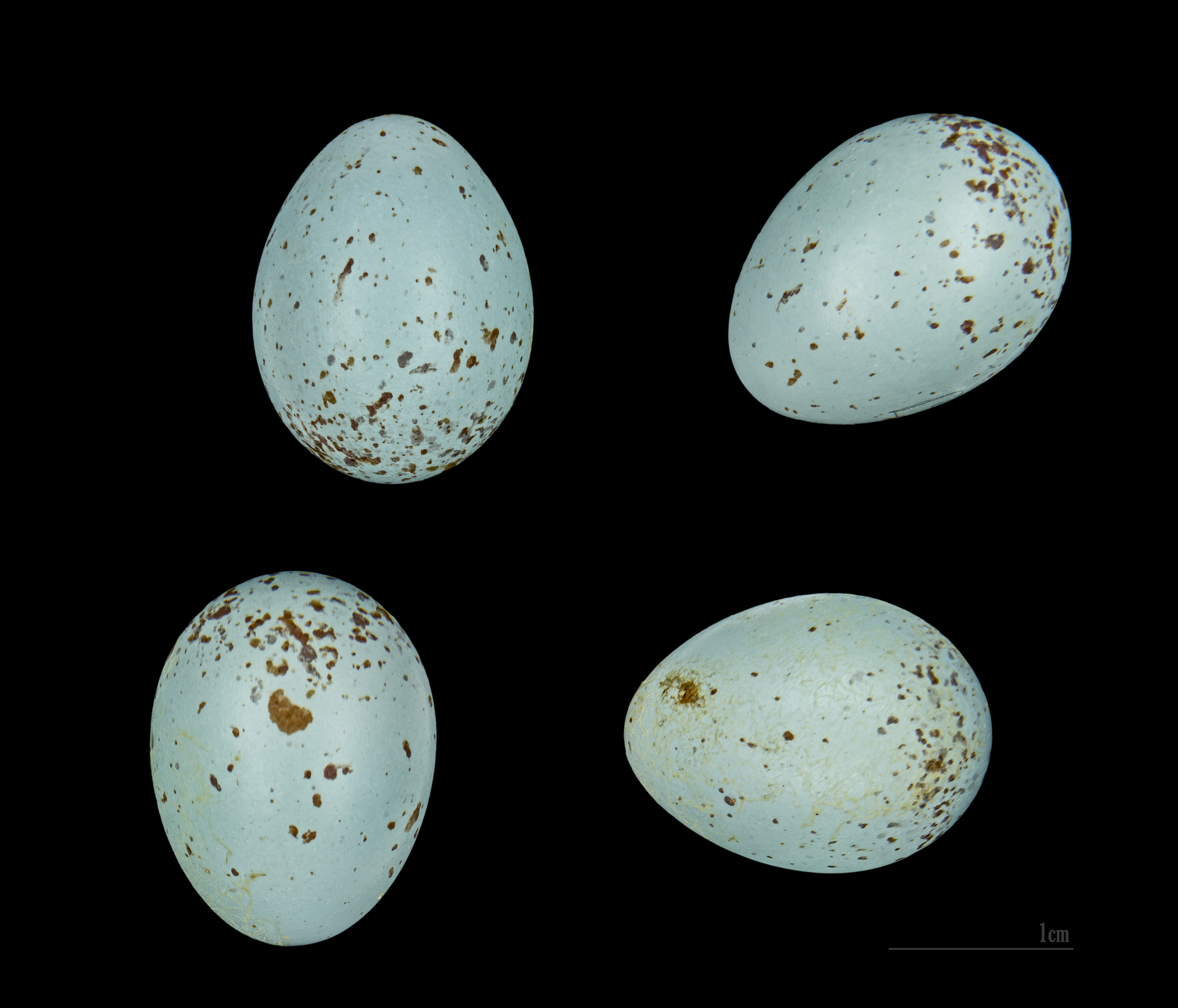
Oenanthe hispanica MHNT

In 1743 the English naturalist George Edwards included an illustration and a description of the western black-eared wheatear in his A Natural History of Uncommon Birds. He used the English name "The Red or Russet-colour'd Wheat-Ear". Edwards based his hand-coloured etching on a specimen owned by Mark Catesby that had been collected in Gibraltar. When in 1758 the Swedish naturalist Carl Linnaeus updated his Systema Naturae for the tenth edition, he placed the western black-eared wheatear with the wagtails in the genus Motacilla. Linnaeus included a brief description, coined the binomial name Motacilla hispanica and cited Edwards' work. The specific epithet is from the Latin Hispanicus meaning "Spanish". The western black-eared wheatear is now placed in the genus Oenanthe that was introduced in 1816 by the French ornithologist Louis Pierre Vieillot. The species is monotypic: no subspecies are recognised. The western black-eared wheatear was formerly considered to be conspecific with the eastern black-eared wheatear (Oenanthe melanoleuca). The species were split based on the results of a genetic study of the wheatears published in 2019.

The genus name Oenanthe is derived from the Ancient Greek oenos (οίνος) "wine" and anthos (ανθός) "flower". It refers to the northern wheatear's return to Greece in the spring just as the grapevines blossom. The specific hispanica is Latin for "Spanish". "Wheatear" is not derived from "wheat" or any sense of "ear", but is a 16th-century linguistic corruption of "white" and "arse", referring to the prominent white rump found in most species.
