= Achabou =

- Village
- Location within Algeria
- Coordinates: 36°19′30″N 4°43′10″E
- Country: Algeria
- Province: Bordj Bou Arréridj Province
- Time zone: UTC+1 (CET)

Achabou (Arabic: عشابو) is a village in the commune of Tafreg, in Bordj Bou Arréridj Province, northern Algeria.
