= Tassamert =

Tassamert Tesmart
- Commune and town
- Location within Algeria
- Coordinates: 36°16′09″N 4°49′23″E
- Country: Algeria
- Province: Bordj Bou Arréridj Province

Population (1998)
  - Total: 5,269
- Time zone: UTC+1 (CET)

Tesmart or Tassamert is a town and commune in Bordj Bou Arréridj Province, Algeria. It lies immediately west of Bordj Zemoura. According to the 1998 census it has a population of 5,269.
