= Mohamed Rafik Omar =

Algerian footballer (born 2004)

Personal information
- Full name: Mohamed Rafik Omar
- Date of birth: January 10, 2004 (age 22)
- Place of birth: Bordj Ghedir, Algeria
- Position: Winger

Team information
- Current team: Al-Shamal
- Number: 7

Youth career
- 2019–2022: AC FAF Khemis Miliana
- 2022–2023: Paradou AC

Senior career*
Years	Team	Apps	(Gls)
2023–	Al-Shamal	63	(16)

International career^{‡}
2021–	Algeria U20	6	(2)
- * Club domestic league appearances and goals as of October 17, 2026 ‡ National team caps and goals as of October 17, 2026

Mohamed Rafik Omar (born January 10, 2004 in Bordj Ghedir) is an Algerian footballer who plays for Al-Shamal SC in the Qatar Stars League.

== Career ==
In 2021, Omar was invited by Spanish club Real Valladolid to train with the club for two weeks.

In February 2023, Paradou AC announced the transfer of Omar to Qatari-club Al Shamal.
