= Teniet En-Nasr =

Coordinates: 36°13′53″N 4°36′04″E

- Commune and town
- Country: Algeria
- Province: Bordj Bou Arréridj Province

Population (1998)
  - Total: 6,808
- Time zone: UTC+1 (CET)

Teniet En-Nasr is a town and commune in Bordj Bou Arréridj Province, Algeria. According to the 1998 census it has a population of 6,808.

== History ==
Located 6 km south of Kalâa of Ait Abbas (Ait Aidel tribe), Teniet-el-Khemis was the first administrative center of the mixed commune of the Bibans, established by government decree on December 1, 1880, in the arrondissement of Sétif (Department of Constantine). The administrative seat of the Bibans mixed commune was moved on July 26, 1886, to Bordj Medjana, 11 km north of Bordj-Bou-Arreridj. This commune included within its territory the famous Iron Gates, which had long been a barrier to the eastward advance of the French army. Bachagha Mokrani led a revolt there in 1870 and 1871.

Teniet-el-Khemis became the administrative center of the new commune of Bougtone, established by decree on January 14, 1957. Then, by another decree on October 4, 1957, the commune of Teniet El Khemis was formed through the merger of the communes of Bougtone and Tafertast.

The commune of Teniet En Nasr is located 151 km from Algiers, 16 km from Ighil Ali, 12 km from Medjana, and 30 km from Bordj Bou Arréridj.
