= Condor Electronics =

Algerian company that manufactures and distributes consumer electronics

- Logo of Condor Electronics used since 2005.
- Native name: كوندور للإلكترونيات
- Type: Privately held company
- Industry: Electronics; Appliance manufacturing
- Founded: 9 February 2002; 24 years ago in Bordj Bou Arréridj, Algeria
- Founder: Abderahman Benhamadi
- Headquarters: ZAC Road of M'Sila, 34000 Bordj Bou Arréridj, Algeria
- Number of locations: 143 stores (2018)
- Area served: Africa/North Africa; Europe; Asia
- Products: Smartphones; Televisions; Laptops; Household Appliances
- Number of employees: 4 200 (2020)
- Website: condor.dz

Condor Electronics is an Algerian company that manufactures and distributes consumer electronics. Founded in 2002, the company is headquartered in Bordj Bou Arréridj, Algeria. Condor Electronics sells its products throughout the world

Beyond selling its various products on the Algerian market, where the company is a leader with a 35% market share in home appliances and 55% in mobile phones, Condor aims for an 80% export rate of its production to 35 countries (including France, Jordan, Mauritania, Benin, Senegal,). Primarily focused on consumers, the company has also expanded into B2B solutions such as lighting for large infrastructures and centralized climate control.

Condor regularly participates in trade shows for information technology and electronics in general, such as CeBIT, IFA, and MWC.

== History and growth ==
Condor Electronics, a subsidiary of the Benhamadi Group, was established in 2002, specializing in electronics and home appliances.

By 2012, Condor Electronics announced it had captured 35% of the Algerian market for computers and home appliances. In 2013, marking its 10th year of operation, Condor reported that exports to Tunisia and Jordan had generated approximately five million euros, boosting its turnover by 25%.

In June 2013, the company launched its first smartphone, the Condor C-1, followed by the more powerful C-4 in September of the same year. The C-6, a high-end smartphone, was released in April 2014. This was followed by the C-8 and the C-4+ in various colors. In 2014, Condor allocated $100 million to investments, and its profit margin increased between 20% and 40%.

In June 2015, after declaring its intention to enter the European market, Condor announced that 30,000 units of its new smartphone, the Griffe W1, had been sold in France. According to Jeune Afrique's ranking of the 500 largest African companies in 2015, Condor ranked 15th among Algerian companies and 281st overall in Africa. That same year, the company's turnover reached 93 billion dinars.

In January 2017, Condor became the first manufacturer in Africa and the MENA region to develop 8K technology. On 20 April 2017, Condor opened its first showroom in Tunisia.

In February 2018, at the MWC 2018, Condor Electronics' African market director announced that the company was expanding its presence in Europe, particularly in France, with the Allure M3 smartphone as its flagship product.

However, in August 2019, Condor's CEO, Abderrahmane Benhamadi, was placed in pre-trial detention following a corruption investigation. He was temporarily released in April 2020 but was later sentenced to four years in prison, with two years suspended, for illegal contracts and obtaining undue advantages.

== Activities ==
Condor offers a variety of mobile devices, ranging from high-end smartphones to entry-level feature phones. In February 2016, Condor launched the Unique U1, a flip phone with two screens, running on the Android KitKat operating system and primarily targeting a female audience. Condor Electronics also offers a range of touchscreen tablets. Typically targeting the general public, Condor launched a dedicated tablet for children in June 2015, called the Tab Kids (model TGW-709).
