= Ait Aidel =

Ait Aidel At Ɛidel
- Kabyle confederation
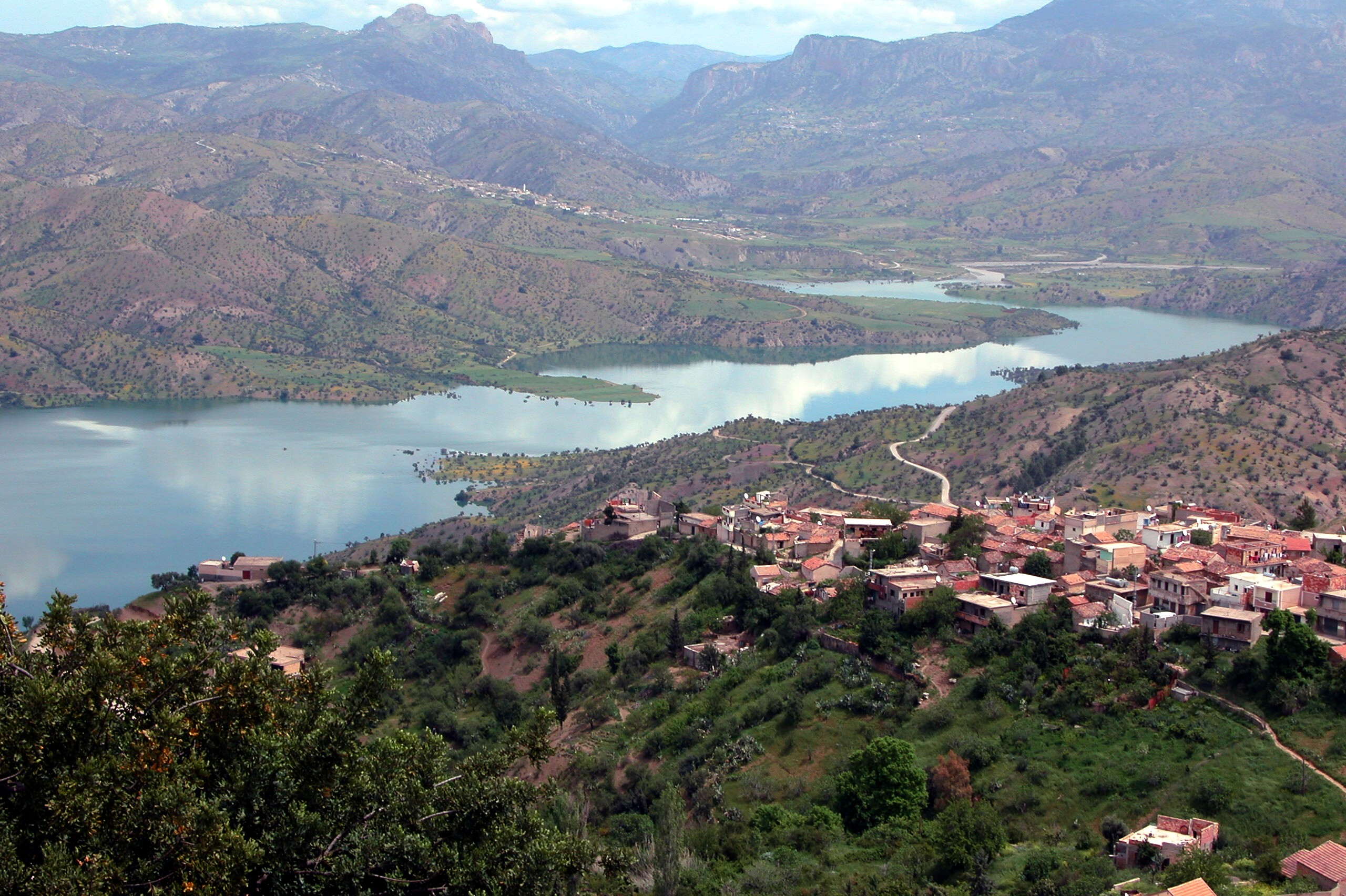
- Tamokra, village of the Ait Aidel
- Ethnicity: Kabyles
- Location: Soummam valley
- Branches: Ait Oumalou; Ait Nouh; Bouhamza; Imsissen; Mahfouda; Seddouk
- Language: Kabyle (Taɛidelt var.)
- Religion: Islam

The Ait Aidel (Kabyle: At Ɛidel) are a Kabyle confederation located in between the Babors and the Bibans, in the Soummam valley.

== Socio-political organization ==
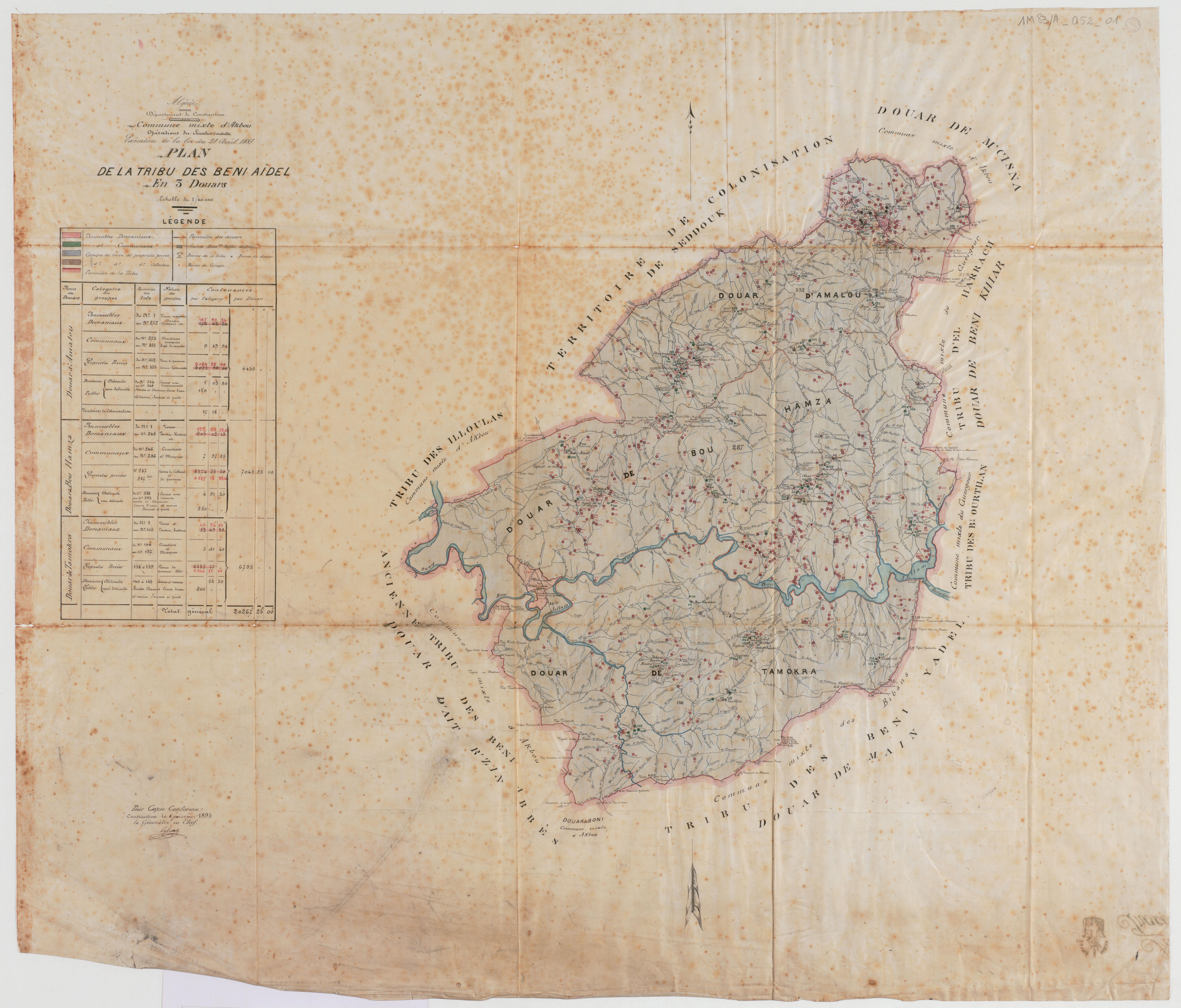
Map of the Ait Aidel, without the land expropriated during the French colonization

The confederation is composed of six fractions which are the following:

- Ait Nouh (It Nuḥ): villages of Boukerdous, Bicher, Boutouab, Tassira, Toufirt, Tamokra, Taourirt n'Tizi Aidel and Tizi Aidel
- Mahfouda (Imeḥfuḍen): Mahfouda
- Bouhamza (Ibuḥemzawiyen): Bouhamza, Taourirt, Tachouaft, Tansaout
- Ait Oumalou (At Umalu): Amalou, Toudert, Ighil n'Tala, Bouhithem, Ighil Igueni, Timessririne, Takhelicht Ichaachouaen, Tala Abdellah, Tizi Ouzrou, Ait Brahem
- Seddouk (Isedduqiyen): Seddouk Ouadda, Seddouk Oufella, Tibouamouchine, Ighil n'Djebbar
- Imsisen: Takaatz, Zounina, Amagaz, Tighermin, Ighi Ouantar, Ighil Melloulen

== History ==
In 1871, a "Holy War" was declared to the French Colonial Empire by Cheikh El Haddad from Seddouk.

== Culture ==
The Ait Aidel speak the central western Kabyle dialect, also spoken by the Ait Waghlis and the Ait Khiar. Their variant is called Taɛidelt and is characterized by the replacement of the letter "g" by the letter "y".

== Notable people ==
- Cheikh El Haddad
- Abderrahmane Farès
- Mohamed Chalali
- Raïs M'Bolhi (half)
