= Aïn Tesra =

- Commune and town

- Location within Algeria
- Country: Algeria
- Province: Bordj Bou Arréridj Province

Population (1998)
  - Total: 9,358
- Time zone: UTC+1 (CET)

Aïn Tesra is a town and commune in Bordj Bou Arréridj Province, Algeria. At the time of the 2008 census, it had a population of 9,570.
