= Medjana =

- Commune and town
- Location of Medjana, Algeria within Bordj Bou Arréridj Province

- Location of Medjana within Algeria
- Coordinates: 36°08′N 4°40′E
- Country: Algeria
- Province: Bordj Bou Arréridj Province

Population (1998)
  - Total: 16,112
- Time zone: UTC+1 (CET)

Medjana is a town and commune (municipality) in Bordj Bou Arréridj Province, Algeria. It is the (approximate) location the ancient city and bishopric of Vardimissa, which remains a Latin Catholic titular see.

According to the 1998 census it has a population of 16,112.

== History ==
Vardimissa (also spelled B- as n Greek) was important enough in the Roman province of Mauretania Caesariensis to become one of its many suffragan dioceses, but like most, faded completely, probably at the 7th century advent of Islam.

Two of its bishops are historically documented :

- Victor, participant at the Council of Carthage in 411, among the Catholic bishops confronted with Donatist heretical counterparts, without such for his see.
- Burcus, intervening Catholic participant at the Council of Carthage in 484 called by king Huneric of the Vandal Kingdom, presumably exiled or executed afterward.

== Titular see ==
The diocese was nominally restored in 1933 as Latin titular bishopric of Vardimissa (Latin = Curiate Italian) / Vardimissen(sis) (Latin adjective).

It is vacant, having had the following incumbents, so far of the fitting Episcopal (lowest) rank :

- José Freire Falcão (1967.04.24 – 1967.08.19) as Coadjutor Bishop of Limoeiro do Norte (Brazil) (1967.04.24 – 1967.08.19); later Bishop of Limoeiro do Norte (1967.08.19 – 1971.11.25), Metropolitan Archbishop of Teresina (Brazil) (1971.11.25 – 1984.02.15), Metropolitan Archbishop of Brasília (Brazil) (1984.02.15 – retired 2004.01.28), Second Vice-President of Latin American Episcopal Council (1987 – 1991), created Cardinal-Priest of S. Luca a Via Prenestina (1988.06.28 – ...)
- Bruno-Augustin Hippel, Pallotines (S.A.C.) (1968.10.02 – death 1970.11.07) as emeritate; previously Titular Bishop of Abora (1948.12.09 – 1951.01.11) as first and last Apostolic Vicar of Oudtshoorn (South Africa) (1948.12.09 – 1951.01.11), (see) promoted first Bishop of Oudtshoorn (1951.01.11 – retired 1968.10.02)
- Alano Maria Pena, Dominican Order (O.P.) (1975.04.07 – 1978.05.26) as Auxiliary Bishop of Belém do Pará (Brazil) (1975.04.07 – 1976.07.14), Coadjutor Bishop-Prelate of Territorial Prelature of Marabá (Brazil) (1976.07.14 – 1976.11.10) and succeeding as last Bishop-Prelate of Marabá (1976.11.10 – 1979.10.16); later (see) promoted first Bishop of Marabá (Brazil) (1979.10.16 – 1985.07.11), Bishop of Itapeva (Brazil) (1985.07.11 – 1993.11.24), Bishop of Nova Friburgo (Brazil) (1993.11.24 – 2003.09.24), Metropolitan Archbishop of Niterói (Brazil) (2003.09.24 – retired 2011.11.30)
- Alfredo Ernest Novak, Redemptorists (C.SS.R.) (born USA) (1979.04.19 – 1989.03.15) as Auxiliary Bishop of Archdiocese of São Paulo (Brazil) (1979.04.19 – 1989.03.15); later Bishop of Paranaguá (Brazil) (1989.03.15 – retired 2006.08.02), died 2014
- Jan Martyniak (1989.07.20 – 1991.01.16) as Auxiliary Bishop of Przemyśl of the Ukrainians (Poland) (1989.07.20 – 1991.01.16); next succeeded as last suffragan Eparch (Bishop) of Przemyśl of the Ukrainians (1991.01.16 – 1996.05.24), (see) promoted as first Metropolitan Archbishop of restyled Przemyśl–Warszawa of the Ukrainians (1996.05.24 – retired 2015.11.07)
- Diómedes Espinal de León (2000.04.20 – 2006.05.24) as Auxiliary Bishop of Archdiocese of Santiago de los Caballeros (Dominican Republic) (2000.04.20 – 2006.05.24); next Bishop of Mao–Monte Cristi (Dominican Republic) (2006.05.24 – ...)
- Mosè Marcia (2006.06.03 – 2011.04.21) as Auxiliary Bishop of Archdiocese of Cagliari (Sardinia, Italy) (2006.06.03 – 2011.04.21); later Bishop of Nuoro (Italy) (2011.04.21 – ...).

== See also ==
- List of Catholic dioceses in Algeria

== Sources and external links ==
- GCatholic

Bibliography - ecclesiastical history

- Pius Bonifacius Gams, Series episcoporum Ecclesiae Catholicae, Leipzig 1931, p. 469
- Stefano Antonio Morcelli, Africa christiana, Volume I, Brescia 1816, p. 347
- Auguste Audollent, lemma 'Bartimisiensis' in Dictionnaire d'Histoire et de Géographie ecclésiastiques, vol. VI, 1932, coll. 1042-1043
