= Djaafra =

- Commune and town
- Location within Algeria
- Country: Algeria
- Province: Bordj Bou Arréridj Province

Population (1998)
  - Total: 9,699
- Time zone: UTC+1 (CET)

Djaafra is a town and commune in Bordj Bou Arréridj Province, Algeria. It had a population of 9,699 according to the 1998 census.
