= Khelil, Algeria =

Coordinates: 36°10′32″N 5°01′45″E

Khelil خليل (Arabic)
- Commune and town
- Interactive map of Khelil
- Country: Algeria
- Province: Bordj Bou Arréridj Province

Population (1998)
  - Total: 23,537
- Time zone: UTC+1 (CET)

Khelil is a town and commune in Bordj Bou Arréridj Province in Hautes Plaines area, Algeria. According to the 1998 census it has a population of 23,537.
