= Algeria–Turkey relations =

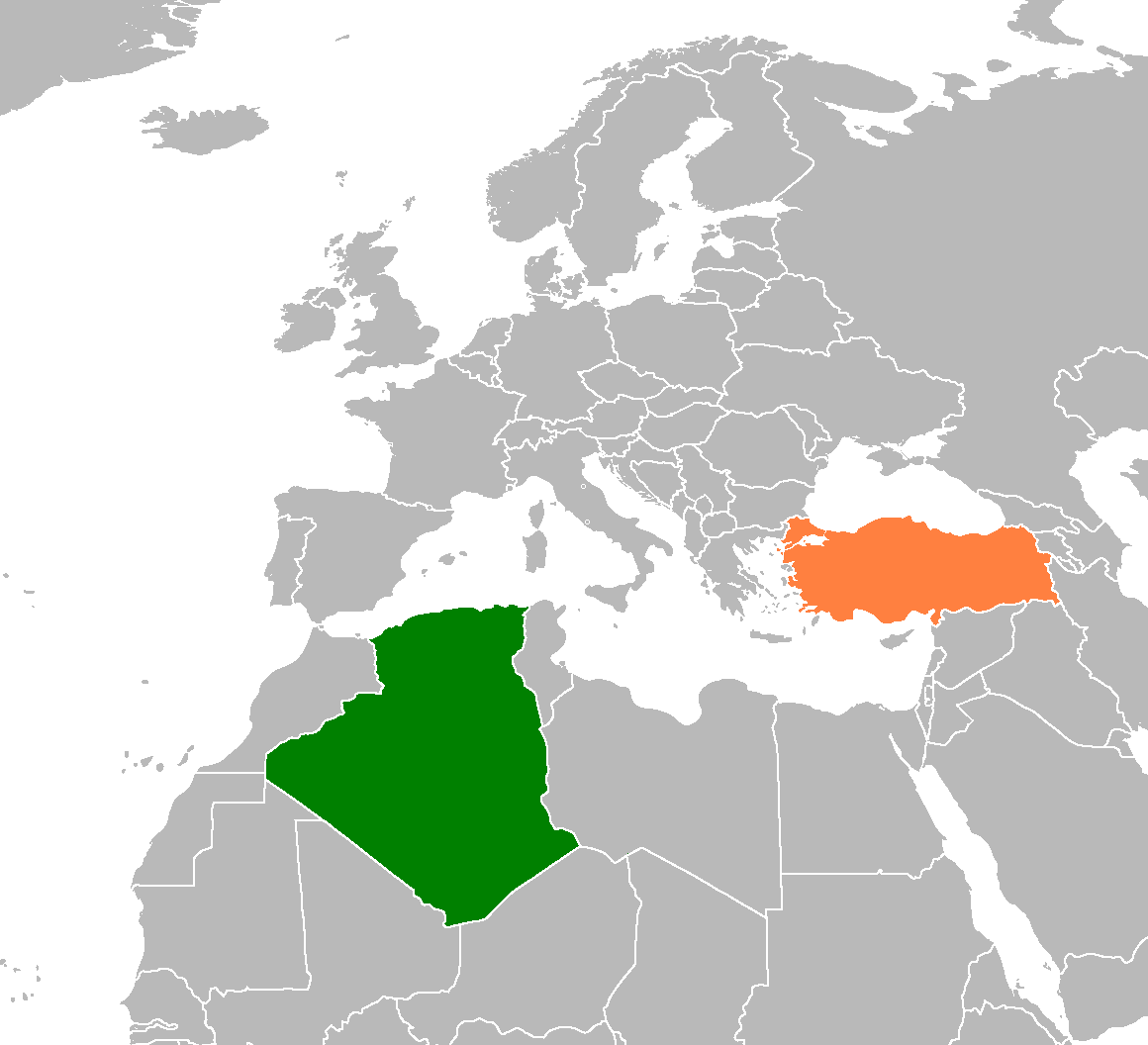
- Algeria: Turkey

Diplomatic mission
- Algerian embassy, Ankara: Turkish embassy, Algiers

Algeria–Turkey relations refers to the diplomatic relations between Turkey and Algeria. Algeria has an embassy in Ankara and a general consulate in Istanbul. Turkey has an embassy in Algiers. Both countries are full members of the Union for the Mediterranean and the Organisation of Islamic Cooperation.

== History ==
Up from 16th century until 1830, northern Algeria was part of the Ottoman Empire, then known as Ottoman Algeria. Algiers was one of the eyalets and possessed a significant degree of political autonomy.

In 2017, one of the symbols for the 500-year old friendship between Turkey and Algeria, the Ketchaoua Mosque in Algiers, was restored with Turkish funds. Restoration was one of the projects related to the "Friendship and Cooperation Agreement" signed during Prime Minister of Turkey Recep Tayyip Erdoğan's visit to Algeria in 2006.

History has been key to the discourse regarding the Algeria–Turkey relations. The Turkish Ministry of Foreign Affairs describes it as: "Turkey and Algeria share common history as well as deep-rooted cultural and brotherly ties." In order to consolidate relations between the two countries, a cultural and historical symposium was organized in 2017. During the meeting, Algerian Minister of Culture Azzedine Mihoubi said "We need to increase the number of such activities on our common history and look more into our history belonging to the Ottoman period".

== Modern relations ==
=== Algerian War ===
Until the 1960 Turkish coup d'état, Turkey supported France in UN votes since they were NATO allies. Turkey first voted unfavorable (1955) and then abstained (1958) in the voting on Algeria's independence at the UN. The main reason to that, was Turkey's aim to get closer with France and favouring Algerian Independence would negatively affect France–Turkey relations. However, this decision of Turkish officials was later critiqued as propensity for shorttermism and damaged bilateral relations.

During a visit by President Süleyman Demirel to Algeria in 1999, it was uncovered that the first covert military aid from Turkey to Algeria occurred in 1957. The Turkish foreign policy after 1960 was favorable towards the Algerian cause. On July 31, 1960, Prime Minister Cemal Gürsel said: "I have been following with close interest the noble and heroic struggles of the Algerians for a long time." On September 16, 1960, some members of the National Unity Committee issued a statement declaring their support for the Algerian Liberation Movement. In a 1995 interview, Alparslan Türkeş said that Turkey sent Algeria 20 thousand rifles and 200 cannons since "Algeria was from the former Ottoman province and its people were Muslims. It was also natural to expect support from Muslim countries. However, the expected support was not given at the time of the Democrat Party. Algerians maintained their contacts with the world mostly through Libyan embassies. The Revolutionary government contacted the Algerian Liberation Movement through the Libyan embassy in Ankara. The Algerian delegation of three, including a lady, came to Ankara. Türkeş met with the delegation. The delegation requested ammunition from Turkey. Türkeş promised to send a large amount of ammunition. The weapons were sent to Libya by ship, and from there to the Algerian Liberation Movement." Algeria–Turkey relations began to normalize after the then Prime Minister Turgut Özal, who visited Algeria in 1985, apologized to Algeria for Turkey's stance in the UN votes in the 1950s.

=== Normalization (1985-present) ===
First step to restore the situation was taken by then Prime Minister of Turkey Turgut Özal. He visited Algeria in 1985 and explicitly apologized for Turkey's unfavorable voting. Following year, Algerian Prime Minister Abdelhamid Brahimi paid a visit (first official Algerian visit to Turkey) and signed an oil trade deal with Turkey.

In the 1990s, both Algeria and Turkey had similar secular military and Islamist tensions. The Algerian military's intervention led to the repression of FIS and the subsequent Algerian Civil War in 1992 and the Turkish military forced the resignation of the Erbakan government and the banned the Welfare Party. Since the tensions between the military and the Islamist party led to a civil war in Algeria, Necmettin Erbakan said "Turkey will not turn into Algeria" in 1992 and 1997. But on May 10, 1997 Welfare Party Şanlıurfa MP İbrahim Halil Çelik threatened that "If you try to close the İmam Hatip schools under the RP government, blood will be spilled. It would be worse than Algeria." Erbakan and his associates developed ties with FIS and when Erbakan visited the American Muslim Council in October 1994, he engaged with FIS representatives.

In 1999, Turkish President Süleyman Demirel stated that negative connotations of Turkey's abstaining vote in 1958 are totally erased. Algerian President Abdelaziz Bouteflika paid a visit to Turkey in 2005. Mutual visits have been a turning point to strengthen bilateral relations as well as reviving friendship between the countries."

Algeria is a very important partner of Turkey in the Arab world, in Africa and in the Islamic world overall, although Algeria is an important partner of Iran as well. In fact, Algeria was one of the countries that abstained from voting on a 2012 UN draft resolution condemning human rights violations by the Assad regime which is supported by Iran. Iranian officials have also previously underlined that Iran and Algeria have the capacity to create a new world order. Aware of this situation, Turkey seems determined not to leave its potential African partners in the hands of rival regional and global powers. Therefore, In 2013, Prime Minister of Turkey Recep Tayyip Erdoğan paid a visit to Algeria and met Algerian President Abdelaziz Bouteflika in Algiers. Increasing cooperations, both economic, political and security, were placed.

=== Economy ===
"We see Algeria as an island of political and economic stability in the region. Our first trading partner in Africa is Algeria." said Turkish President Erdoğan and he added: "Therefore, around one thousand Turkish firms are in Algeria carrying on businesses with an investment volume of 3.5 billion dollars." Algeria is Turkey's 23rd largest export market and 25th largest supplier of goods imports with a total trade volume of 4.5 billion while Turkey is Algeria's 6th biggest economic partner. Algeria's most exported good to Turkey is oil hydrocarbons and natural gas. Algeria imports construction material the most from Turkey. Algeria is the 4th biggest natural gas supplier of Turkey with %8 percent of the share.

At the end of June 2024 it was officially announced that in 2023 trade between Algeria and Turkey reached a new peak with $6.3 billion. The Algerian and Turkish presidents say they want to reach $10 billion in trade between the two nations. In 2018, trade between the two countries was only 3.5 billion. Otherwise in 2024 around 1,500 Turkish companies operate in Algeria. The total investment volume of these companies exceeded $6 billion, and Turkish construction companies have so far implemented 636 projects worth $21.3 billion in Algeria.

=== Security ===
In 2003, Turkish-Algerian ministers signed a security memo against drug, human trafficking and organized crimes. Both sides described terrorism as a significant problem and discussed uniting struggles against such groups and organizations. By the October of the same year, a military cooperation agreement was framed. The agreement included clauses such as technology transfer, common military drills and exchange of military information. Turkey, as a NATO member, plays a significant role on the thawing relations between the group and Algeria, due to the importance of Algeria for the regional security of Africa and MENA. Turkey is also becoming an increasingly important weapon exporter to Algeria and military cooperation between the two countries is growing as well, given the reputation of Algerian People's National Armed Forces as one of the most well-trained, battle-hardened and professional African militaries.

== State visits ==
From Algeria to Turkey:

Dates	Head of State	Ref.
April 1986	Prime Minister Abdelhamid Brahimi	
February 2–4, 2005	President Abdelaziz Bouteflika	
December 21, 2021	Prime minister Aymen Benabderrahmane	
May 15–18, 2022	President Abdelmadjid Tebboune	

From Turkey to Algeria:

Dates	Head of State	Ref.
February 4–6, 1985	Prime Minister Turgut Özal	
January 17–20, 1988	President Kenan Evren	
January 25–26, 1999	President Süleyman Demirel	
May 22–23, 2006	Prime Minister Recep Tayyip Erdoğan	
June 4–5, 2013	Prime Minister Recep Tayyip Erdoğan	
November 19–20, 2014	President Recep Tayyip Erdoğan	
February 26–27, 2018	President Recep Tayyip Erdoğan	

== See also ==
- Turks in Algeria
- Foreign relations of Algeria
- Foreign relations of Turkey
- Regency of Algiers
