= Haraza =

Coordinates: 36°09′23″N 4°13′24″E

- Commune and town
- Interactive map of Haraza
- Country: Algeria
- Province: Bordj Bou Arréridj Province

Population (1998)
  - Total: 5,707
- Time zone: UTC+1 (CET)

Haraza is a town and commune in Bordj Bou Arréridj Province, Algeria. According to the 1998 census it has a population of 5,707.
