= El Hamadia =

Coordinates: 35°59′N 4°45′E

- Commune and town
- Country: Algeria
- Province: Bordj Bou Arréridj Province

Population (1998)
  - Total: 20,635
- Time zone: UTC+1 (CET)

El Hamadia is a town and commune in Bordj Bou Arréridj Province, Algeria. According to the 1998 census it has a population of 20,635.
