= Bordj Bou Arréridj District =

Bordj Bou Arreridj District
- District
- Country: Algeria
- Province: Bordj Bou Arréridj Province
- Capital: Bordj Bou Arreridj

Area
  - Total: 31 sq mi (81 km^{2})

Population (2008)
  - Total: 168,346
  - Density: 5,380/sq mi (2,078/km^{2})
- Time zone: UTC+1 (CET)

The Bordj Bou Arreridj district is an Algerian administrative district in the Bordj Bou Arreridj province. Its chief town is located on the eponymous town of Bordj Bou Arreridj.

== Location ==
The Bordj Bou Arreridj district is located in the center of the Bordj Bou Arreridj province.

== Communes ==
The district is composed of only one commune: Bordj Bou Arreridj.
