= Aïn Taghrout =

- Commune and town

- Location within Algeria
- Country: Algeria
- Province: Bordj Bou Arréridj Province

Population (1998)
  - Total: 11,103
- Time zone: UTC+1 (CET)

Aïn Taghrout is a town and commune in Bordj Bou Arréridj Province, Algeria. According to the 1998 census, it has a population of 11,103.
