= El M'hir =

- Commune and town
- Location of El M'hir, Algeria within Bordj Bou Arréridj Province

- Location of El M'hir within Algeria
- Coordinates: 36°07′06″N 4°23′02″E
- Country: Algeria
- Province: Bordj Bou Arréridj Province

Population (1998)
  - Total: 15,160
- Time zone: UTC+1 (CET)

El M'hir (Arabic: المهير) is a town and commune in Bordj Bou Arréridj Province, Algeria. According to the 1998 census it has a population of 15,160.
