= Ben Daoud =

- Commune and town
- Country: Algeria
- Province: Bordj Bou Arréridj Province

Population (1998)
  - Total: 13,472
- Time zone: UTC+1 (CET)

Ben Daoud is a town and commune in Bordj Bou Arréridj Province, Algeria. According to the 1998 census it has a population of 13,472.
