= Rabta =

Coordinates: 35°55′N 4°45′E

- Commune and town
- Interactive map of Rabta
- Country: Algeria
- Province: Bordj Bou Arréridj Province

Population (1998)
  - Total: 10,529
- Time zone: UTC+1 (CET)

Rabta is a town and commune in Bordj Bou Arréridj Province, Algeria. According to the 1998 census it has a population of 10,529.
