= Bir Kasdali =

- Commune and town
- Location within Algeria
- Country: Algeria
- Province: Bordj Bou Arréridj Province

Population (2010)
  - Total: 19,622
- Time zone: UTC+1 (CET)

Bir Kasdali is a town and commune in Bordj Bou Arréridj Province, Algeria. It is located between Bordj Bou Arreridj and Sétif. It is a Daira, has a Khelil and Sidi Embarek. According to the 2010 census it has a population of 19,622.
