= Ouled Brahem =

Coordinates: 35°52′20″N 5°04′29″E

- Commune and town
- Interactive map of Ouled Brahem
- Country: Algeria
- Province: Bordj Bou Arréridj Province

Population (1998)
  - Total: 7,348
- Time zone: UTC+1 (CET)

Ouled Brahem is a town and commune in Bordj Bou Arréridj Province, Algeria. According to the 1998 census it has a population of 7,348.
