= Tamokra =

Tamokra Ṭamuqqṛa (Kabyle)
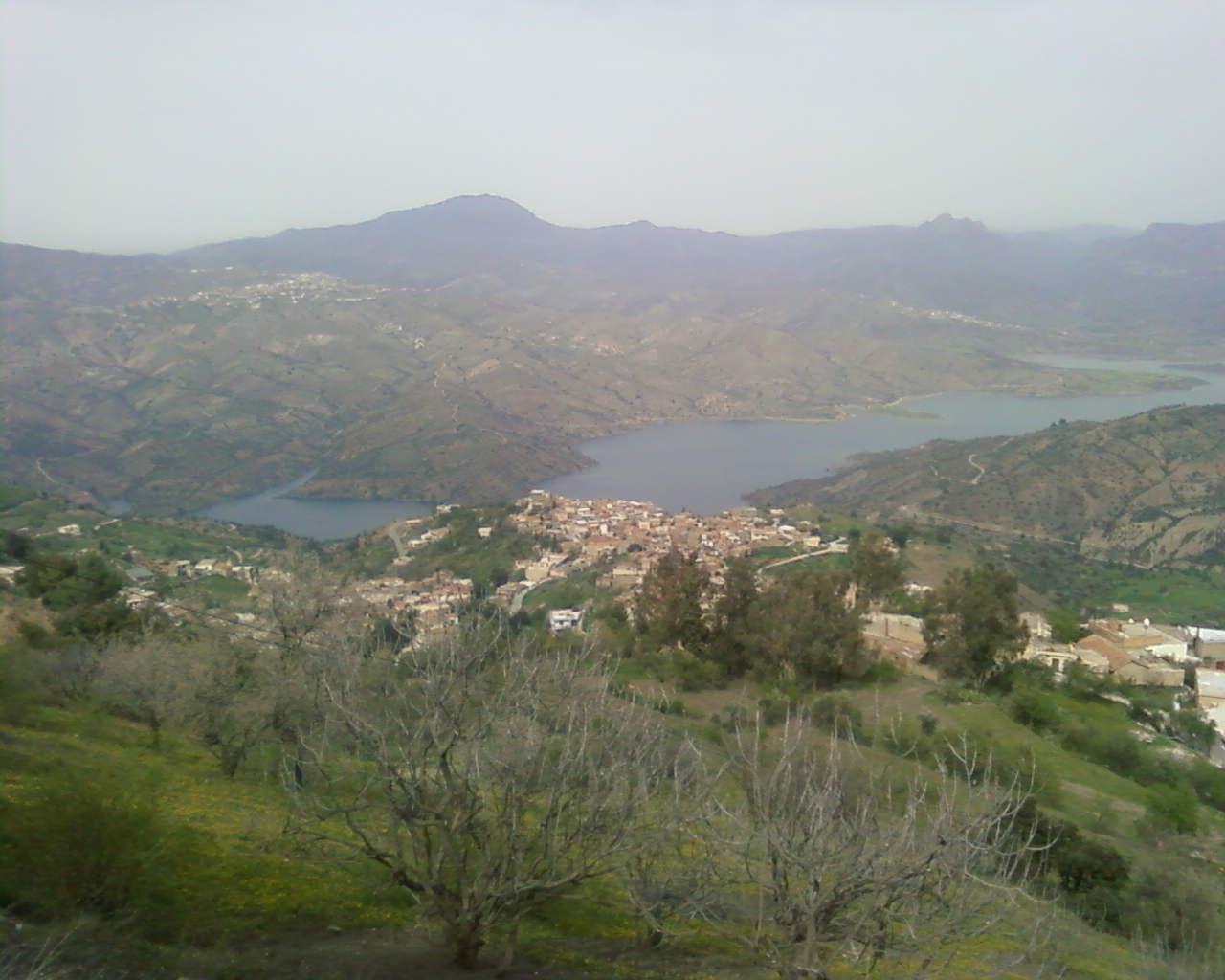

- Location within Algeria
- Coordinates: 36°24′N 4°40′E
- Country: Algeria
- Province: Béjaïa
- Time zone: UTC+1 (West Africa Time)

Tamokra (Kabyle: Ṭamuqqṛa) is a town of northern Algeria located in the Béjaïa Province, in Kabylia.
