= El Ach =

- Commune and town
- Location within Algeria
- Country: Algeria
- Province: Bordj Bou Arréridj Province

Population (1998)
  - Total: 16,108
- Time zone: UTC+1 (CET)

El Ach is a town and commune in Bordj Bou Arréridj Province, Algeria. According to the 1998 census it has a population of 16,108.
