= Ghilassa =

Coordinates: 35°52′18″N 4°54′23″E

- Commune and town
- Interactive map of Ghilassa
- Country: Algeria
- Province: Bordj Bou Arréridj Province

Population (1998)
  - Total: 10,959
- Time zone: UTC+1 (CET)

Ghilassa is a town and commune in Bordj Bou Arréridj Province, Algeria. According to the 1998 census it has a population of 10,959.
