= Tixter =

Coordinates: 36°03′N 5°05′E

- Commune and town
- Interactive map of Tixter
- Country: Algeria
- Province: Bordj Bou Arréridj Province

Population (1998)
  - Total: 9,493
- Time zone: UTC+1 (CET)

Tixter is a town and commune in Bordj Bou Arréridj Province, Algeria. According to the 1998 census it has a population of 9,493.
