= Taglait =

Coordinates: 35°46′18″N 4°59′59″E

- Commune and town
- Interactive map of Taglait
- Country: Algeria
- Province: Bordj Bou Arréridj Province

Population (1998)
  - Total: 5,042
- Time zone: UTC+1 (CET)

Taglait is a town and commune in Bordj Bou Arréridj Province, Algeria. According to the 1998 census it has a population of 5,042.
