= Colla, Bordj Bou Arreridj =

Colla
- Commune and town
- Location of Colla in Algeria
- Coordinates: 36.2593°N 4.6589°E
- Country: Algeria
- Province: Bordj Bou Arréridj

Area
  - Total: 50.00 km^{2} (19.31 sq mi)

Population (2008)
  - Total: 6,123
  - Density: 112.5/km^{2} (291/sq mi)
- Time zone: UTC+1 (CET)
- Postal code: 34185

Colla is a town and commune in Bordj Bou Arréridj Province, Algeria. According to the 1998 census it has a population of 7,963. In 2008, the population was about 6,123. In the commune, as of 2008, there are about 3,250 males, and 2,783 females.
