= Ouled Dahmane =

Coordinates: 36°22′N 3°28′E

- Commune and town
- Interactive map of Ouled Dahmane
- Country: Algeria
- Province: Bordj Bou Arréridj Province

Population (1998)
  - Total: 14,777
- Time zone: UTC+1 (CET)

Ouled Dahmane is a town and commune in Bordj Bou Arréridj Province, Algeria. According to the 1998 census it has a population of 14,777.
