= Bordj Ghedir =

- Commune and town
- Location within Algeria
- Country: Algeria
- Province: Bordj Bou Arréridj Province

Population (1998)
  - Total: 23,289
- Time zone: UTC+1 (CET)

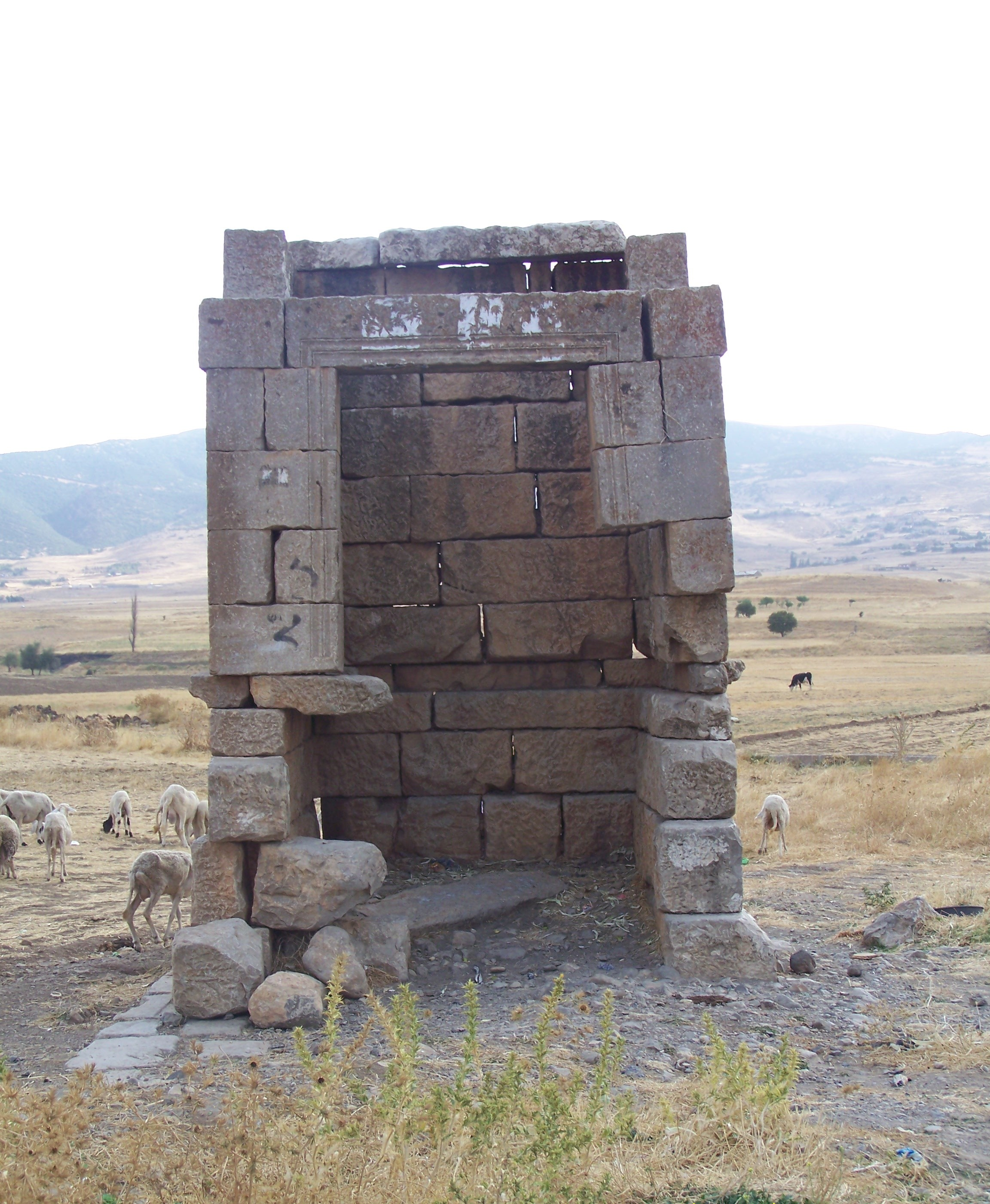

Bordj Ghedir is a town and commune in Bordj Bou Arréridj Province, Algeria. According to the 1998 census, it has a population of 23,289.

== Notable people ==
- Mohamed Nadir Hamimid – Algerian politician
- Mohamed Tiaïba – Algerian footballer
- Mohamed Rafik Omar - Algerian footballer
