= Mansoura, Bordj Bou Arréridj =

Mansoura المنصورة
- Commune and town
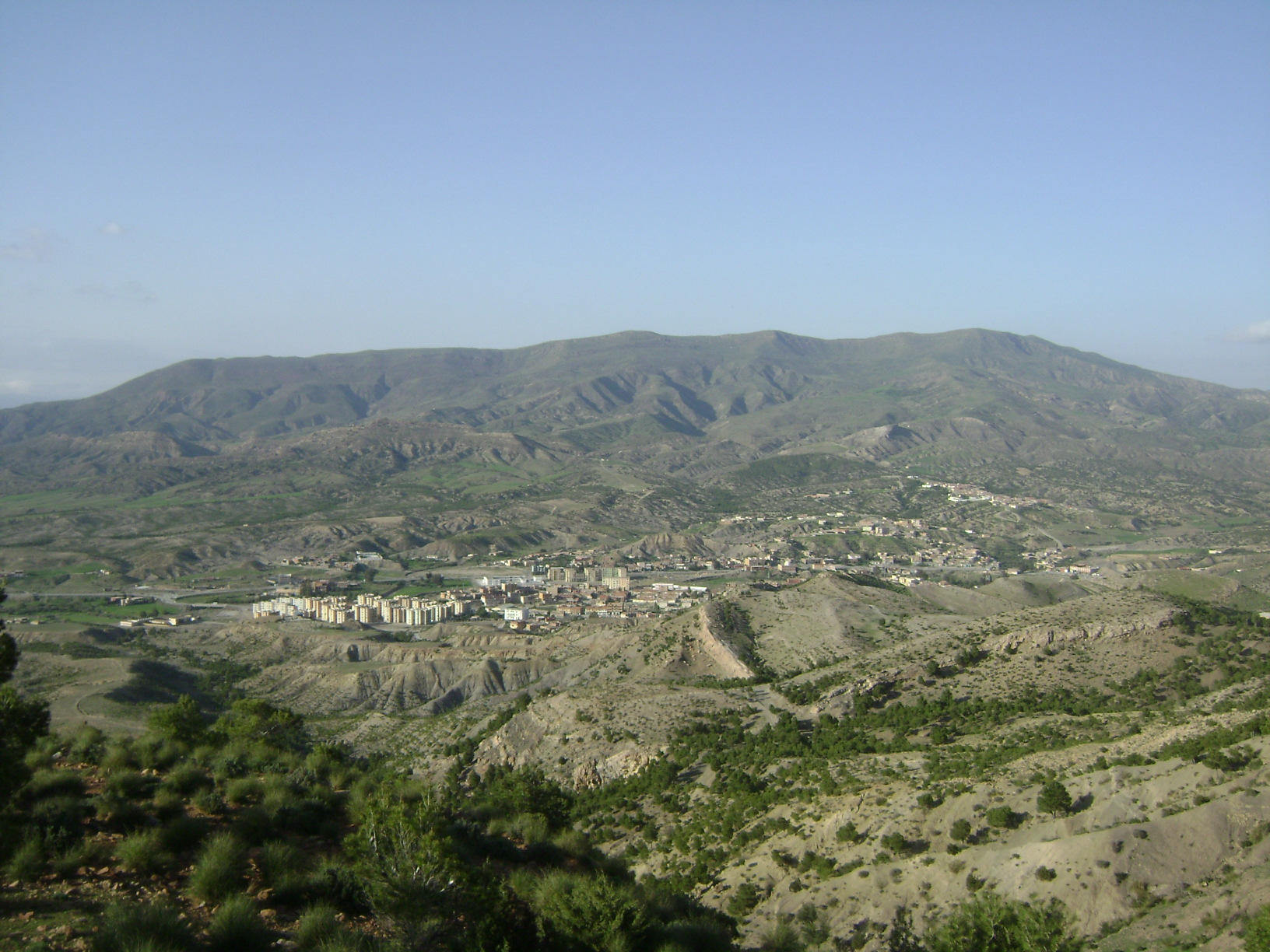
- Mansoura

- Location within Algeria
- Coordinates: 36°4′55″N 4°27′36″E
- Country: Algeria
- Province: Bordj Bou Arréridj Province

Population (2008)
  - Total: 21,280
- Time zone: UTC+1 (CET)

Mansoura, Algeria is a town and commune in Bordj Bou Arréridj Province, Algeria. According to the 1998 census it has a population of 19,979.
