= El Anseur =

Coordinates: 36°12′00″N 4°29′24″E

- Commune and town
- Country: Algeria
- Province: Bordj Bou Arréridj Province

Population (1998)
  - Total: 11,170
- Time zone: UTC+1 (CET)

El Anseur is a town and commune in Bordj Bou Arréridj Province, Algeria. According to the 1998 census it has a population of 11,170.
