= Hasnaoua =

Coordinates: 36°09′09″N 4°47′43″E

- Commune and town
- Interactive map of Hasnaoua
- Country: Algeria
- Province: Bordj Bou Arréridj Province

Population (1998)
  - Total: 18,358
- Time zone: UTC+1 (CET)

Hasnaoua is a town and commune in Bordj Bou Arréridj Province, Algeria. According to the 1998 census it has a population of 18,358.
