= Ksour, Bordj Bou Arreridj =

Coordinates: 35°59′N 4°31′E

- Commune and town
- Interactive map of Ksour, Bordj Bou Arreridj
- Country: Algeria
- Province: Bordj Bou Arréridj Province

Population (1998)
  - Total: 12,540
- Time zone: UTC+1 (CET)

Ksour, Bordj Bou Arreridj is a town and commune in Bordj Bou Arréridj Province, Algeria. According to the 1998 census it had a population of 12,540.
