= Bordj Zemoura =

Bordj Zemoura برج زمورة
- Commune and town
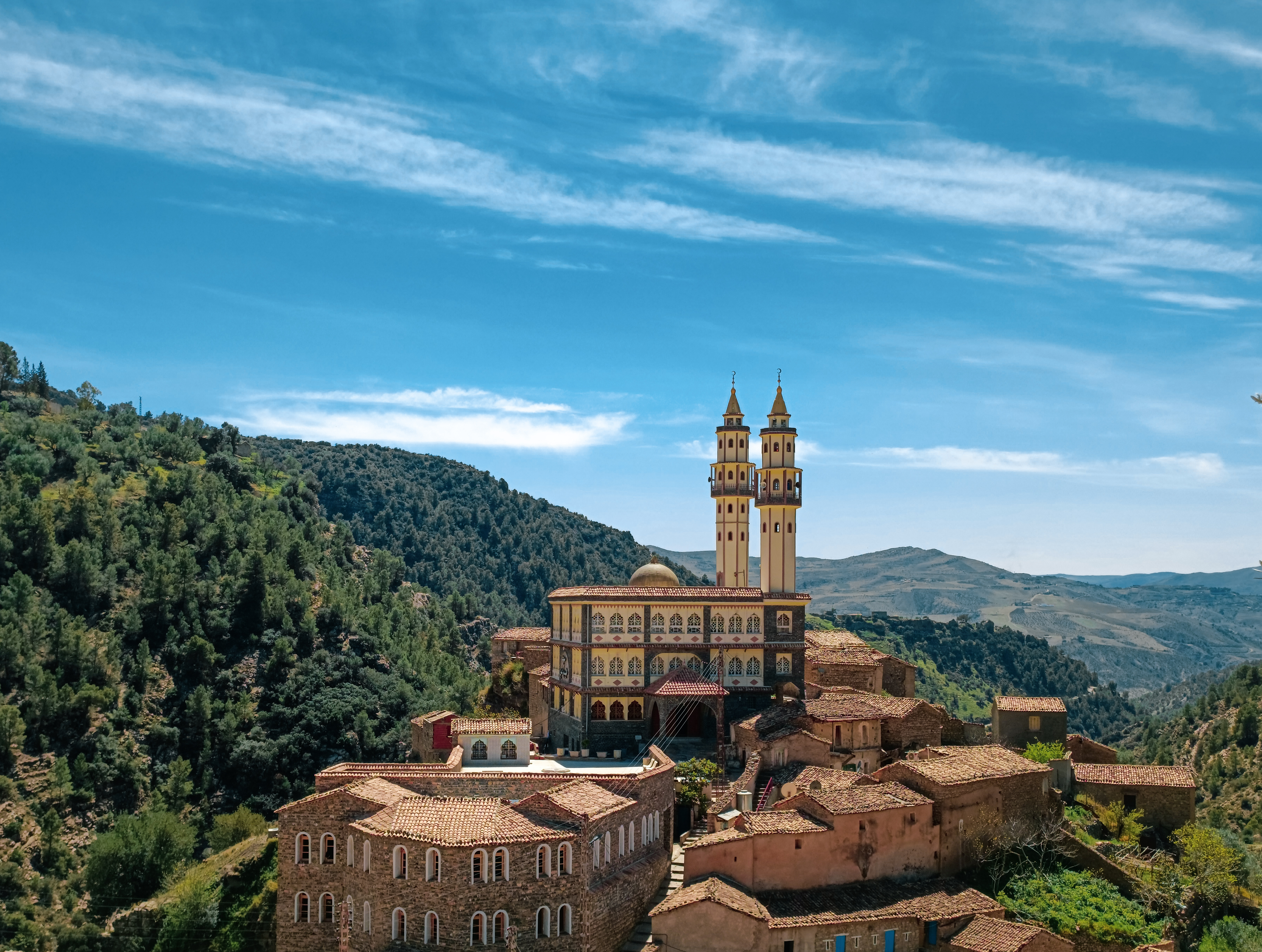

- Location within Algeria
- Country: Algeria
- Province: Bordj Bou Arréridj Province

Population (2008)
  - Total: 10,296
- Time zone: UTC+1 (CET)

Bordj Zemoura is a town and commune in Bordj Bou Arréridj Province, Algeria. According to the 1998 census it has a population of 11,726.
