= Bordj Bou Arréridj =

Bordj Bou Arreridj ⵜⵉⵗⵕⵎⵜ ⵏ ⴱⵓⵄⵉⵕⵉⵕⵉⴵ
- City
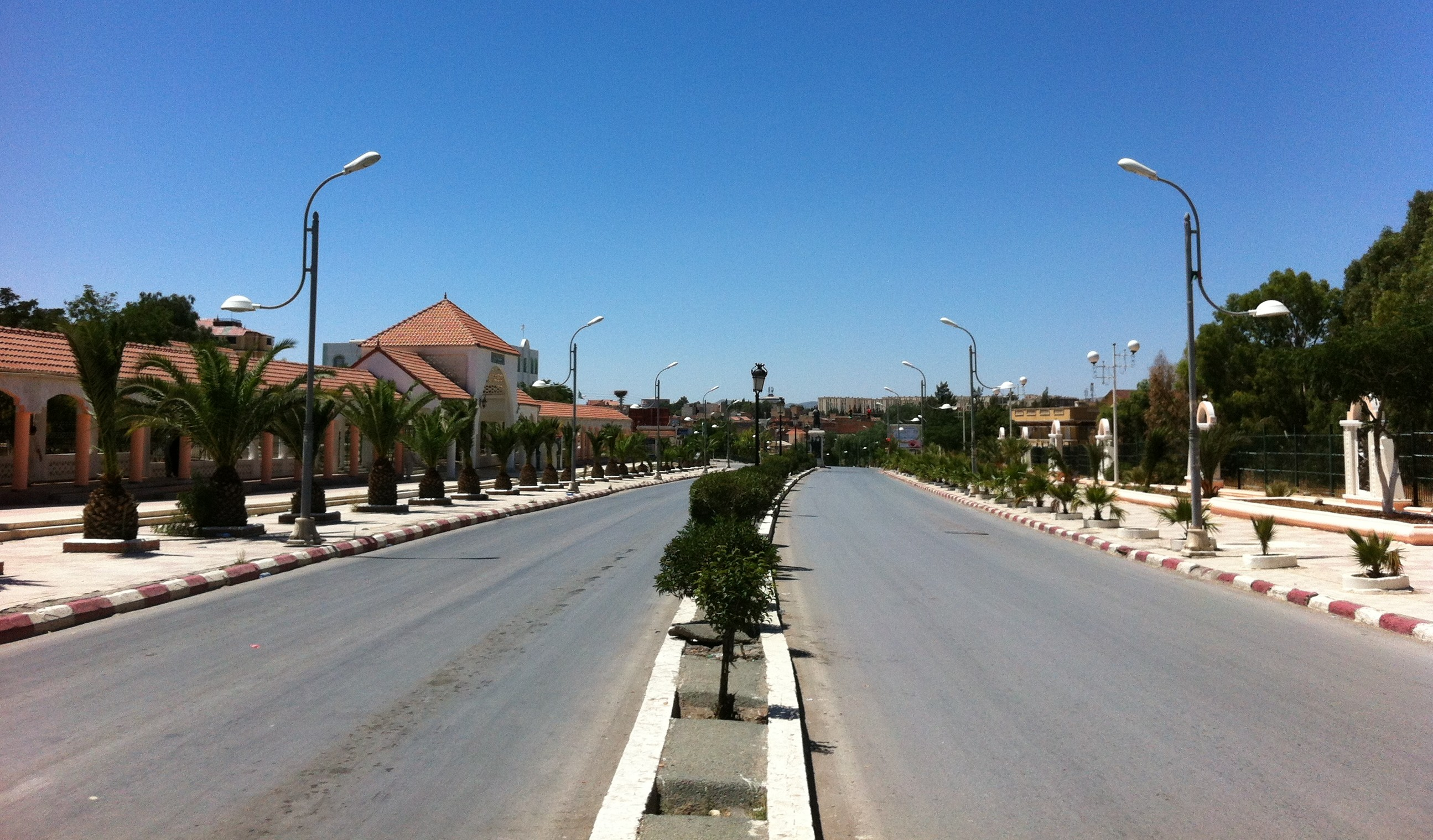
- Bordj Bou Arréridj, N5 national highway across the downtown.

- Location of Bordj Bou Arréridj, Algeria within Bordj Bou Arréridj Province

- Location of Bordj Bou Arréridj within Algeria
- Coordinates: 36.066667°N 4.766667°E
- Country: Algeria
- Province: Bordj Bou Arréridj
- District: Bordj Bou Arréridj District

Area
  - Total: 81.10 km^{2} (31.31 sq mi)
- Elevation: 928 m (3,045 ft)

Population (2008 census)
  - Total: 158,812
  - Density: 1,958/km^{2} (5,072/sq mi)
- Time zone: UTC+1 (CET)
- Postal code: 34000
- Climate: BSk

Bordj Bou Arréridj (Kabyle: Tiɣṛmt n Buɛiṛiṛiǧ Tifinagh: ⵜⵉⵗⵕⵎⵜ ⵏ ⴱⵓⵄⵉⵕⵉⵕⵉⴵ, Arabic: برج بوعريريج) is the capital city of Bordj Bou Arréridj Province, Algeria. According to the 2008 estimation, its population was 168,346. It is situated 148 miles by road east of Algiers, near the Hodna Massif in the southern Kabylie Mountains, at an elevation of 916 metres.

The economy is largely based upon agriculture and forestry, with some small-scale industries. Bordj Bou Arréridj is well-connected to other urban centres by road and rail. The cities of Sétif and Bouira are 70 km east and 115 km northwest, respectively. CA Bordj Bou Arréridj (CABBA) is a 1st Level Algerian professional football club based in town; its home grounds are 20 August 1955 Stadium in Mohamed Belouizdad.

== History ==
Historical population
Year	Population
1901	7,400
1948	21,900
1954	24,000
1966	33,800
1977	54,500 (town); 65,000 (municipality)
1987	84,300
1998	129,000
2008	168,346

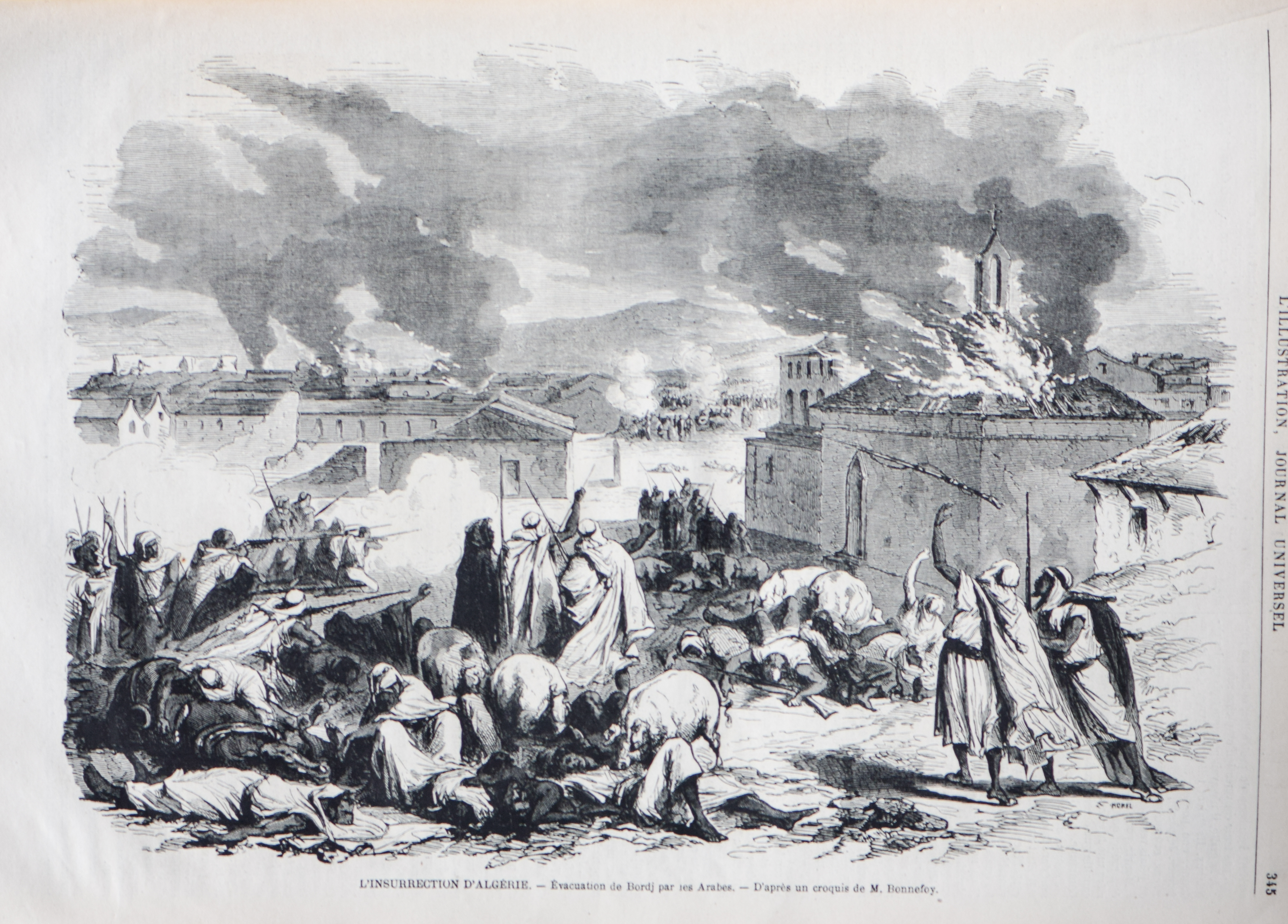
French troops suppress the Algerian insurrection 1871

== Economy ==
The city is considered highly innovative for presence of many high-tech. The city is home to a number of technology companies. The city is home to the headquarters of Condor Electronics.

== Sports ==
Bordj Bou Arréridj has a team in the Algerian Ligue Professionnelle 1: CA Bordj Bou Arréridj, founded in 1931. They also have two teams in the Algerian Basketball Championship: IRB Bordj Bou Arréridj and OS Bordj Bou Arréridj.

== Climate ==
Climate data for Bordj Bou Arréridj (1991–2020)
Month	Jan	Feb	Mar	Apr	May	Jun	Jul	Aug	Sep	Oct	Nov	Dec	Year
Record high °C (°F)	23.0 (73.4)	26.5 (79.7)	28.9 (84.0)	31.2 (88.2)	39.6 (103.3)	42.1 (107.8)	43.5 (110.3)	42.5 (108.5)	37.7 (99.9)	34.5 (94.1)	27.1 (80.8)	22.8 (73.0)	43.5 (110.3)
Mean daily maximum °C (°F)	11.2 (52.2)	12.4 (54.3)	16.1 (61.0)	19.7 (67.5)	25.2 (77.4)	31.3 (88.3)	35.5 (95.9)	34.8 (94.6)	28.5 (83.3)	23.0 (73.4)	15.8 (60.4)	11.9 (53.4)	22.1 (71.8)
Daily mean °C (°F)	6.6 (43.9)	7.4 (45.3)	10.6 (51.1)	13.6 (56.5)	18.5 (65.3)	23.9 (75.0)	27.9 (82.2)	27.3 (81.1)	22.1 (71.8)	17.3 (63.1)	11.1 (52.0)	7.6 (45.7)	16.2 (61.2)
Mean daily minimum °C (°F)	2.0 (35.6)	2.4 (36.3)	5.0 (41.0)	7.5 (45.5)	11.7 (53.1)	16.4 (61.5)	20.2 (68.4)	19.7 (67.5)	15.6 (60.1)	11.7 (53.1)	6.4 (43.5)	3.2 (37.8)	10.2 (50.4)
Record low °C (°F)	−7.5 (18.5)	−7.3 (18.9)	−3.3 (26.1)	−2.8 (27.0)	−1.9 (28.6)	2.0 (35.6)	9.1 (48.4)	10.9 (51.6)	7.4 (45.3)	1.2 (34.2)	−2.6 (27.3)	−3.6 (25.5)	−7.5 (18.5)
Average precipitation mm (inches)	37.3 (1.47)	27.7 (1.09)	33.4 (1.31)	39.2 (1.54)	37.0 (1.46)	20.2 (0.80)	8.9 (0.35)	15.4 (0.61)	44.1 (1.74)	29.7 (1.17)	32.2 (1.27)	31.7 (1.25)	356.8 (14.05)
Average precipitation days (≥ 1.0 mm)	6.4	5.9	5.9	5.4	5.2	3.1	1.7	2.6	5.0	4.8	5.8	5.9	57.7
Mean monthly sunshine hours	186.3	193.0	230.7	257.3	301.8	332.7	354.6	324.8	256.4	238.8	181.3	172.9	3,030.6
Source: NOAA
