= Bordj Bou Arréridj Province =

Province of Algeria

Bordj Bou Arréridj Province ولاية برج بوعريريج
- Province
- Map of Algeria highlighting Bordj Bou Arréridj
- Coordinates: 36°04′N 4°46′E
- Country: Algeria
- Capital: Bordj Bou Arréridj

Government
  - Wāli: Mr. Azzedine Mechri

Area
  - Total: 4,115 km^{2} (1,589 sq mi)

Population (2008)
  - Total: 661,115
  - Density: 160.7/km^{2} (416.1/sq mi)
- Time zone: UTC+01 (CET)
- Area Code: +213 (0) 35
- ISO 3166 code: DZ-34
- Districts: 10
- Municipalities: 34

Bordj Bou Arréridj Province (Arabic: ولاية برج بوعريريج) is a province (wilaya) in northern Algeria, around 200 km from the capital Algiers. It is considered as a crossroads between the east and west, the north and south.

It is notable for its many electronic industries. Its capital is Bordj Bou Arréridj. Other localities include Bir Kasd Ali and Glela.

The estimated population of Bordj Bou Arréridj is about 661,115 residents.

Its location made it an important economic pole in the context of development in Algeria, as it is made up of several economic and industrial groups. Within the privatization process, and the market economy, this state has become a destination for some foreign companies in order to invest, especially in the field of electronic industries and agribusiness.

== Location ==
The wilaya is located on the territory of the High Plains, riding on the mountain of Bibans; the wilaya of Bordj Bou Arréridj is geographically in eastern Algeria. It is halfway through the route between Algiers and Constantine.

The Province is located northeast of the country. It is bordered by:

- East: Wilaya of Sétif.
- West: Wilaya of Bouira.
- North: Wilaya of Bejaia.
- South: Wilaya of M'Sila.

== Relief ==
The wilaya is divided into three geographical areas which follow:

- A mountainous area, with the north, the chain of Bibans.
- An area of high plains constitutes most of the province.
- A steppe zone, in the southwest, oriented agro-pastoral.

The altitude varies between 302 m and 1,885 m.

== Climate ==
The province is characterized by semi-dry continental climate that offers warm temperatures in summer and very cold in winter, among the lowest in Algeria. The annual rainfall is 300 to 700 mm. It's also known by the heavy snowfall, especially in the north, leading to the interruption of the roads and the difficulty in traffic especially on the National Road No. 05.

== Hydrography ==
The wilaya of Bordj Bou Arréridj has many water sources; it recorded the presence of natural spas. The most known is Hammam Al Biban in the west which has been renovated, and Hamam Al Ibaynan in the north. The main rivers flowing through the wilaya are Oued Bousselam and Oued el Ksoub in the south of the wilaya.

== History ==
The wilaya has experienced various civilizations. The Romans, who left numerous traces, the Vandals, the Hammadids, and the Almohads, but also the Ottomans and finally the French, conquered the area and eventually settled there mainly because of its fertile land. Mohamed El Mokrani, a historical figure, rebelled during the colonial period with the support of local residents against the French presence. This revolt, known as the Mokrani Revolt, was followed by severe repression, which led to the execution and many deportations to New Caledonia, where an Algerian community still exists today, and the sequestration of the best land for to European settlers.

During the Algerian War, Bordj Bou Arréridj was part of the wilaya III (Kabylie), and Bordj Ghedir, in the south of the wilaya, was the site of many battles during the war in Algeria.

The province was created from Sétif Province in 1984.

== Population ==
The province knows an imbalance in the distribution of populations created by the movement of people to the central high plains, one along the highways and urban centers because of natural constraints related to the nature of steppe and mountain areas in the north and south.

== Culture ==
The Spring Festival is a traditional festival where every first Friday of March, the population of the wilaya go on a picnic. Families prepare foods and cakes typical of the region, with only natural ingredients: semolina, honey, butter, eggs, vegetables and dates.

The wilaya of Bordj Bou Arréridj is a mosaic of Algerian traditions that combine the Kabyles, Setifians, Sahraouis and Chaouis, and a crossroads of all rural and urban traditions of the country which gave a culinary wealth to the area. Thus, the olive is celebrated on the day of spring in the mountainous areas of north and throughout Kabylie. The south is marked by the traditions of Hodna, while the east by the traditions of Setifians. Chaoui culture is present in the municipalities bordering the mountainous provinces of Batna and M'sila, in the Daira of Bordj Zemmoura, some Turkish traditions remain.

== Agriculture ==
Bordj Bou Arréridj is a preeminently agricultural province, with the area of the Hautes Plaines being especially suitable for cereal cultivation. In the north, the mountainous area of the Bibans is dominated by tree crops, especially olive and fig trees; the area has many traditional oil mills. The southwest area is a steppe where pastoral farming is extensively associated with the cultivation of cereal in fallow areas.

== Industry ==
The wilaya of Bordj Bou Arréridj became a young industrial center. It is among the most dynamic wilaya in Algeria, particularly in the electronics industry and agribusiness. It was renamed by the Algerians "Capital of Electronics." Several groups have settled on national dimensions, such as Cobra, Cristor, Star, Condor, Samsung and Nidor. Bordj Bou Arréridj is marked by its private contractors.

The Algerian government encourages the development of the High Plains (Setif-Bordj Bou Arréridj) through the deployment of several major initiatives, such as the construction of infrastructure such as the East-West highway and the creation of areas of integrated industrial activities. A new industrial area was established in the commune of El Hamadia to relieve the industrial area of the city of Bordj Bou Arréridj.

== Administrative divisions ==
It is made up of 10 districts and 34 communes or municipalities.

=== Districts ===
1. Aïn Taghrout
2. Bir Kasd Ali
3. Bordj Bou Arréridj (District-municipality)
4. Bordj Ghedir
5. Bordj Zemmoura
6. Djaâfra
7. El Hamadia
8. Mansourah
9. Medjana
10. Ras El Oued

=== Communes ===
1. Achabou
2. Aïn Taghrout
3. Aïn Tesra
4. Belimour
5. Ben Daoud
6. Bir Kasdali
7. Bordj-Bou-Arreridj
8. Bordj Ghédir
9. Bordj Zemoura
10. Colla
11. Djaafra
12. El Ach
13. El Achir
14. El Anseur
15. El Hamadia
16. El Main
17. El M'hir
18. Ghilassa
19. Haraza
20. Hasnaoua
21. Khelil
22. Ksour
23. Mansoura
24. Medjana
25. Ouled Brahem
26. Ouled Dahmane
27. Ouled Sidi Brahim
28. Rabta
29. Ras El Oued
30. Sidi Embarek
31. Tafreg
32. Taglait
33. Teniet En-Nasr
34. Tesmart
35. Tixter
