= Sidi Embarek =

Coordinates: 36°06′14″N 4°54′43″E

- Commune and town
- Interactive map of Sidi Embarek
- Country: Algeria
- Province: Bordj Bou Arréridj Province

Population (1998)
  - Total: 10,281
- Time zone: UTC+1 (CET)

Sidi Embarek is a town and commune in Bordj Bou Arréridj Province, Algeria. According to the 1998 census it has a population of 10,281.
