= El Main =

El-Maïn
- Commune and town
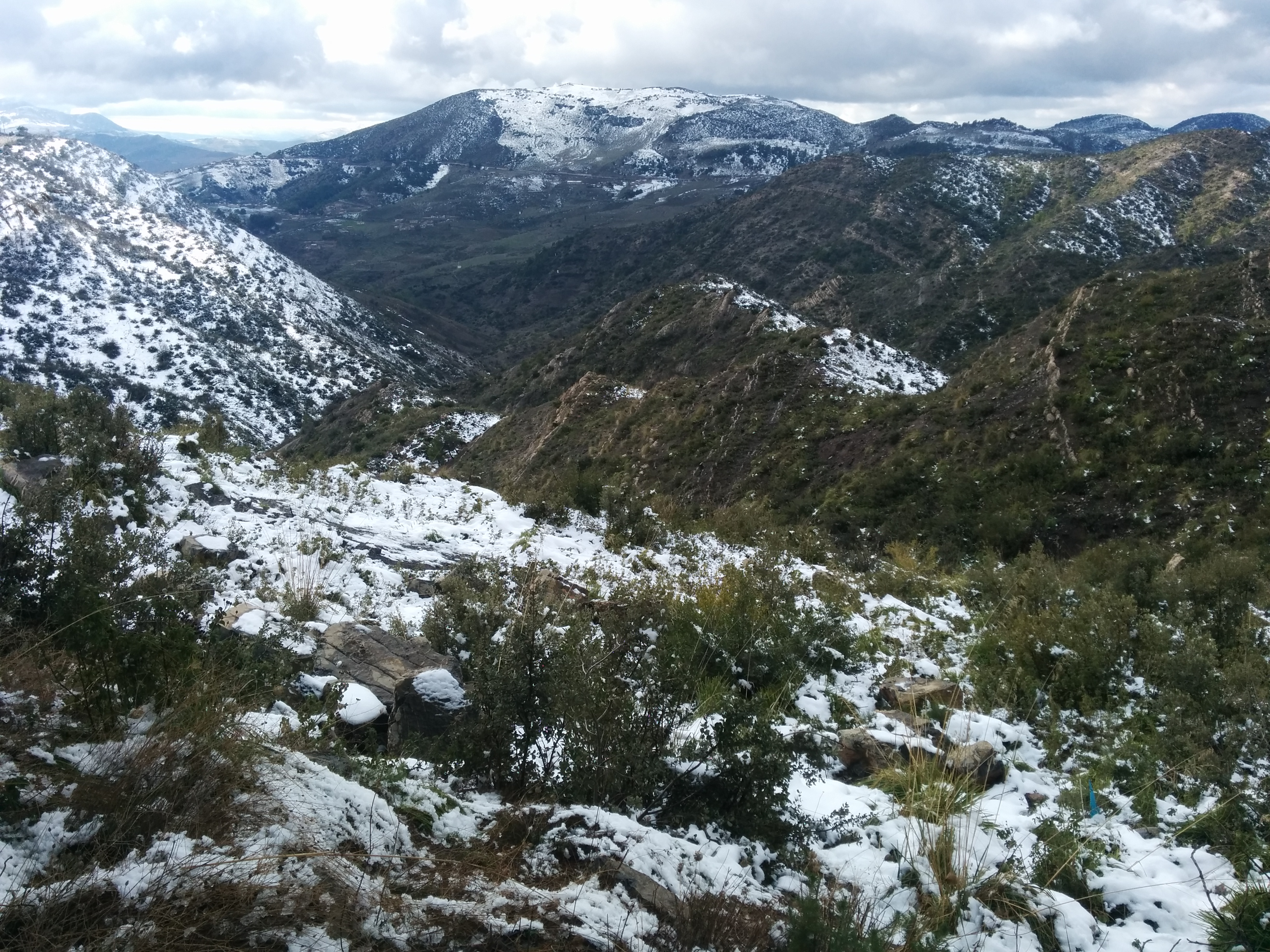

- Location within Algeria
- Country: Algeria
- Province: Bordj Bou Arréridj Province

Population (1998)
  - Total: 6,256
- Time zone: UTC+1 (CET)

El-Maïn is a town and commune in Bordj Bou Arréridj Province, Algeria. According to the 2025 census it has a population of 7,798. It has an area of 73.4 km².
