= Bastion de France =

Coordinates: 36°55′6.01″N 8°20′31.85″E

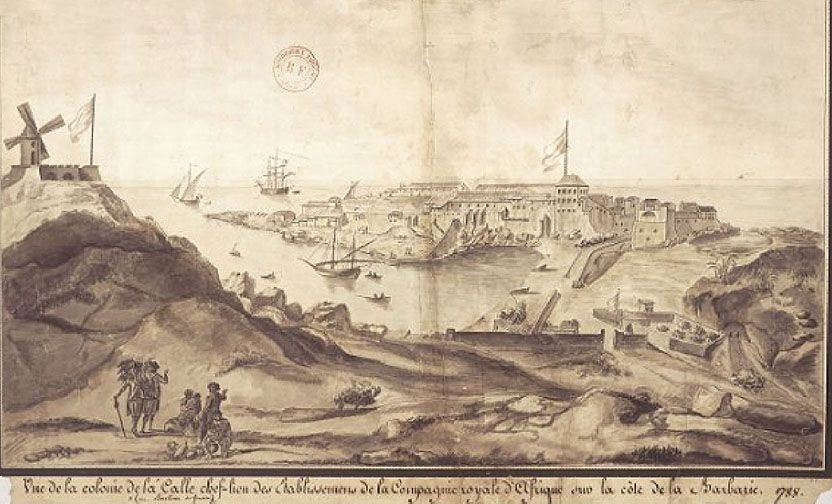
Bastion de France in 1688

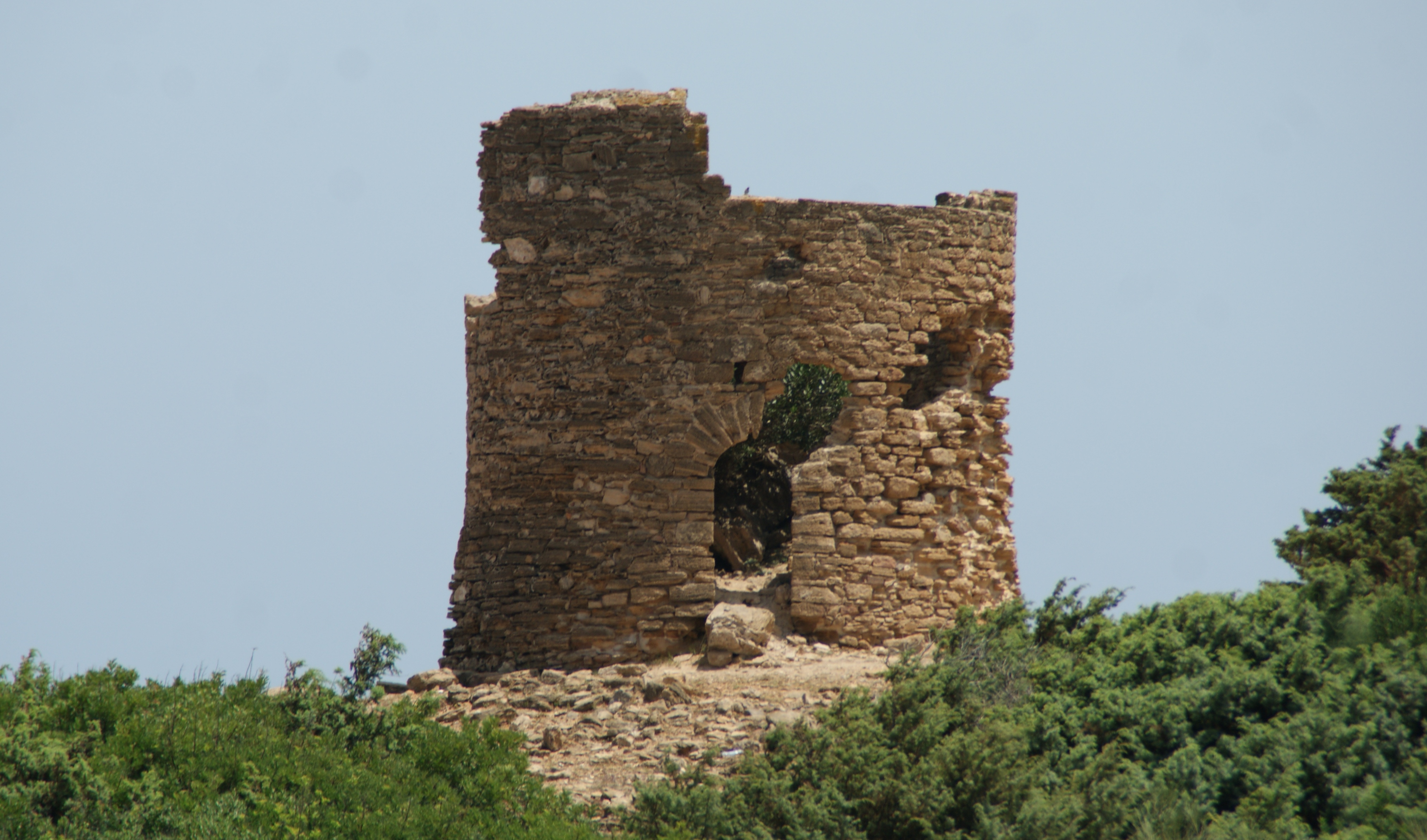
Ruins of the Bastion de France near El Kala, Algeria.

The Bastion de France was a trading post founded in the sixteenth century by French merchants of Corsican origin who had established themselves in North Africa near Annaba, Algeria. It developed important commercial links with Marseille, especially in the valuable coral trade. It was demolished and rebuilt a number of times.

== Tomasino Lenche ==
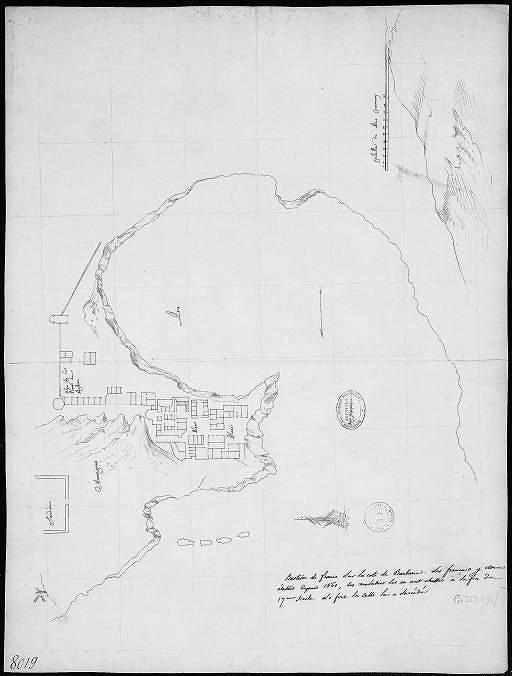
Bastion de France

The Bastion de France was built in 1561 by Tomasino Lenche to secure his family's lucrative position in the coral fisheries off the North African coast. The Lenche family (also known as Linche, Lencio or Lenciu) were originally from Morsiglia (Cap Corse) and Tomasino Lenche had established himself in business in Marseille as early as 1533. In 1550, Sultan Selim II granted him the right to fish for coral at Massacarès, (Mers el-Kharez) near Annaba. The following year Henri II of France granted him a monopoly on this fishery, which was renewed in 1560 by Charles IX.

In 1552 Tomasino established the Magnifique Compagnie du corail (Magnificent Coral Company) together with his nephews Visconte (c.1545-1580) and Antonio Lenche (c.1540-1588), and his Porrata cousins from Morsiglia. Commercial activity grew rapidly - there were soon 250 fishermen working on 50 vessels. Coral was highly profitable: a fisherman was paid 12 sols (equivalent to half a livre) for a pound of coral, which could then be sold for six livres. It was a luxury product used in gold working (for example in the making of rosaries) and was used as a form of currency in the Levantine ports and particularly in Alexandria.

== Antonio Lenche ==
The Bastion was seized by Algiers in 1568, but the Lenches were able to quickly regain control. Tomasino's nephew Antonio, one of the richest men in Marseille, served as governor of the Bastion de France (1568-1588). During this period Henri III confirmed the monopoly of the Magnifique compagnie (1582) and extended its limits to include the fisheries of Bizerte (1584). During this period his cousin Orso-Santo Cipriani founded a second coral company, the Compagnie du corail, ensuring that the entire North African coast was controlled by Lenche family companies. Their business affairs became dangerously entangled in the Wars of Religion. The Lenche family supported Henri III against the Catholic League, while Genoa, which ruled Corsica, took the opposing side. In the intense rivalries of the time, Antonio Lenche was assassinated in 1588 by supporters of the Catholic League.

== Thomas II Lenche ==
Antionio's son Thomas took over as governor of the Bastion in 1597. but the prosperity of the Lenches was threatened by the warlike politics of North Africa. In June 1604, the Bastion de France was destroyed by the militia of Annaba, supported by galleys from Rais Murad of Algiers. The Lenches appealed for help to Henri IV who protested through his consul in Algiers, M. de Vias. In response the consul was severely beaten, but eventually Thomas was able to secure the return of his privileges.

In 1602 the Bastion de France was visited in the name of King Henri IV by Charles of Lorraine, Duc de Guise, confirming the French presence. However, in 1604, following further intrigues and disputes, the Bastion was once again seized and destroyed. France retained sufficient influence in Istanbul to secure the dismissal of the Dey of Algiers for this outrage, who was then strangled. In 1608 Algiers made a new contract favouring merchants from Bordeaux, which was seeking to oust Marseille from its preeminent position in the luxury trades, and push the Lenche family out of their foothold.

A new attack from Algiers was mounted in 1615–1616. On 14 March 1616, captain Jacques Vinciguerra appeared to re-establish the Bastion de France. During the period of peace that began in 1617 Jean-Louis du Mas de Castellane was sent by the Ottoman Sultan to negotiate the restoration of the Bastion to the French; while he was in Algiers however war broke out again and he was taken captive, and only released in 1619.

In 1619, exhausted by this constant destruction, Thomas II Lenche sold his rights over the Bastion to the duc de Guise, governor of Provence, in exchange for an annual pension of 4,800 livres tournois.

== Sanson Napollon ==
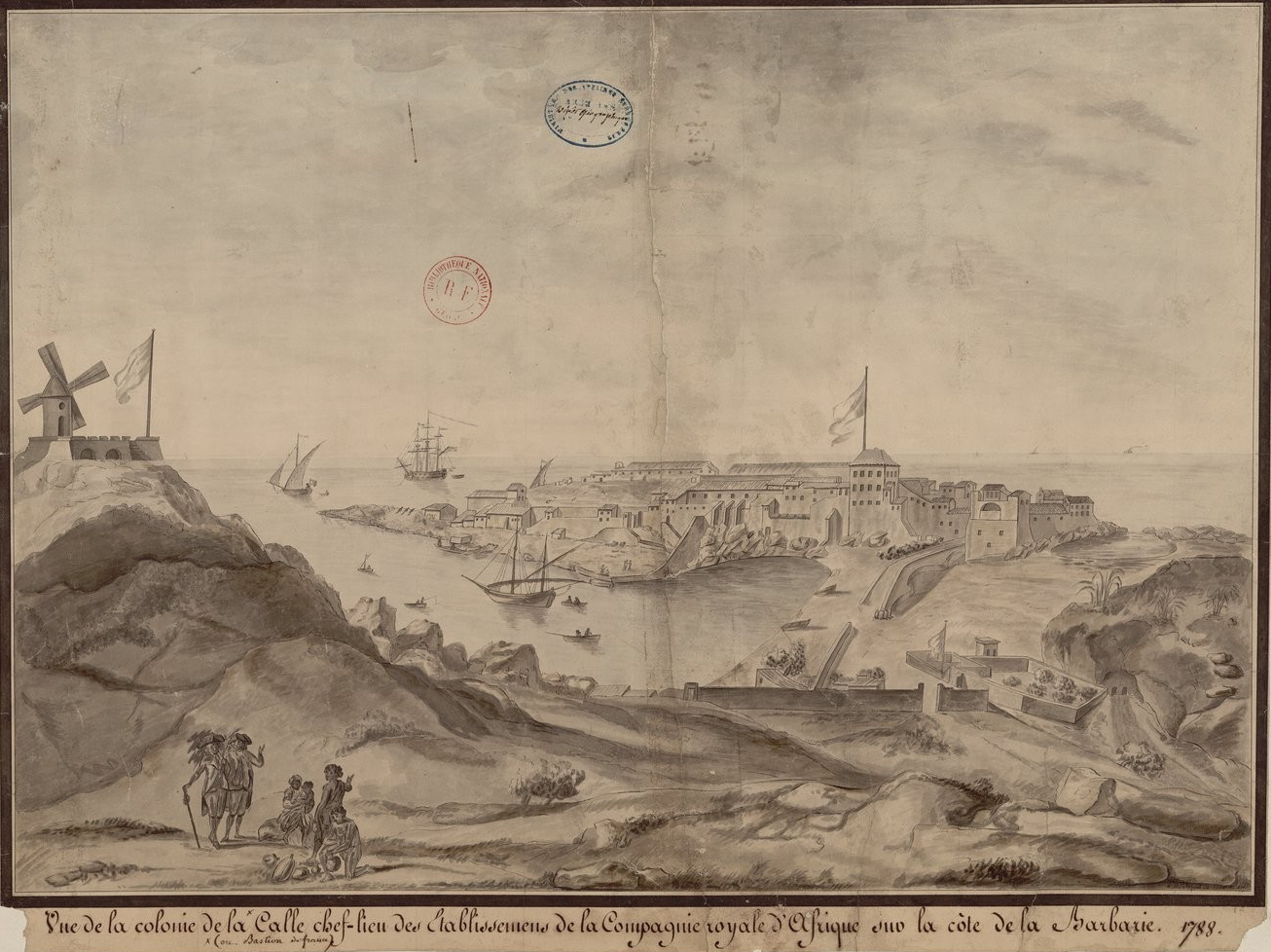
View of La Calle (El Kala) 1788. In the 18th century, private trading companies were replaced by the Compagnie royale d'Afrique, which assumed control of the Bastion.

In the late 1620s relations between France and Algiers finally normalised. On 19 September 1628, Sanson Napollon, a cousin of the Lenches, signed a treaty re-establishing safe passage for merchant ships. On 8 October, the commander of the Algiers galleys informed the consuls from Marseille that two robes of honour had been offered to Napollon. Louis XIII paid 272,435 livres to purchase the freedom of European slaves, the cost of campaigns and gifts. Napollon assumed control over the trading posts of Annaba, La Calle (El Kala) Bastion de France. As well as resuming the coral fishery, Sanson Napollon opened a new base on Cap Rosa to capitalise on the illegal wheat trade.

In 1631, Louis named Sanson Napollon governor of the Bastion de France, which was now the property of the crown rather than the duc de Guise. However, in 1633, Sanson Napollon was killed in an attack led by the Genoese, and in 1637, a new Algerian offensive led by the galley commander Ali Bitchinin, dealt a lethal blow to the French trading posts. The buildings of Bastion de France, El Kala and Cap Rosa were destroyed, although an agreement with Algiers in 1640 allowed for them to be rebuilt.

For half a century, the Bastion lay in ruins. In 1684, after the Bombardment of Algiers (1683) the Dey of Algiers signed a new peace treaty with Tourville. For a period of one hundred years, control was ceded to France of the Bastion de France, La Calle, Cap Rosa, Annaba, Béjaïa and other places. A treaty of 1689 between France and Algiers granted the Bastion and the right to trade there to the Hély Company.

== See also ==
- Tabarka
- European enclaves in North Africa before 1830
- History of the Mediterranean region
- List of cultural assets of Algeria
