= European enclaves in North Africa before 1830 =

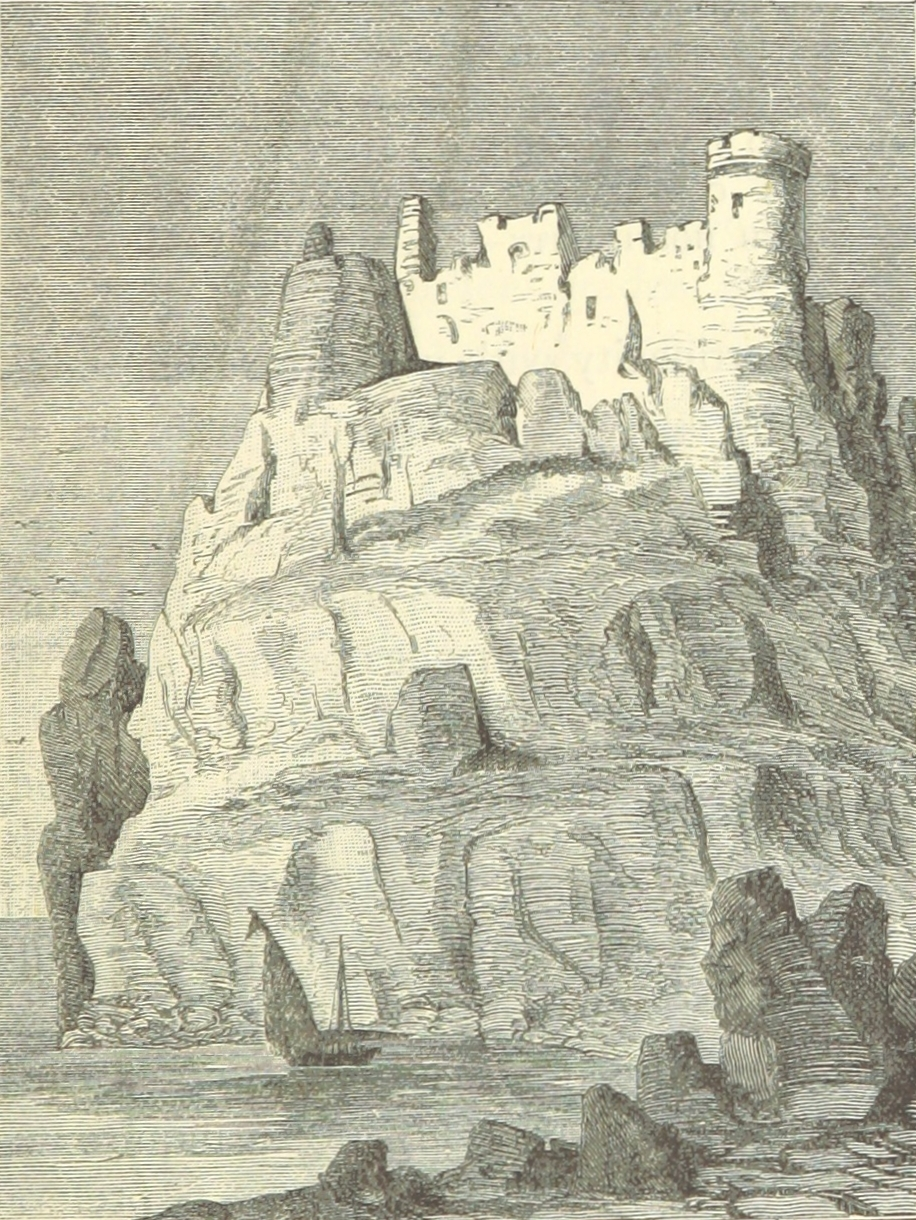
Genoese Tabarka fort, built in the Middle Ages

The European enclaves in North Africa (technically 'semi-enclaves') were towns, fortifications and trading posts on the Mediterranean and Atlantic coasts of western North Africa (sometimes called also "Maghreb"), obtained by various European powers in the period before they had the military capacity to occupy the interior (i.e. before the French conquest of Algeria in 1830). The earliest medieval enclaves were established in the 11th century CE by the Italian Kingdom of Sicily and Maritime republics; Spain and Portugal were the main European powers involved; both France and, briefly, England also had a presence. Most of these enclaves had been evacuated by the late 18th century, and today only the Spanish possessions of Ceuta, Melilla, and the Plazas de soberanía remain.

== Italian and Sicilian possessions ==
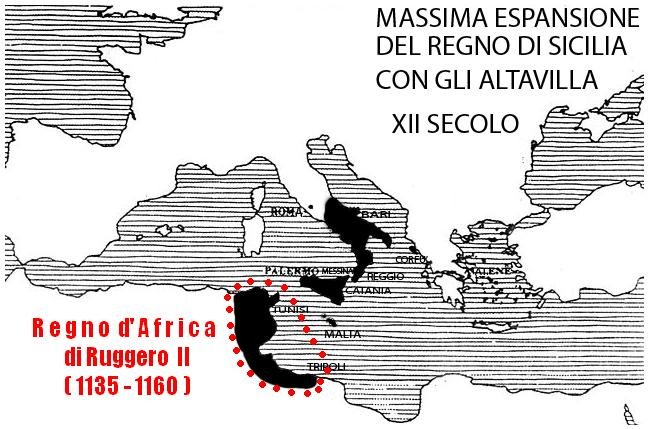
The Norman Kingdom of Africa in the 12th century

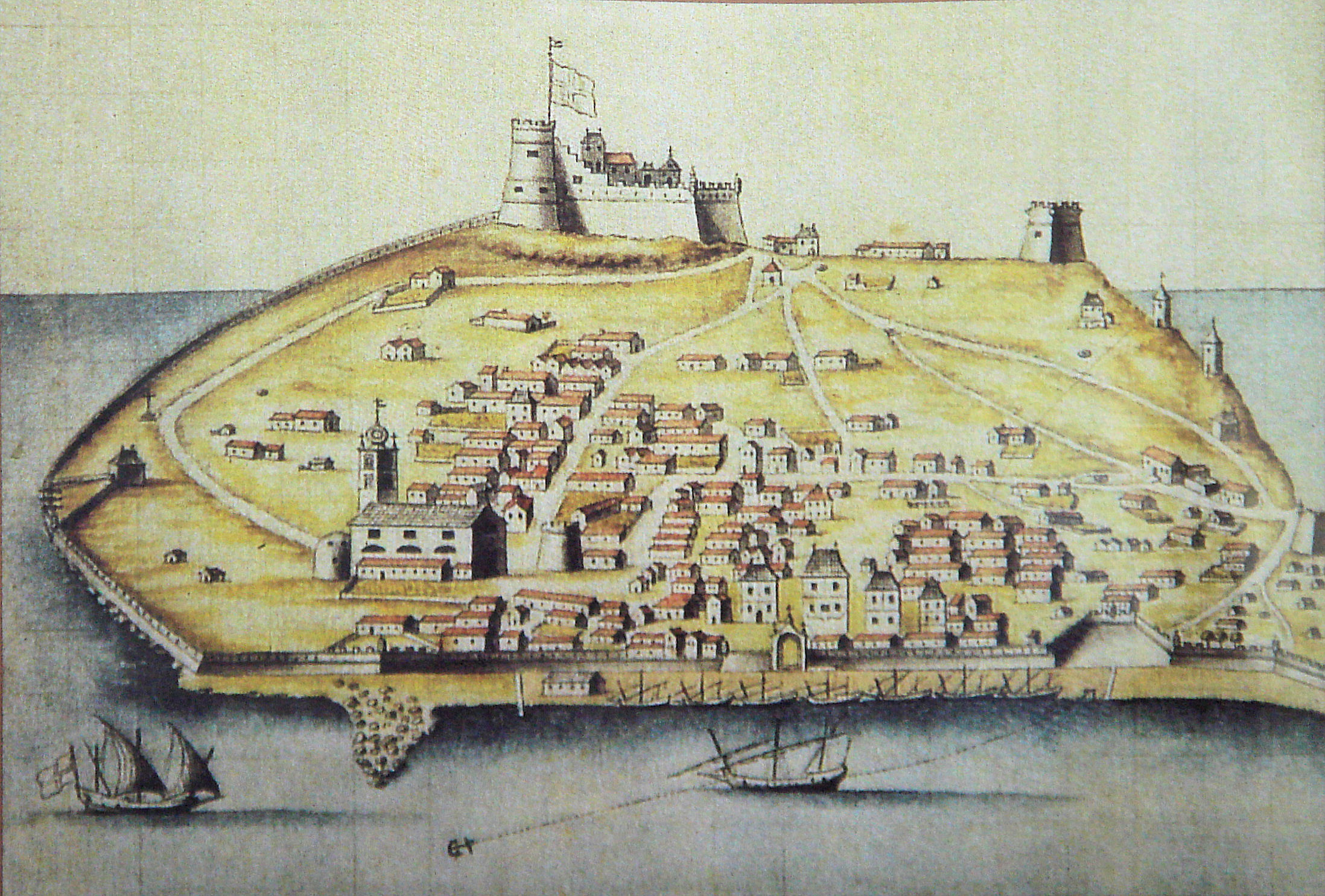
The Genoese island of Tabarka in the 18th century

Around the year 1000, small colonies of merchants began to appear in North Africa from the Republic of Amalfi and the Republic of Pisa. In 1133, Pisa negotiated a commercial treaty with the Almoravids, as did Genoa some five years later. As Almoravid power weakened, the Maritime Republics grew bolder and Pisa attempted to seize the Balearic Islands in 1114 In 1134, just one year after signing a commercial treaty with Béjaïa, Genoa attacked the city before sending a combined fleet with Pisa to seize Annaba in 1136. The Pisans themselves raided Tabarka in 1140. These Italian initiatives were particularly focused on gaining control of the lucrative coral trade. There are records of the coastal area of Marsacares (today El Kala) being under the jurisdiction, at various times, of Pisa and later, Genoa.

The arrival of the Normans in Italy led to the Christian reconquest of Sicily (1061–1091). Roger II of Sicily expanded his domains by taking Djerba in 1135. There followed the seizure of a number of Tunisian coastal cities, leading to the formation of a short-lived entity that is sometimes known as the Norman Kingdom of Africa.

After the evacuation of Mahdia in 1160, the Normans ceased to control any places on the North African coast. In 1284 the new Aragonese ruler of Sicily,Peter III, invaded Djerba once again and held it until 1333. It was retaken for Sicily by Manfredi Chiaramonte, who became lord of the island, and also seized the Kerkennah Islands. The Sicilian garrison abandoned the island in 1392, the year after Chiaramonte died.

After this, the only Italian possessions in North Africa belonged to Genoa, which held Jijel (Algeria) as well as Tabarka (Tunisia), retaining the latter from 1540 to 1742.

From West to East:

- Jijel (Djidjelli) (intermittently before 1514)
- Mers el-Kharez (Marsacares) today El Kala (11th–12th centuries)
- Tabarka (Tabarca) (1540–1742)
- Norman Kingdom of Africa (1148–1160)
- Djerba (Gerba) (1135–1158, 1284–1333, 1389–1392)

== Portuguese possessions ==
Portuguese possessions in North Africa

The Portuguese presence in North Africa dates from the reign of King João I who led the conquest of Ceuta in 1415. and continued until El Jadida was abandoned in 1769. The enclaves, mostly along the Atlantic coast of Morocco, were known in Portugal as the "Algarve-Beyond-the-Sea" ('Algarve de Além-Mar'), or African Algarve, in contrast with "European Algarve".

The taking of Ceuta was recognised by Pope Martin V as a crusade. Possession of the city brought no economic benefits to Portugal however, as trade simply moved to other cities in the region. Accordingly, João's successor King Duarte tried to take Tangier as well in 1437, but was unable to do so. It was not until the reign of Duarte's son Afonso V that Portugal was able to expand its possessions in North Africa, taking Ksar es-Seghir in 1458 and Arcila in 1471. He also retook Tangier, but could not hold it. Afonso was known as o Africano (the African) because of his conquests, and he was the first Portuguese ruler to take the title 'King of Portugal and of the Algarves on this side and beyond the sea in Africa'. In 1486 his successor Joao II seized and fortified El Jadida (Mazagan) as the Portuguese continued their drive south towards Guinea. Two years later he accepted the submission of the governor of Safi.

The remaining Portuguese conquests in Morocco were secured by king Manuel I – Agadir, Essaouira and Azemmour. El Jadida was retaken after an earlier loss, and in 1508 direct rule was established over Safi. Mehdya was taken in 1515, though it was lost soon after in 1541. The old pirate base at Anfa, which the Portuguese had destroyed in 1468, before reoccupying and fortifying it in 1515, came to be known as "Casa Branca", hence, eventually, Casablanca.

By the time of Joao III, the Portuguese Empire had expanded around the globe. In this context, retaining or perhaps expanding the possessions in Morocco held no economic attraction and seemed increasingly unsustainable in military terms. In 1541 Agadir fell to the Saadi prince Moulay Muhammad, and in the same year, Portugal also lost Safi and Azamor. In 1550, they went on to lose Ksar es-Seghir and Arcila.

In 1577 Sebastian I of Portugal was able to reconquer Arcila, though it was taken by the Saadi ruler Almanzor in 1589. However Sebastian's disastrous crusade in Morocco cost him his life and brought an end to the age of Portuguese expansion. Indeed, it led to the extinction of the independent Portuguese state between 1580 and 1640.

In 1640 Portugal regained its independence, but Ceuta opted to remain with Spain, a situation that was officially acknowledged in the Treaty of Lisbon (1668). After this Portugal retained only three enclaves in North Africa – Tangier, Casablanca and El Jadida. Tangier was ceded to England in 1661 under the Marriage Treaty as part of the dowry of Catherine of Braganza, and Casablanca was abandoned after the Lisbon earthquake of 1755. Under siege by Muhammad III, El Jadida was evacuated on 10 March 1769, bringing an end to the Portuguese presence in North Africa.

From West to East:

- Agadir (Santa Cruz do Cabo de Gué) (1505–1541)
- Essaouira (Mogador) (1506–1525)
- Souira Guedima (Aguz) (1506–1525)
- Safi (Safim) (1488–1541)
- El Jadida (Mazagão) (1486–1769)
- Azemmour (Azamor) (1513–1541)
- Casablanca (Anfa / Casa Branca) (1515–1755)
- Asilah (Arzila) (1471–1550 and 1577–1589)
- Tangier (Tânger) (1471–1661)
- Ksar es-Seghir (Alcácer-Ceguer) (1458–1550)
- Ceuta (1415–1640)

== Spanish possessions ==
Having taken Granada in 1492, the Catholic Monarchs of Spain wanted to extend the Reconquista across the Straits of Gibraltar.

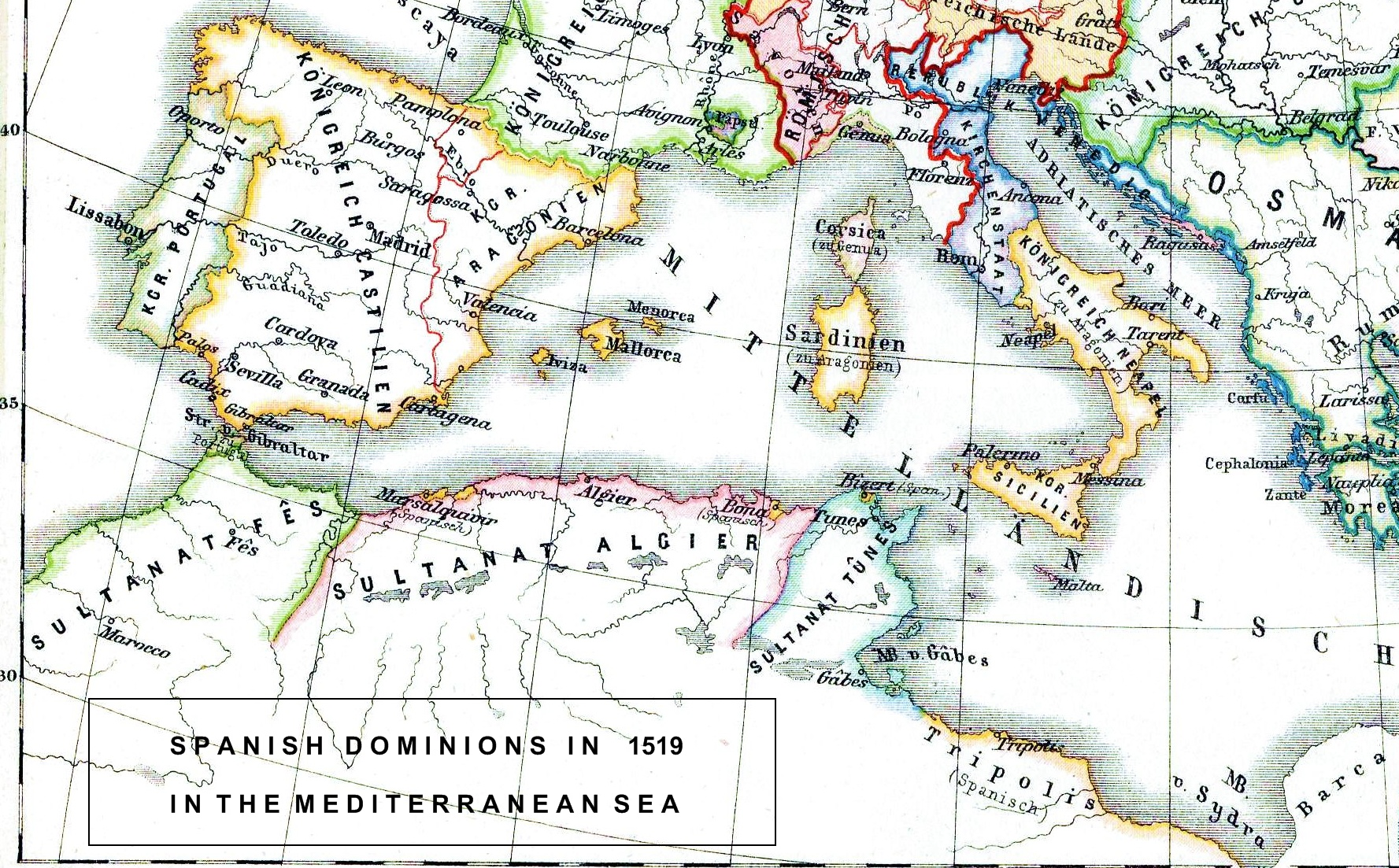
"Plazas fuertes" and possessions of Spain in 1519 in North Africa

After having secured the Canary Islands off the coast of Morocco in 1496, they took a number of bridgeheads on the African mainland, first Melilla (1497), then Cazaza and Mers El Kébir (1505). The between 1508 and 1510 they extended the areas under their control widely, taking in Peñón de Vélez de la Gomera (1508), and then major coastal cities – Oran (1509), Algiers (1510), Béjaïa (1510) as well as Tripoli (1510) and surroundings in coastal Libya. Spain however lacked the military means to extend its area of rule further. This limited success prompted the local Muslim rulers in North Africa to encourage Oruç Reis to attack Spanish positions and stage raids on Andalucia, Valencia and Alicante. In 1516, the year King Ferdinand died, Oruç took Algiers and expelled the Spanish.

Ferdinand's successor Emperor Charles V intended to regain Algiers and end the threat of piracy posed by Oruç. Charles landed at Oran, and Oruç was killed by Spanish forces at Tlemcen in 1518. However Charles was not able to retain control of the areas he had taken, and Oruç's brother Hayreddin Barbarossa secured the protection of the Ottoman Empire by making Algiers its vassal.

By the time Philip II of Spain assumed the throne of Portugal in 1580 as well as of Spain, all of the Spanish possessions on the North African coast had already been lost, with the exceptions of Melilla, Peñón de Vélez de la Gomera, and Oran–Mers El Kébir (Mazalquivir) while only Ceuta, Tangier, Arcila and El Jadida remained of the Portuguese territories. Although Philip III of Spain gained Larache (1610) and La Mámora (1614) in Morocco, the rise of the Alaouite dynasty meant the loss of many former possessions to Muslim rule. By the death of Moulay Ismaíl (1672–1727), the only territories remaining to Spain were Ceuta (acquired from Portugal in 1640), Melilla, the Alhucemas Islands (occupied in 1673) and Peñón de Vélez de la Gomera.

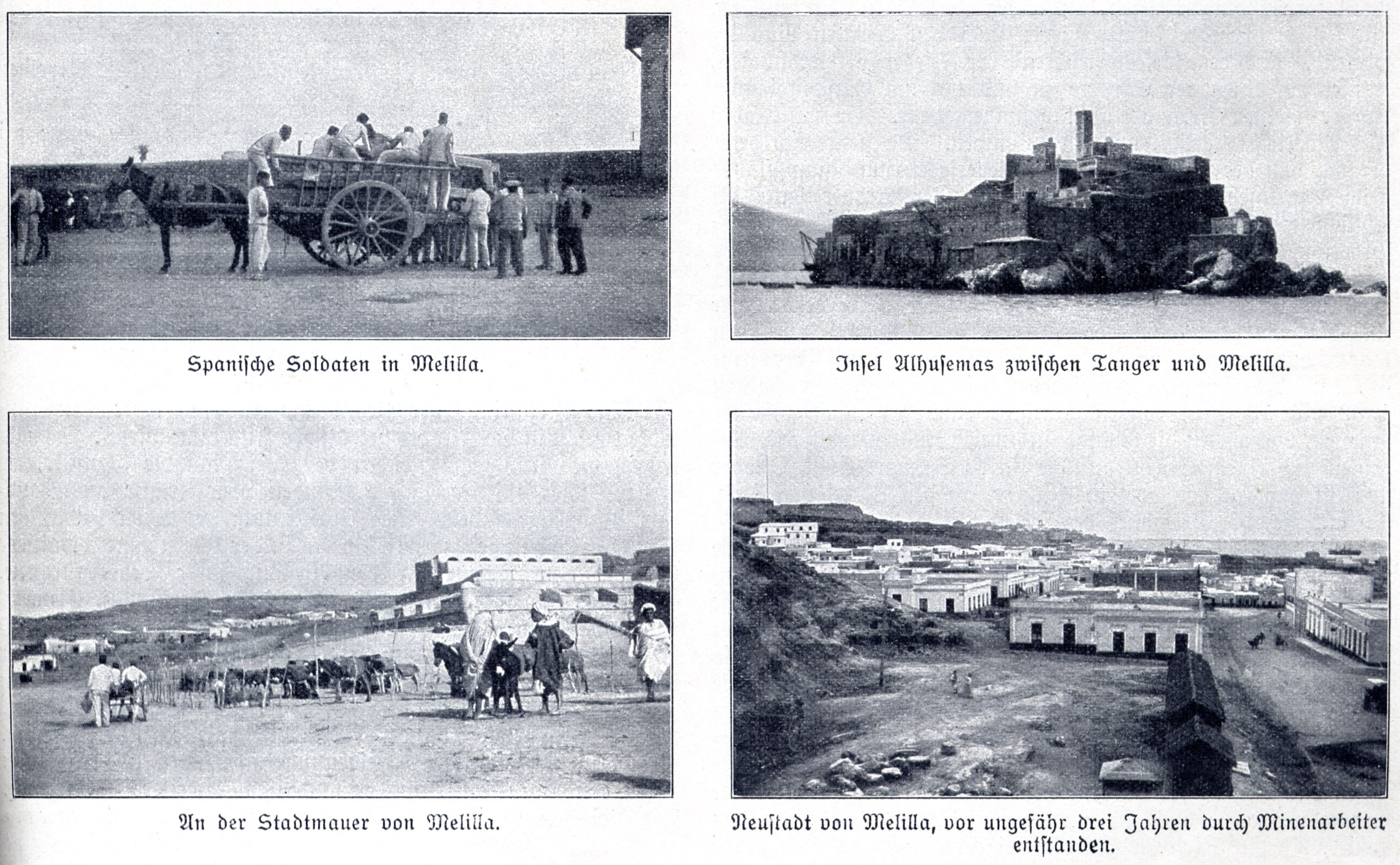
Melilla and the Peñón de Alhucemas in 1909.

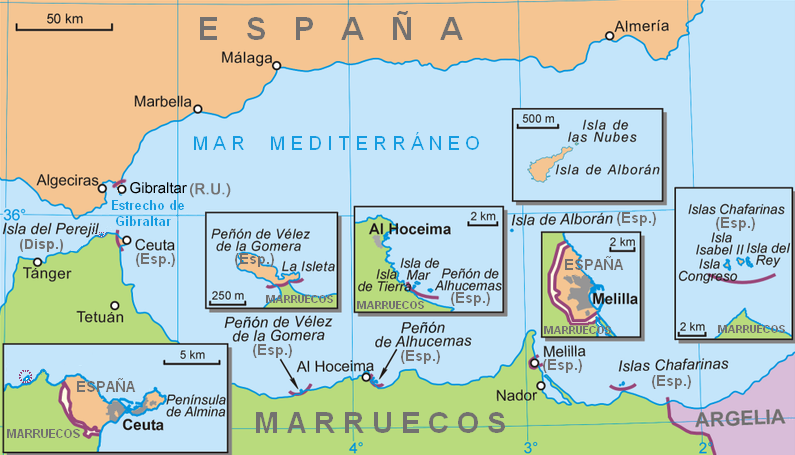
Remaining Spanish Plazas de soberanía in North Africa.

Spain's first Bourbon ruler Philip V wished to re-establish Spanish supremacy on the Algerian coast, and in 1732 sent an expedition which retook Oran and Mers El Kebir. The cities remained under Spanish rule until they were all but destroyed by an earthquake in 1790. The Spanish evacuated it in early 1792 and it came under Ottoman rule once again.

From West to East:

- Dakhla (Dajla, formerly Villa Cisneros) (1502)
- Santa Cruz de la Mar Pequeña (later Puerto Cansado) (1510–1644)
- Mehdya (La Mamora) (1614–1681)
- Larache (1610–1689) and Asilah (Arcila, c. 1604–1691) (both also part of the Spanish protectorate of Morocco 1912–1956)
- Ceuta (since 1640)
- Peñón de Vélez de la Gomera (1508–1522; since 1564)
- Alhucemas Islands (since 1559)
- Cazaza (1505–1533)
- Melilla (since 1497)
- Honaine (Hunaín) (1531–1535)
- Mers El Kébir (Mazalquivir) (1505–1708, 1732–1792)
- Oran (1509–1708, 1732–1791)
- Peñón of Algiers (1510–1529)
- Algiers (Argel) (1510–1516)
- Béjaïa (Bugia) (1510–1555)
- Annaba (Bona) (1535–1540)
- Bizerte (Bizerta) (1535–1573)
- La Goulette (La Goleta) (1535–1574)
- Tunis (Túnez) (1573–1574) (Spanish protectorate from 1535 to 1569 following the campaign of 1535)
- Sousse (Susa) (1537–1574)
- Monastir (1550–1554)
- Mahdia (1550–1553)
- Djerba (Yerba) (1521–1524 and 1559–1560)
- Tripoli (1510–1530; then ceded to the Knights Hospitaller, finally lost in 1551)

== French possessions ==
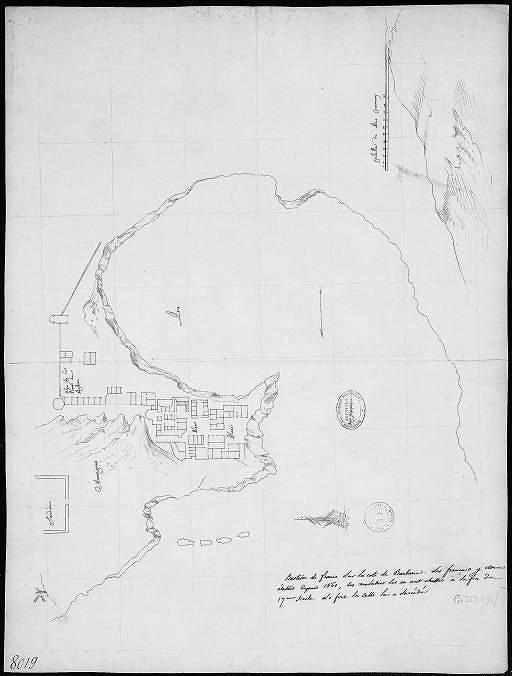
Sketch of the Bastion de France

The Franco-Ottoman alliance of 1536 set the scene for the earliest French possessions on the North African coast. In 1550 the Dey of Algiers, Turgut Reis, granted the right to fish coral on the Massacares coast, near Annaba, to Tomasino Lenche (c.1510–1568), a merchant of Marseille. The following year, Henry II of France granted him an identical monopoly (renewed in 1560 by Charles IX). Sultan Selim II granted France a trading concession over the ports of Malfacarel, la Calla (El Kala), Collo, Cap Rose (Cap Rosa) and Bone (Annaba). In 1552 Lenche was given permission to build the first permanent French presence on the coast, the fortress known as the 'Bastion de France'.

Tomasino Lenche completed the building of the Bastion de France in 1560 and founded the Magnificent Coral Company (la Magnifique Compagnie du Corail) for the commercial exploitation of the coast's resources. From this base, it was not long before Tomasino had diversified into selling artillery, powder and other weapons to the Dey. The wealth of the Lenches attracted the envy of Algiers, however, which seized the Bastion in 1564. Lenche was able to re-establish himself there after a period, but in June 1604, the Bastion de France was torn down by soldiers from Annaba supported by galleys from Algiers sent by raïs Mourad. The fortress was eventually returned to the Lenches after diplomatic intervention by Henry IV of France. Another Algerian attack was staged in 1615, but the following year captain Jacques Vinciguerra reasserted Lenche control. Eventually, in 1619, Tomaso II Lenche sold his rights to the bastion to Charles, Duke of Guise.

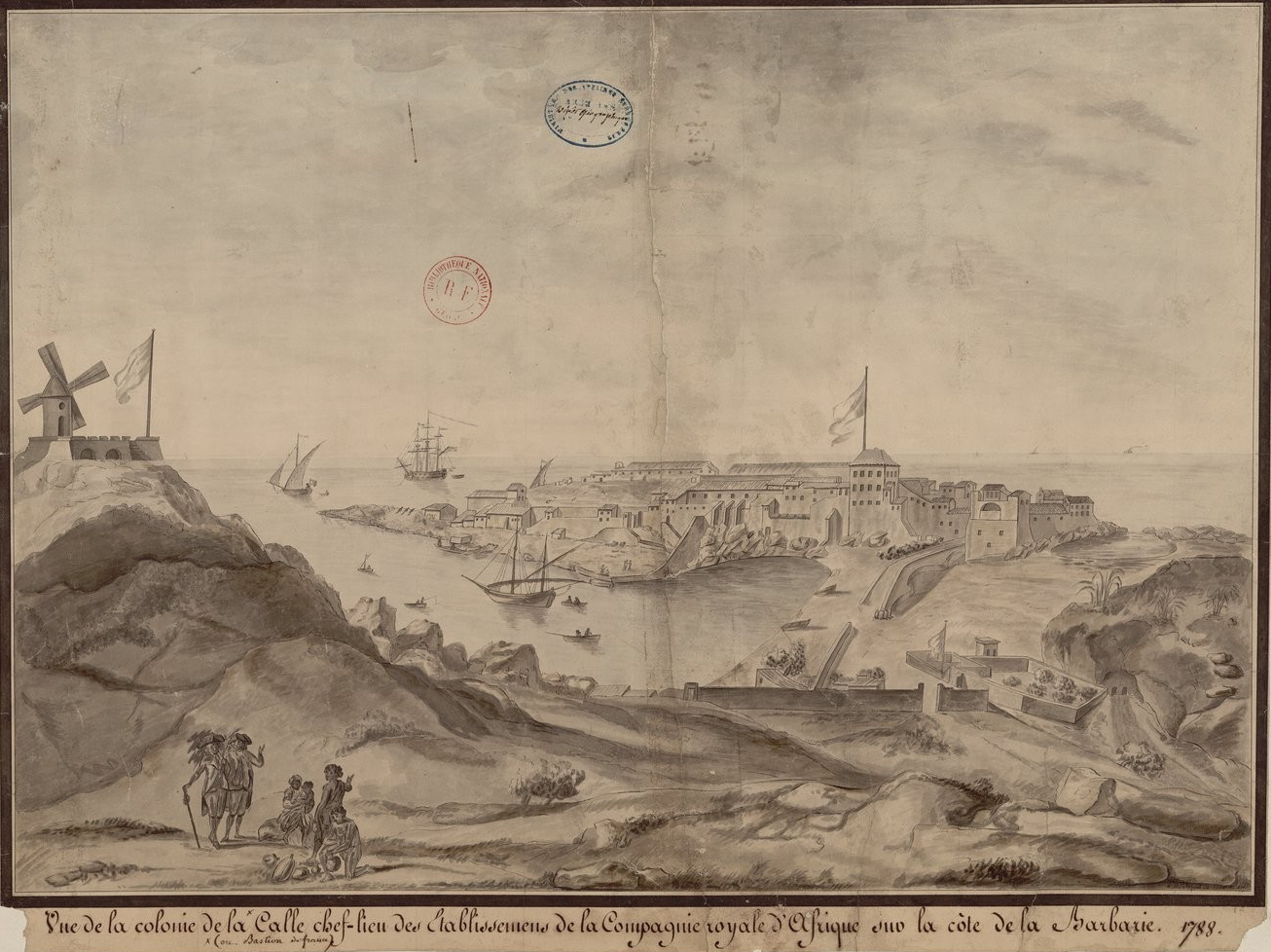
View of the colony of El Kala (La Calle), 1788. At this time the Bastion had come under the control of the French Royal Africa Company and was no longer run as a private concession

After nearly a decade, on 19 September 1628, Sanson Napollon, heir to the Lenche fortunes, signed a commercial treaty with Algiers and revived the trading posts at Annaba, La Calle and the Bastion de France. As well as harvesting coral, he also opened a trading post dealing in wheat at Cap Rosa. In 1631 Louis XIII named Napollon governor of the Bastion, making it thereafter a property of the crown rather than of the Duke of Guise. However Napollon was killed during a Genoese attack in 1633, and in 1637 an Algerian fleet under Ali Bitchin seized and destroyed all the French and trading posts along the coast.

In 1664, Louis XIV mounted an expedition (known as the Djidjelli expedition) to take the city of Jijel and use it as a base against piracy. The city was taken, but after holding it for just three months, the French retreated, abandoning it. In 1682 and again in 1683 Admiral Duquesne bombarded Algiers as part of France's campaigns against piracy, and in 1684 the Dey of Algiers signed a new treaty with de Tourville. French possession of the Bastion de France was confirmed for 100 years, and previous rights in La Calle, Cap Rose, Annaba, and Béjaïa were restored.

The 1684 treaty also transferred these rights from Napollon to M. Denis Dussault, before, under another treaty signed in 1690, all rights in these concessions were assigned to the French Africa Company. The French Africa Company promptly abandoned the Bastion and based its trade in la Calle, where it continued to operate until it was wound up in 1799. In 1807 the Dey of Algiers ceded all former French rights for trading posts and bases to the United Kingdom, and they were not restored to France until the Congress of Vienna. During the diplomatic crisis of 1827 between Algiers and France, the French abandoned la Calle, and the Algerians promptly destroyed it. These events were the prelude to the French conquest of Algeria in 1830.

== English possessions ==
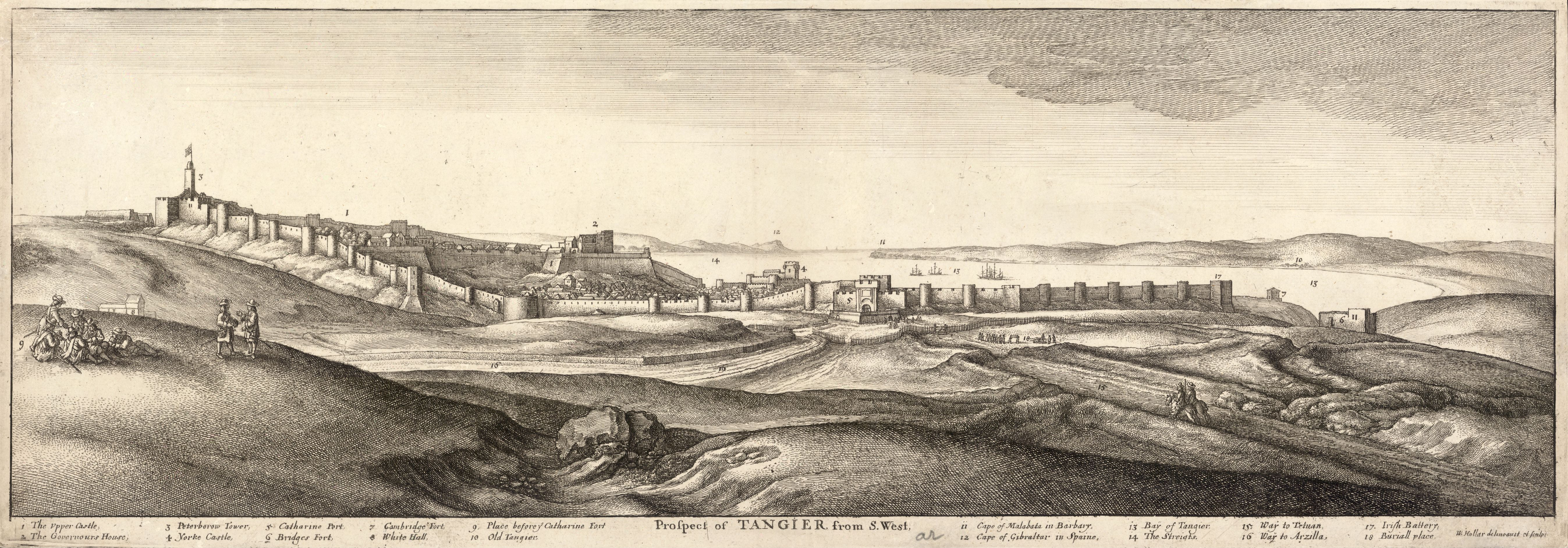
English Tangier circa 1670 by Wenceslaus Hollar

Tangier (1661–1684) was ceded to England by Portugal as part of the dowry for Catherine of Braganza when she married Charles II of England. However the enclave was expensive to defend and fortify against the attacks by Moulay Ismail and offered neither commercial nor military advantage to England. In February 1684 the English troops were transported home, the walls were torn down, and the mole in the harbour destroyed.

== Gallery ==
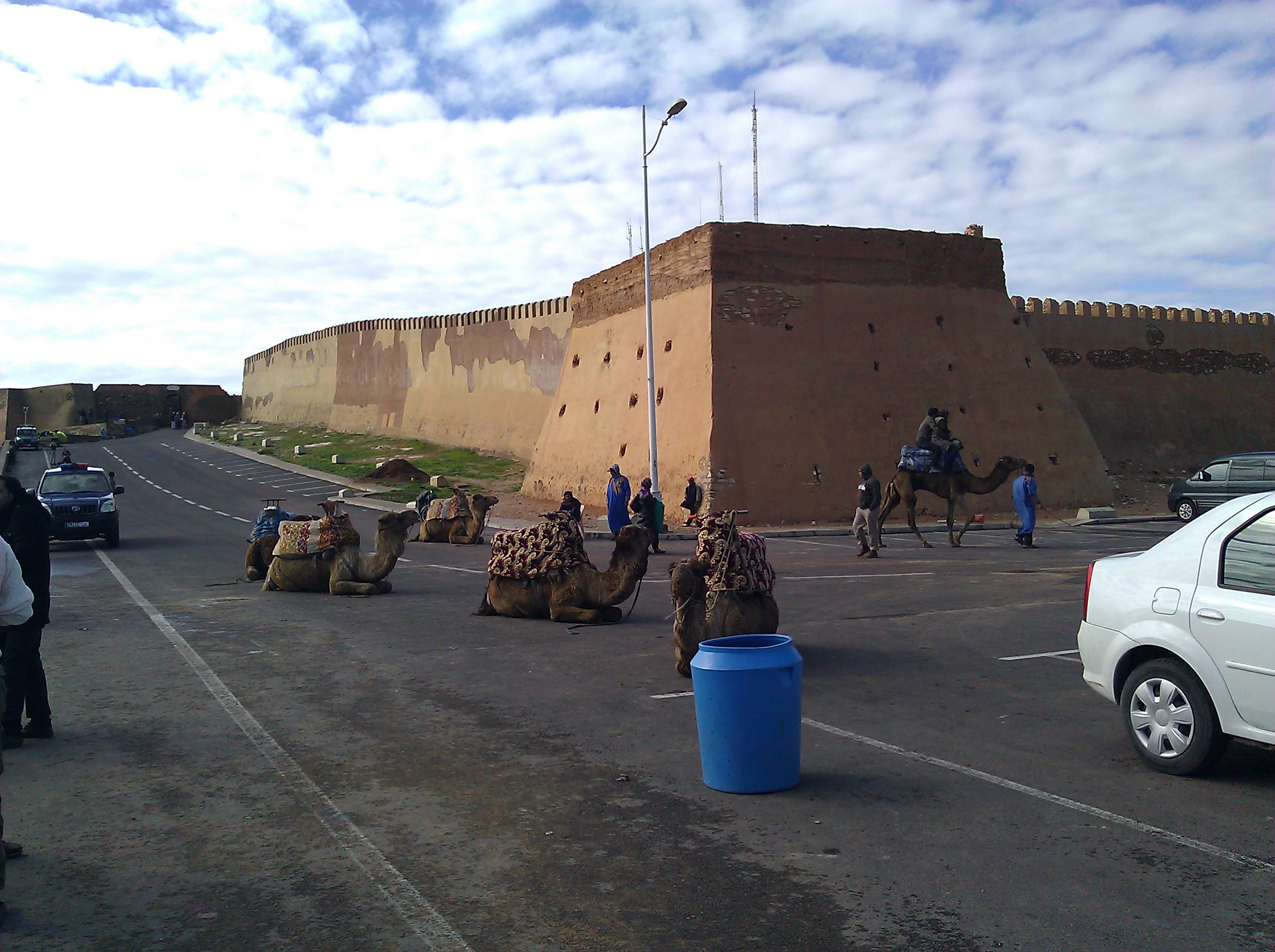
Fortifications of Agadir

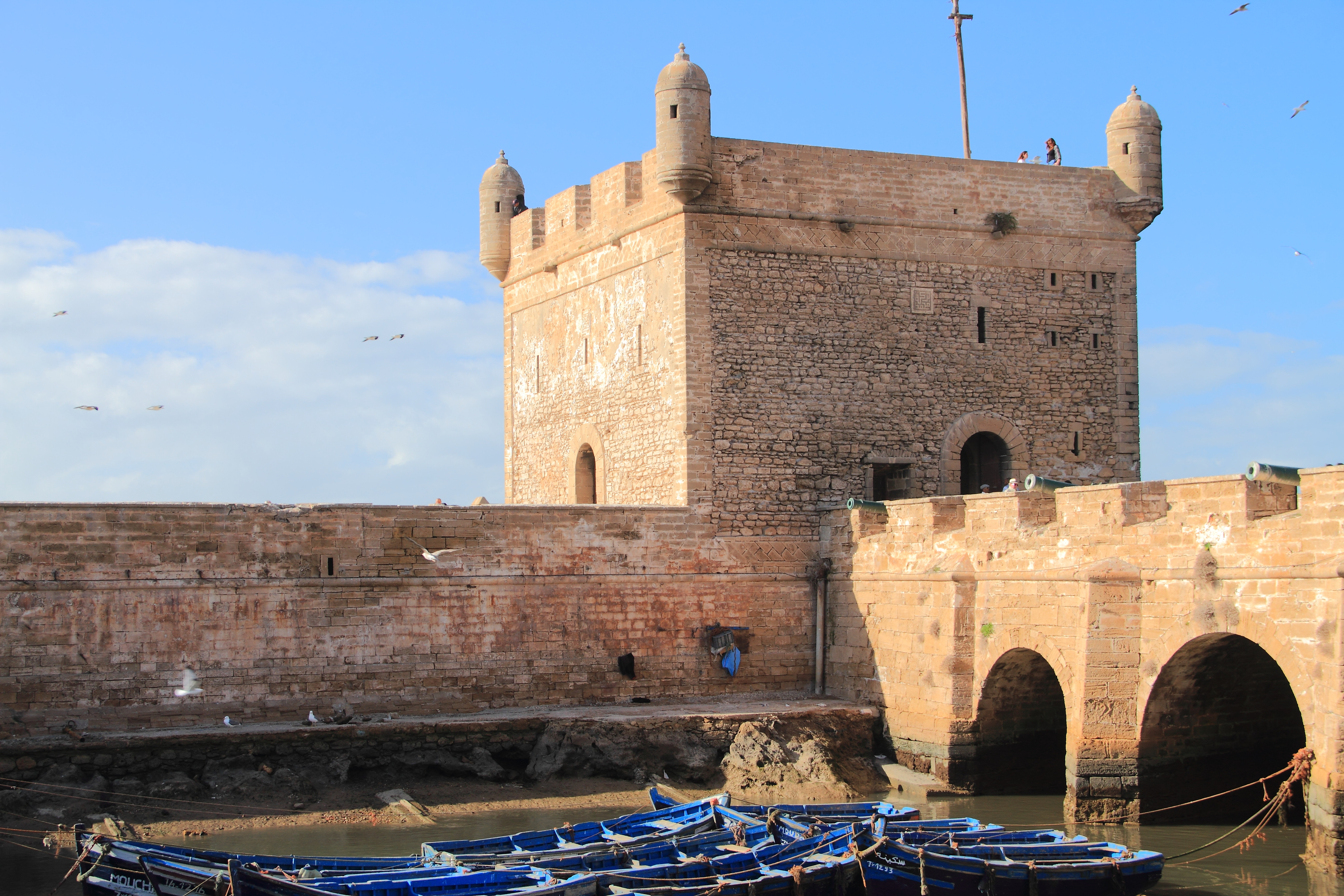
Portuguese fort of Essaouira

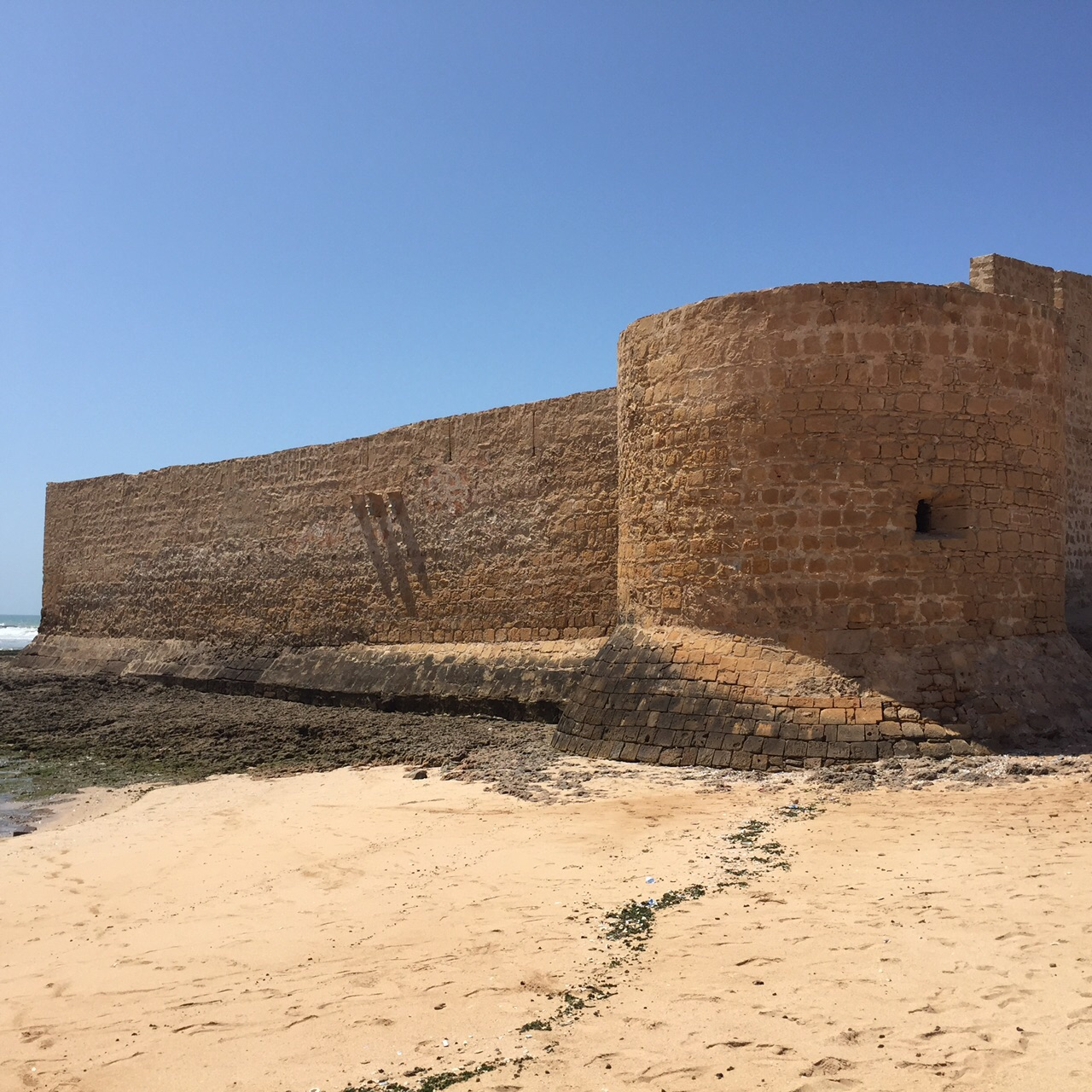
Fort of Souira Guedima

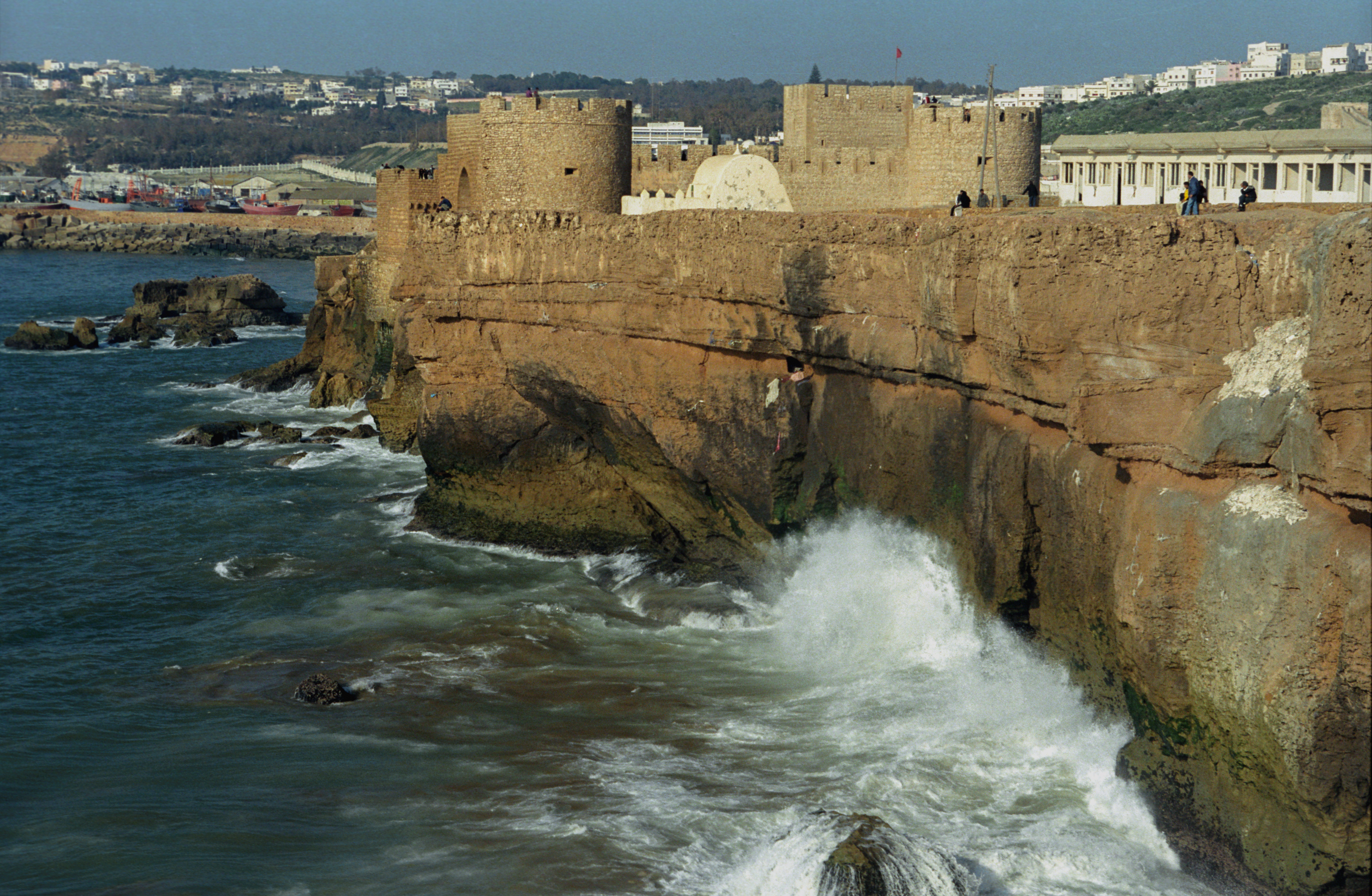
Sea walls of Safi

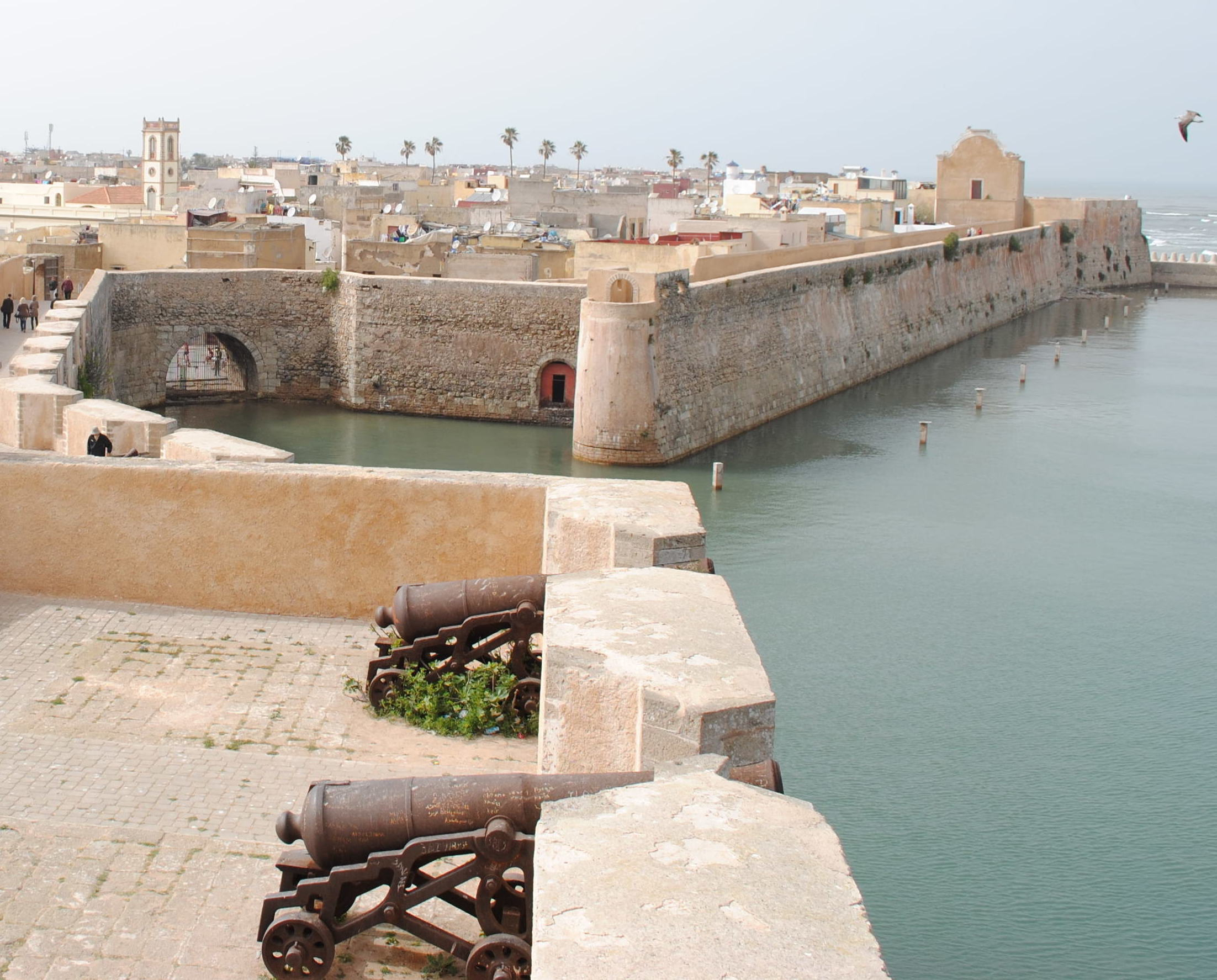
Citadel of El Jadida

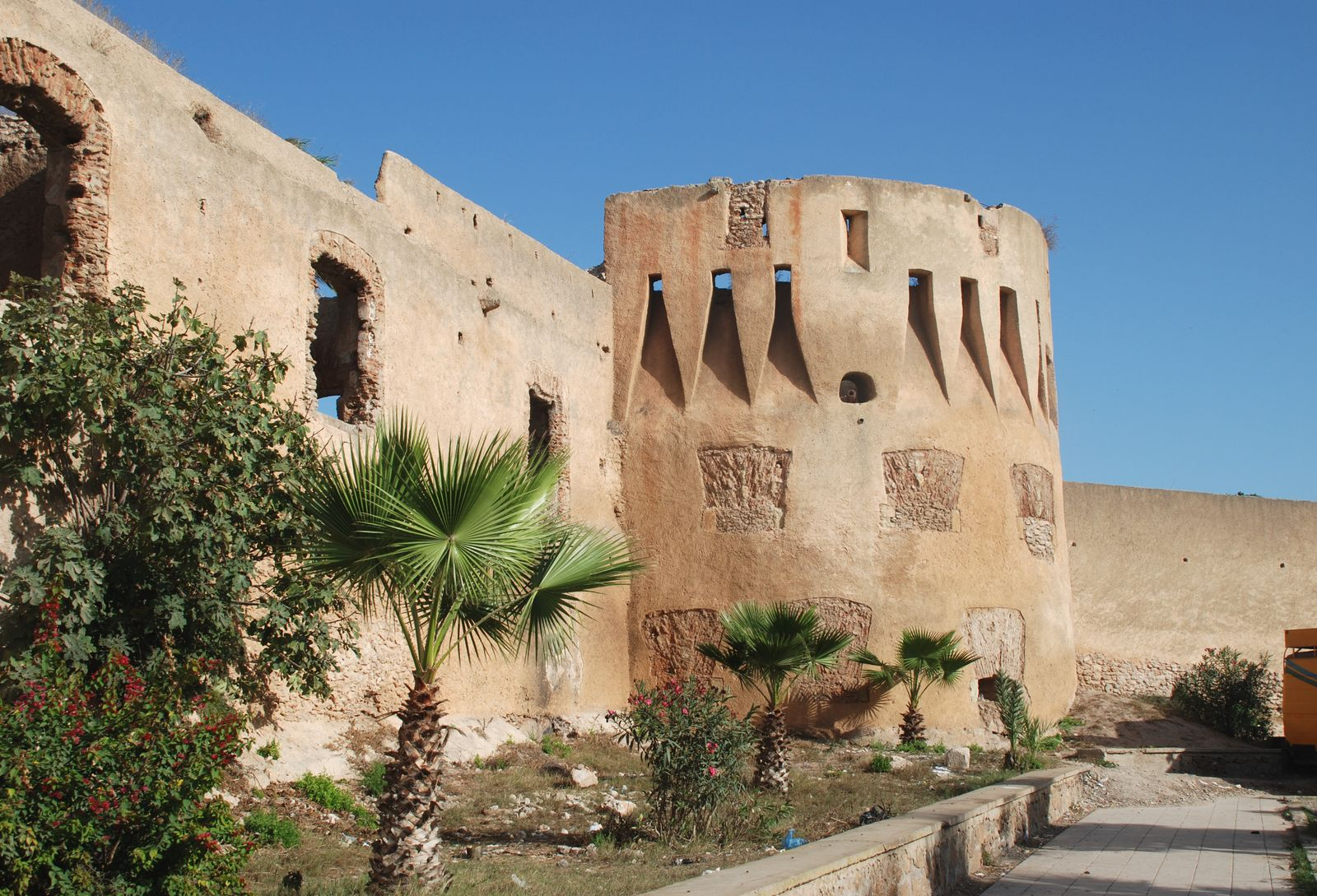
Walls of Azemmour

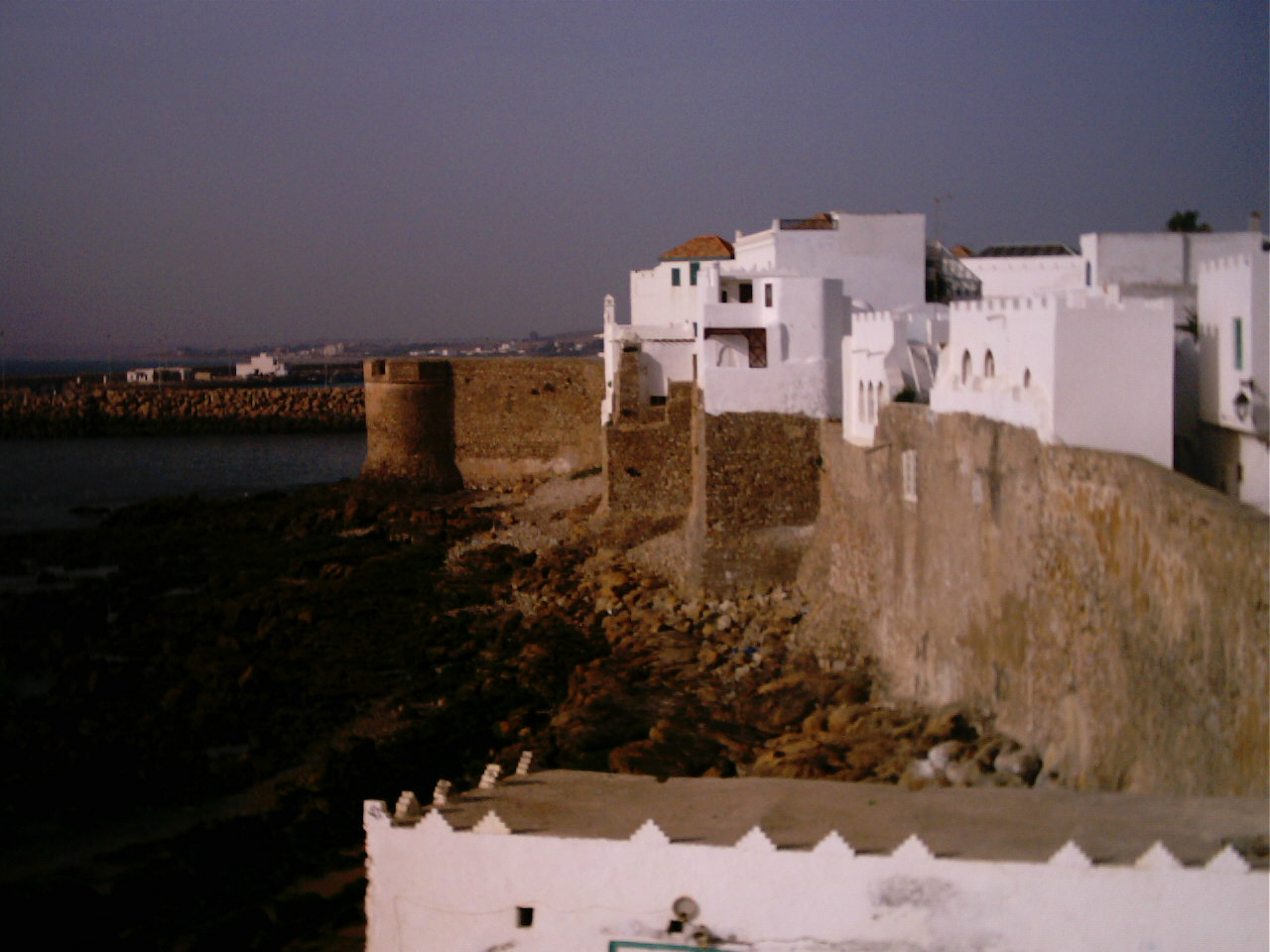
Sea walls of Asilah

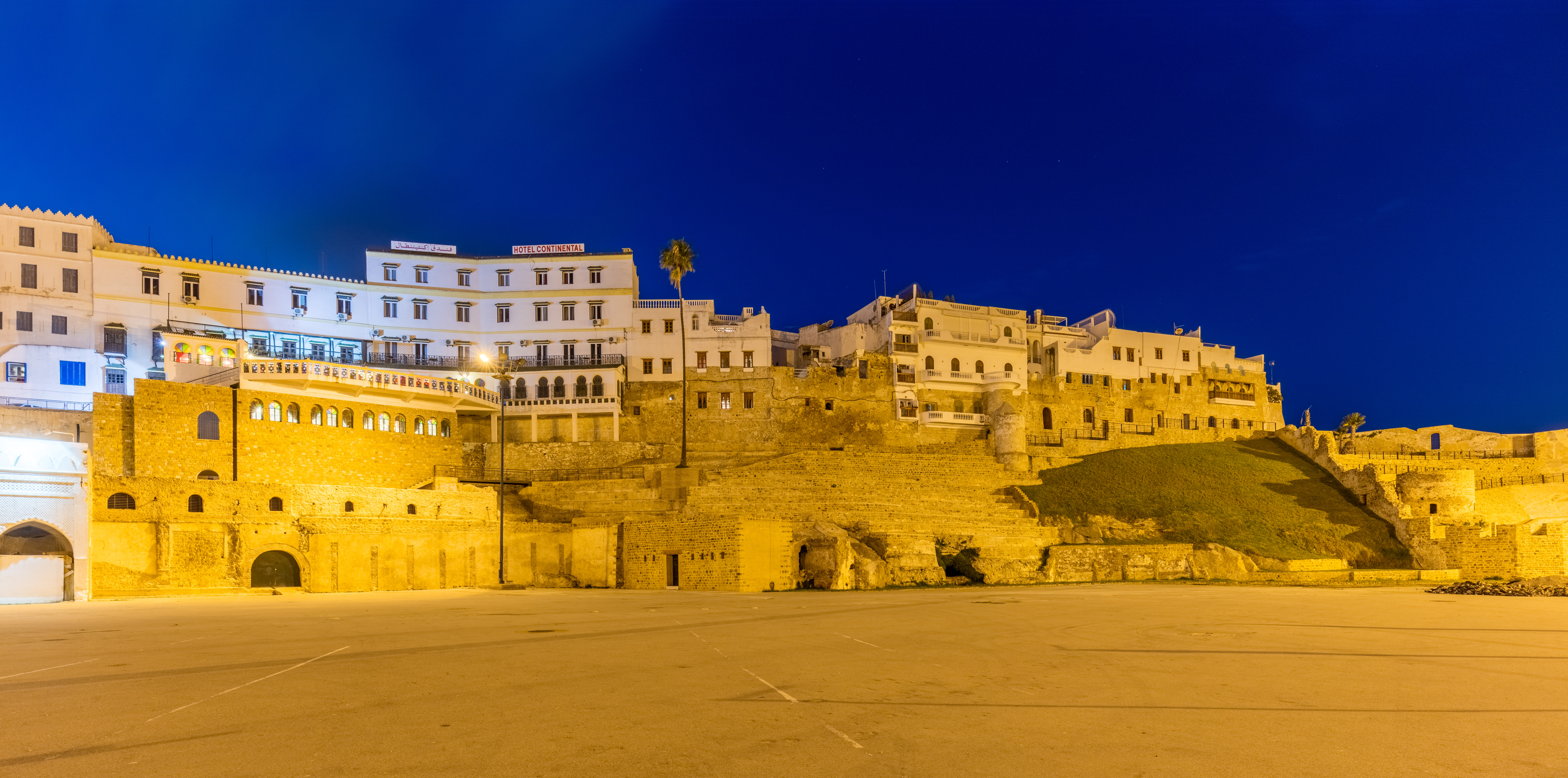
City walls of Tangier

Royal Walls of Ceuta

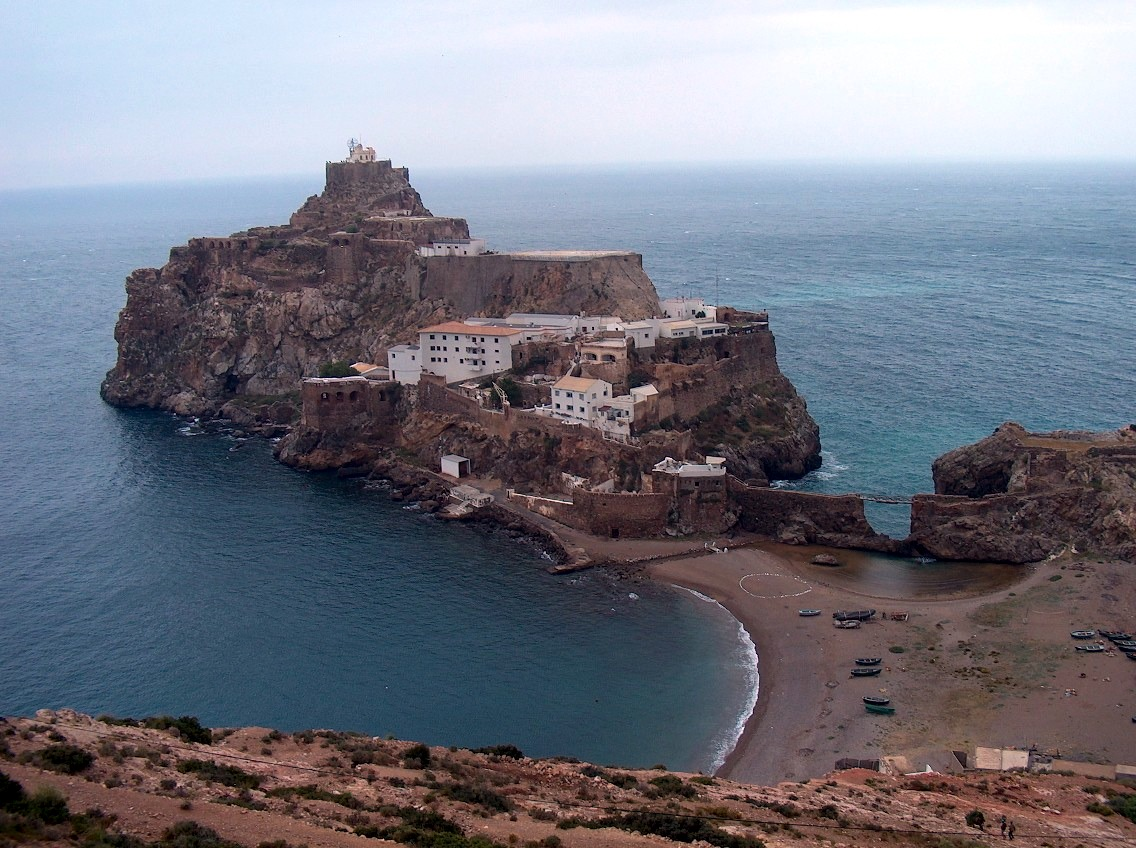
Peñón de Vélez

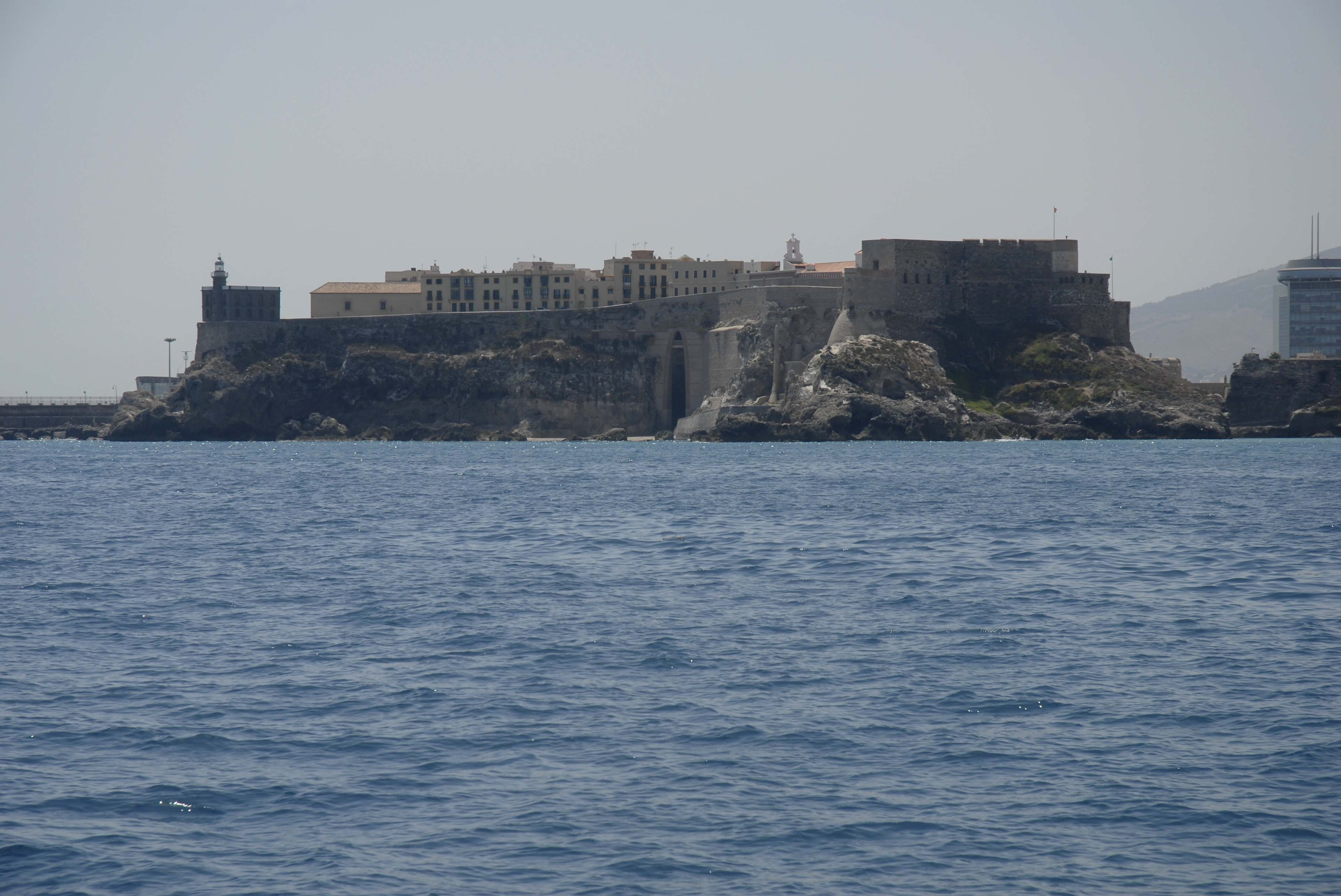
Melilla

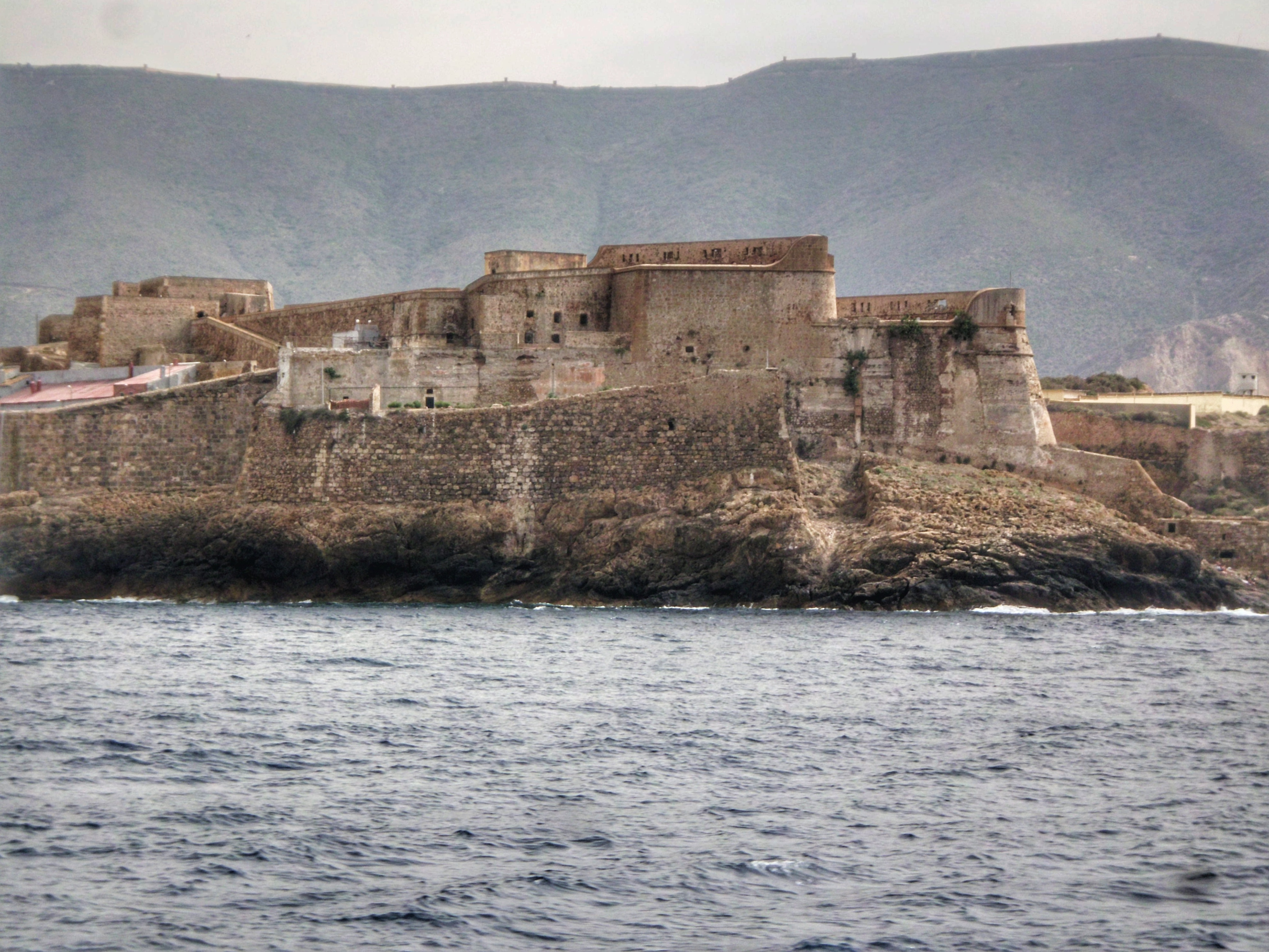
Mers El Kébir

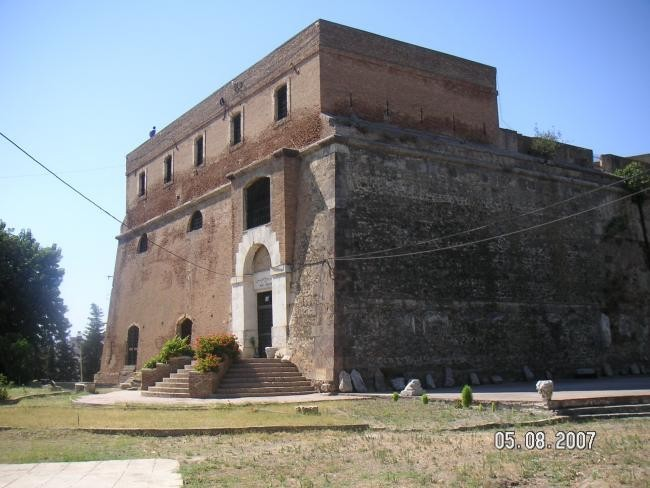
Spanish fort (Bordj Moussa) in Béjaïa

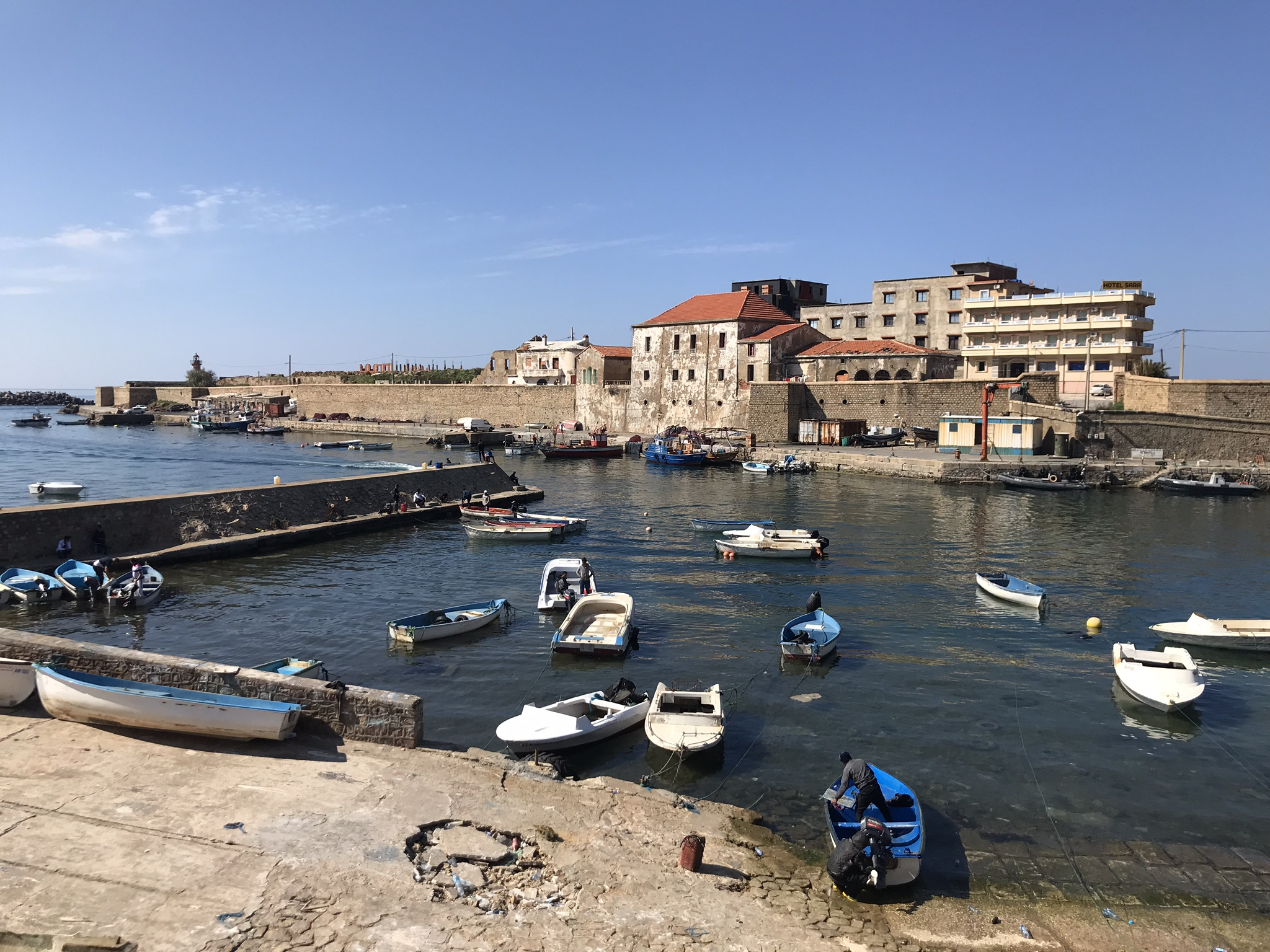
El Kala or La Calle, formerly Bastion de France

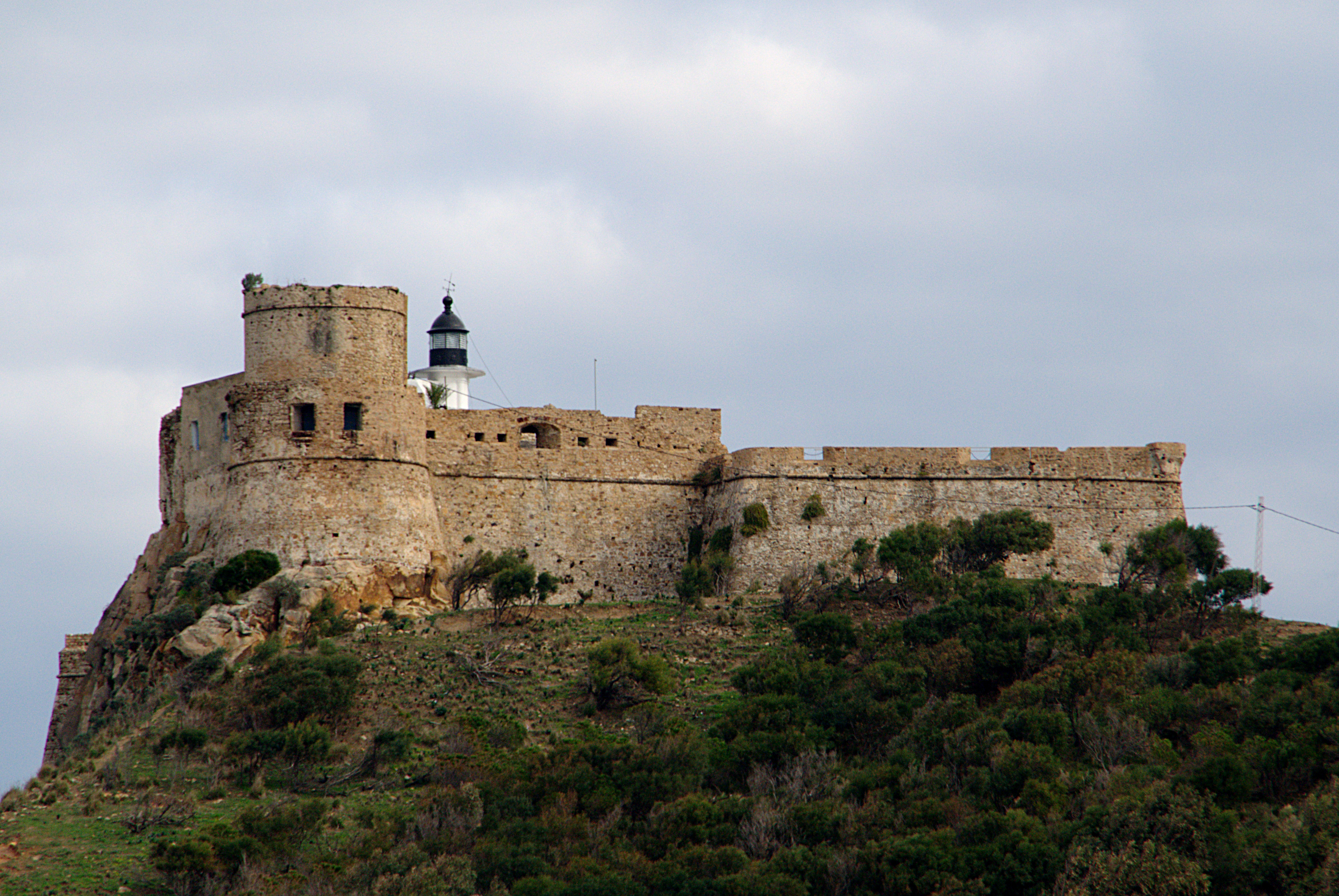
Genoese fort of Tabarka

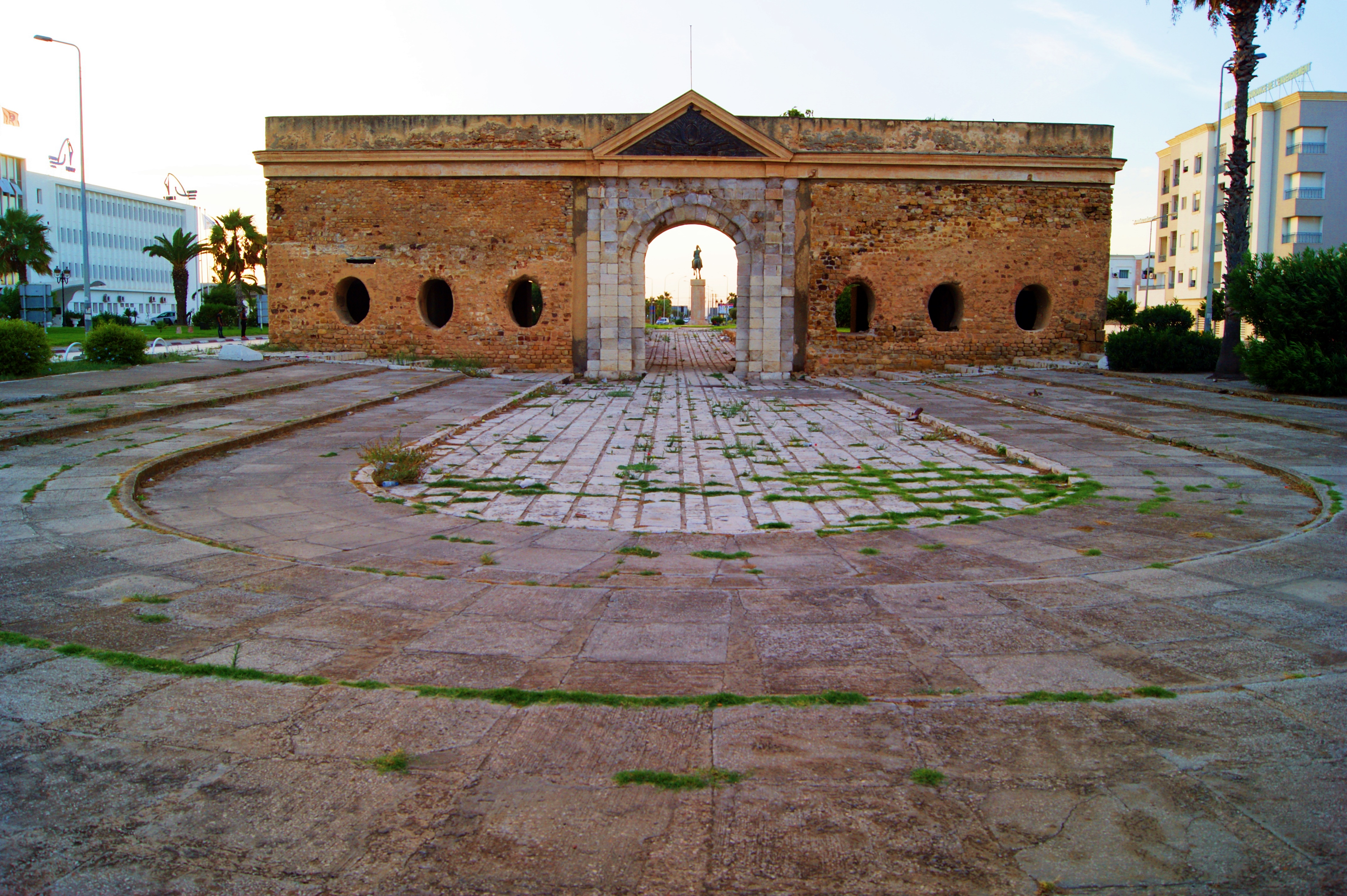
La Goulette

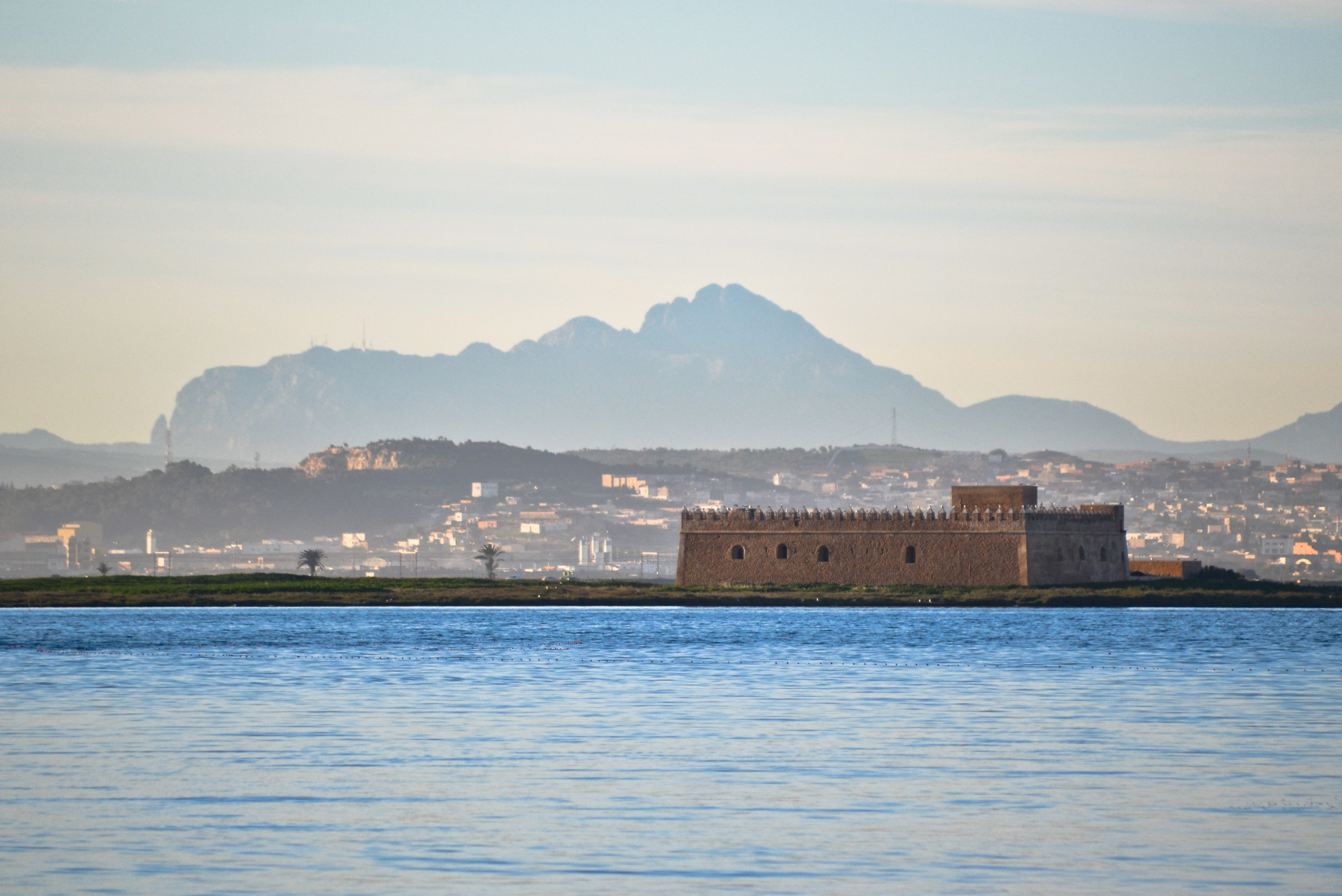
Spanish fort of Chikly Island on the Lake of Tunis

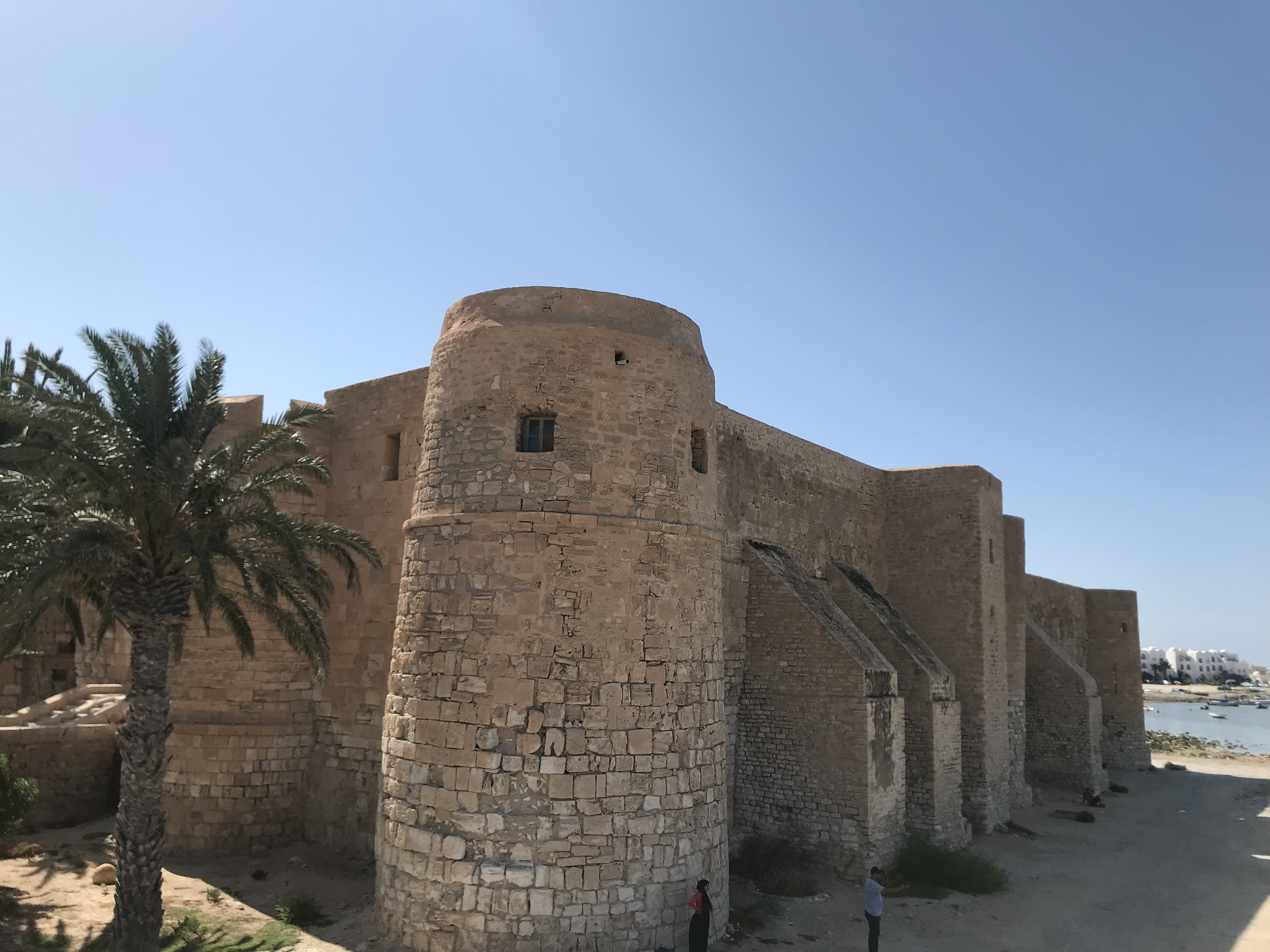
Borj El Kebir in Djerba

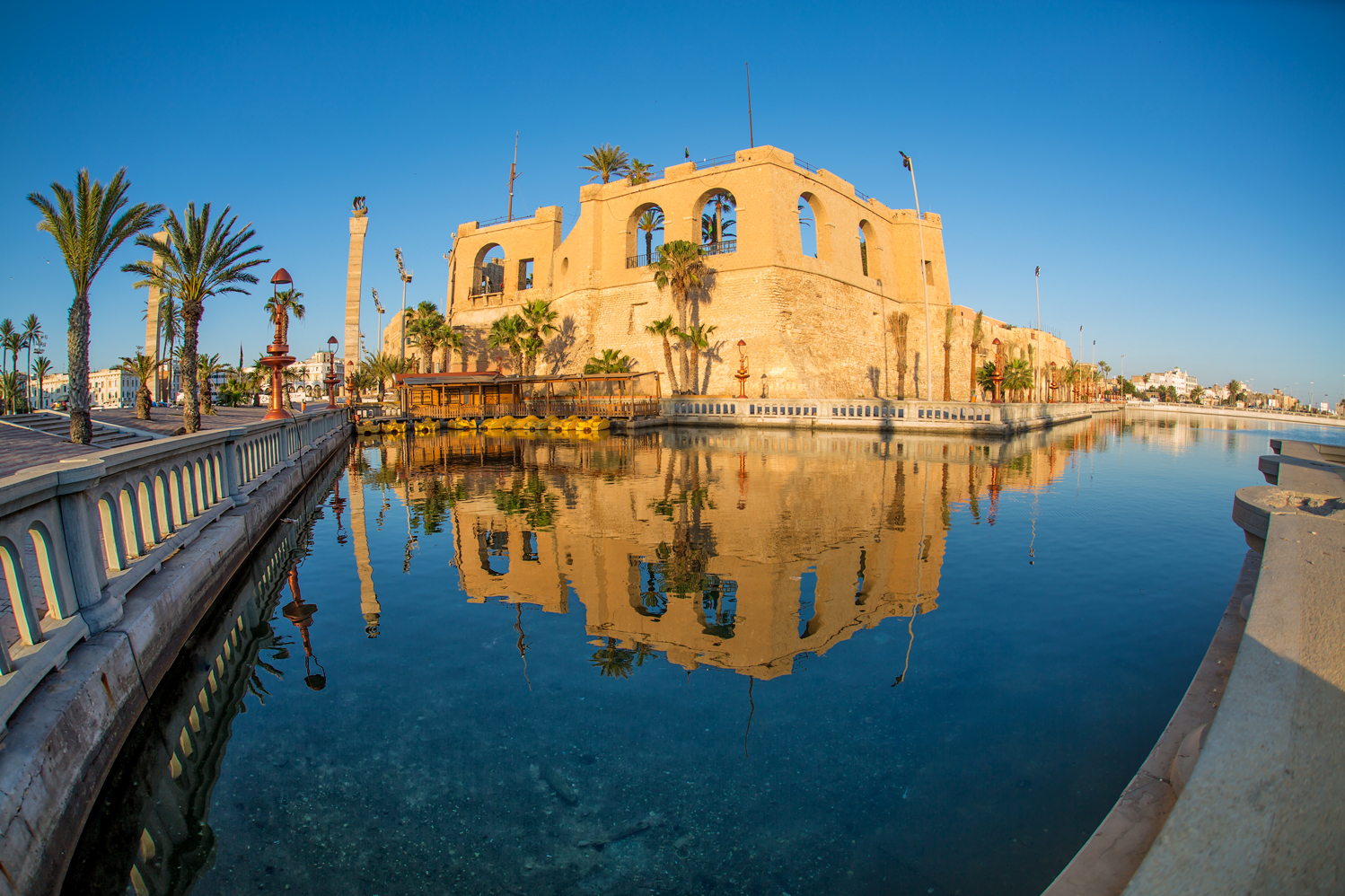
Red Castle of Tripoli

== See also ==
- Spanish Empire
- Presidio
- Plazas de soberanía

== Bibliography ==
- Alonso Acero, Beatriz. Orán-Mazalquivir, 1589–1639: una sociedad en la frontera de Berbería. Editor: Consejo Superior de Investigaciones Científicas. Madrid, 2000.
- Bunes Ibarra, Miguel Ángel de (1989). La imagen de los musulmanes y del Norte de África en la España de los siglos XVI y XVII: los caracteres de una hostilidad. Madrid: Consejo Superior de Investigaciones Científicas. ISBN 84-00-06957-9.
- Ciment, James (2003). Melvin E. Page; Penny M. Sonnenburg (eds.). "Casablanca". Colonialism: An International, Social, Cultural, and Political Encyclopedia. A-M. Vol. 1, Volumen 2. Santa Barbara, California, Denver and Oxford: ABC-CLIO: 103–104. ISBN 1-57607-335-1.
- Coates, Timothy J. (2001). Convicts and Orphans: Forced and State-sponsored Colonizers in the Portuguese Empire, 1550-1755. Stanford, California: Stanford University Press. ISBN 0-8047-3359-7.
- Correia, Jorge; Principe, Alberto Darias (2013). Víctor Manuel Mínguez Cornelles (ed.). "Territorialidad y urbanismo: estrategias de la presencia portuguesa en África septentrional" (PDF). Las Artes y la Arquitectura del Poder: 1027–1038. ISBN 978-84-8021-938-9.
- Devezas, Tessaleno; Modelski, George (2008). George Modelski; Tessaleno Devezas; William R. Thompson (eds.). "The Portuguese as system-builders: Technological innovation in early globalization". Globalization as Evolutionary Process: Modeling Global Change. Rethinking Globalizations. Londres and New York City: Routledge: 30–57. ISBN 978-0-203-93729-7.
- Elbl, M. Reclaiming Walls: The Fortified Médina of Tangier under Portuguese Rule (1471–1661) and as a Modern Heritage Artefact. Portuguese Studies Review 15 (1–2) (2007; publ. 2009)
- Elbl, Martin M. (2000). James D. Tracy (ed.). "Portuguese urban fortifications in Morocco: Borrowing, adaptation, and innovation along a military frontier". City Walls: The Urban Enceinte in Global Perspective. Cambridge University Press: 349–385. ISBN 0-521-65221-9.
- Elbl, Martin (2013). Portuguese Tangier (1471-1662): Colonial Urban Fabric as Cross-Cultural Skeleton. Baywolf Press. ISBN 978-0921437-50-5.
- Fey, H. Historia de Orán: antes, durante y después de la dominación española. Editorial Algazara. Málaga, 1999
- García, José Manuel (2003). Breve Historia dos Descobrimentos e Expansão de Portugal. Lisboa: Presença. ISBN 9722325248.
- Iglesias Rodríguez, Juan-José (2013). "Las entradas de cristianos en Berbería (siglos XV-XVI). Relaciones pacíficas y violentas" (PDF). Revista de Historia de el Puerto (50): 9–34. ISSN 1130-4340.
- Kamen, Henry. Imperio (el imperio español) Editorial Santillana. Madrid, 1990 ISBN 84-03-09316-0
- Levtzion, Nehemia (1977). Roland Oliver (ed.). "The western Maghrib and Sudan". The Cambridge History of Africa. 3. Cambridge University Press: 331–462. doi:10.1017/CHOL9780521209816.007. ISBN 0-521-20981-1.
- López de Coca Castañer, José Enrique (2001). "Portugal y los "derechos" castellanos sobre Granada (siglo XV)". Acta Historica et Archaeologica Mediaevalia (22): 601–616. ISSN 0212-2960.
- Livermore, H.V. (1947). A History of Portugal. Cambridge University Press.
- Martínez Ruiz, José Ignacio (2005). "De Tánger a Gibraltar: el estrecho en la praxis comercial e imperial británica (1661–1776)". Hispania. 65 (221): 1043–1062. doi:10.3989/hispania.2005.v65.i221.132. hdl:11441/55845.
- Park, Thomas K.; Boum, Aomar (2005). Historical Dictionary of Morocco. Lanham, Maryland, Toronto and Oxford: Scarecrow Press. p. 81. ISBN 0810865114.
- Rodríguez Hernández, Antonio José (2015). "La Ciudad de Ceuta y la Monarquía Hispánica (1640-1700)" (PDF). Erasmo: Revista de Historia bajomedieval y moderna. 2. Valladolid: Universidad de Valladolid: 80–100. ISSN 2341-2380. Archived from the original (PDF) on 2016-03-04.
- Russell-Wood, AJ. The Portuguese Empire 1415–1808. Johns Hopkins University Press| London, 1998 ISBN 0-8018-5955-7 ()
- Sánchez Doncel, Gregorio. Presencia de España en Orán, 1509–1792. Estudio teológico de San Ildefonso. Editorial I.T. San Ildefonso. Madrid, 1991 ISBN 8460076148
- Sarmento, João (2011). Fortifications, Post-colonialism and Power: Ruins and Imperial Legacies. Farnham and Burlington: Ashgate Publishing Limited. ISBN 978-1-4094-0303-6.
- Tescione, Giovanni. Italiani alla pesca del corallo. Editoriale Fiorentino. Napoli, 1968
- White, Lorraine (2004–2005). "Dom Jorge Mascarenhas, Marquês de Montalvão (1579?–1652) and Changing Traditions of Service in Portugal and the Portuguese Empire". Portuguese Studies Review. 12 (2): 63–84. ISSN 1057-1515.
