= El Kala =

Coordinates: 36°54′N 8°27′E

El Kala القالة
- Town
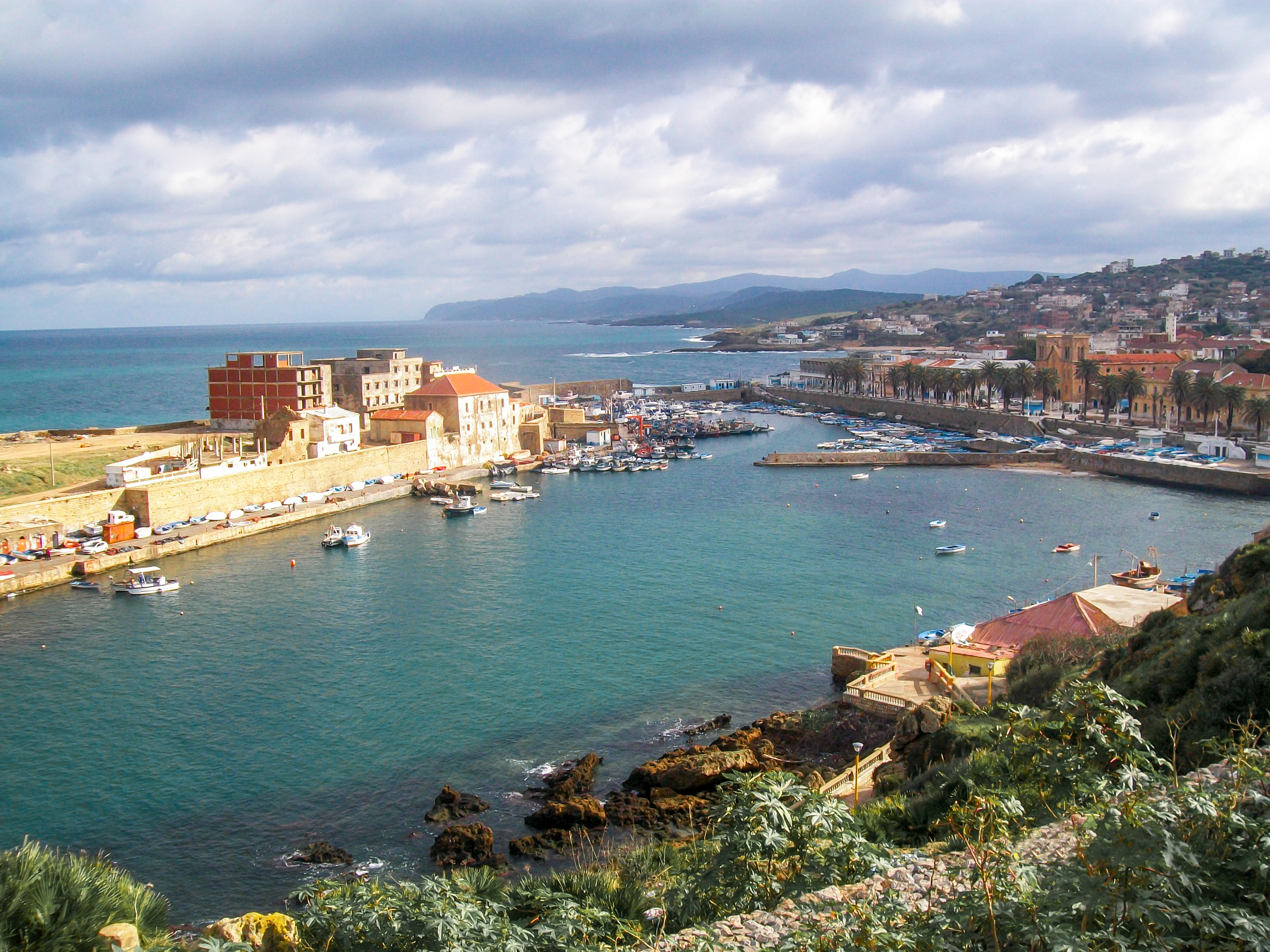
- View on the fishing harbor at El Kala
- Interactive map of El Kala

El Kala (Arabic: القالة) is a seaport of Algeria, in El Tarf Province, 56 miles (90 km) by rail east of Annaba and 10 miles (16 km) west of the Tunisian frontier. It is the centre of the Algerian and Tunisian coral fisheries and has an extensive industry in the curing of sardines. The harbor is small and exposed to the northeast and west winds.

El Kala attracts tourists from within and outside the country, especially during the summer. It is home to an exceptional ecosystem and was declared a biosphere reserve by UNESCO in 1990.

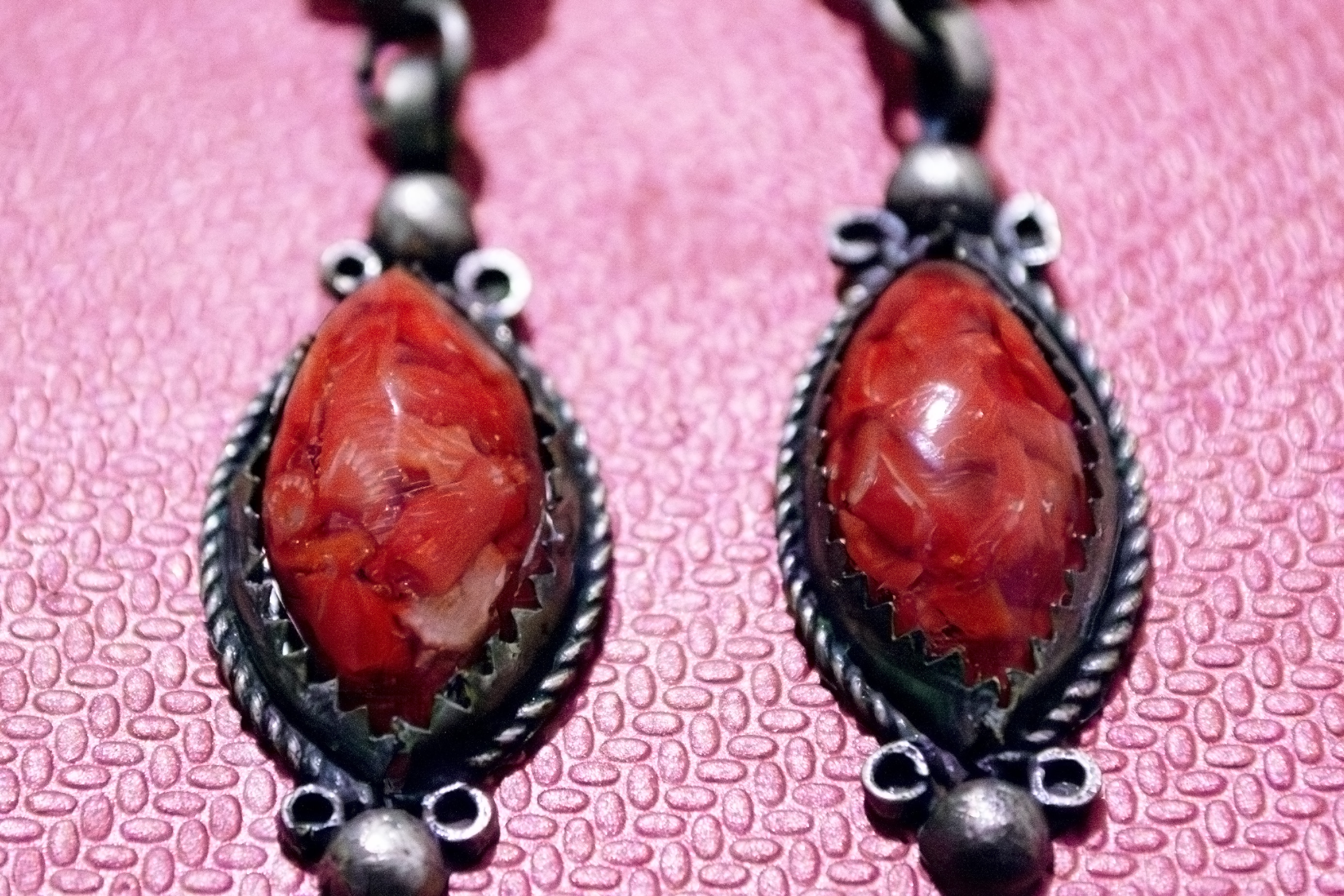
Traditional Algerian Kabyle jewelry made from El Kala's red sponge coral and native silver

== History ==
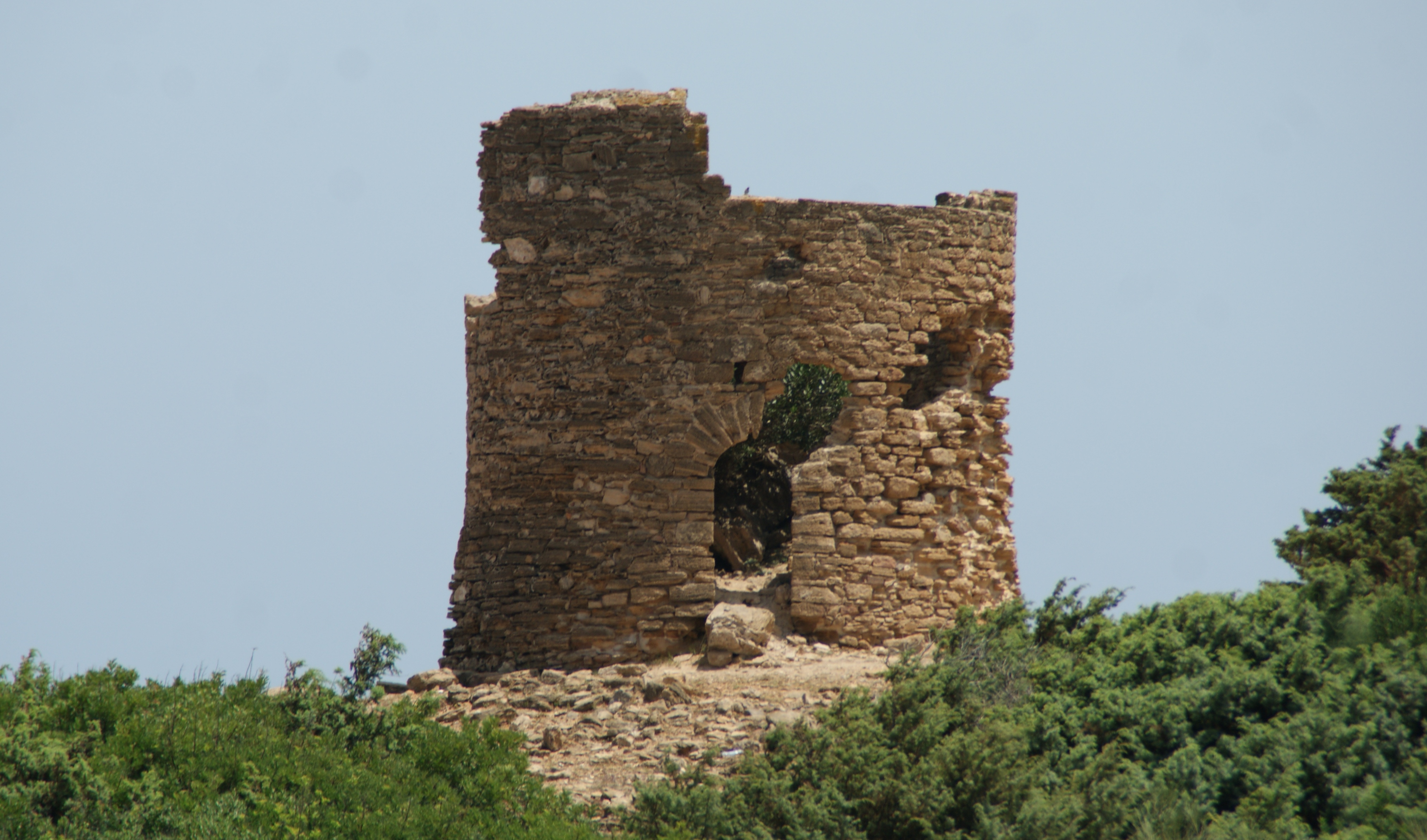
Ruins of Bastion de France, a 16th-century trading post by French merchants

Thinisa in Numidia was an ancient city in the Roman province of Numidia. It was important enough to become a bishopric. The old fortified town was built on a rocky peninsula about 400 metres long, connected with the mainland by a sand bank.

La Calle from the times of its earliest records in the 10th century was the residence of coral merchants.

After the Umayyad conquest of North Africa in the late 6th century and early 7th century, the city became part of the Umayyad Caliphate, and later the Abbasid Caliphate.

Al-Idrisi described the city in the 12th century:

"To the north of Beja, along the edge of the salty sea, lies the city of Marsa al-Kharz, and between them is a big marhala [1-day journey]. It is a small city surrounded by a strong fortress wall, with a kasbah and many Arabs living around it. The people of the city are involved in coral fishing due to its abundance there, which is considered superior to all the coral found in other regions, such as Sicily, Ceuta, and others. [..] Traders from all over the lands come to this city, and much of the coral is exported to various regions. The coral mines of this city are worked every year, and fifty (less or more) boats are made at all times, with about twenty men working on each boat. The coral grows like trees at the bottom of the sea and then hardens. It is caught using tools with many strings made of hemp, which are operated from the tops of the boats. The strings wind around the coral plants, and the men pull them up, extracting large amounts, which are sold for great sums of money. The livelihood of the people is based on this trade. The inhabitants drink from wells, as the land around the city has little cultivation. Their food is brought from the surrounding desert regions of the Arabs, and occasionally fruits are brought from Bone and other places."

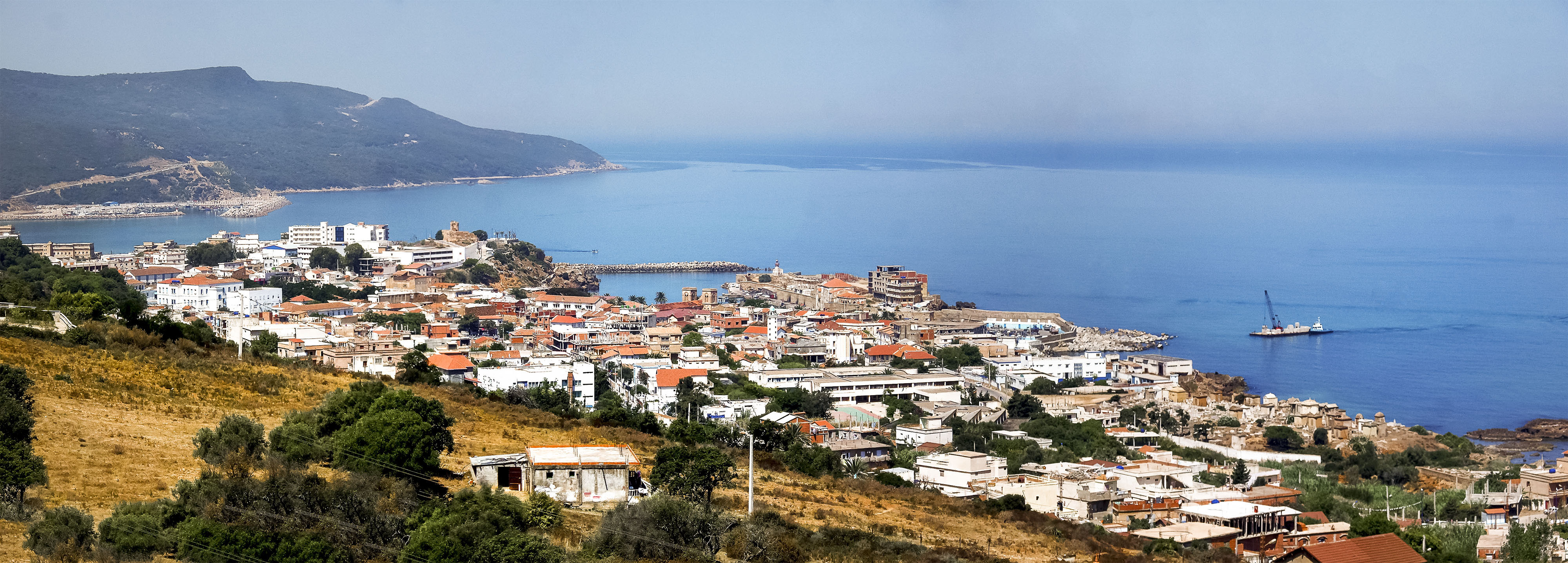
Overview of El Kala and its harbour in 2016

French and Italian coral fishing companies were interested in the area from as early as 1553. A trade bastion called "Bastion de France" by its Corsican founders was established during that period principally for the exploitation of red coral and also to facilitate trade between southern France and that part of northern Algeria. The bastion was shut down and returned to the rule of the Bey of Constantine in 1816.

It was called Marsa Al-Kharaz for centuries before being named La Calle by the French in the 16th century.

In 1677 the French moved their headquarters to La Calle. The company—Compagnie d'Afrique—which owned the concession for the fishery was suppressed in 1798 on the outbreak of war between France and Algeria. In 1806 the British consul-general at Algiers obtained the right to occupy Bona (Annaba) and La Calle for an annual rent of £11,000; but though the money was paid for several years no practical effect was given to the agreement. The French regained possession in 1817, were expelled during the wars of 1827, when La Calle was burnt, but returned and a new town was built up along the coast in 1836. The boats engaged in the fishery were mainly Italian, but the imposition, during the last quarter of the 19th century, of heavy taxes on all except French boats drove the foreign vessels away. For some years the industry was abandoned, but was restarted on a small scale in 1903.

== Titular see of Thinisa in Numidia ==
In 1933, the Ancient diocese of Thinisa in Numidia was nominally restored as a Catholic titular see of the lowest (episcopal) rank.

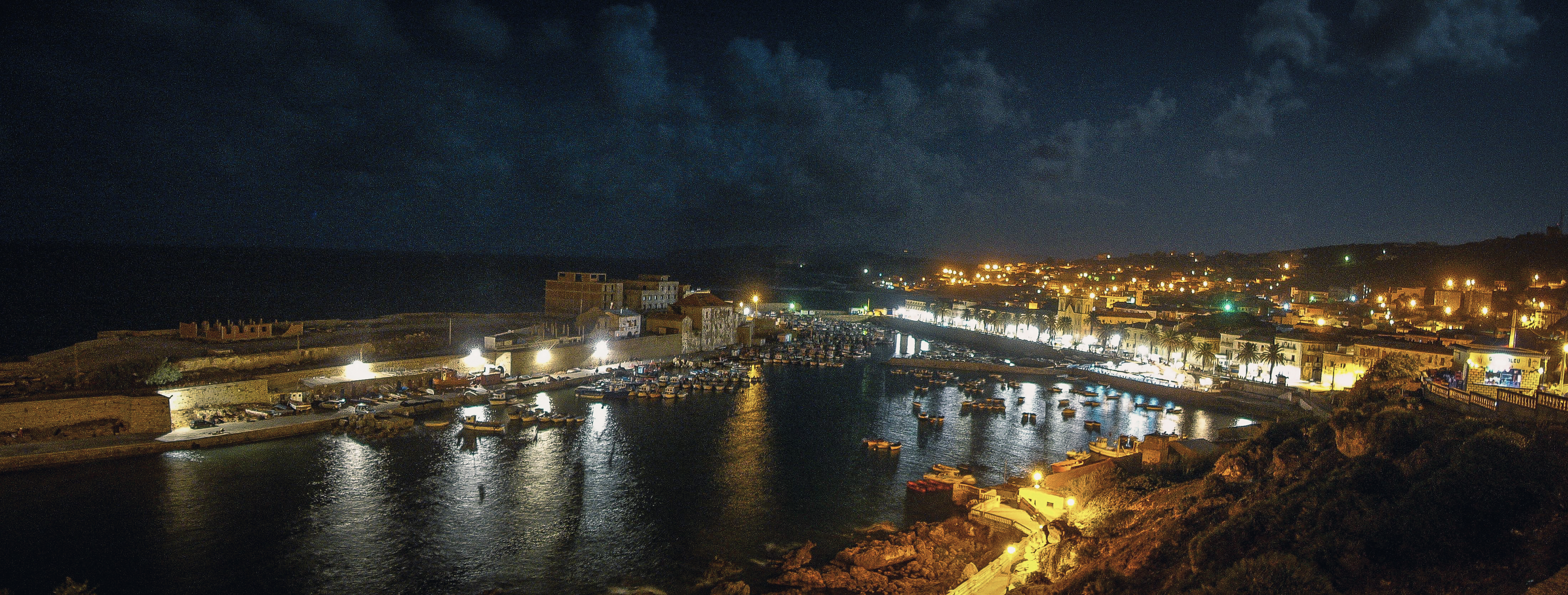
The old fishing harbor of El Kala by night. A trade-oriented harbor is under construction in the western side of town.

It has had the following incumbents:

- Francesco Venanzio Filippini, O.F.M. (1933.05.23 – 1973.03.31)
- Mario Revollo Bravo (1973.11.13 – 1978.02.28) (later Cardinal)
- Javier Lozano Barragán (1979.06.05 – 1984.10.28) (later Cardinal)
- Mario Picchi, S.D.B. (1989.06.19 – 1997.03.29)
- Vincenzo Pelvi (1999.12.11 – 2006.10.14) (later Archbishop of Foggia–Bovino)
- Laurent Chu Văn Minh, auxiliary bishop of Hanoi (Vietnam) (2008.10.15 – 2025.08.04)

== See also ==
- European enclaves in North Africa before 1830
- Lake Mellah
