= Bechloul District =

Coordinates: 36°19′N 4°04′E

- District
- Interactive map of Bechloul District
- Country: Algeria
- Province: Bouïra Province
- Time zone: UTC+1 (CET)

Bechloul District is a district of Bouïra Province, Algeria.

== Municipalities ==
The district is further divided into 5 municipalities:

- Bechloul
- El Asnam
- El Adjiba
- Ahl El Ksar
- Ouled Rached
