= Sour El Ghozlane District =

Coordinates: 36°08′50″N 3°41′26″E

Sour El Ghozlane District aumal auzia
- District
- Interactive map of Sour El Ghozlane District
- Country: Algeria
- Province: Bouïra Province
- Time zone: UTC+1 (CET)

Sour El Ghozlane District is a district of Bouïra Province, Algeria.

== Municipalities ==
The district is further divided into 6 municipalities:

- Sour El-Ghozlane
- Maamora
- Ridane
- El Hakimia
- Dechmia
- Dirrah
