= Lakhdaria District =

Coordinates: 36°33′44″N 3°35′40″E

- District
- Interactive map of Lakhdaria District
- Country: Algeria
- Province: Bouïra Province
- Time zone: UTC+1 (CET)

Lakhdaria District is a district of Bouïra Province, Algeria.

== Municipalities ==
The district is further divided into 6 municipalities:

- Lakhdaria
- Boukram
- Maala
- Bouderbala
- Zbarbar
- Guerrouma

== Notable people ==
- Mohamed Aïchaoui, journalist, militant and martyr
