= Bordj Okhriss District =

Coordinates: 36°04′47″N 3°58′28″E

- District
- Interactive map of Bordj Okhriss District
- Country: Algeria
- Province: Bouïra Province
- Time zone: UTC+1 (CET)

Bordj Okhriss District is a district of Bouïra Province, Algeria.

== Municipalities ==
The district is further divided into 4 municipalities:

- Bordj Okhriss
- Mezdour
- Taguedit
- Hadjera Zerga
