= Bir Ghbalou District =

Coordinates: 36°15′51″N 3°35′01″E

- District
- Interactive map of Bir Ghbalou District
- Country: Algeria
- Province: Bouïra Province
- Time zone: UTC+1 (CET)

Bir Ghbalou is a district of Bouïra Province, Algeria.

== Municipalities ==
The district is further divided into 3 municipalities:

- Bir Ghbalou
- Raouraoua
- El Khabouzia
