= Kadiria District =

Coordinates: 36°32′N 3°41′E

- District
- Interactive map of Kadiria District
- Country: Algeria
- Province: Bouïra Province
- Time zone: UTC+1 (CET)

Kadiria District is a district of Bouïra Province, Algeria.

== Municipalities ==
The district is further divided into 3 municipalities:

- Kadiria
- Aomar
- Djebahia
