= Aïn Bessem District =

Coordinates: 36°18′N 3°40′E

- District
- Interactive map of Aïn Bessem District
- Country: Algeria
- Province: Bouïra Province
- Time zone: UTC+1 (CET)

Aïn Bessem District is a district of Bouïra Province, Algeria.

== Municipalities ==
The district is further divided into 3 municipalities:

- Aïn Bessem
- Aïn El Hadjar
- Aïn Laloui
