= Tiqqar =

- Thiqqar
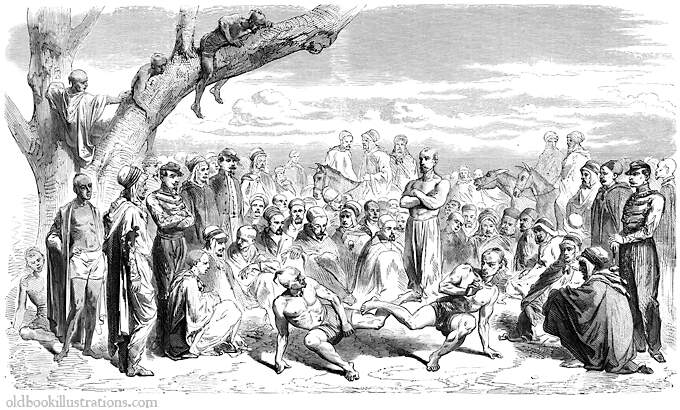
- Young men from the tribe of Ait Mellikech practicing Tiqqar
- Also known as: Kidokan
- Country of origin: Algeria
- Meaning: Mule Kick, Kick

Tiqqar (Kabyle: Thiqqar, French: Les ruades) is a traditional Algerian martial art that originates from the region of Kabylia.

== Etymology ==
The origin of the word "Tiqqar" means "Mule Kick" (Ruades) or simply "Kick".

== History ==
Thiqqar is said to have been first practiced during the period of Ancient history during the Roman invasion of Africa and was transmitted over nearly 12 centuries. However its earliest mention is in an 1857 French painting titled "Beni Mellikeche Celebrating Tikar" by a certain Captain Japy that describes it as "Ritual fight involving two men squatting and kicking each other in front of a group of spectators." The practice continued being transmitted until the 1960s where it started to disappear.

=== Kidokan ===
In the 1990s, Tiqqar was revived under the name "Kidokan" systematized by Dr. Mohamed Hamed, an international expert and master. The modern discipline is now structured in 45 countries under the aegis of the International Kidokan Federation (IKF) which is presided by Mourad Rebihi. By 2008, the sport was actively organizing events in Kabylia. On March 19, 2008, the Kidokan section of Aomar held a sports event at the local cultural center, featuring exhibitions and combats with themes including kata, self-defense, tiquar jutsu, and kidoki. Sections from Lakhdaria and Haizer participated in the tournament, with over 60 athletes taking part. Sofiane Saâdaoui, a 27-year-old 4th dan black belt, was also present. Saâdaoui had begun his martial arts journey in 1986 with Shotokan karate before transitioning to Kidokan, obtaining his 1st kiy in 1997, a diploma and 2nd dan in Tunisia, and finally his Kidokan license in 2006. Kidokan seems particularly popular among citizens of Bouira Province.

== Rules and Techniques ==
Thiqqar is a team based game usually played by children and adolescents with variations between casual play and more formal competitions. According to the Kabyle scholar Boulifa, the game took place in summer and spring, with participants divided into two teams, players struck each other with direct kicks or trips, defending their teammates until one side grew tired and conceded by declaring "That's enough!". A 2016 first hand autobiographical account by Mohamed Haddad confirms that and expands on this description. Teams were organized homogeneously based on the size and morphology of players to ensure fairness. The two teams would face each other, and each participant struck their direct opponent using only their feet either with direct kicks or trips. Players also defended teammates in difficulty. The game continued until exhaustion, with the defeated side conceding by declaring "forfait" (forfeit). The same source recalls it as a "violent and painful" game. Sources differ on the seasonal context. While Boulifa places Tiqqar in spring and summer, other ethnographic accounts describe it as a winter activity for adolescent boys in enclosed spaces, where matches could last for hours and carried significant social stakes establishing or breaking a young man's reputation as a remarkable fighter or a poor player. These seasonal discrepancies may hint at regional variations across Kabylia or differences between children's casual play and more formal adolescent competitions held during village assemblies (tajmaât).
