= El Hachimia District =

Coordinates: 36°14′N 3°50′E

- District
- Interactive map of El Hachimia District
- Country: Algeria
- Province: Bouïra Province
- Time zone: UTC+1 (CET)

El Hachimia District is a district of Bouïra Province, Algeria.

== Municipalities ==
The district is further divided into 2 municipalities:

- El Hachimia
- Oued El Berdi
