= Koudiat Acerdoune Dam =

Dam in Algeria

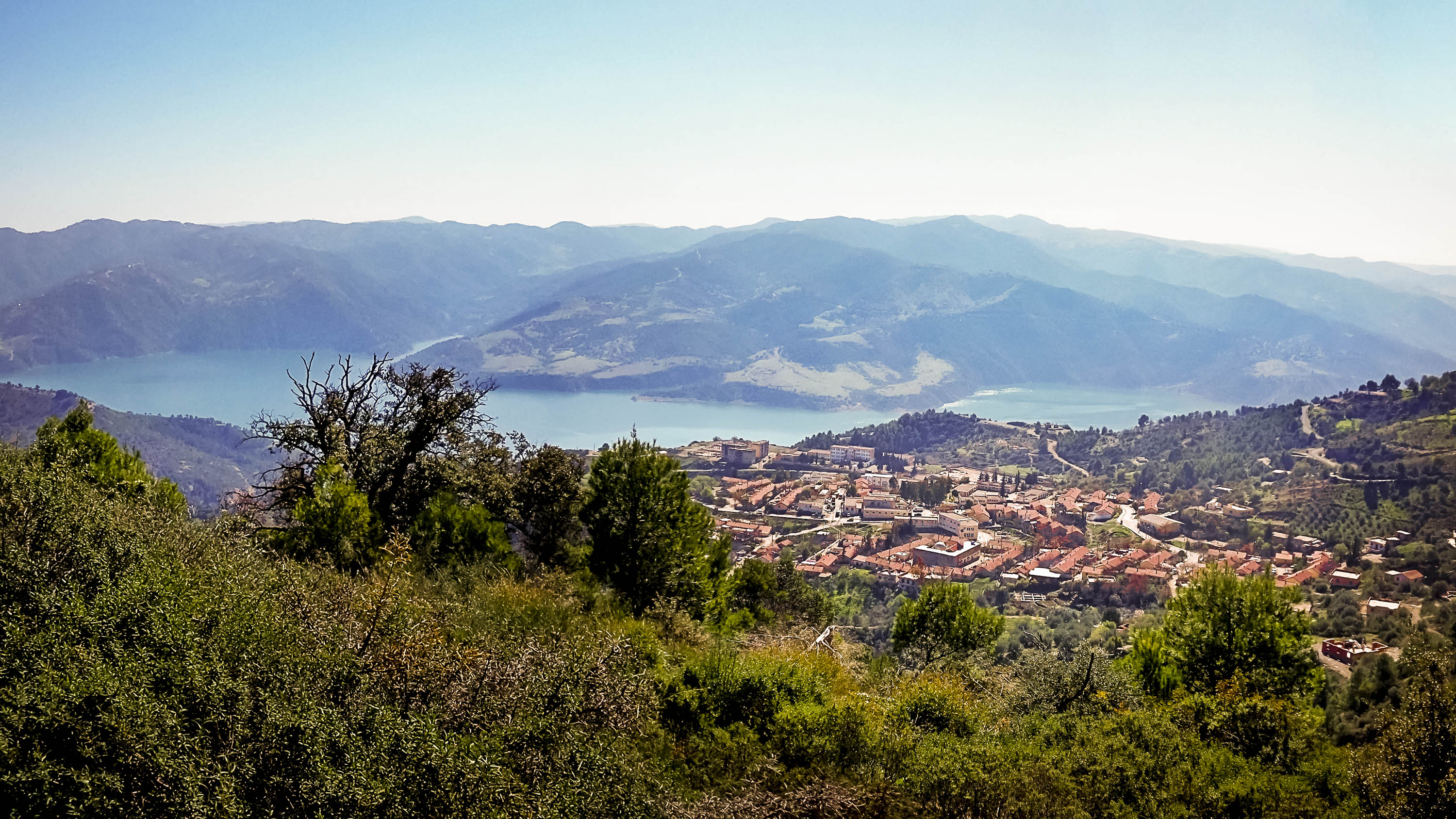

- Location within Algeria
- Official name: Barrage Koudiat Acerdoune
- Country: Algeria
- Coordinates: 36°29′18″N 03°35′31″E
- Status: Operational
- Construction began: 2002
- Opening date: 2008

Dam and spillways
- Type of dam: Gravity
- Impounds: Isser River
- Height: 121 m (397 ft)
- Length: 493 m (1,617 ft)
- Dam volume: 1,600,000 m^{3} (2,092,721 cu yd)

Reservoir
- Total capacity: 640,000,000 m^{3} (518,856 acre⋅ft)

The Koudiat Acerdoune Dam is a gravity dam located 9.5 km (6 mi) southwest of Kadiria on the Isser River in Bouïra Province, Algeria. The dam was constructed between 2002 and 2008 with the roller-compacted concrete technique. It serves the purpose of providing water for industrial, irrigation and municipal uses. It retains a 640,000,000 m^{3} (518,856 acre⋅ft) capacity reservoir which supplies water for the irrigation of 20,000 ha (49,421 acres) of land along with providing the Algiers region with 178,000,000 m^{3} (144,307 acre⋅ft) of drinking water annually.
