= Bouïra =

Bouïra Tubiret / البويرة Garanda
- Bouira
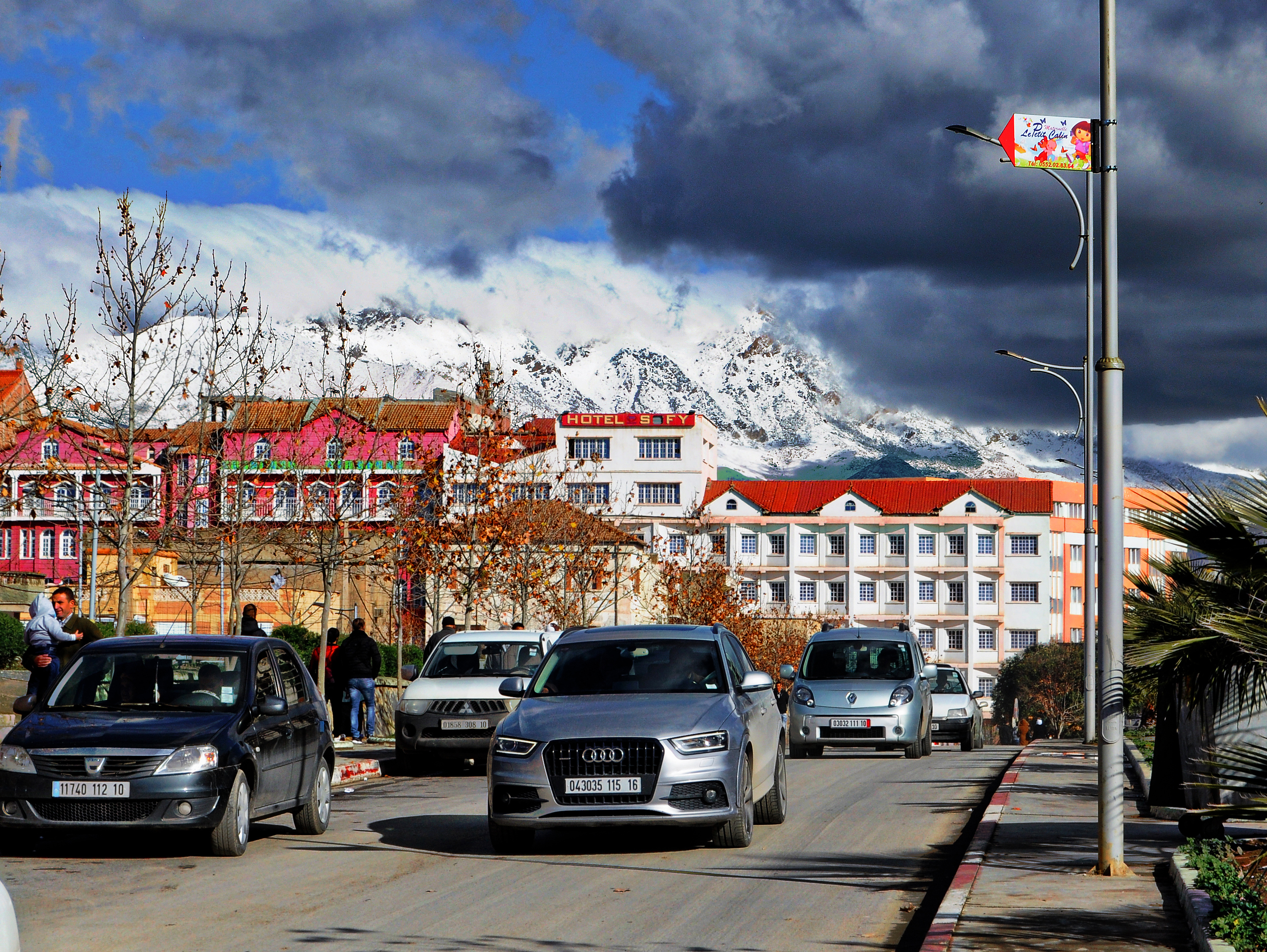
- Mountain view

- Location of the City within Bouïra province

- Location in Algeria
- Coordinates: 36.36666°N 3.88333°E
- Country: Algeria
- Province: Bouïra Province
- District: Bouïra District
- Established: 1972

Area
  - Total: 127.55 km^{2} (49.25 sq mi)
- Highest elevation: 600 m (2,000 ft)
- Lowest elevation: 580 m (1,900 ft)

Population (2008)
  - Total: 88,801
  - Density: 696.21/km^{2} (1,803.2/sq mi)
- Time zone: UTC+1 (CET)
- Postal code: 10000
- Climate: Csa

Bouïra is the capital of Bouïra Province, Algeria. The city is also called "Garanda" by the locals.

== Demographics ==
It has 75,086 inhabitants as of the 1998 census, which gives it 15 seats in the PMA.

Historical population
Year	Population
1954	18,200
1966	16,106
1987	35,600; 36,500 (municipality)
1998	52,500

== Geography ==
It is located in the geographical heart of the province. It borders the municipality of Ait Laziz in the north, Aïn Turk in the north-east (home to the largest aqueduct in Africa), Aïn El Hadjar in the east, El Hachimia in the south-east, Oued El Berdi in the south, El Asnam in the south-west, Haizer in the west, and Taghzourt in the north-west.

=== Climate ===
Climate data for Bouïra
Month	Jan	Feb	Mar	Apr	May	Jun	Jul	Aug	Sep	Oct	Nov	Dec	Year
Mean daily maximum °C (°F)	12.0 (53.6)	12.6 (54.7)	16.3 (61.3)	19.7 (67.5)	23.8 (74.8)	29.6 (85.3)	34.1 (93.4)	33.9 (93.0)	28.5 (83.3)	24.0 (75.2)	16.3 (61.3)	12.7 (54.9)	22.0 (71.5)
Daily mean °C (°F)	6.6 (43.9)	6.9 (44.4)	10.2 (50.4)	13.4 (56.1)	17.3 (63.1)	22.5 (72.5)	26.5 (79.7)	26.2 (79.2)	21.7 (71.1)	17.6 (63.7)	11.0 (51.8)	7.6 (45.7)	15.6 (60.1)
Mean daily minimum °C (°F)	2.0 (35.6)	2.0 (35.6)	4.6 (40.3)	7.2 (45.0)	10.7 (51.3)	15.1 (59.2)	18.7 (65.7)	19.0 (66.2)	15.8 (60.4)	12.1 (53.8)	6.6 (43.9)	3.4 (38.1)	9.8 (49.6)
Average precipitation mm (inches)	88 (3.5)	78 (3.1)	84 (3.3)	86 (3.4)	74 (2.9)	21 (0.8)	8 (0.3)	19 (0.7)	53 (2.1)	60 (2.4)	81 (3.2)	82 (3.2)	734 (28.9)
Source: Climate data.org(1991-2021)

== Transportation ==
The Autoroute A2 passes through the city.

== See also ==
- Suk Hamza
