= M'Chedellah District =

Coordinates: 36°22′N 4°16′E

- District
- Interactive map of M'Chedellah District
- Country: Algeria
- Province: Bouïra Province
- Time zone: UTC+1 (CET)

M'Chedellah District is a district of Bouïra Province, Algeria.

== Municipalities ==
The district is further divided into 6 municipalities:

- M'Chedallah
- Chorfa
- Ath Mansour Taourirt
- Saharidj
- Ahnif
- Aghbalou
