= Billel Messaoudi =

Algerian footballer (born 1997)

Billel Messaoudi ⴱⵉⵍⴻⵍ ⵎⴻⵙⴰⵓⴷⵉ
Personal information
- Date of birth: 21 December 1997 (age 28)
- Place of birth: Kadiria, Algeria
- Height: 1.84 m (6 ft 0 in)
- Position: Forward

Team information
- Current team: JS Kabylie
- Number: 9

Youth career
- –2016: DRB Kadiria
- 2016–2017: USM Alger

Senior career*
Years	Team	Apps	(Gls)
2017–2022	JS Saoura	45	(21)
2018–2019	→ WA Tlemcen (loan)	25	(7)
2021–2022	→ Kortrijk (loan)	17	(1)
2022–2025	Kortrijk	48	(2)
2023–2024	→ Göztepe (loan)	23	(5)
2025	→ Bandırmaspor (loan)	17	(6)
2025–2026	Bandırmaspor	4	(1)
2025–2026	→ JS Kabylie (loan)	21	(4)
2026–	JS Kabylie	9	(3)

International career^{‡}
2018	Algeria U18	3	(0)
2019	Algeria U23	1	(0)
2021	Algeria A'	2	(1)
- * Club domestic league appearances and goals as of 21:11, 19 November 2026 (UTC) ‡ National team caps and goals as of 17 June 2021

Billel Messaoudi (Arabic: بلال مسعودي; Tamazight: ⴱⵉⵍⴻⵍ ⵎⴻⵙⴰⵓⴷⵉ; born 21 December 1997) is an Algerian professional footballer who plays as a forward for JS Kabylie.

== Club career ==
Billel Messaoudi was born in Kadiria, Bouira, Kabylia.

On 31 May 2022, Messaoudi moved to Kortrijk on a four-year contract, after playing there on loan in the previous season.

On 14 August 2023, he joined TFF First League club Göztepe on a season-long loan deal with the option to purchase.

On 20 January 2025, he returned to Turkey and joined Bandırmaspor on loan with an option to buy.

On 30 August 2025, he joined JS Kabylie until the end of the 2027–28 season, on loan from Bandırmaspor, with a conditional purchase option.

== Honours ==
Individual

- Algerian Ligue Professionnelle 1 Player of the Month: October 2026
