= Battle of Ferkouia (2015) =

- Part of Jihadist Insurgency in Algeria
Date	19–20 May 2015
Location	Bouira, Algeria
Result	Algerian victory

Belligerents
Algeria	(Islamic State) AQIM

Commanders and leaders
(Algeria) Noureddine Haddad	(Islamic State) Athman Al Assimi †

Strength
Unknown	50–100

Casualties and losses
Unknown	25

The Battle of Ferkouia took place on May 19 and 20, 2015, during an offensive by the Algerian army against jihadists.

== Background ==
On May 9, 2015, the Algerian army initiated an operation against jihadists in the Bouira region. General Noureddine Haddad, the chief of staff of the first Military Region, led the operation.

== Battle ==
On May 19, a battle erupted in the locality of Ferkouia, near Boukram, to the west of Bouira. According to the Algerian Ministry of Defense, 22 jihadists were killed. The army did not specify their affiliation, but Reuters reported, based on security sources, that they were members of the Soldiers of the Caliphate group in Algeria who had pledged allegiance to the Islamic State. Athman al Assimi, the successor to Abdelmalek Gouri as the group's leader, was mentioned among the casualties. However, several dozen fighters managed to escape. The next morning, three additional jihadists are killed in the same area, bringing the total to 25 casualties.
