= Bouïra District =

Coordinates: 36°22′48″N 3°54′05″E

- District
- Interactive map of Bouïra District
- Country: Algeria
- Province: Bouïra Province
- Time zone: UTC+1 (CET)

Bouïra District is a district of Bouïra Province, Algeria.

== Municipalities ==
The district is further divided into 3 municipalities:

- Bouïra
- Aïn Turk
- Aït Laziz
