= Souk El Khemis District =

Coordinates: 36°23′36″N 3°37′41″E

- District
- Interactive map of Souk El Khemis District
- Country: Algeria
- Province: Bouïra Province
- Time zone: UTC+1 (CET)

Souk El Khemis District is a district of Bouïra Province, Algeria.

== Municipalities ==
The district is further divided into 2 municipalities:

- Souk El Khemis
- El Mokrani
