= Bouiche =

- Village
- Interactive map of Bouiche
- Coordinates: 36°19′18″N 4°06′44″E
- Country: Algeria
- Province: Bouïra Province
- Commune: Bechloul
- Time zone: UTC+1 (CET)

Bouiche is a village in Bouïra Province, Algeria.
