= Haïzer District =

Coordinates: 36°24′55″N 3°58′30″E

- District
- Interactive map of Haïzer District
- Country: Algeria
- Province: Bouïra Province
- Time zone: UTC+1 (CET)

Haïzer District is a district of Bouïra Province, Algeria.

== Municipalities ==
The district is further divided into 2 municipalities:

- Haizer
- Taghzout
