= Taghzout =

Taghzout may refer to:

- Taghzout, Bouïra, Algeria
- Taghzout, El Oued, Algeria
- Taghzout, Morocco
