= Omar Sahnoun =

French footballer (1955–1980)

Personal information
- Date of birth: 18 August 1955
- Place of birth: Guerrouma, Algeria
- Date of death: 21 April 1980 (aged 24)
- Place of death: Bordeaux, France
- Height: 1.75 m (5 ft 9 in)
- Position: Midfielder

Youth career
- 1967–1972: Beauvais

Senior career*
Years	Team	Apps	(Gls)
1972–1979	Nantes	105	(21)
1979–1980	Bordeaux	32	(5)
Total		137	(26)

International career
1977–1978	France	6	(0)
- * Club domestic league appearances and goals

Omar Sahnoun (Arabic: عمر سحنون; 18 August 1955 – 21 April 1980) was a French professional footballer who played as a midfielder.

== Football career ==
Sahnoun was born in Guerrouma, Algeria the son of a harki, and his family settled in Beauvais, France in 1962. Ten years later, at only 17, he made his professional debuts with FC Nantes, under Jean Vincent. A talented offensive player, he appeared however intermittently for the club due to heart problems, only posting two productive seasons in seven years, especially 1976–77 where he scored 15 times in 32 matches, as the Pays de la Loire team won the fourth Ligue 1 title in their history.

Sahnoun gained six caps for France, his debut coming on 23 February 1977 in a friendly with West Germany, in Paris. At the end of the year, he suffered a cardiac alert which cause him to put his career on hold for a few months; subsequently, he would not make the list for the 1978 FIFA World Cup in Argentina.

After having returned to active, Sahnoun played one year for FC Girondins de Bordeaux, being regularly used in a team that finished in sixth position. On 21 April 1980, four months shy of his 25th birthday, during club training, he died from a heart attack.

== Personal life ==
Sahnoun's son, Nicolas, was also a footballer and a midfielder. He too played for Bordeaux.

== Honours ==
- Ligue 1: 1972–73, 1976–77
- Coupe de France: 1978–79
