= Ma'dhar =

- Etymology: from personal name,
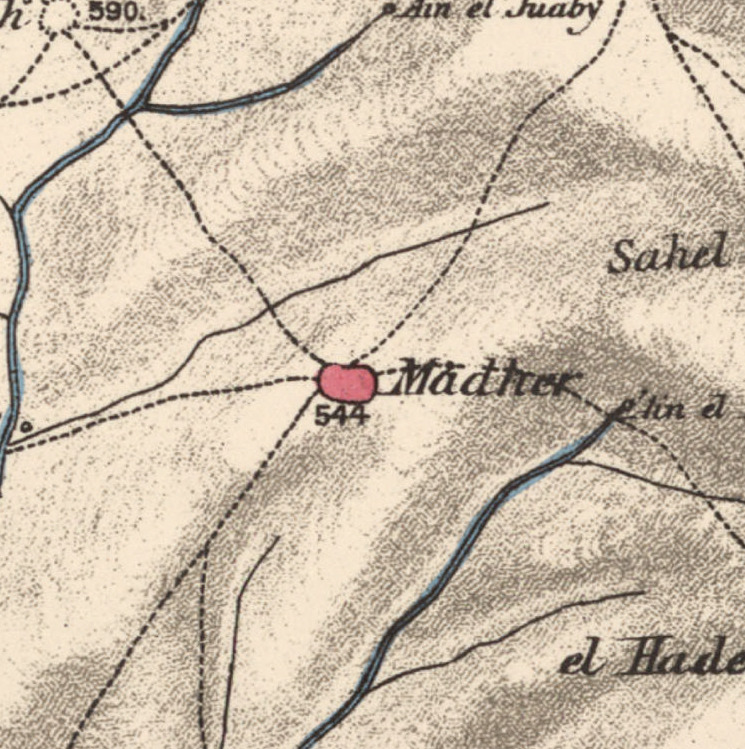
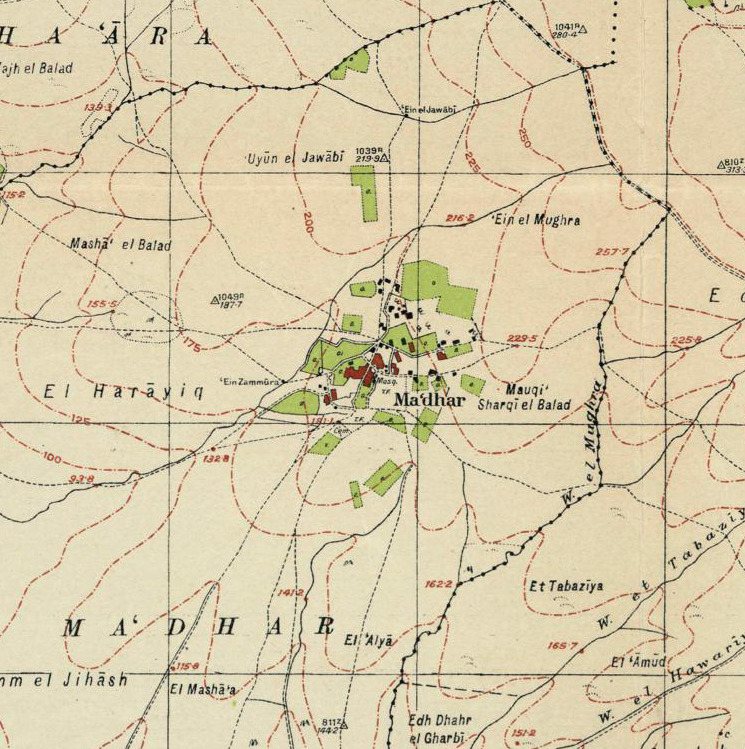
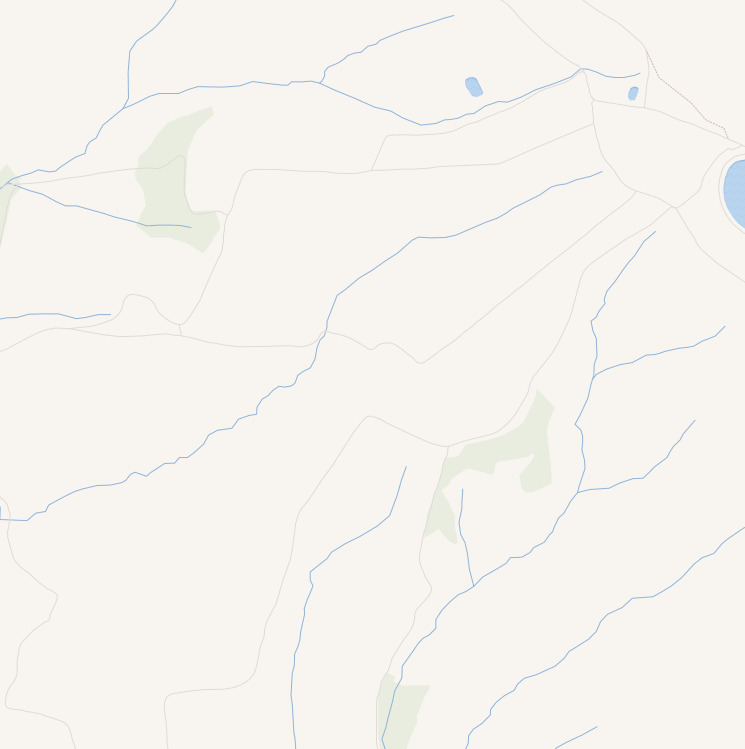
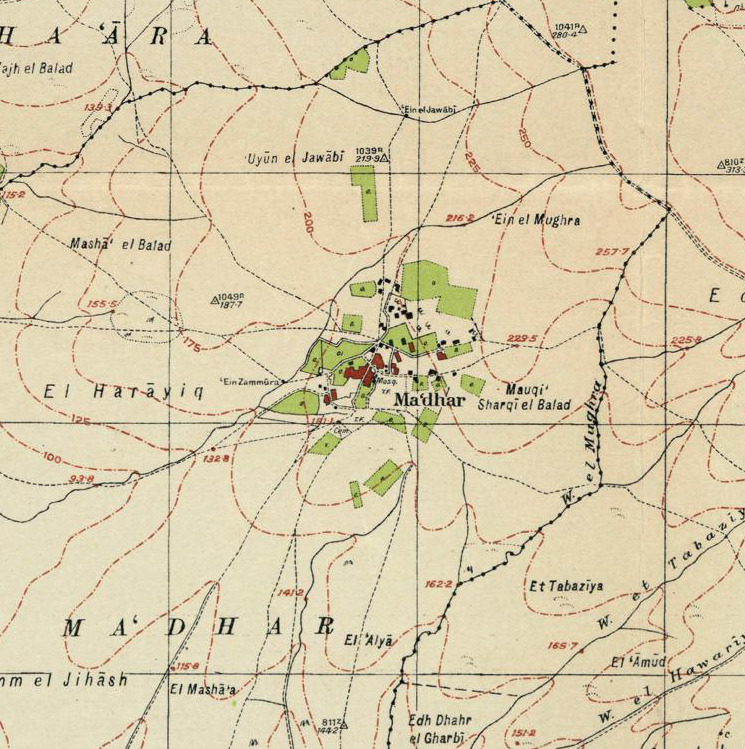
- 1870s map 1940s map modern map 1940s with modern overlay map A series of historical maps of the area around Ma'dhar (click the buttons)

- Location within Mandatory Palestine
- Coordinates: 32°41′35″N 35°27′51″E
- Palestine grid: 193/233
- Geopolitical entity: Mandatory Palestine
- Subdistrict: Tiberias
- Date of depopulation: April 6, 1948

Area
  - Total: 11,666 dunams (11.666 km^{2}; 4.504 sq mi)

Population (1945)
  - Total: 480
- Cause(s) of depopulation: Abandonment on Arab orders
- Current Localities: Kefar Qish

Ma'dhar was a Palestinian village in the Tiberias Subdistrict.

In the late 19th century, Ma'dhar was settled by Algerian migrants from Oued El Berdi and Bouïra under the Ottoman Empire.

The village was depopulated during the 1947–1948 Civil War in Mandatory Palestine on May 12, 1948, by the Golani Brigade of Operation Gideon. It was located 12.5 km southwest of Tiberias.

== History ==
Ceramics from the Byzantine era have been found here.

The Crusaders referred to Ma'dhar as Kapharmater.

=== Ottoman era ===
Ma'dhar was incorporated into the Ottoman Empire in 1517, and by 1596, it was a village under the administration of the nahiya ("subdistrict") of Tiberias, part of Safad Sanjak. The village had a population of 17 households, an estimated 94 inhabitants, all Muslim. The villagers paid a fixed tax rate of 25% on wheat, barley, goats, beehives and orchards; a total of 2,000 Akçe. A map from Napoleon's invasion of 1799 by Pierre Jacotin showed the place, named as Chara, but misplaced.

In the late 19th century, Ma'dhar was one of several villages settled by Algerian migrants under the auspices of the Ottoman Empire. The settlers belonged to the tribe of Awlad Sidi Khaled and Sidi Amr, who migrated from Oued El Berdi and Bouïra, in Algeria.

In 1881, the PEF's Survey of Western Palestine (SWP) described the village as having about 250 Muslim residents, in a village made of basalt and other stone. Water was supplied from cisterns and springs.

A population list from about 1887 showed Madher to have about 975 inhabitants; all Muslims.

=== British Mandate era ===
At the time of the 1922 census of Palestine, Madhar had a population of 347 Muslims, increasing slightly to 359 Muslims living in 91 houses by the 1931 census.

By the 1945 statistics, the village population was 480 Muslims, and the total land area was 11,666 dunums of land. 498 dunams were irrigated or used for orchards, 10,766 used for cereals, while 63 dunams were built-up (urban) land.

Ma'dhar had a school founded by the Ottomans, but closed during the British Mandate period. Ma'dhar contained a mosque and still has the ruins of a church, a burial ground, and ruined Crusader fortress called Casel de Cherio.

=== Post 1948 ===
In 1992, the village site was described: "The site has been fenced in and is used as an Israeli grazing area. A large cluster of cactus grows in the midst of the stone rubble of houses, and there is a well, capped with a pump, in the center of the site. About 20 m to the west of the well is a drinking trough for animals. Eucalyptus, doum palm, and chinaberry trees grow on the site."

== Bibliography ==
- Barron, J. B., ed. (1923). Palestine: Report and General Abstracts of the Census of 1922. Government of Palestine.
- Conder, C.R.; Kitchener, H. H. (1881). The Survey of Western Palestine: Memoirs of the Topography, Orography, Hydrography, and Archaeology. Vol. 1. London: Committee of the Palestine Exploration Fund.
- Dauphin, C. (1998). La Palestine byzantine, Peuplement et Populations. BAR International Series 726 (in French). Vol. III : Catalogue. Oxford: Archeopress. ISBN 0-860549-05-4.
- Department of Statistics (1945). Village Statistics, April, 1945. Government of Palestine.
- Hadawi, S. (1970). Village Statistics of 1945: A Classification of Land and Area ownership in Palestine. Palestine Liberation Organization Research Center.
- Hütteroth, W.-D.; Abdulfattah, K. (1977). Historical Geography of Palestine, Transjordan and Southern Syria in the Late 16th Century. Erlanger Geographische Arbeiten, Sonderband 5. Erlangen, Germany: Vorstand der Fränkischen Geographischen Gesellschaft. ISBN 3-920405-41-2.
- Karmon, Y. (1960). "An Analysis of Jacotin's Map of Palestine" (PDF). Israel Exploration Journal. 10 (3, 4): 155–173, 244–253. Archived from the original (PDF) on 2019-12-22.
- Khalidi, W. (1992). All That Remains: The Palestinian Villages Occupied and Depopulated by Israel in 1948. Washington D.C.: Institute for Palestine Studies. ISBN 0-88728-224-5.
- Mills, E., ed. (1932). Census of Palestine 1931. Population of Villages, Towns and Administrative Areas. Jerusalem: Government of Palestine.
- Morris, B. (2004). The Birth of the Palestinian Refugee Problem Revisited. Cambridge University Press. ISBN 978-0-521-00967-6.
- Palmer, E. H. (1881). The Survey of Western Palestine: Arabic and English Name Lists Collected During the Survey by Lieutenants Conder and Kitchener, R. E. Transliterated and Explained by E.H. Palmer. Committee of the Palestine Exploration Fund.
- Rhode, H. (1979). Administration and Population of the Sancak of Safed in the Sixteenth Century. Columbia University. Archived from the original on 2020-03-01.
- Schumacher, G. (1888). "Population list of the Liwa of Akka". Quarterly Statement - Palestine Exploration Fund. 20: 169–191.
- Thomson, W.M. (1882). The Land and the Book: Or, Biblical Illustrations Drawn from the Manners and Customs, the Scenes and Scenery, of the Holy Land: Central Palestine and Phænicia. Vol. 2. New York: Harper & brothers. (Thomson, 1882, p. 329)
