= Aïn Turk =

Aïn Turk may refer to:

- Aïn Turk, Bouïra, a municipality or commune of the Bouïra province, Algeria
- Aïn El Turk, Oran, a municipality or commune of the Oran province, Algeria
