= Madhar =

Madhar could refer to:

- Battle of Madhar, 686 AD battle near modern-day Basra, Iraq
- Ma'dhar, a place in the subdistrict of Tiberias, Palestine
- Mohamed Madhar (born 1962), Surinamese judoka
