= Aïn El Hadjar =

Aïn El Hadjar may refer to the following places in Algeria:

- Aïn El Hadjar, Bouïra
- Aïn El Hadjar, Saïda
