= Marble Valley Bridge =

The Marble Valley Bridge (Arabic: جسر وادي الرخام) is a bridge located between the cities of Lakhdaria and Bouïra in northern Algeria. It is the highest bridge in Africa. The bridge falls under the draft National Road east–west highway that travels from west to east of Algiers.

== Informations relating to the bridge ==
- Height: 140 metres (460 ft) (Highest in Africa).
- Length: 744 metres (2,441 ft)
- Depth of bridge columns under the Earth's surface: 60 metres (200 ft)
- The cost of achievement: 1.500.000.000 dza.
- Bridge resistant to earthquakes.
- Side barriers in anti-shock.
