= Tatilti =

Roman Empire - Mauretania Caesariensis (125 AD).

Tatilti was an ancient town of the Byzantine and Roman Empires in the Roman province of Mauretania Caesariensis. It is identifiable with the modern town of Souk El Khemis, Algeria.

The town was the site of a Roman Army camp, as evidenced by numerous inscription in the area.

The town was also the seat of the ancient bishopric of Tatiltensis. Although the diocese ceased to effectively function with the Muslim conquest of the Maghreb, the diocese continues in name at least as a titular see of the Roman Catholic Church. Tatiltensis current bishop is Eulises Gonzáles Sánchez of Colombia.

Known bishops

- Donato (fl.484)
- Jesus Y. Varela (1967–1971)
- Giovanni Décimo Pellegrini (1972–1992)
- Adalberto Martínez Flores (1997–2000)
- Eulises González Sánchez (2000–current)
