= Ath Mansour =

Ath Mansour Taourirt آث منصور
- Commune and town

- Location within Algeria
- Coordinates: 36.330823°N 4.301147°E
- Country: Algeria
- Province: Bouïra Province
- District: M'Chedellah District

Population (2008)
  - Total: 10,077
- Time zone: UTC+1 (CET)
- CP: 10125

Ath Mansour Taourirt is a town and commune in Bouïra Province, Algeria. According to the 1998 census it has a population of 9,283.
