= Ait Mellikech =

Kabyle tribe

Ait Mellikech At Mlikec
- Kabyle tribe
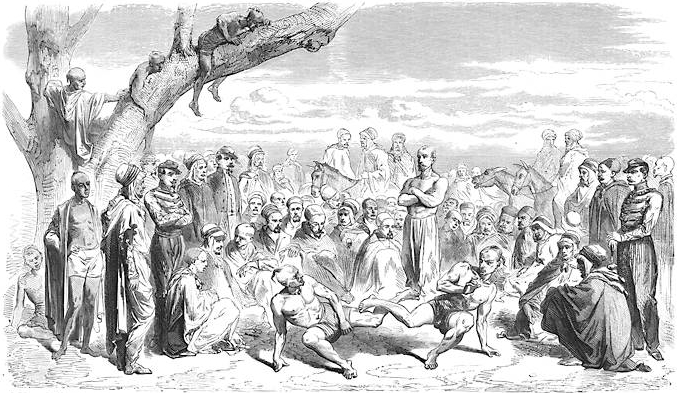
- Young men from the tribe practicing Tiqqar, 1857
- Ethnicity: Kabyles
- Location: Sahel Valley
- Language: Kabyle
- Religion: Islam

The Ait Mellikech (Kabyle: At Mlikec) are a non-confederated Kabyle tribe inhabiting the Sahel Valley in Kabylia. Their territory corresponds, more or less, to the commune of Ait Mellikeche.

== Etymology ==
The name Mellikech has many possible etymologies. According to Mustapha Tidjet, Mellikech could be:

- A hypocoristic form of the given name Malek;
- Related to alkuc, meaning "a scarf worn by women around the head";
- Derived from telekki, meaning "humid fertile land" or "land cultivated near a river", and therefore meaning "fertilized garden".

== History ==
In 1830, the tribe took part in an expedition, along with the Regency of Algiers, to defend Algiers from the French invasion.

On 10 July 1857, the Ait Mellikech submitted to the French colonial army. They were then forced to pay a taxx of 35,000 francs.
