= Suk Hamza =

Ancient city in Algeria

Suk Hamza (Arabic: سوق حمزة), or Ha'it Hamza (Arabic: حائط حمزة), is likely the present-day Bouïra in Algeria. It was founded by Hamza ben al-Hasan ben Suleiman ben al-Hussein ben Ali ben al-Hasan ben Ali ben Abi Talib. The town is mentioned in the works of several chroniclers and geographers, including Ibn Hammad, who was originally from this city.

== See also ==
- Bouïra
- Qal'at Bani Hammad
- Al-Batha, Algeria
