= El Mokrani =

Coordinates: 35°55′N 0°06′E

- Commune and town
- Interactive map of El Mokrani
- Country: Algeria
- Province: Bouïra Province

Population (1998)
  - Total: 4,856
- Time zone: UTC+1 (CET)

El Mokrani is a town and commune in Bouïra Province, Algeria. According to the 1998 census it has a population of 4,856.
