= Aïn Bessem =

Coordinates: 36°17′48″N 3°40′12″E

Ain-Bessem عين بسام
- Commune and town
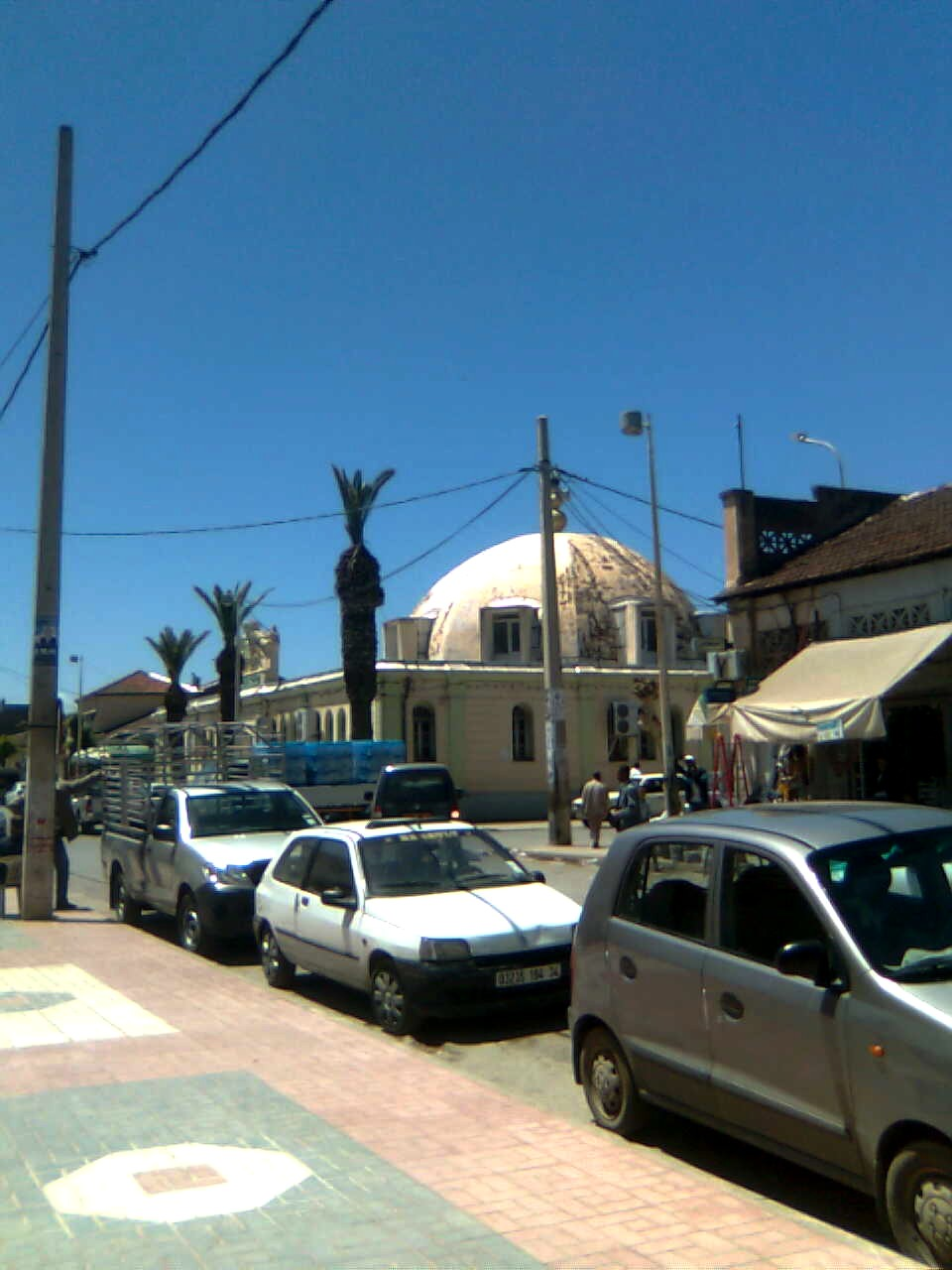

- Country: Algeria
- Province: Bouïra Province

Population (2008)
  - Total: 32,548
- Time zone: UTC+1 (CET)

Ain-Bessem is a town and commune in Bouïra Province, Algeria. According to the 2008 census it has a population of 32,548.
