= Bir Ghbalou =

Bir Ghbalou بئر غبالو
- District
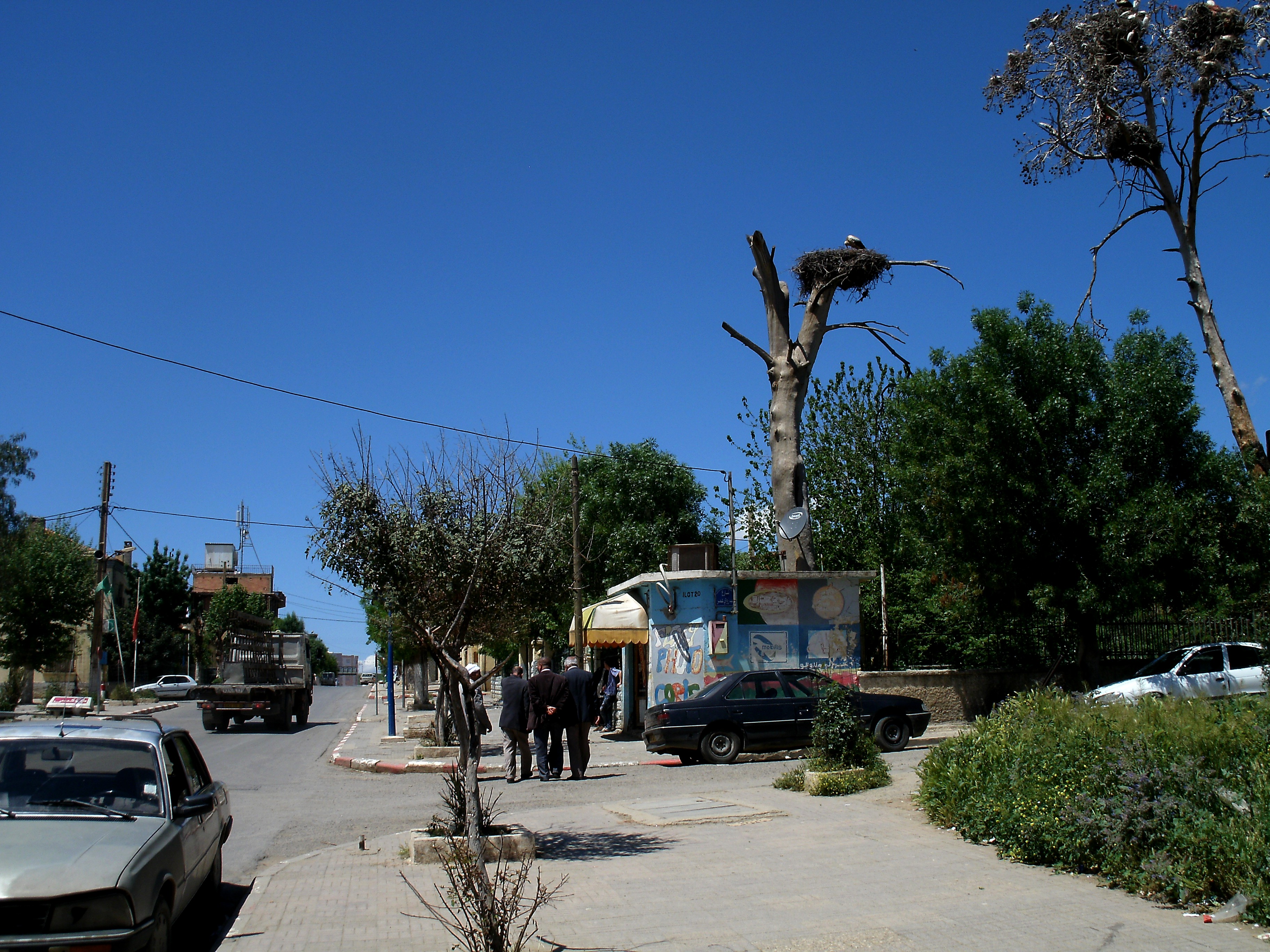

- Location within Algeria
- Coordinates: 36°15′47″N 3°35′11″E
- Country: Algeria
- Province: Bouïra Province

Area
  - Total: 34 sq mi (87 km^{2})

Population (2008)
  - Total: 11,016
- Time zone: UTC+1 (CET)

Bir Ghbalou is a commune of Bouïra Province, Algeria.
