= Dirrah =

- Commune and town
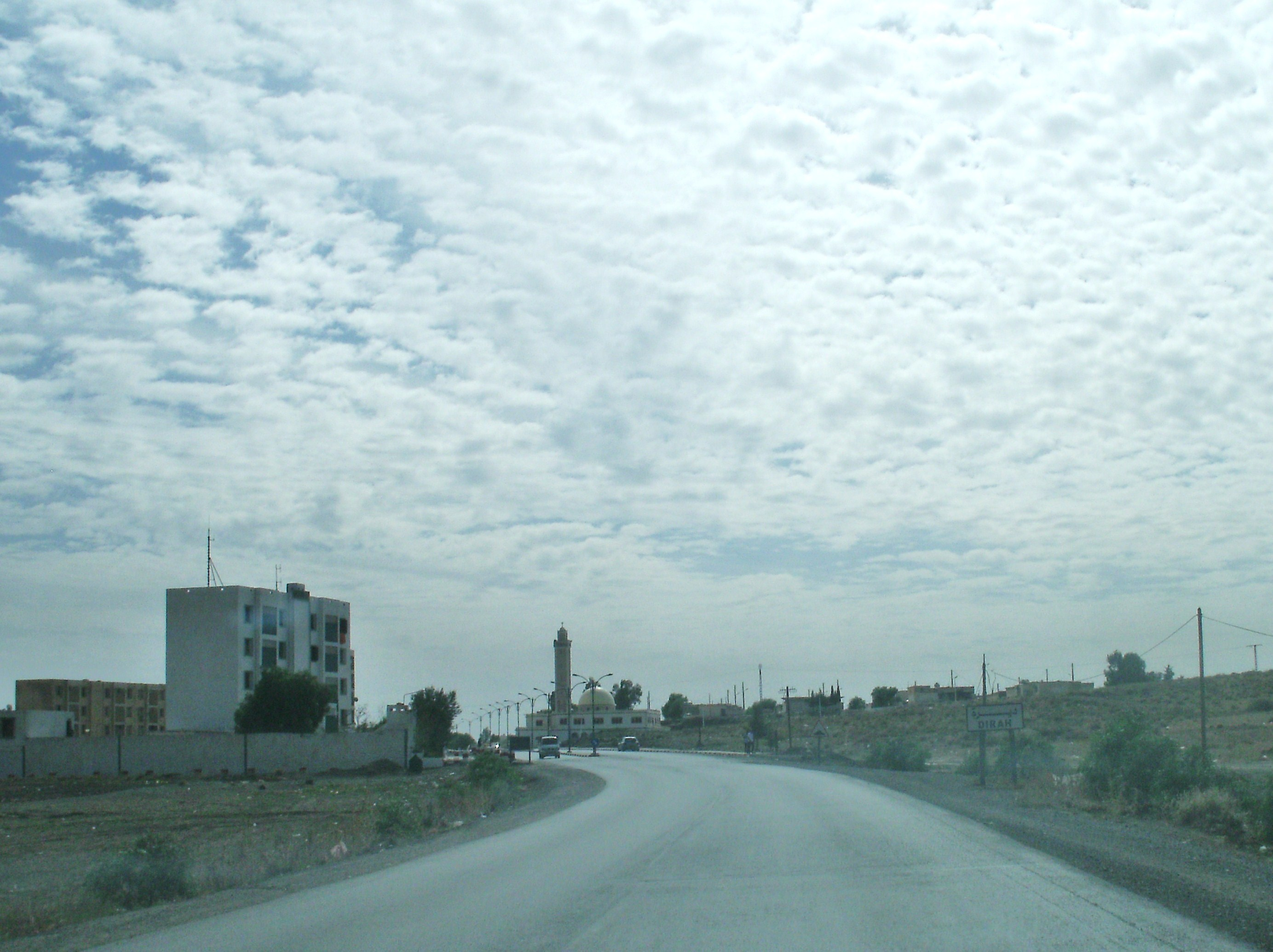

- Location within Algeria
- Coordinates: 36°0′1″N 3°45′12″E
- Country: Algeria
- Province: Bouïra Province

Population (2008)
  - Total: 13,209
- Time zone: UTC+1 (CET)

Dirrah is a town and commune in Bouïra Province, Algeria. According to the 1998 census it has a population of 12,512.
