= Taguedit =

Coordinates: 36°01′03″N 3°59′41″E

- Commune and town
- Interactive map of Taguedit
- Country: Algeria
- Province: Bouïra Province

Population (1998)
  - Total: 10,277
- Time zone: UTC+1 (CET)

Taguedit is a town and commune in Bouïra Province, Algeria. According to the 1998 census it has a population of 10,277.
