= Zbarbar =

Coordinates: 36°29′05″N 3°31′33″E

Zbarbar ⵥⴱⴰⵔⴱⴰⵔ
- Commune and town
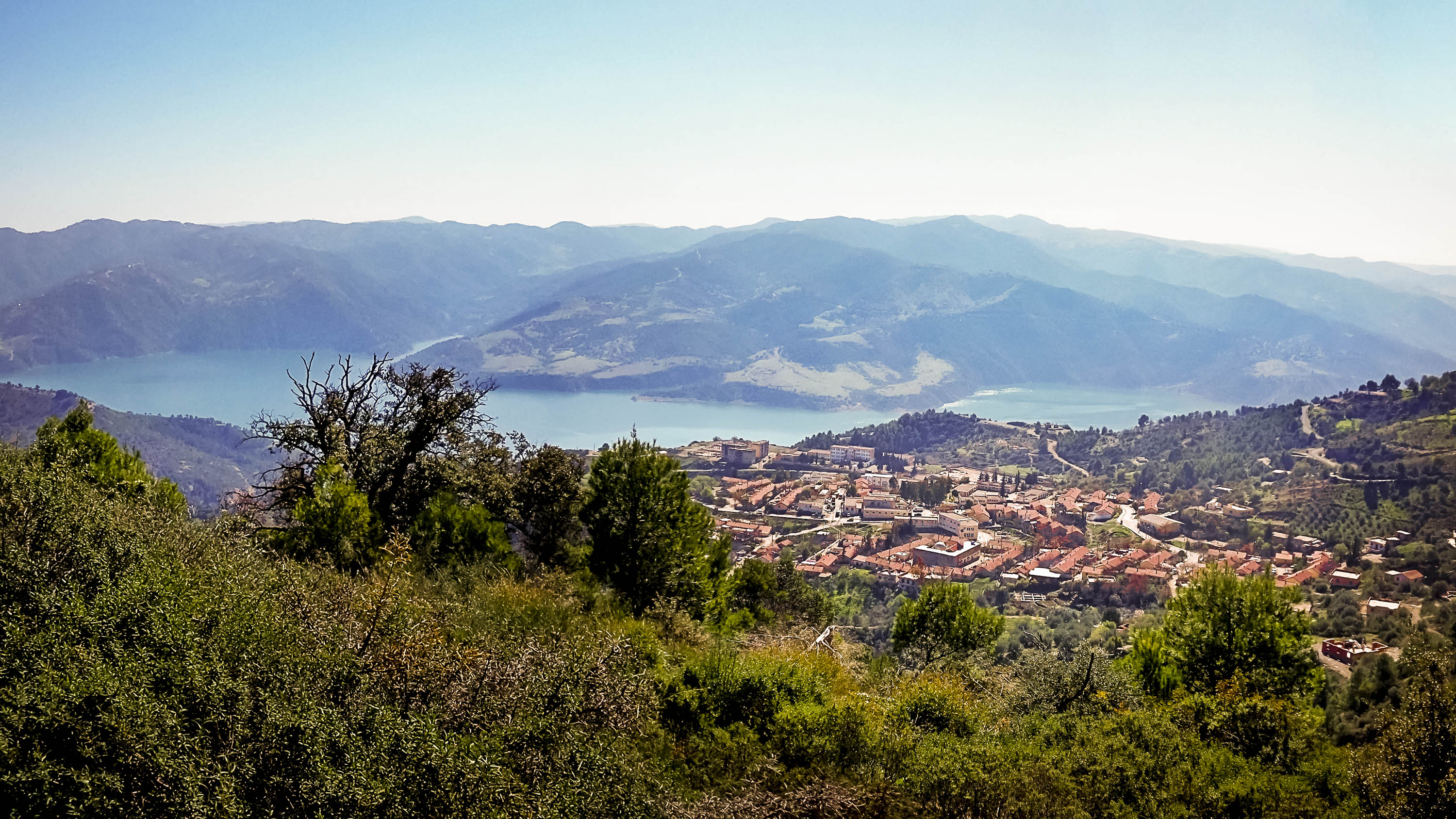
- Interactive map of Zbarbar
- Country: Algeria
- Province: Bouïra Province

Population (1998)
  - Total: 4,525
- Time zone: UTC+1 (CET)

Zbarbar is a town and commune in Bouïra Province, Algeria. According to the 1998 census, it has a population of 4,525.

== Notable people ==
- Mohamed Aïchaoui (1921–1959), journalist, militant, and martyr
