= Ouled Rached =

Coordinates: 36°12′43″N 4°06′38″E

- Commune and town
- Interactive map of Ouled Rached
- Country: Algeria
- Province: Bouïra Province

Population (1998)
  - Total: 8,553
- Time zone: UTC+1 (CET)

Ouled Rached is a town and commune in Bouïra Province, Algeria. According to the 1998 census it has a population of 8,553.
