= El Khabouzia =

- Commune and town
- Interactive map of El Khabouzia
- Coordinates: 36°18′59″N 3°36′03″E
- Country: Algeria
- Province: Bouïra Province

Population (1998)
  - Total: 5,572
- Time zone: UTC+1 (CET)

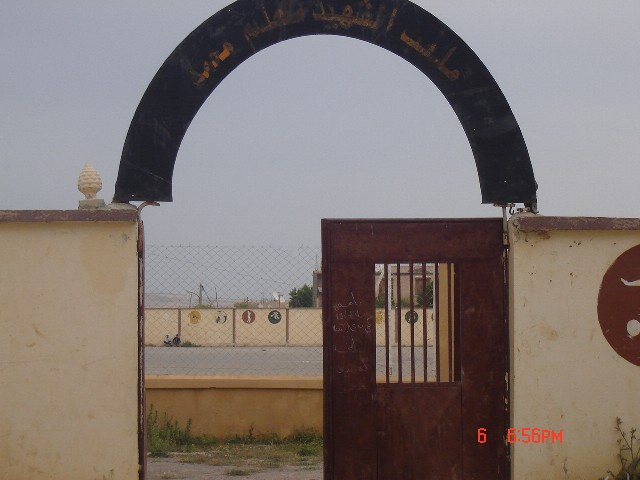
Entrance gate to the football stadium in El Khabouzia

El Khabouzia is a town and commune in Bouïra Province, Algeria. According to the 1998 census it has a population of 5,572.
