= Djebahia =

Djebahia la pirine
- Commune and town
- Interactive map of Djebahia
- Coordinates: 36°28′37″N 3°45′29″E
- Country algeria: Algeria
- Province: Bouïra Province

Population (1998)
  - Total: 14,630
- Time zone: UTC+1 (CET)
- Postal code: 10036

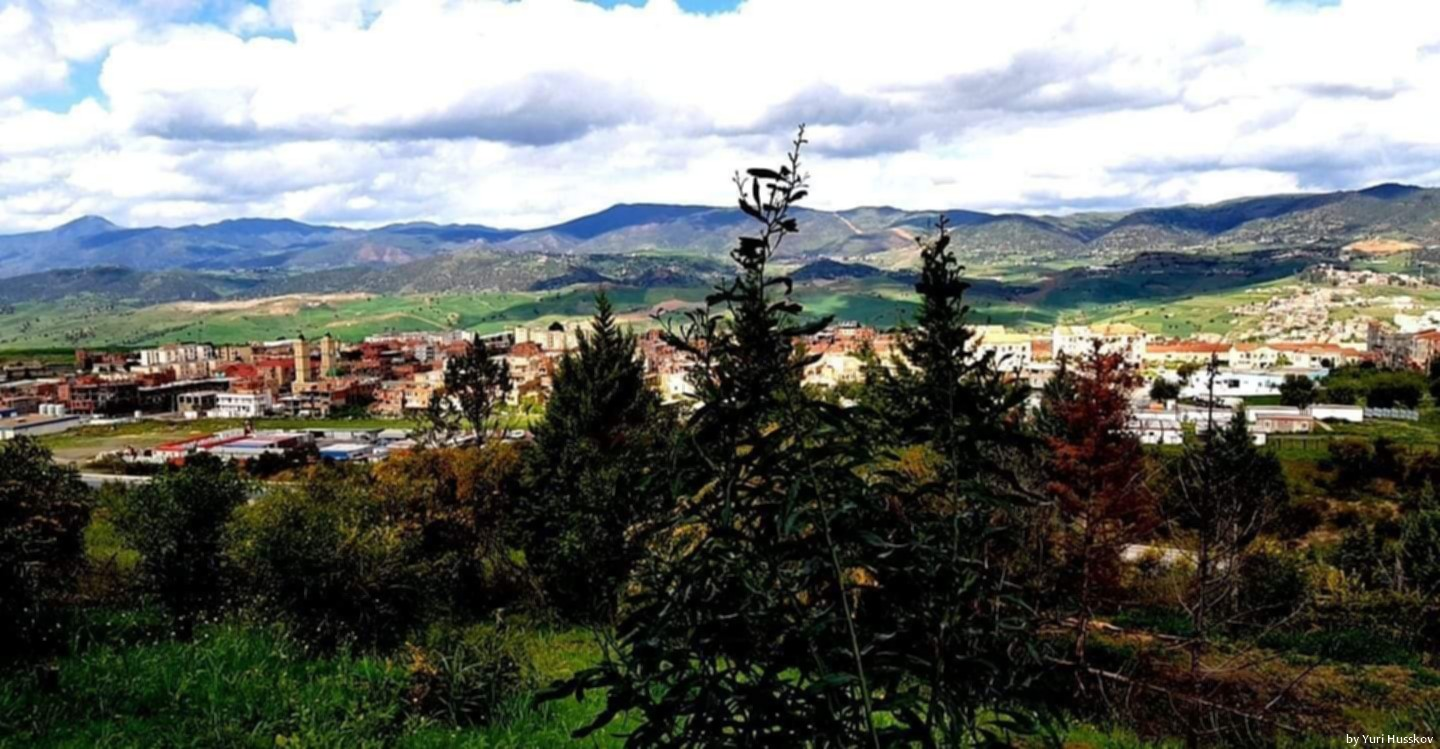
Panoramic view of the village of Djebahia

Djebahia is a town and commune in Bouïra Province, Algeria. According to the 1998 census it has a population of 14,630.
