= Bouderbala =

Coordinates: 36°34′48″N 3°30′32″E

- Commune and town
- Interactive map of Bouderbala
- Country: Algeria
- Province: Bouïra Province

Population (1998)
  - Total: 16,697
- Time zone: UTC+1 (CET)

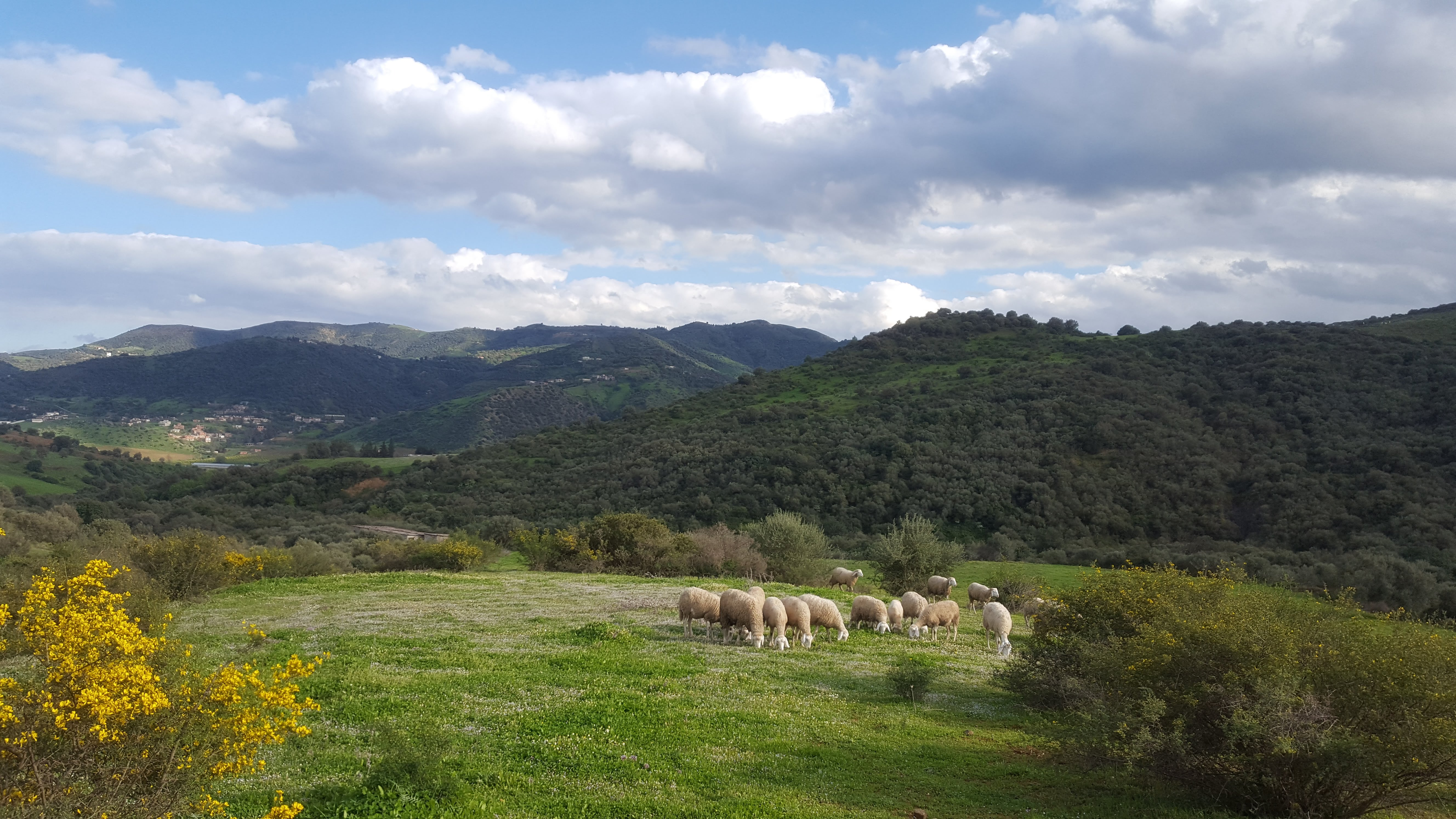
Bouderbala, Bouira (Algeria)

Bouderbala is a town and commune in Bouïra Province, Algeria. According to the 1998 census it has a population of 16,697.
