= Hadjera Zerga =

Coordinates: 35°57′28″N 3°50′58″E

- Commune and town
- Interactive map of Hadjera Zerga
- Country: Algeria
- Province: Bouïra Province

Population (1998)
  - Total: 3,216
- Time zone: UTC+1 (CET)

Hadjera Zerga is a town and commune in Bouïra Province, Algeria. According to the 1998 census it has a population of 3,216.
