= Maamora =

Coordinates: 35°57′30″N 3°37′13″E

- Commune and town
- Interactive map of Maamora
- Country: Algeria
- Province: Bouïra Province

Population (1998)
  - Total: 3,569
- Time zone: UTC+1 (CET)

Maamora is a town and commune in Bouïra Province, Algeria. According to the 1998 census it has a population of 3,569.
