= Dechmia =

Coordinates: 36°07′48″N 3°34′36″E

- Commune and town
- Interactive map of Dechmia
- Country: Algeria
- Province: Bouïra Province

Population (1998)
  - Total: 7,466
- Time zone: UTC+1 (CET)

Dechmia is a town and commune in Bouïra Province, Algeria. According to the 1998 census it has a population of 7,466.
