= Mezdour =

Coordinates: 36°04′48″N 4°04′14″E

- Commune and town
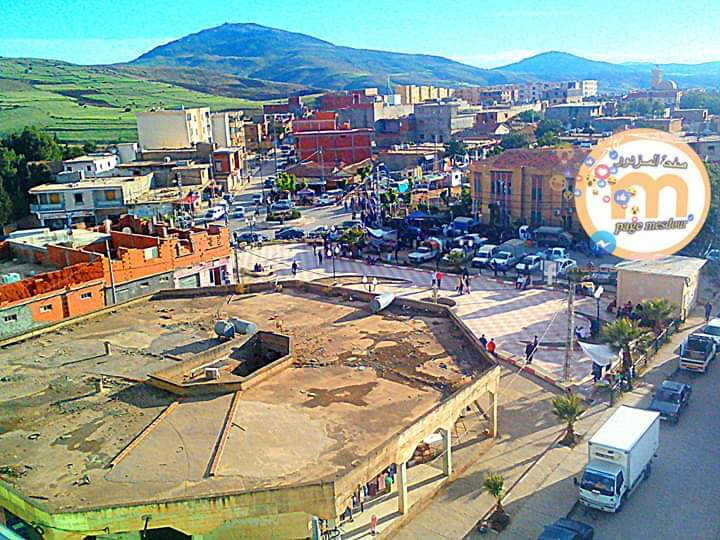
- Interactive map of Mezdour
- Country: Algeria
- Province: Bouïra Province

Population (1998)
  - Total: 10,723
- Time zone: UTC+1 (CET)

Mezdour is a town and commune in Bouïra Province, Algeria. According to the 1998 census it has a population of 10,723.
