= Ahl El Ksar =

Coordinates: 36.2531°N 4.03944°E

- Commune and town
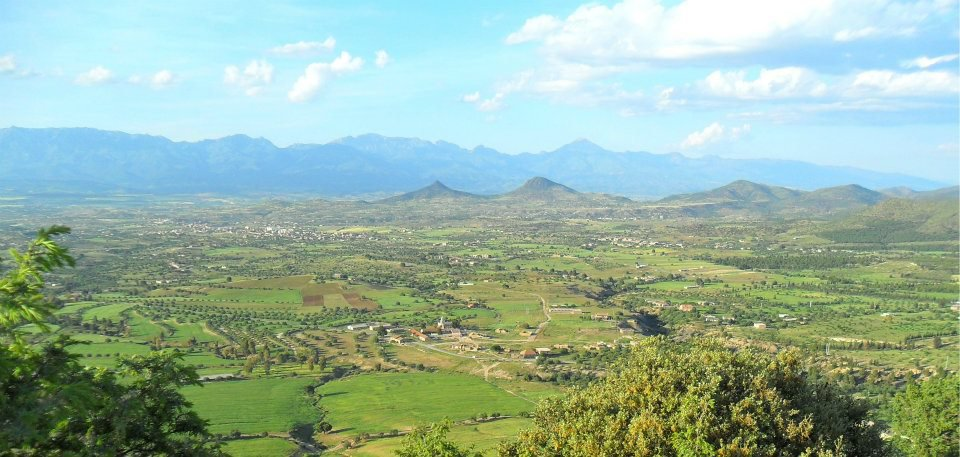
- Interactive map of Ahl El Ksar
- Country: Algeria
- Province: Bouïra Province

Population (1998)
  - Total: 12,315
- Time zone: UTC+1 (CET)

Ahl El Ksar is a town and commune in Bouïra Province, Algeria. According to the 1998 census, it has a population of 12,315.
