= Bordj Okhriss =

Coordinates: 36°05′N 3°58′E

- Commune and town
- Interactive map of Bordj Okhriss
- Country: Algeria
- Province: Bouïra Province

Population (1998)
  - Total: 8,937
- Time zone: UTC+1 (CET)

Bordj Okhriss is a town and commune in Bouïra Province, Algeria. As of the 1998 census it had a population of 8,937.
