= Souk El Khemis =

Coordinates: 36°23′17″N 3°38′06″E

Souk El Khemis الخميس السوق
- Commune and town
- Nickname: Thursday Market
- Interactive map of Souk El Khemis
- Country: Algeria
- Province: Bouïra Province

Population (1998)
  - Total: 8,039
- Time zone: UTC+1 (CET)

Souk El Khemis is a town and commune in Bouïra Province, Algeria. According to the 1998 census it had a population of 8,039. The town is located at 36° 23' 17" N, 3° 38' 6" E and the name means Thursday Market.

The ruins of an ancient Roman town called Tatilti are nearby Souk El Khemis.

== See also ==
- Souk El Khemis, Tunisia
