= Ridane =

Coordinates: 36°04′N 3°28′E

- Commune and town
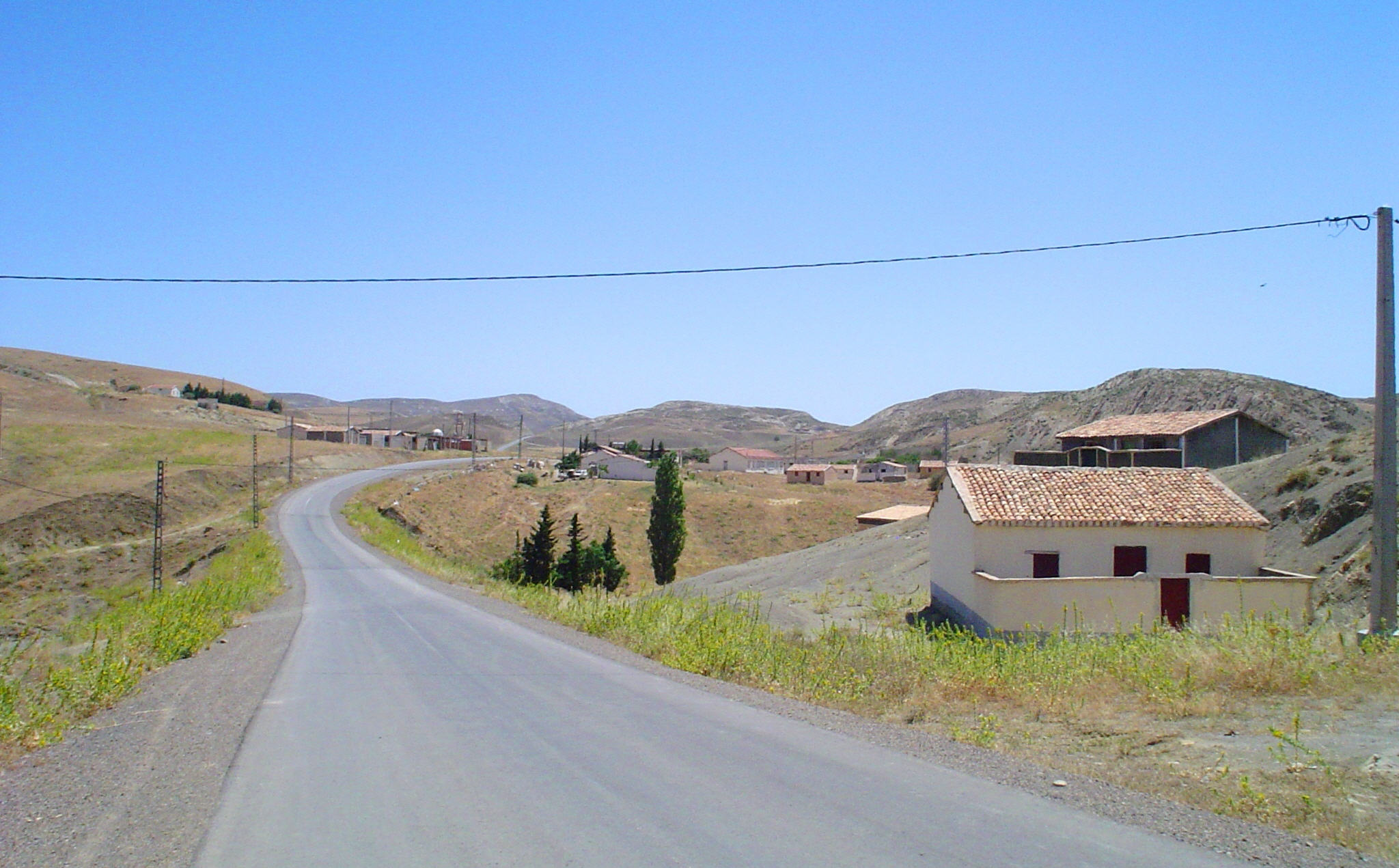
- Ridane, Algeria
- Interactive map of Ridane
- Country: Algeria
- Province: Bouïra Province

Population (1998)
  - Total: 3,029
- Time zone: UTC+1 (CET)

Ridane is a town and commune in Bouïra Province, Algeria. According to the 1998 census it has a population of 3,029.
