= Aïn Turk, Bouïra =

Coordinates: 36°21′36″N 3°54′00″E

Aïn Turk عين ترك
- Commune and town
- Interactive map of Aïn Turk
- Country: Algeria
- Province: Bouïra Province
- Time zone: UTC+1 (CET)

Aïn Turk (Arabic: عين ترك) nearby Bouira (Algeria) is a commune in Bouïra Province, Algeria. It is about 100 km from Algiers.

== Landmarks ==
On its northeast is the Marble Valley Bridge - one of the biggest in Africa, with a 200-meter main span and 120 meter stems. The viaduct is completed in October 2008; its total length is 745 metres. It is situated in the middle of the National Algerian Highway Project.

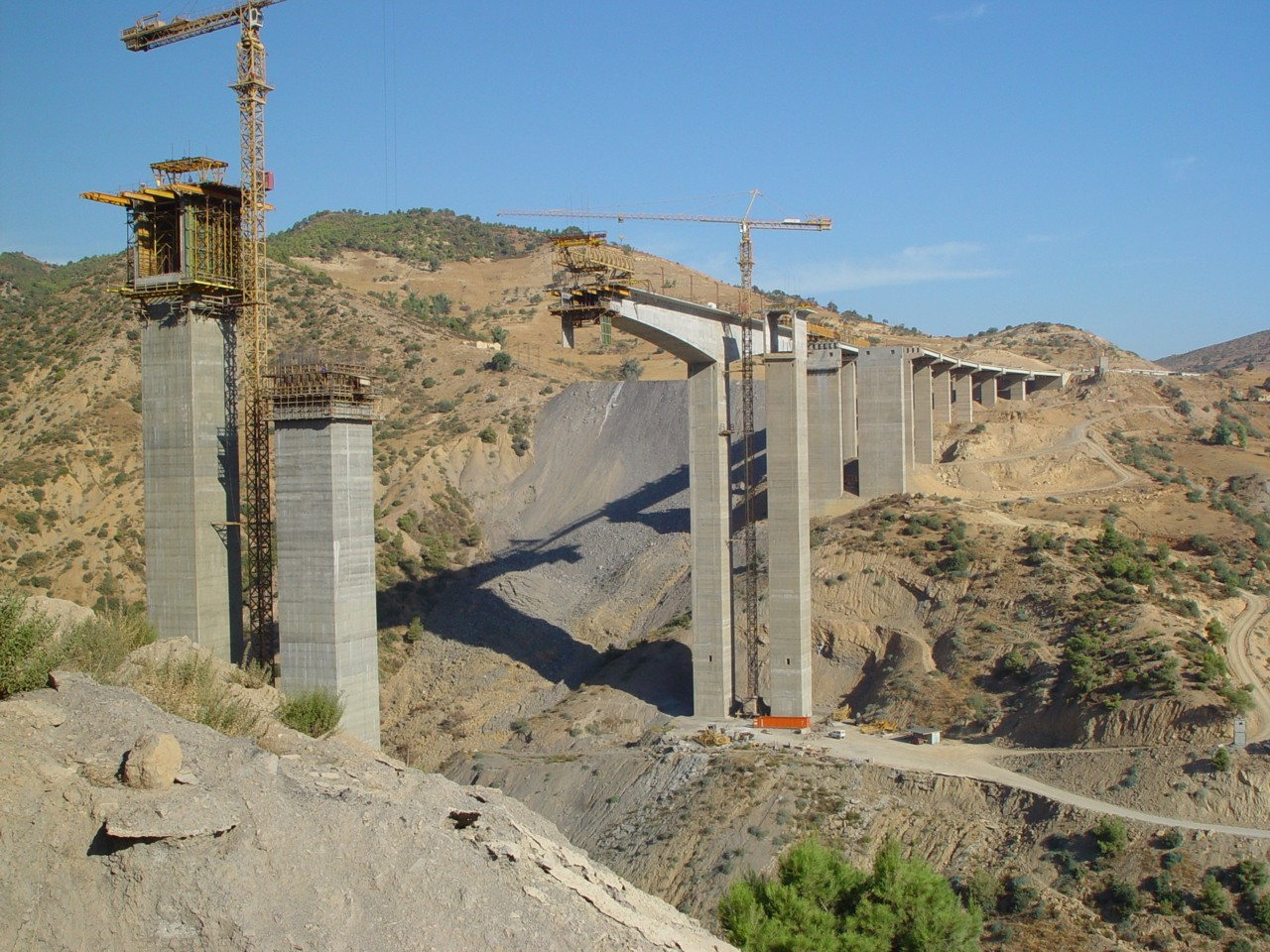
Marble Valley Bridge under construction.
