= Saharidj =

Coordinates: 36°23′49″N 4°14′55″E

- Commune and town
- Interactive map of Saharidj
- Country: Algeria
- Province: Bouïra Province

Population (1998)
  - Total: 9,142
- Time zone: UTC+1 (CET)

Saharidj is a town and commune in Bouïra Province, Algeria. According to the 1998 census it has a population of 9,142.
