= El Asnam, Bouïra =

Coordinates: 36°19′16″N 4°00′50″E

- Commune and town
- Interactive map of El Asnam, Bouïra
- Country: Algeria
- Province: Bouïra Province

Population (1998)
  - Total: 12,060
- Time zone: UTC+1 (CET)

El Asnam, Bouïra is a town and commune in Bouïra Province, Algeria. According to the 1998 census it has a population of 12,060.
