= Aghbalou, Algeria =

Aghbalou
- Commune and Town
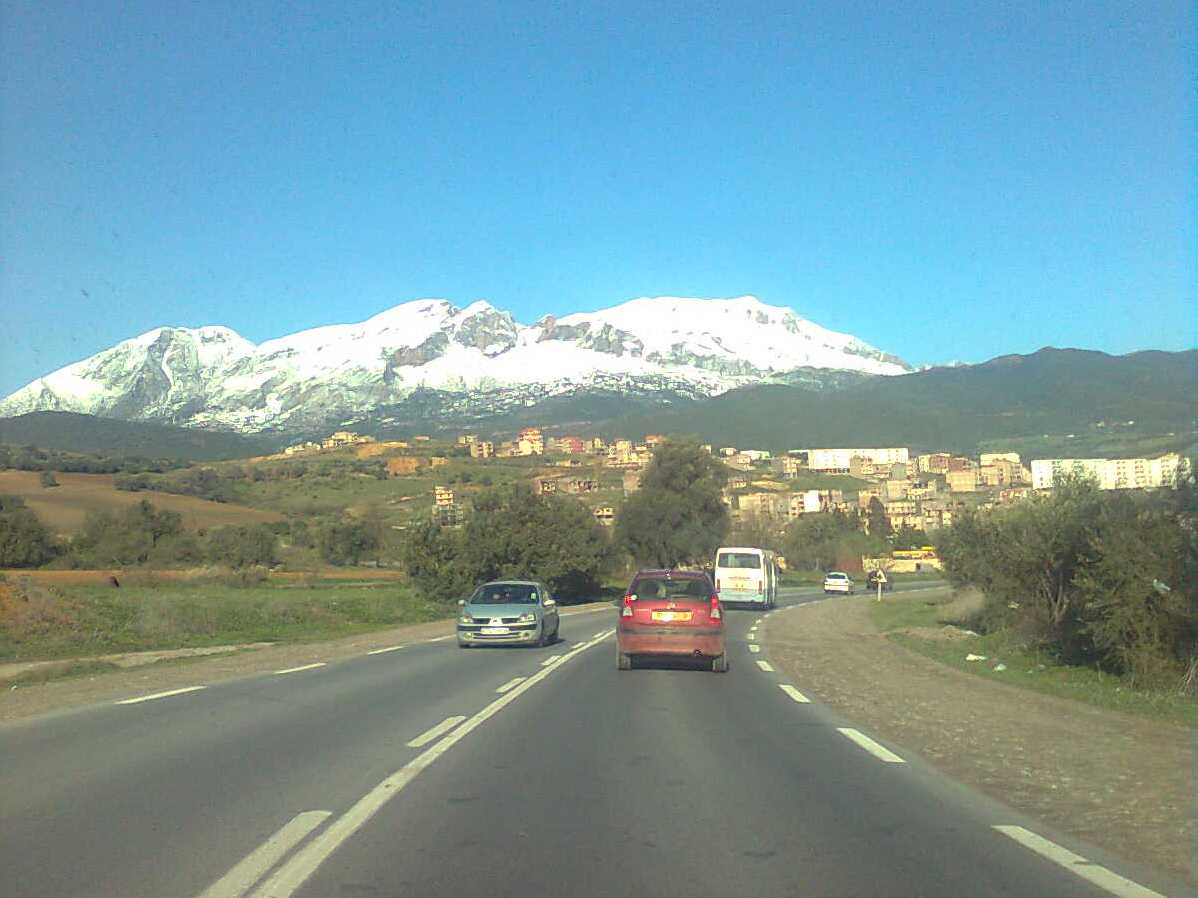

- Location of Aghbalou within Bouïra Province

- Location of Aghbalou within Algeria
- Country: Algeria
- Province: Bouïra Province

Population (1998)
  - Total: 19,530
- Time zone: UTC+1 (CET)

Aghbalou is a town and commune in Bouïra Province, Algeria. According to the 1998 census it has a population of 19,530.
