= Aïn Laloui =

Coordinates: 36°19′N 3°45′E

Ain Laloui
- Commune and town
- Interactive map of Ain Laloui
- Country: Algeria
- Province: Bouïra Province

Population (1998)
  - Total: 5,893
- Time zone: UTC+1 (CET)

Ain Laloui is a town and commune in Bouïra Province, Algeria. According to the 1998 census, it has a population of 5,893.
