= Maala =

- Commune and town
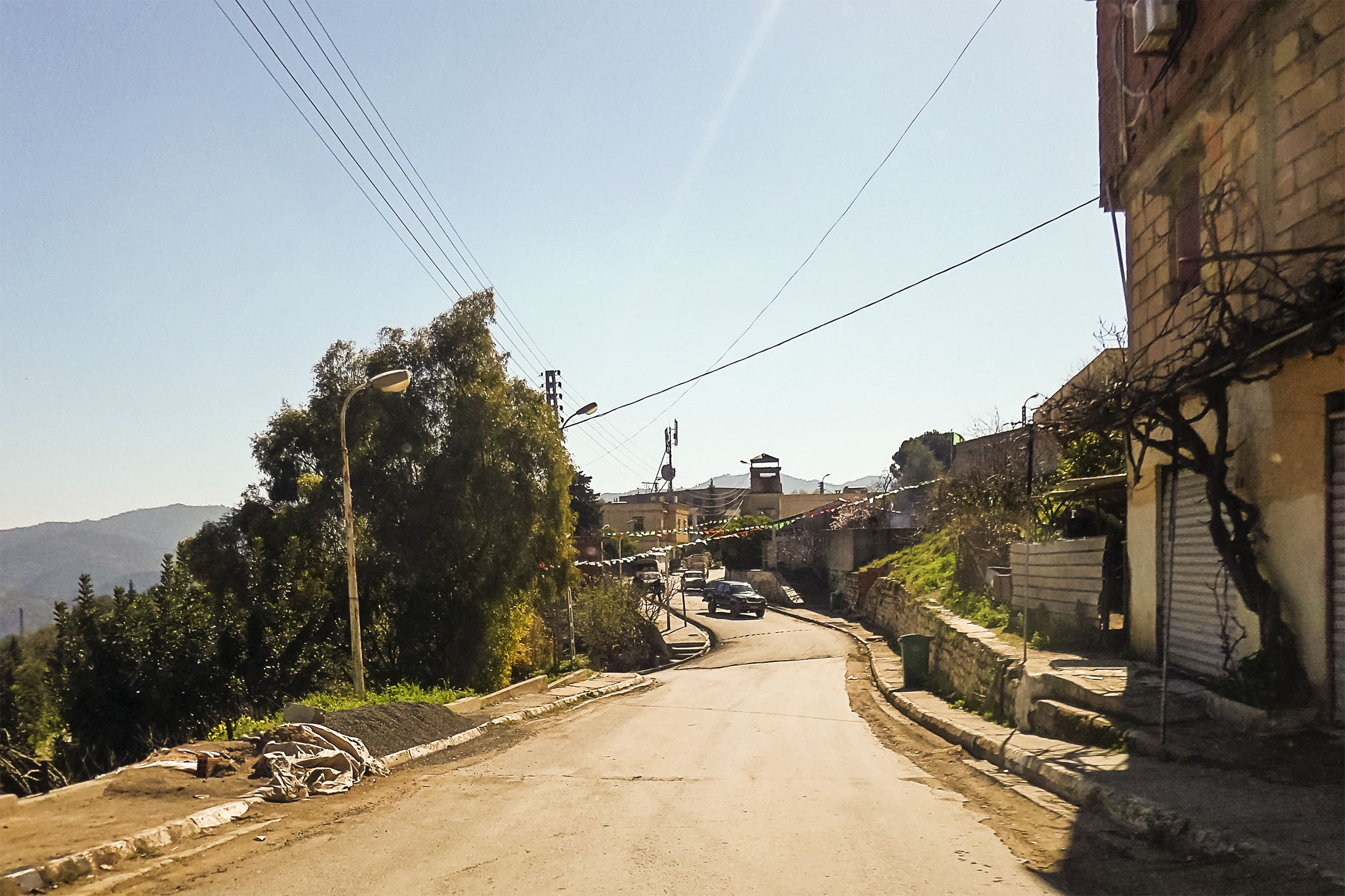

- Location within Algeria
- Country: Algeria
- Province: Bouïra Province

Population (1998)
  - Total: 5,806
- Time zone: UTC+1 (CET)

Maala is a town and commune in Bouïra Province, Algeria. According to the 1998 census it has a population of 5,806.
