= El Hakimia =

Coordinates: 36°05′28″N 3°46′50″E

- Commune and town
- Interactive map of El Hakimia
- Country: Algeria
- Province: Bouïra Province

Population (1998)
  - Total: 2,213
- Time zone: UTC+1 (CET)

El Hakimia is a town and commune in Bouïra Province, Algeria. According to the 1998 census it has a population of 2,213.
