= Raouraoua =

Coordinates: 36°14′08″N 3°38′49″E

- Commune and town
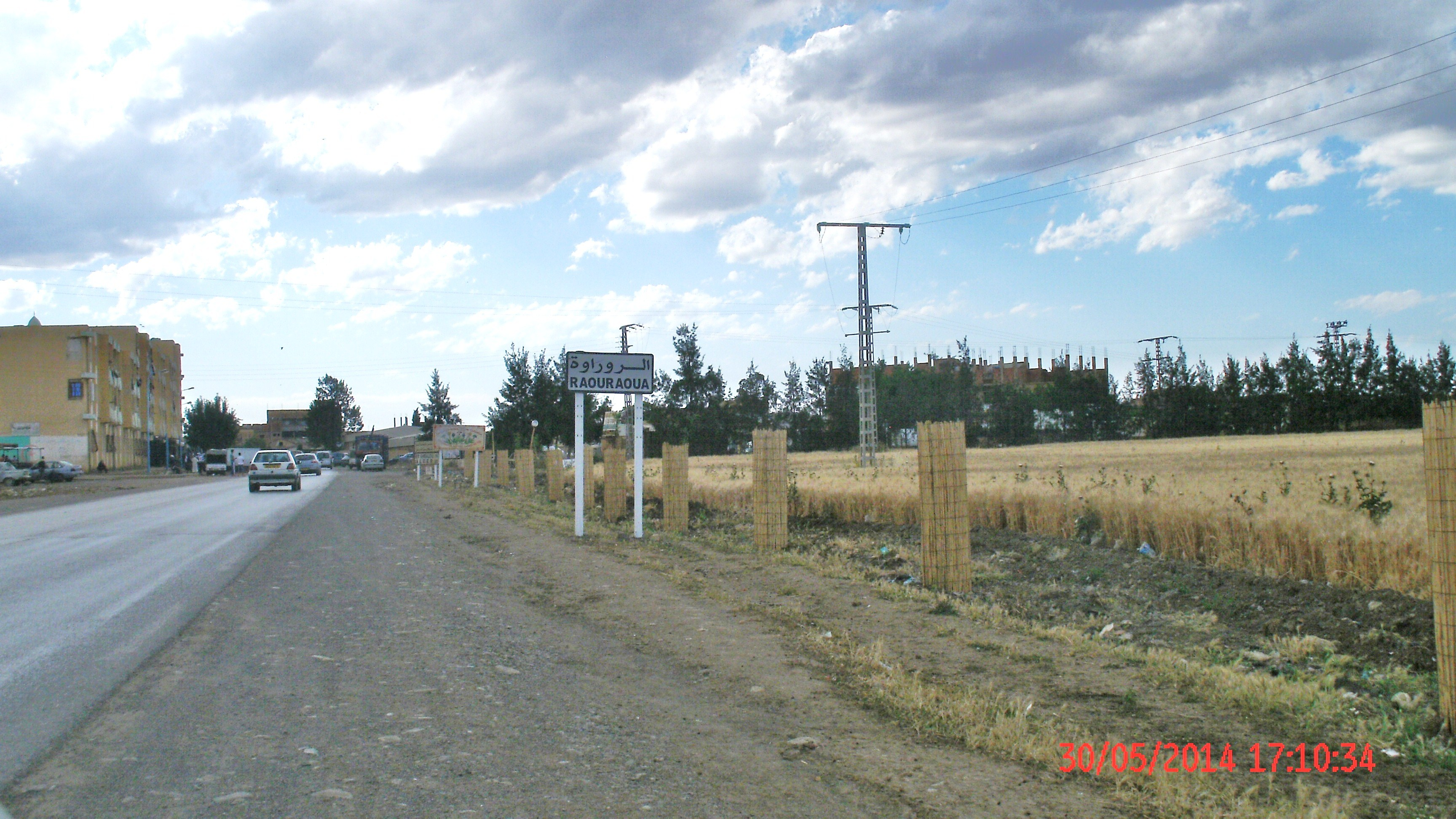

- Country: Algeria
- Province: Bouïra Province

Population (1998)
  - Total: 7,209
- Time zone: UTC+1 (CET)

Raouraoua is a town and commune in Bouïra Province, Algeria. According to the 1998 census it has a population of 7,209.
