= Aït Laziz =

- Commune and town
- Location within Algeria
- Coordinates: 36°26′41″N 3°54′31″E
- Country: Algeria
- Province: Bouïra Province

Population (1998)
  - Total: 14,056
- Time zone: UTC+1 (CET)

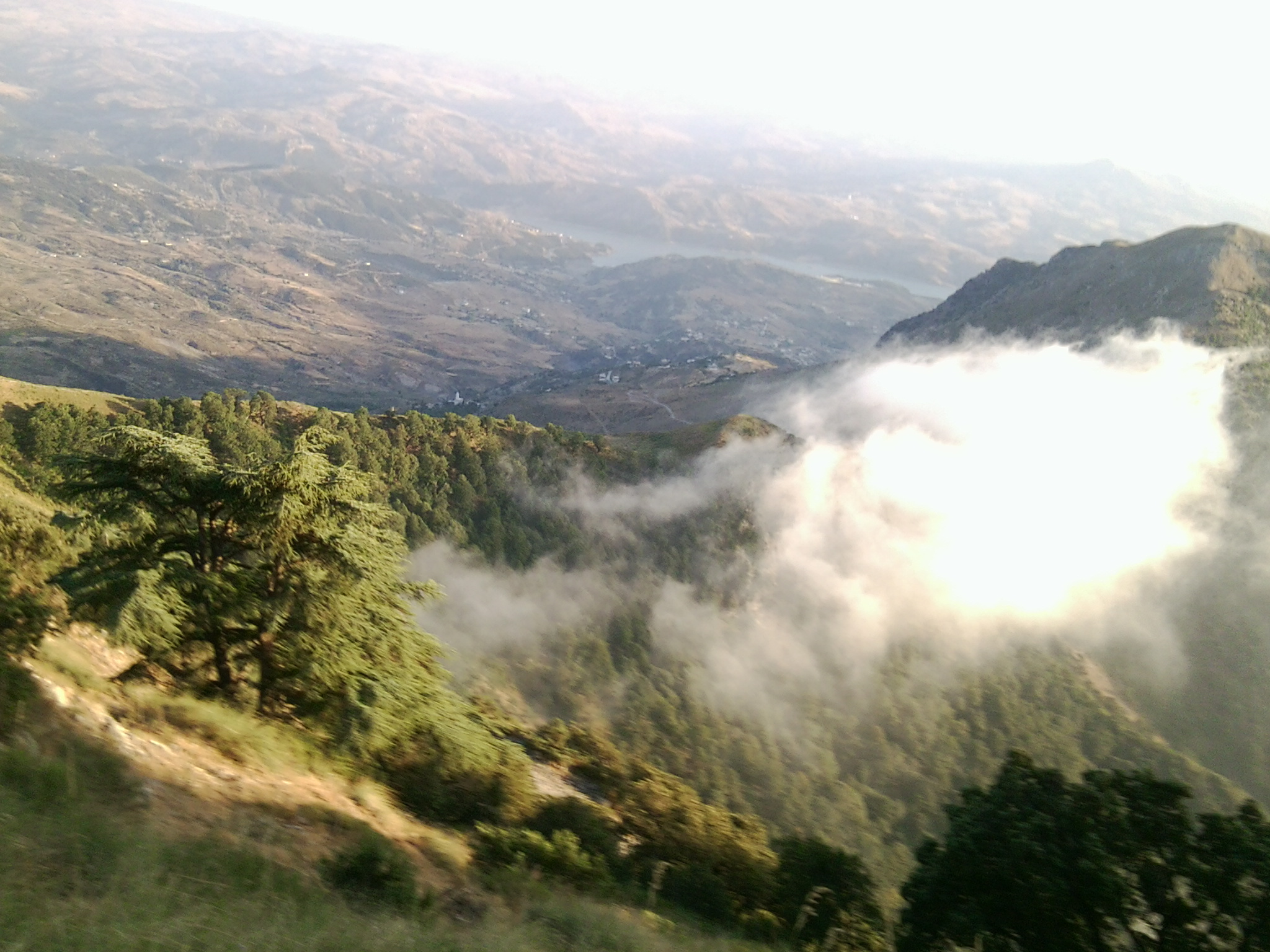
A section of the Babor Mountains in Aït Laziz

Aït Laziz is a town and commune in Bouïra Province, Algeria. According to the 1998 census it has a population of 14,056.
