= Haizer =

Haizer حيزر
- Commune and town
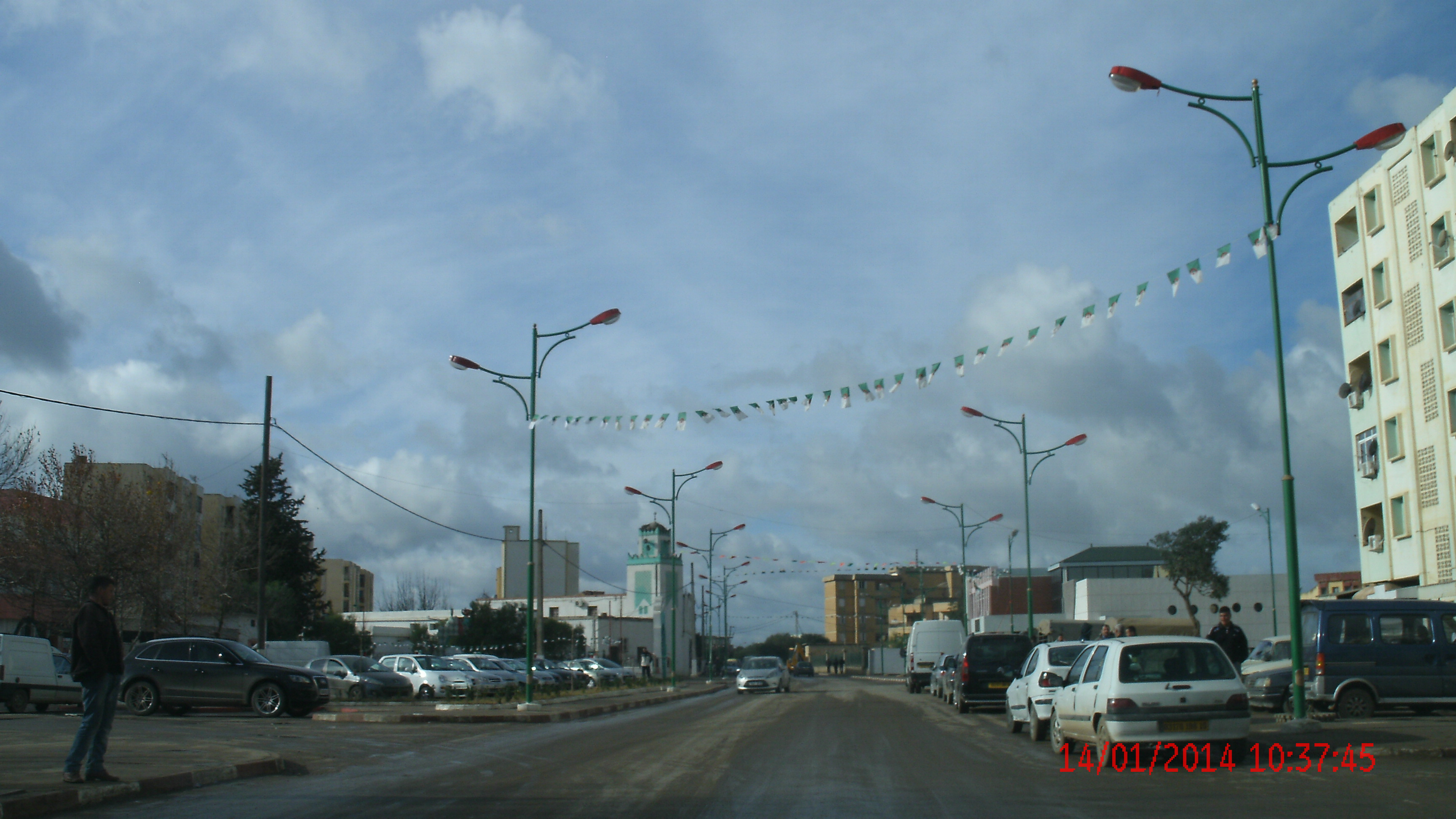

- Location within Algeria
- Coordinates: 36.397020°N 3.999170°W
- Country: Algeria
- Province: Bouïra Province
- District: Haïzer District

Population (1998)
  - Total: 20,669
- Time zone: UTC+1 (CET)
- Postal code: 10024

Haizer is a town and commune in Bouïra Province, Algeria. According to the 1998 census it has a population of 15,388.
