= Taghzout, Bouïra =

Taghzout
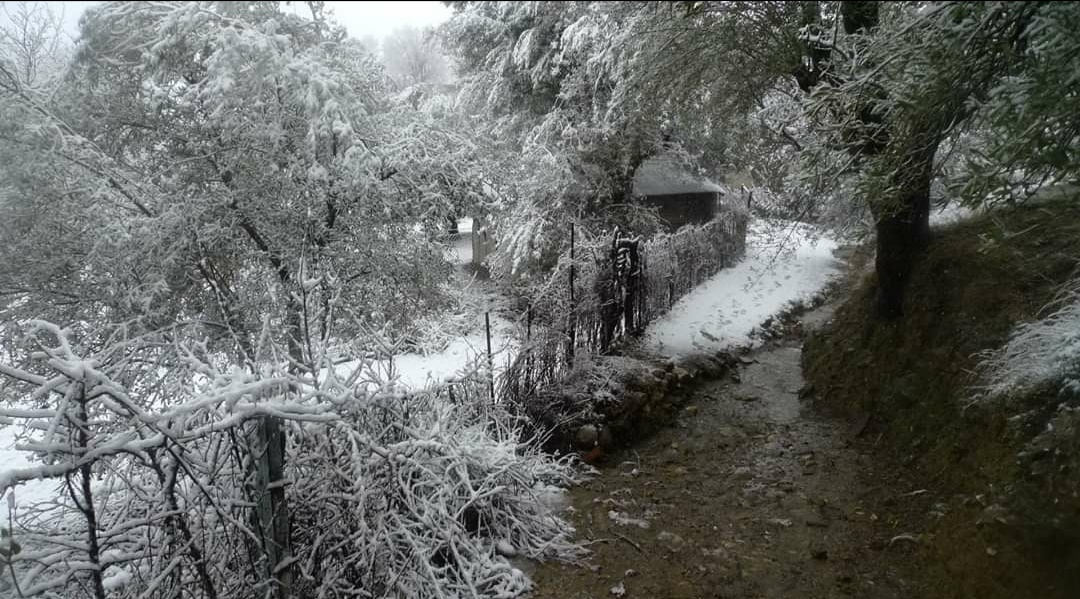

- Location within Algeria
- Coordinates: 36°24′31″N 3°57′34″E
- Country: Algeria
- Province: Bouïra

Population (2008)
  - Total: 13,203
- Time zone: UTC+1 (West Africa Time)

Taghzout is a town and commune in Bouïra Province, Algeria.
