= Boukram =

Coordinates: 36°32′29″N 3°23′50″E

- Commune and town
- Interactive map of Boukram
- Country: Algeria
- Province: Bouïra Province

Population (1998)
  - Total: 6,275
- Time zone: UTC+1 (CET)

Boukram is a town and commune in Bouïra Province, Algeria. According to the 1998 census it has a population of 6,275.
