= Guerrouma =

Coordinates: 36°29′N 3°26′E

- Commune and town
- Interactive map of Guerrouma
- Country: Algeria
- Province: Bouïra Province

Population (1998)
  - Total: 15,306
- Time zone: UTC+1 (CET)

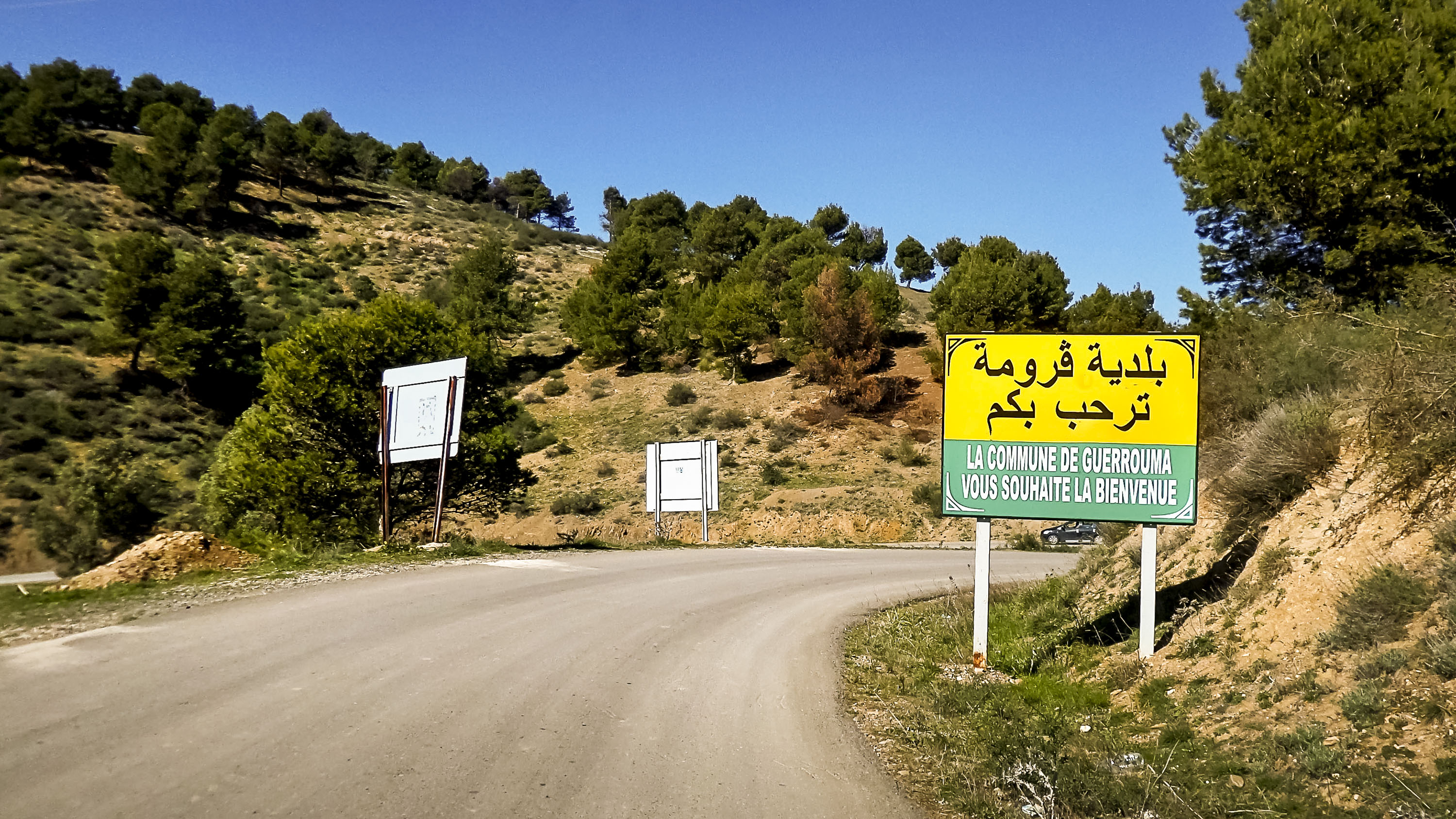
Guerrouma

Guerrouma is a town and commune in Bouïra Province, Algeria. According to the 1998 census it has a population of 15,306.
