= El Hachimia =

Coordinates: 36°14′N 3°50′E

- Commune and town
- Interactive map of El Hachimia
- Country: Algeria
- Province: Bouïra Province

Population (1998)
  - Total: 13,482
- Time zone: UTC+1 (CET)

El Hachimia is a town and commune in Bouïra Province, Algeria. According to the 1998 census it has a population of 13,482.
