= Aomar =

Aomar عمر Brachema ( Aomar Gare )
- Bouira - Algeria

- Location within Algeria
- Country: Algeria
- Province: Bouïra Province

Population (2011)
  - Total: 28,540
- Time zone: UTC+1 (CET)

Aomar is a town and commune in Bouïra Province, Algeria. According to the 2011 census it has a population of 28,540.
