= Bouïra Province =

Province of Algeria

Bouïra Province ولاية البويرة
- Province
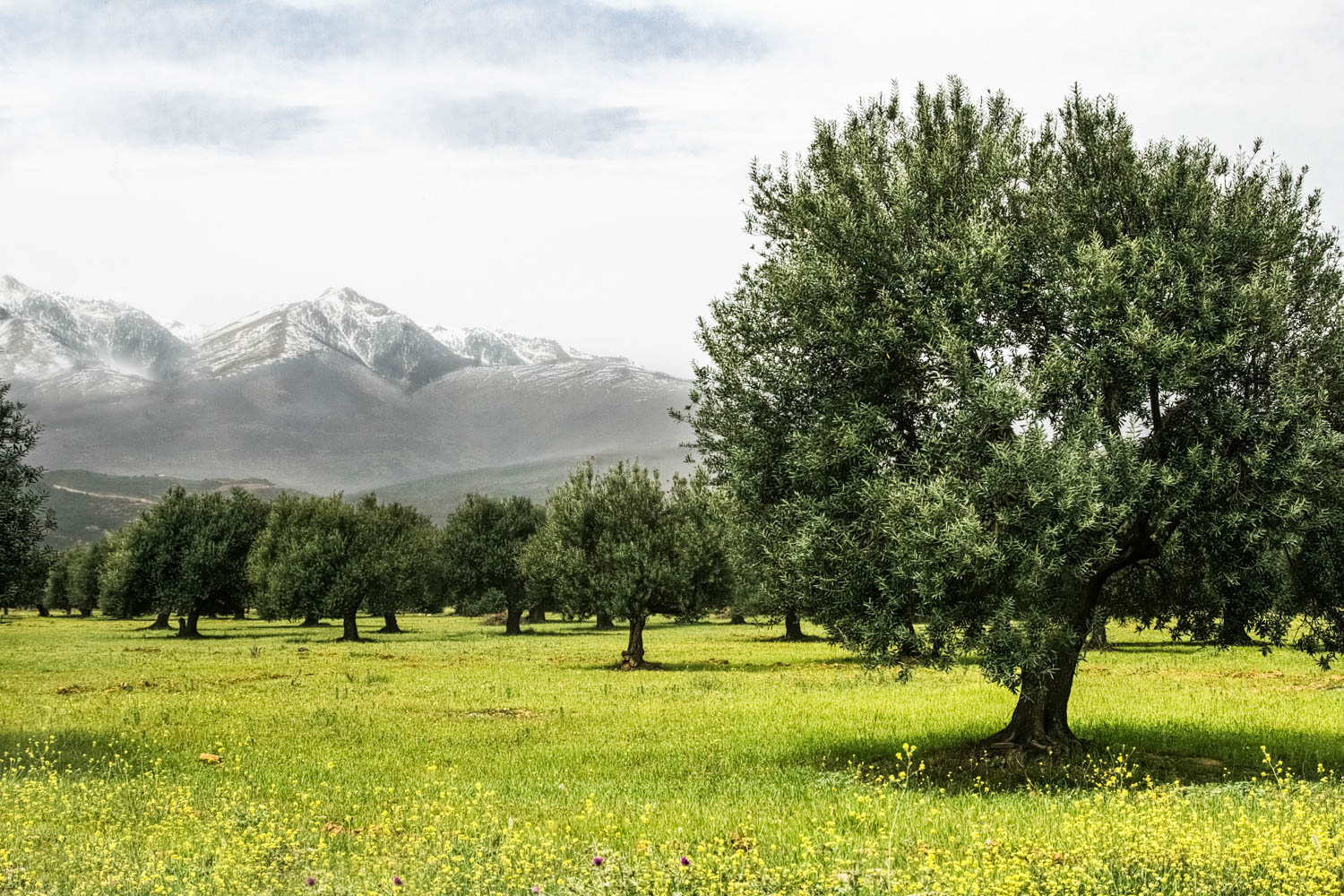
- Olive trees growing in Bouïra Province

- Map of Algeria highlighting Bouïra
- Coordinates: 36°23′N 3°54′E
- Country: Algeria
- Founded: 1974
- Capital: Bouïra

Government
  - Wāli: Mouloud Cherifi

Area
  - Total: 4,439 km^{2} (1,714 sq mi)

Population (2008)
  - Total: 694,750
  - Density: 156.5/km^{2} (405.4/sq mi)
- Time zone: UTC+01 (CET)
- Area Code: +213 (0) 26
- ISO 3166 code: DZ-10
- Districts: 12
- Municipalities: 45

Bouïra (Arabic: ولاية البويرة) is a province (wilaya) in Algeria.

== History ==
The province was created from parts of Médéa (département) and Tizi-Ouzou department in 1974.

== Administrative divisions ==
It is made up of 12 districts and 45 communes or municipalities.

=== Districts ===
1. Aïn Bessem
2. Bechloul
3. Bir Ghbalou
4. Bordj Okhriss
5. Bouïra
6. El Hachimia
7. Haïzer
8. Kadiria
9. Lakhdaria
10. M'Chedellah
11. Souk El Khemis
12. Sour El Ghozlane

=== Communes ===
1. Aïn Bessem
2. Ahnif
3. Aghbalou
4. Aïn El Hadjar
5. Ahl El Ksar
6. Ain Laloui
7. Ath Mansour Taourirt
8. Aomar
9. Aïn Turk (Ain el Turc)
10. Ait Laziz
11. Bouderbala
12. Bechloul
13. Bir Ghbalou
14. Bouiche
15. Boukram
16. Bordj Okhriss
17. Bouira
18. Dechmia
19. Dirrah
20. Djebahia
21. El Asnam
22. El Hakimia
23. El Hachimia
24. El Adjiba
25. El Khabouzia
26. El Mokrani
27. Guerrouma
28. Haizer
29. Hadjera Zerga
30. Kadiria
31. Lakhdaria
32. M'Chedallah
33. Mezdour
34. Maala
35. Maamora
36. Oued El Berdi
37. Ouled Rached
38. Raouraoua
39. Ridane
40. Saharidj
41. Sour El Ghouzlane
42. Souk El Khemis
43. Taguedit
44. Taghzout
45. Zbarbar

== Notable people ==
- Mohamed Aïchaoui, journalist, militant and martyr
