= Kadiria =

Kadiria قادرية
- Commune and town
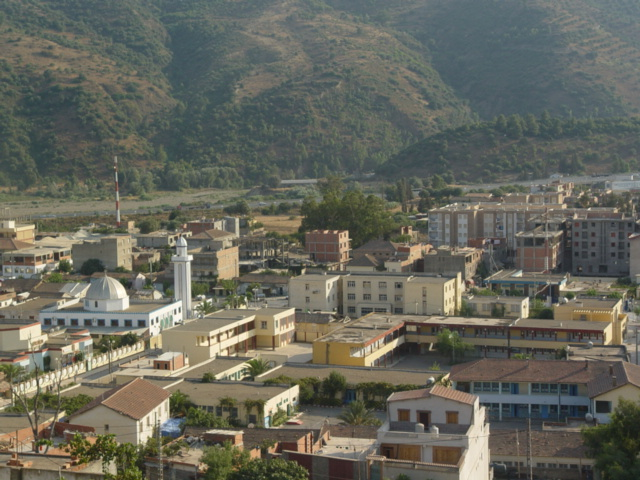
- Kadiria

- Coordinates: 36.533333°N 3.683333°E
- Country: Algeria
- Province: Bouïra Province

Area
  - Total: 36 sq mi (94 km^{2})

Population (2008)
  - Total: 22,327
- Time zone: UTC+1 (CET)
- CP: 10006

Kadiria is a town and commune in Bouïra Province, Algeria. According to the 1998 census it has a population of 17,923.
