= Aïn El Hadjar, Bouïra =

Aïn El Hadjar عين الحجر Aboutville
- Commune and town
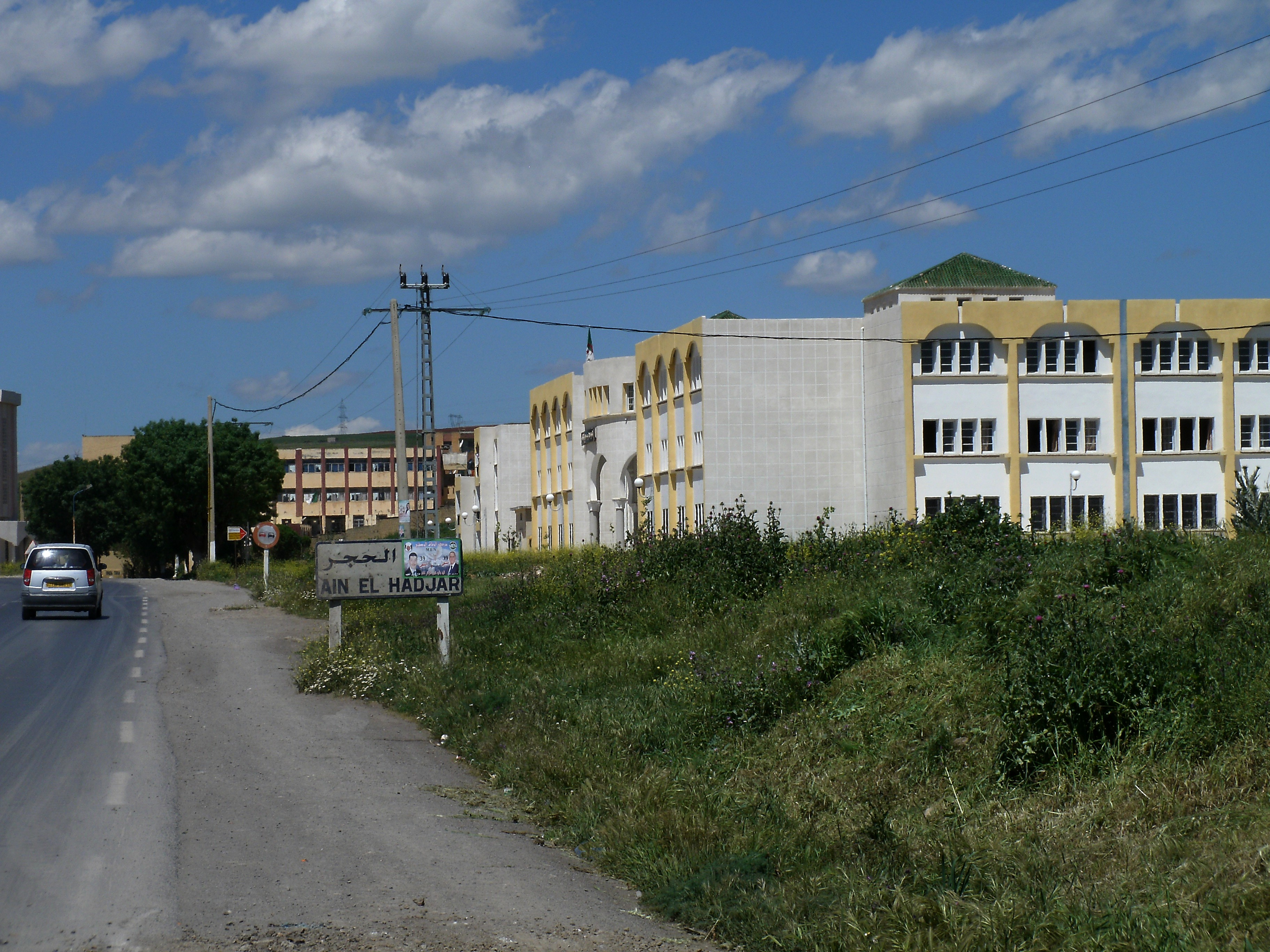

- Location within Algeria
- Coordinates: 36°20′21″N 3°48′23″W
- Country: Algeria
- Province: Bouïra Province

Population (2008)
  - Total: 9,260
- Time zone: UTC+1 (CET)

Aïn El Hadjar, also known as عين الحجر, is a town and commune in Bouïra Province, Algeria. The town is in the mountains, 10 km south of Saida and is services by Algerian Railways.

== History ==
Aïn El Hadjar has been tentatively identified as the Roman town of Centuria (Numidia) in Roman North Africa.

During the French colonization the town was known as Aboutville. In 1958, the city then named Aboutville, was part of the former department of MEDEA After independence, it takes the name of Aïn El Hadjar.

According to the 1998 census it has a population of 7,988. by the 2008 Census this had increased to 9260 inhabitants.
