= Oued El Berdi =

Coordinates: 36°17′20″N 3°55′08″E

Oued El Berdi, Algeria
- Commune and town
- Interactive map of Oued El Berdi, Algeria
- Country: Algeria
- Province: Bouïra Province

Population (1998)
  - Total: 9,221
- Time zone: UTC+1 (CET)

Oued El Berdi is a town and commune in Bouïra Province, Algeria. According to the 1998 census it has a population of 9,221.
