= A2 motorway (Algeria) =

Freeway in Algeria

A2 autoroute
- Autoroute de l'Est
- East Highway
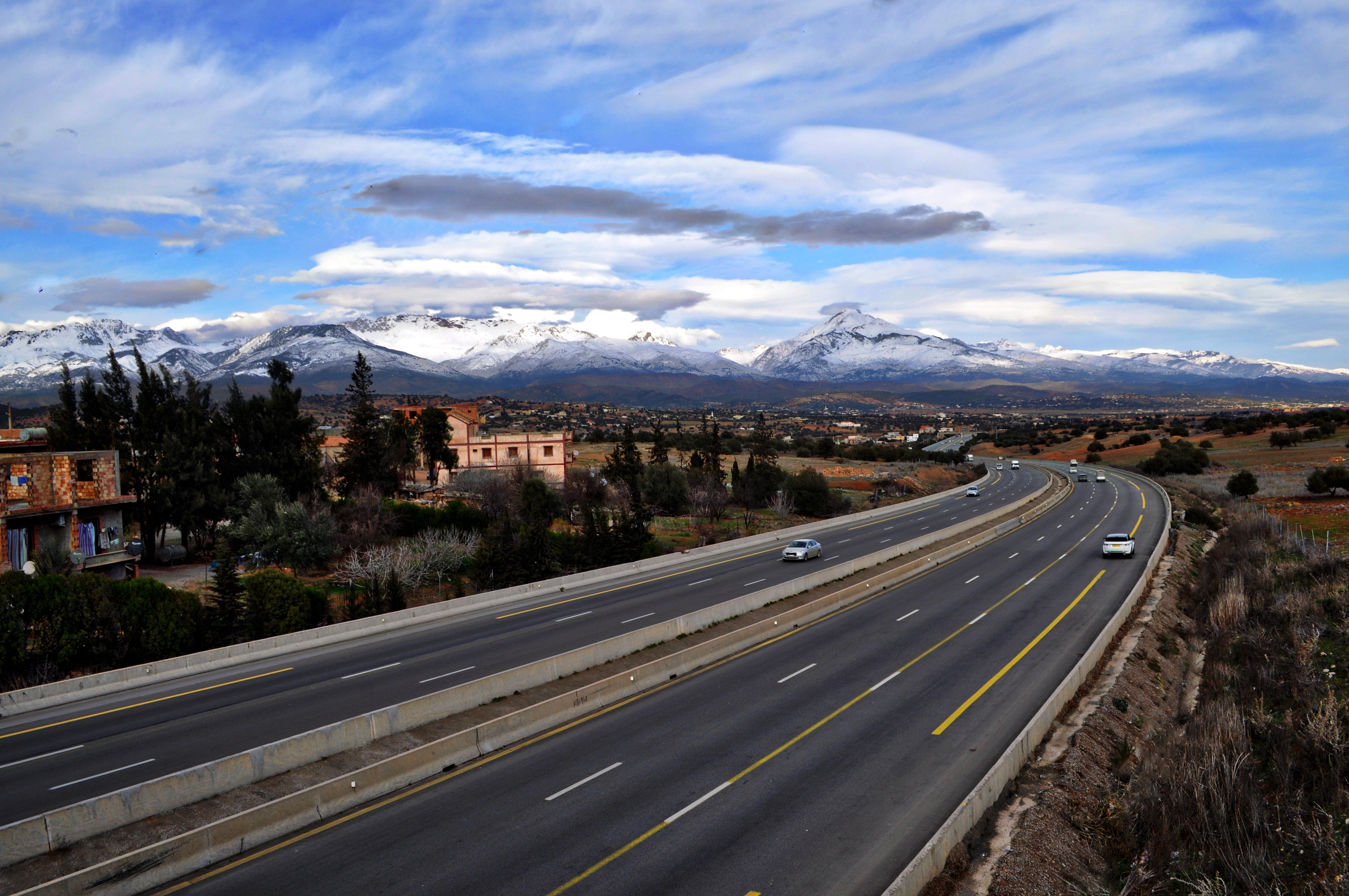

Route information
- Length: 614 km (382 mi)
- Status: Operational

Major junctions
- East end: Algeria-Tunisia border
- West end: Algiers

Location
- Country: Algeria
- Provinces: Algiers, Boumerdès, Bouira, Bordj Bou Arréridj, Sétif, Mila, Constantine, Skikda, Annaba, El Taref
- Major cities: Algiers, Bouira, Sétif, Constantine, Annaba

Highway system
- Transport in Algeria

The A2 motorway, also called the East Highway (French: Autoroute de l'Est), is a toll-free controlled-access highway in Algeria. At a length of 614 kilometres (382 mi), the highway starts in Algiers and ends at the Tunisian-Algerian border at El Aioun (El Taref). The road has 3 lanes in both directions and a speed limit of 120 km/h (75 mph) with a few exceptions in dangerous areas, where it gets lowered to 100 km/h (62 mph). The motorway also forms the eastern part of the East-West Highway route.

== Intersections ==
- Algiers:
- A100 in Birtouta, W144 in Baba Ali, N8 in Bentalha (Baraki), N61 and W59 in Eucalyptus
- Sidi El Kebir Station
- Blida:
- W118 in Meftah
- Boumerdès:
- A102 in Khemis El-Khechna
- Bouira:

Lakhdaria Station

- N5 in Lakhdaria, Bouira and El Adjiba, PR Tizi-Ouzou P15 and N25 in Djebahia, N18 N18 in Bouira, A20 and W11 in Ahnif
- Bechloul Station
- Bordj Bou Arréridj:
- Hammam El Biban Station
- N5 in Hammam El Biban, El Achir and Bordj Bou Arriedj,
- Zenouna Station
- N103 in Ain Taghrout
- Sétif:
- W140 and N28 in Sétif
- N77 in El Eulma
- Mila:
- N5 in Tadjenanet
- N5 in Oued Athmania
- Milev Station
- Constantine:
- N5 in Ain Semara,
- N79 and N3 and W133 in Constantine
- Skikda:
- Bougaroun Station
- W33 W33 and P21 PR Skikda in El Harrouch, N3AB in El Ghedir
- Ruskida Station
- N44 in Ain Charchar
- Annaba:
- N21 in Aïn Berda, P23 PR Annaba and N16 in Dréan
- Hippone Station
- El Taref:
- N44 in Lac des Oiseaux and Ain El Assel N82 in El Taref
