= El Kala District =

Coordinates: 36.8956°N 8.4433°E

El Kala District دائرة القالة
- District
- Map of Algeria highlighting El Taref Province
- Country: Algeria
- Province: El Taref
- District seat: El Kala

Population (1998)
  - Total: 40,556
- Time zone: UTC+01 (CET)
- Municipalities: 4

El Kala is a district in El Taref Province, Algeria. It was named after its capital, El Kala. El Kala National Park is there.

== Municipalities ==
The district is further divided into 4 municipalities:

- El Kala
- El Aïoun
- Raml Souk
- Souarekh
