= Lake Tonga =

Lake in El Kala National Park, Algeria

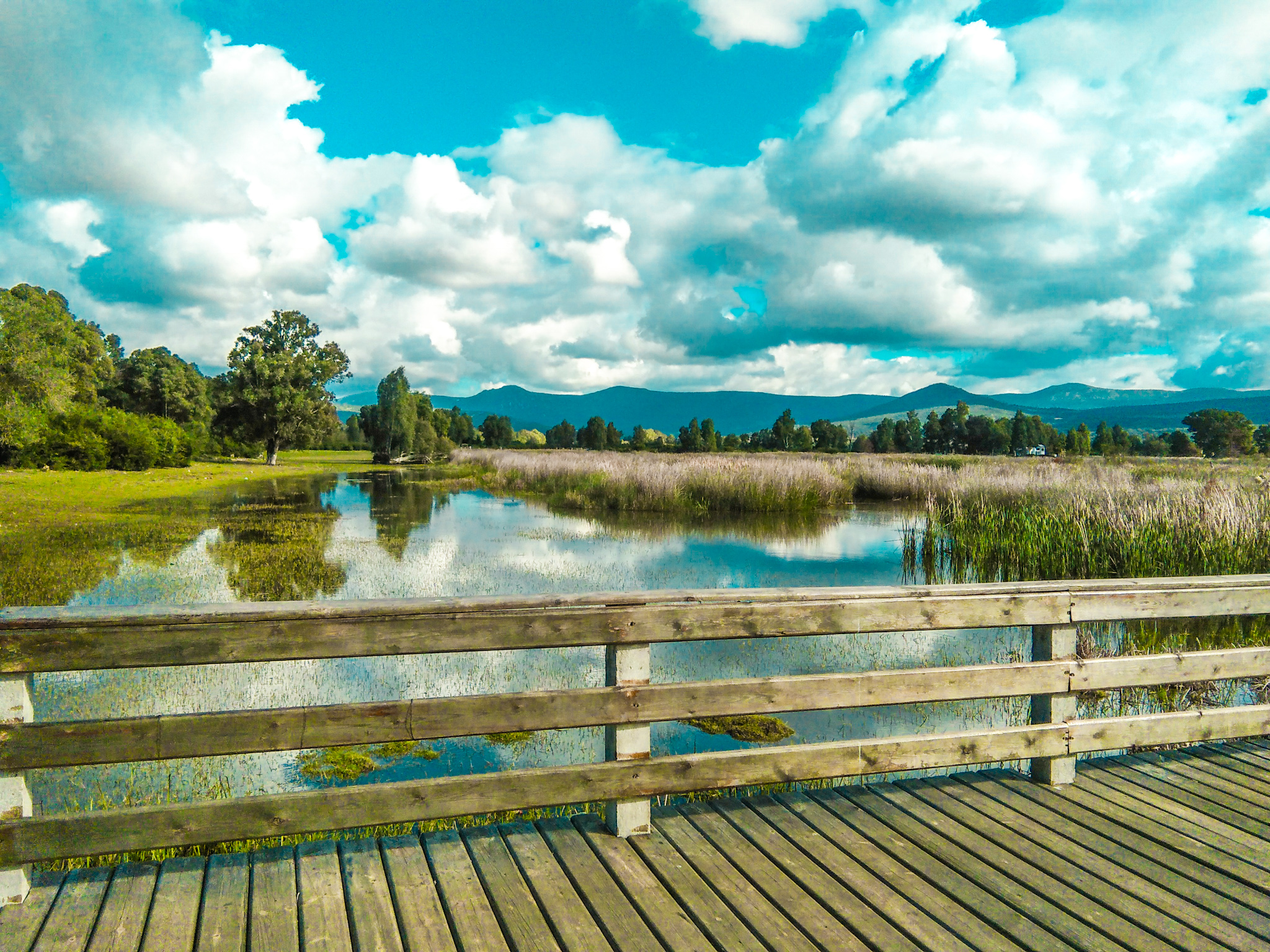
- Lake Tonga
- Interactive map of Lake Tonga
- Location: El Kala; El Taref; Algeria
- Coordinates: 36°21′37″N 8°29′52″E
- Type: Coastal marsh Lake; Swamp
- Surface area: 27 km^{2} (10 sq mi)

Lake Tonga is a freshwater lake located in El Kala National Park, in the wilaya of El Tarf, Algeria.

It was designated a Ramsar site on 11 April 1983 and is recognized as a major nesting area in North Africa.

== Location ==
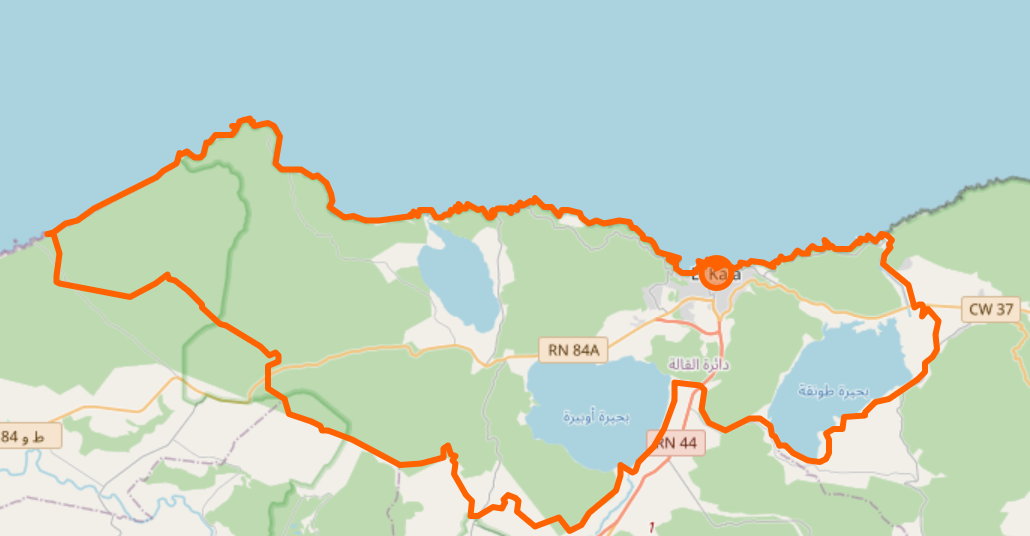
Located in the municipality of El Kala, Lake Tonga is the easternmost of the three lakes.

Lake Tonga is a freshwater lake located in the central part of El Kala National Park, alongside Lake Oubeïra, another freshwater lake, and Lake El Mellah, a salt lagoon. It occupies a large coastal depression between the town of El Kala, in northeastern Algeria, and the Algerian–Tunisian border. Its drainage basin covers approximately 15,000 hectares, including 2,800 hectares corresponding to the lake basin itself.

The three lakes were designated as wetlands of international importance under the Ramsar Convention in 1983. Lake Tonga is partially drained by a central channel excavated during the colonial period and now presents the characteristics of an extensive marsh.

The site forms a large wetland complex that also includes wooded hills, humid forest areas, and a system of sand dunes. The lake is connected to the Mediterranean Sea and is primarily fed by Oued El-Hout to the southwest and Oued El-Eurg to the northeast. These watercourses have formed deltaic systems whose sediment deposits have progressively reduced the lake’s surface area.

== Climate ==
The region has a Mediterranean climate, with an average annual temperature of 18.9 °C and a dry season lasting approximately four months. January is the coldest month, while August is the warmest. Average annual precipitation exceeds 700 mm, with rainfall concentrated mainly in autumn and winter and lower levels during the summer.

Lake Tonga

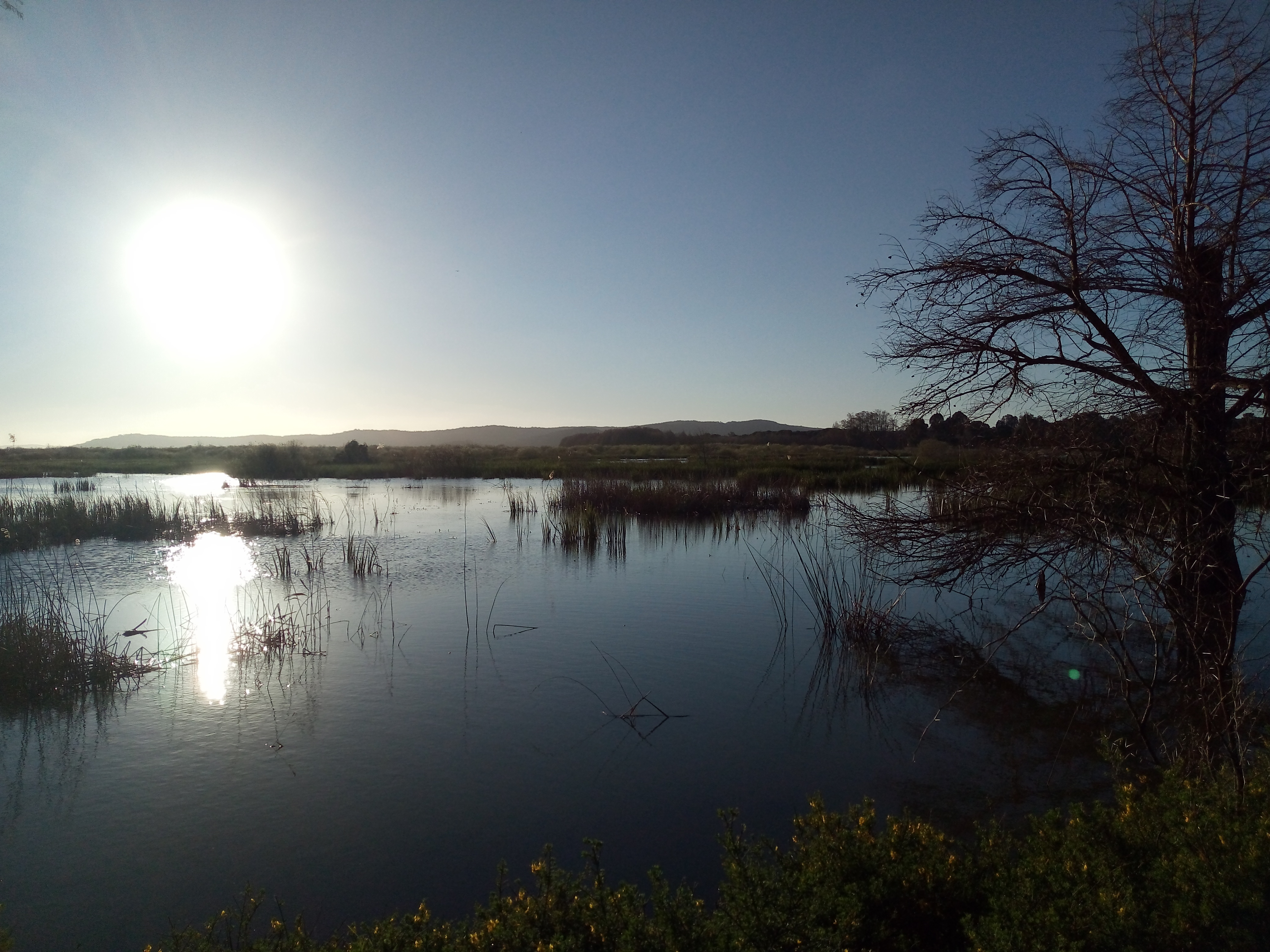

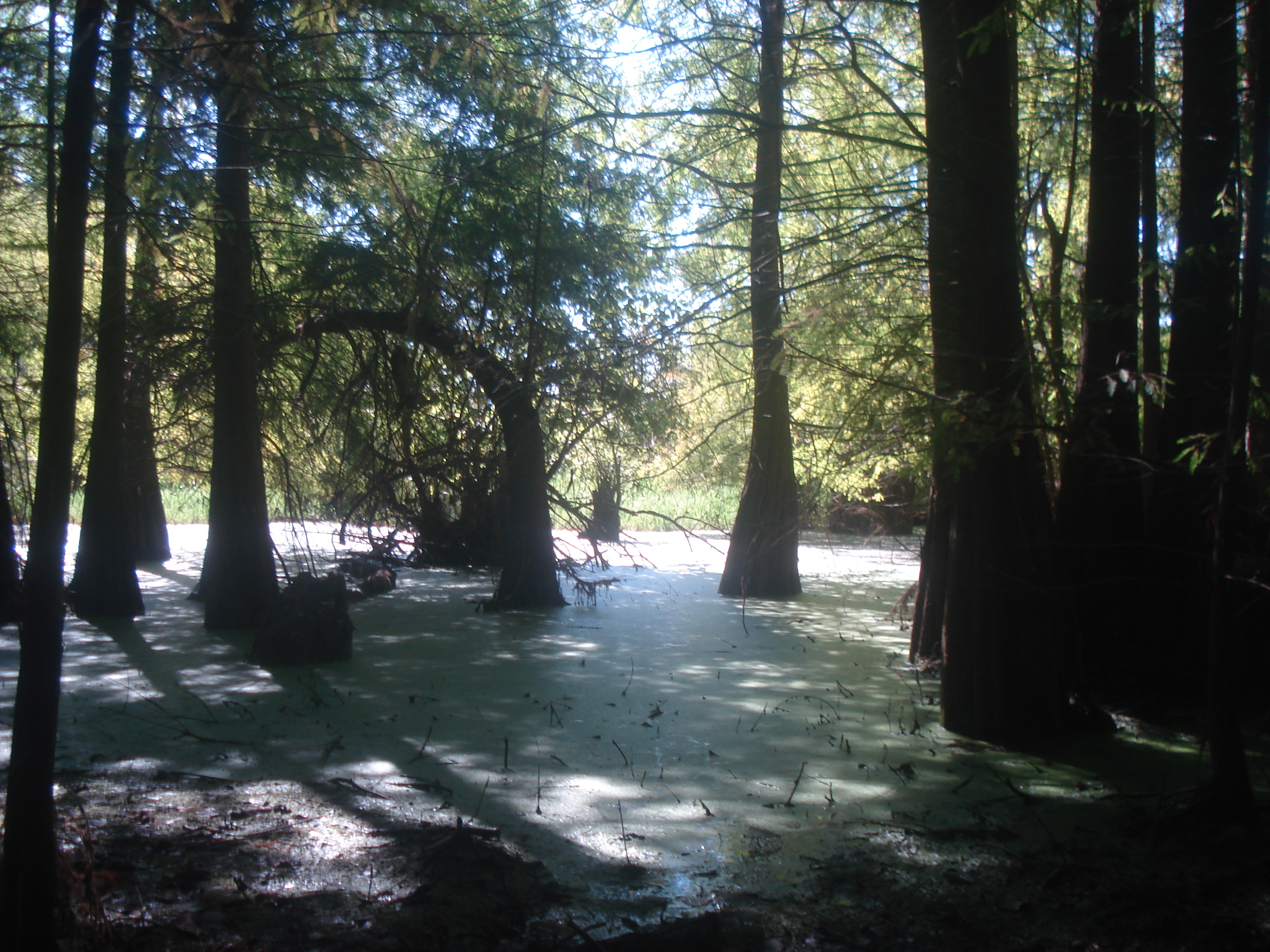

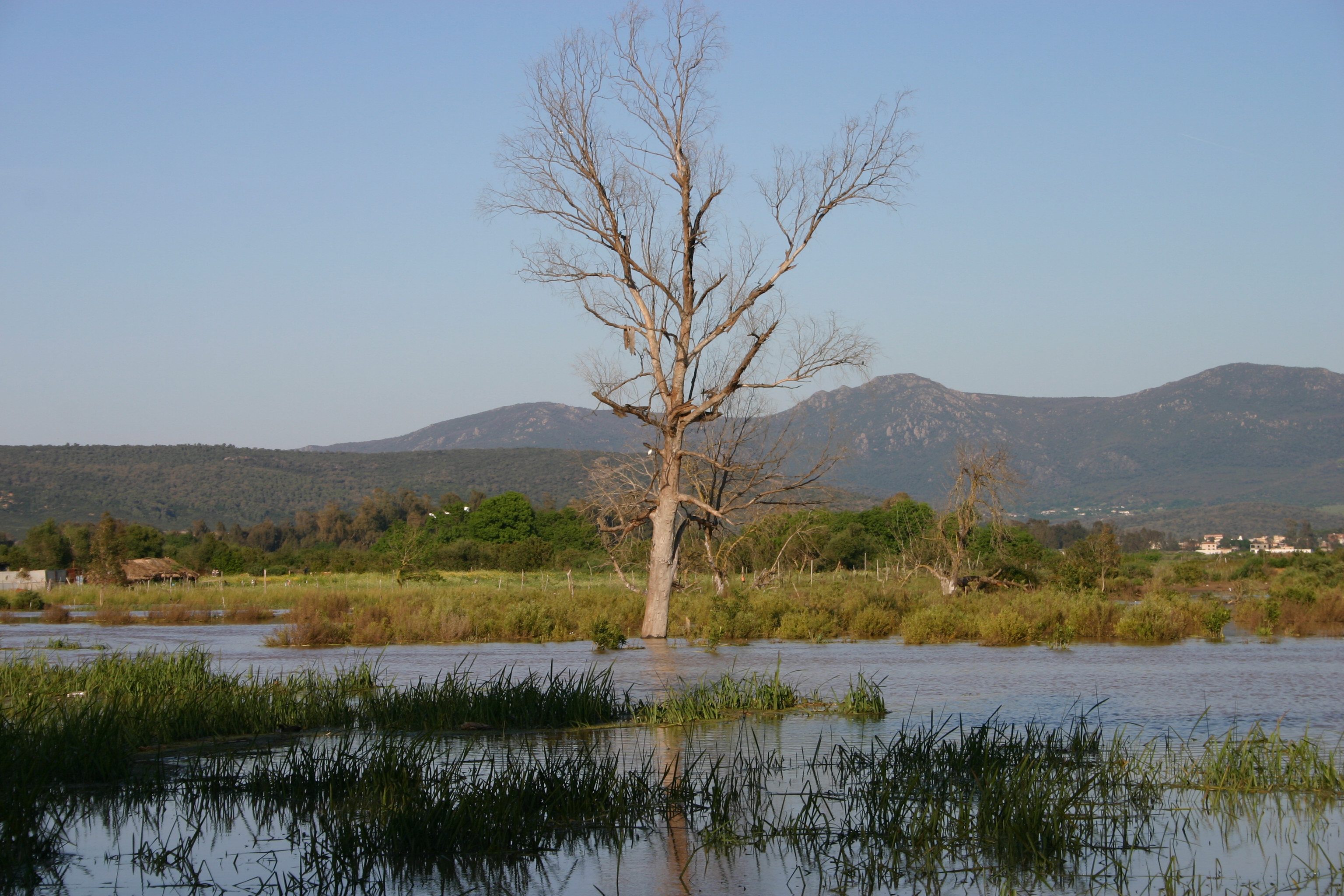

== Fauna and flora ==
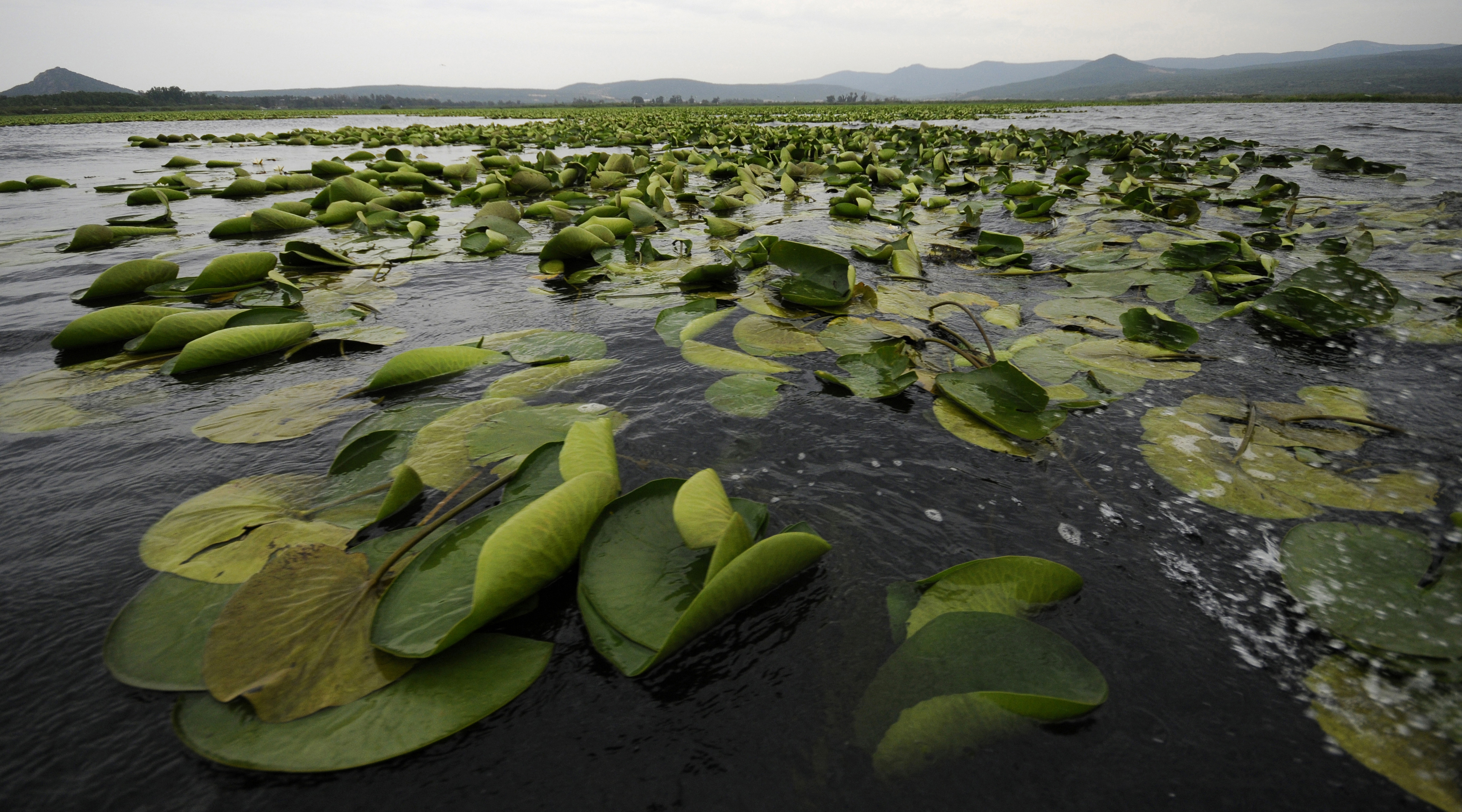
Water lily

The lake provides an important habitat for aquatic plants, with vegetation forming a mosaic of plant communities. The dominant physiognomy is a reed bed that shelters most helophytes. During spring and summer, white water lilies cover a large portion of the lake’s surface.

Lake Tonga is considered a major nesting area in North Africa, hosting numerous species of herons, egrets, western marsh harriers, other birds of prey, and various waterbirds, including some rare and globally threatened species.

Local populations engage in livestock breeding and seasonal agriculture.

== See also ==
- El Kala National Park
- Wildlife of Algeria
