= Lake Oubeïra =

Algerian lake

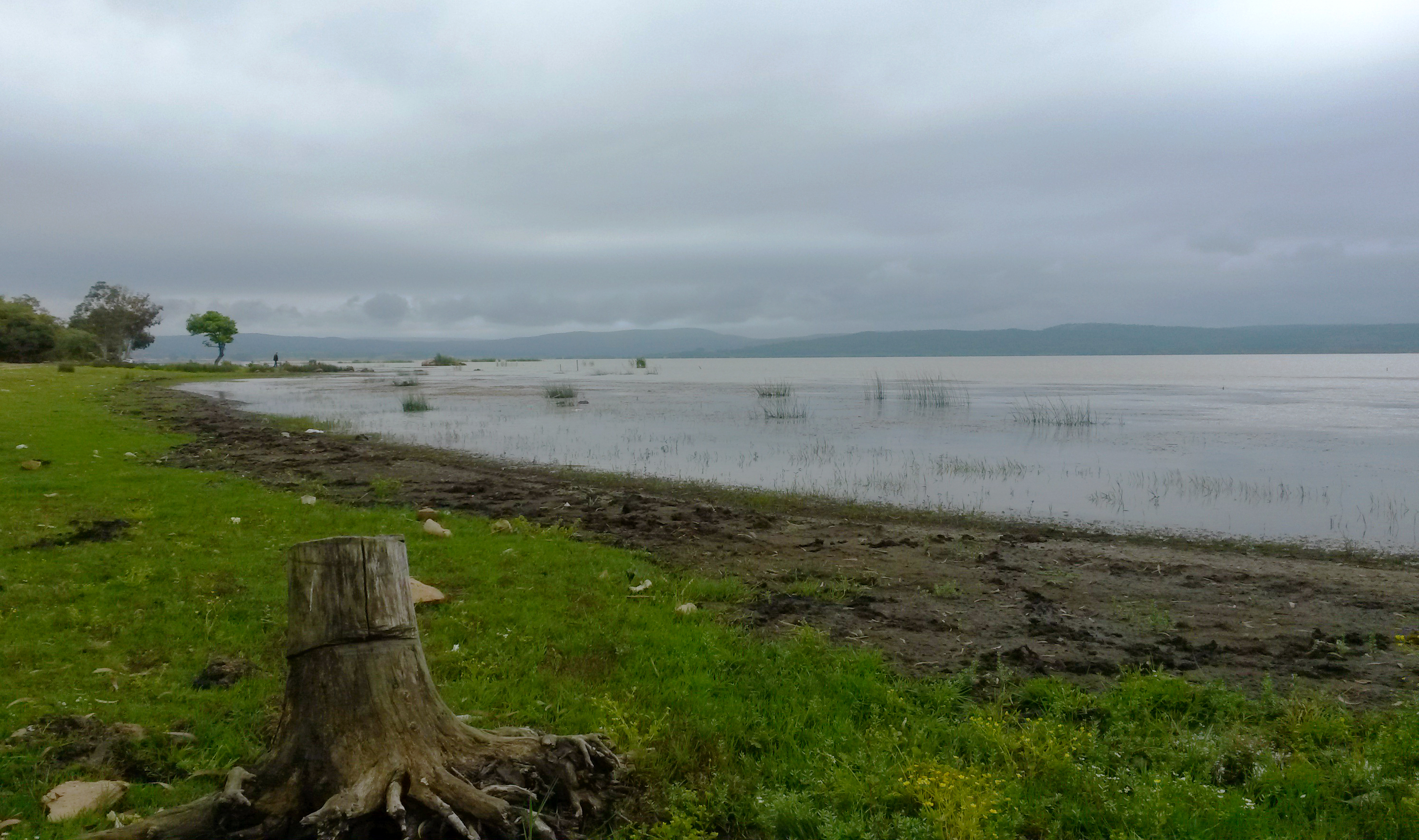
- Lake Oubeïra
- Location: El Kala, El Taref, Algeria
- Coordinates: 36°50′41″N 8°23′22″E
- Type: Lake

Location
- Interactive map of Lake Oubeïra

Lake Oubeïra is a freshwater lake situated in El-Kala National Park in El Tarf Province, Algeria. It was designated as a Ramsar site on 4 November 1983. The lake serves as a significant nesting area for bird species in North Africa.

== Location ==
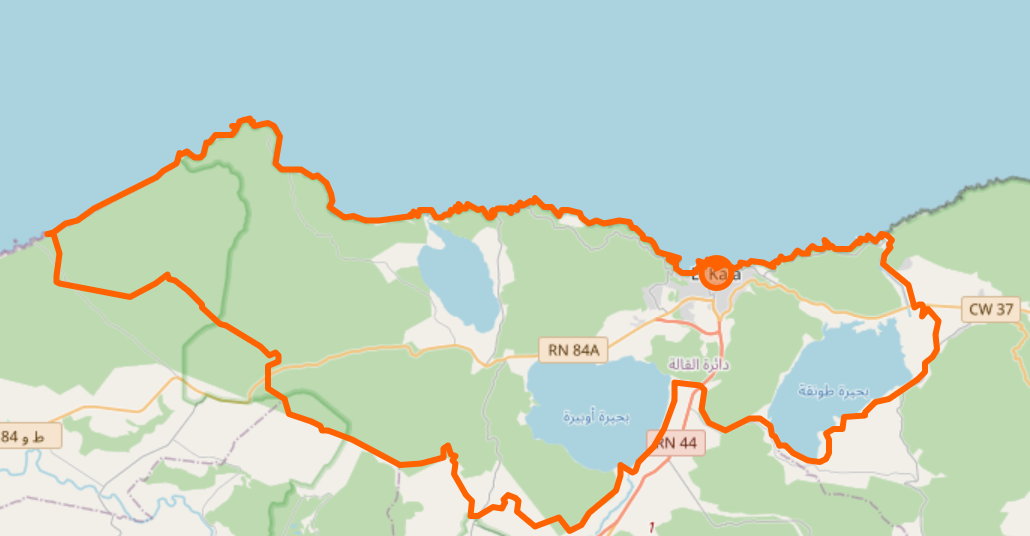
Located in the municipality of El Kala, Lake Oubeïra is the central lake of the three.

Lake Oubeïra is a freshwater lake located in the central area of El-Kala National Park in El Tarf Province, Algeria. The park also includes Lake Tonga, another freshwater body, and Lake Mellah a saline lagoon. In 1983, all three lakes were designated as wetlands of international importance under the Ramsar Convention by UNESCO.

Lake Oubeïra is an endorheic lake located between the town of El Kala, in northeastern Algeria, and the Algerian-Tunisian border, at an elevation of 23 meters. It has an approximately circular shape, a flat bottom covered with grayish silt, and spans an area of 2,000 hectares with an average depth of 1 meter. The site forms part of a large wetland complex that includes a dune system. Despite being endorheic, the lake is connected to the Mediterranean Sea.

The main watercourse associated with Lake Oubeïra is the Oued Messida, which exhibits a seasonal flow pattern: it flows from the lake to the Oued el Rebir in summer and in the opposite direction during winter. A balance between evaporation and rainfall maintains the lake’s persistence. The size of the watershed and the contribution of aquifers during the dry season help compensate for water losses and support the lake's continuity.

== Climate ==
The region has a Mediterranean climate, characterized by an average annual temperature of 18.9 °C and a four-month dry season. January is the coldest month and August is the warmest. Annual precipitation exceeds 700 mm, with rainfall concentrated in autumn and winter, and minimal precipitation during the summer months.

== Flora and fauna ==
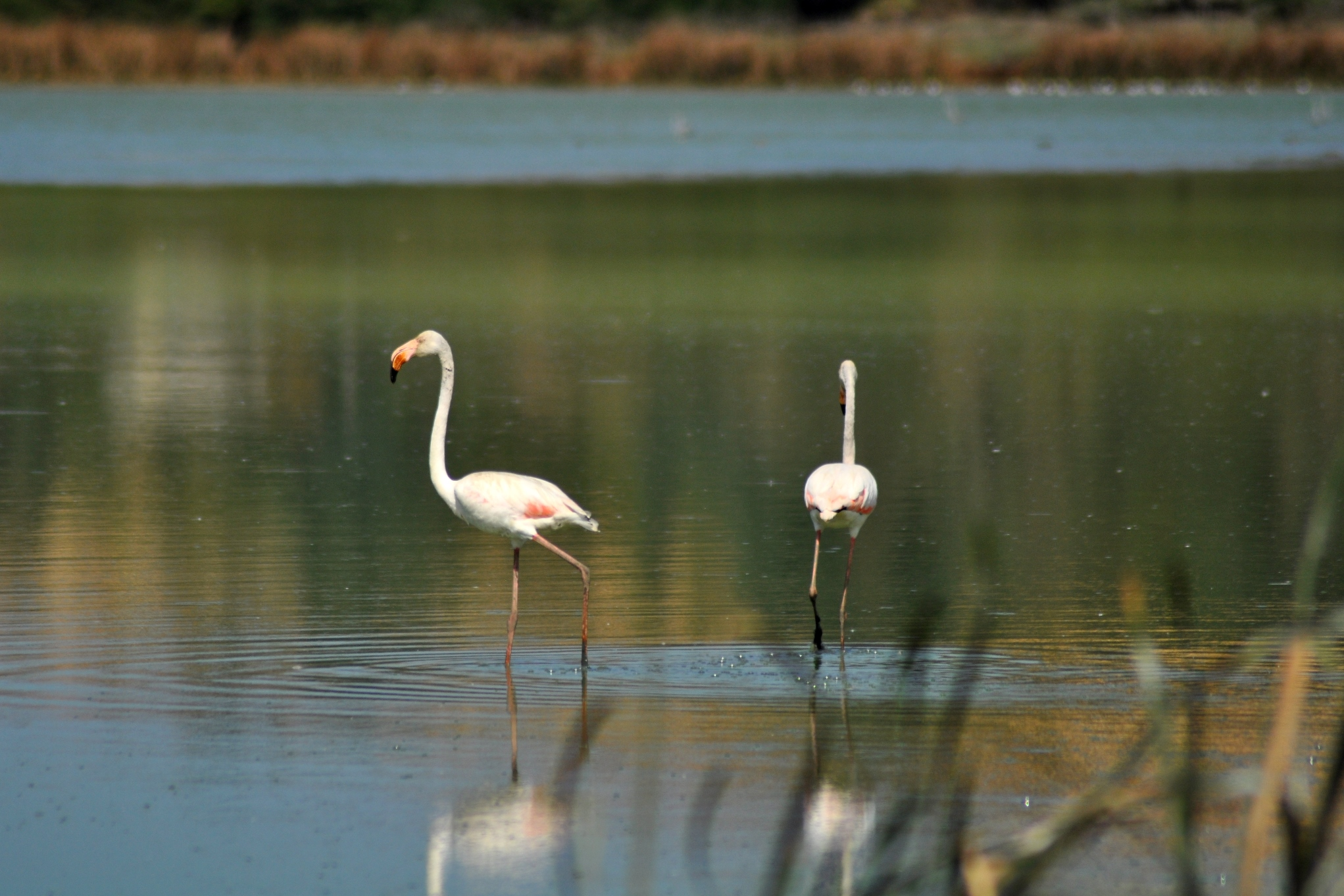
Pink flamingos in El-Kala National Park.

The lake serves as a significant habitat for aquatic vegetation, including species rare in Algeria, such as water chestnuts and yellow water lilies.

The lake supports a diverse fish population, including a significant presence of eels. Species from the Mugilidae family, such as Mugil cephalus and Liza ramada, periodically enter the lake from the sea via an overflow channel. Barbel spawn in Lake Oubeïra at the end of winter and the beginning of spring.

The lake is a habitat for a variety of nesting bird species, including resident species such as the purple swamphen and the osprey, and wintering species such as the white-headed duck, the greylag goose, and the great cormorant. Some of these species are globally threatened. The glossy ibis and the greater flamingo are present year-round. The area also supports mammalian species, including the otter.

Local populations practice livestock farming and agriculture in the surrounding area. The lake has been stocked with carp and includes an aquaculture station located on its northern shore.

== See also ==
- El Kala National Park
- Wildlife of Algeria
