= El Taref District =

Coordinates: 36.7672°N 8.3138°E

El Taref District دائرة الطارف
- District
- Map of Algeria highlighting El Taref Province
- Country: Algeria
- Province: El Taref
- District seat: El Taref

Population (1998)
  - Total: 51,787
- Time zone: UTC+01 (CET)
- Municipalities: 4

El Taref is a district in El Taref Province, Algeria. It was named after its capital, El Taref, which is also the capital of the province.

== Municipalities ==
The district is further divided into 4 municipalities:

- El Taref
- Aïn El Assel
- Bougous
- Zitouna
