= Highway A20 (Algeria) =

Road in Algeria

A20 autoroute
- The Highway of The Soummam; Penetrating Road of Béjaia

Route information
- Length: 100 km (62 mi)

Major junctions
- North end: The Port of Bejaia
- A2 and W11 in Ahnif; N5 in Ath Mansour; N74 in Takrietz; N26 in Akbou; N75 In Amizour; W21A in El Kseur; N12 in Oued Ghir
- Southwest end: Ahnif

Location
- Country: Algeria

Highway system
- Transport in Algeria

The A20 highway also called The Highway of The Soummam is a 100-kilometre-long (62 mi) road with a 2x3-lane configuration. It spans from Highway A2 to the port of Béjaïa.

It starts in the city of Ahnif in Bouïra and ends in the port of Bejaia going through the wilaya's biggest cities.

It has a speed limit of 110 km/h (68 mph) with a few exceptions; on dangerous sections, it is lowered to 80 km/h (50 mph).

The road is not yet completely delivered—there are 16 kilometres (9.9 mi) left of it expected to be completed in the end of 2024.

== Intersections ==
- 1: A2 and W11 in Ahnif
- 2: N5 in Ath Mansour
- 3: N74 in Takrietz
- 4: N26 in Akbou
- 5: N75 In Amizour and W21A in El Kseur
- 6: N12 in Oued Ghir
