= Zelizer =

Zelizer is a surname. Notable people with the surname include:

- Julian E. Zelizer (born 1969), American political historian, son of Viviana
- Viviana Zelizer (born 1946), American sociologist

== See also ==
- Zerizer
