= East–West Highway (Algeria) =

Road in Algeria

A2 A3 East–West Highway
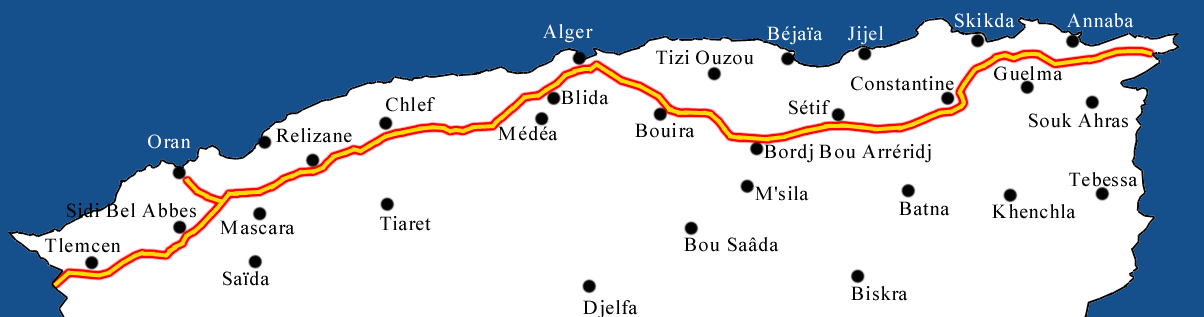

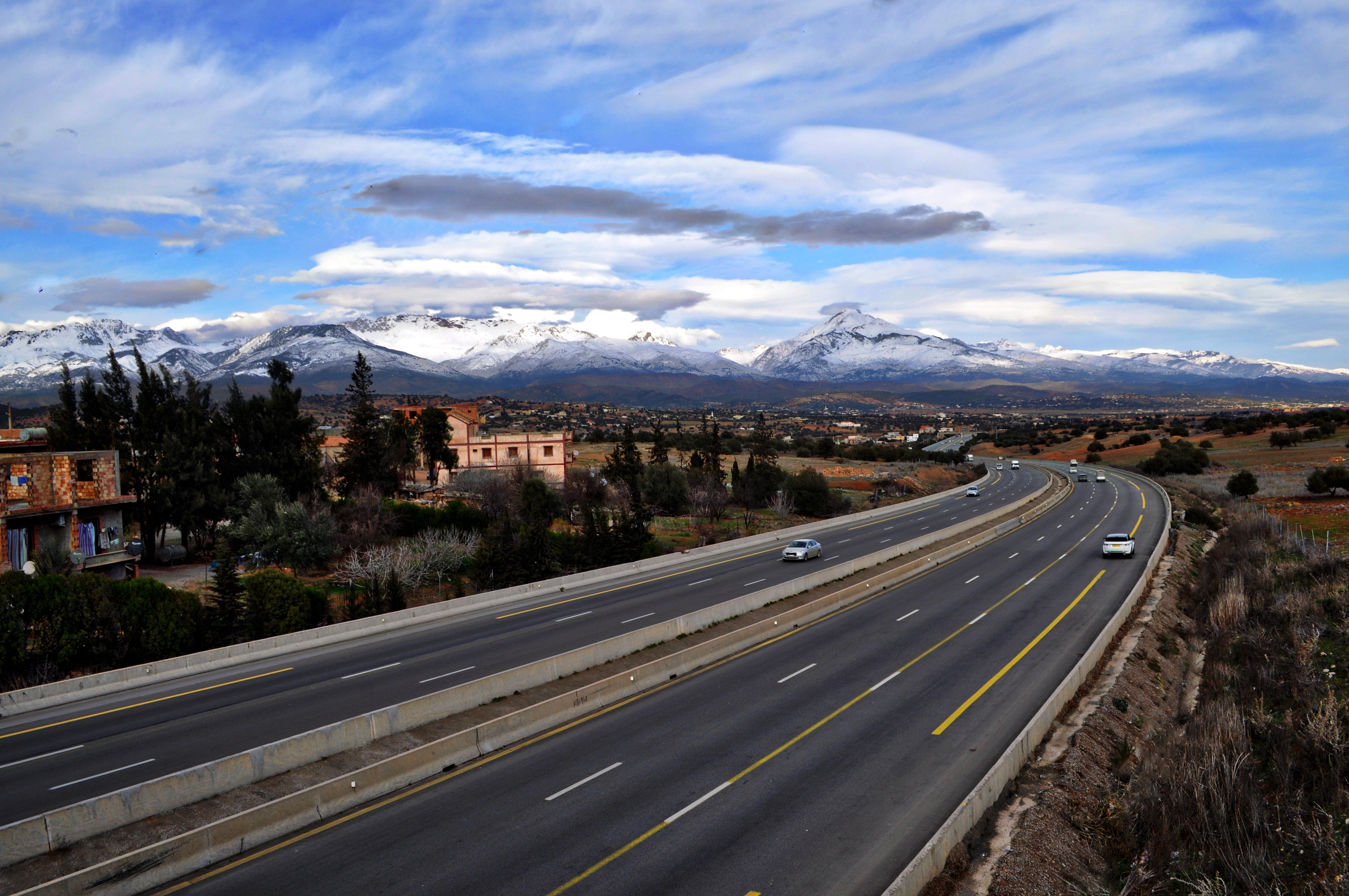

Route information
- Length: 1,216 km (756 mi)
- Existed: March 2007–present
- History: Completed as of August 2023; 2 years ago

Major junctions
- East end: Algeria-Tunisia border
- West end: Algeria-Morocco border

Location
- Country: Algeria
- Major cities: Constantine, Setif, Algiers, Blida, Oran, Tlemcen, El Taref

Highway system
- Transport in Algeria

The East-West Highway (Arabic: الطريق السيار شرق-غرب) is a motorway in Algeria. The project of a six-lane highway across Algeria was launched in 2007 and was finished in August 2023 after 17 years of construction. It is considered to be one of the largest public works projects in the world. The motorway consists of two parts: The A2 (East Highway), running from Algiers to the Tunisian border, and the A3 (West Highway), running from Blida to the Moroccan border.

The US$11 billion project was undertaken by a complex consortium of international suppliers, and there have been concerns about corruption and long delays. The Central and Western sections of the road were built by a consortium of China Railway Construction Corporation and CITIC while the Eastern section was constructed by a Japanese consortium of Kajima Corporation, Nishimatsu Construction Company, Itochu Corporation, Hazama Corporation and Taisei Corporation.

== Route ==
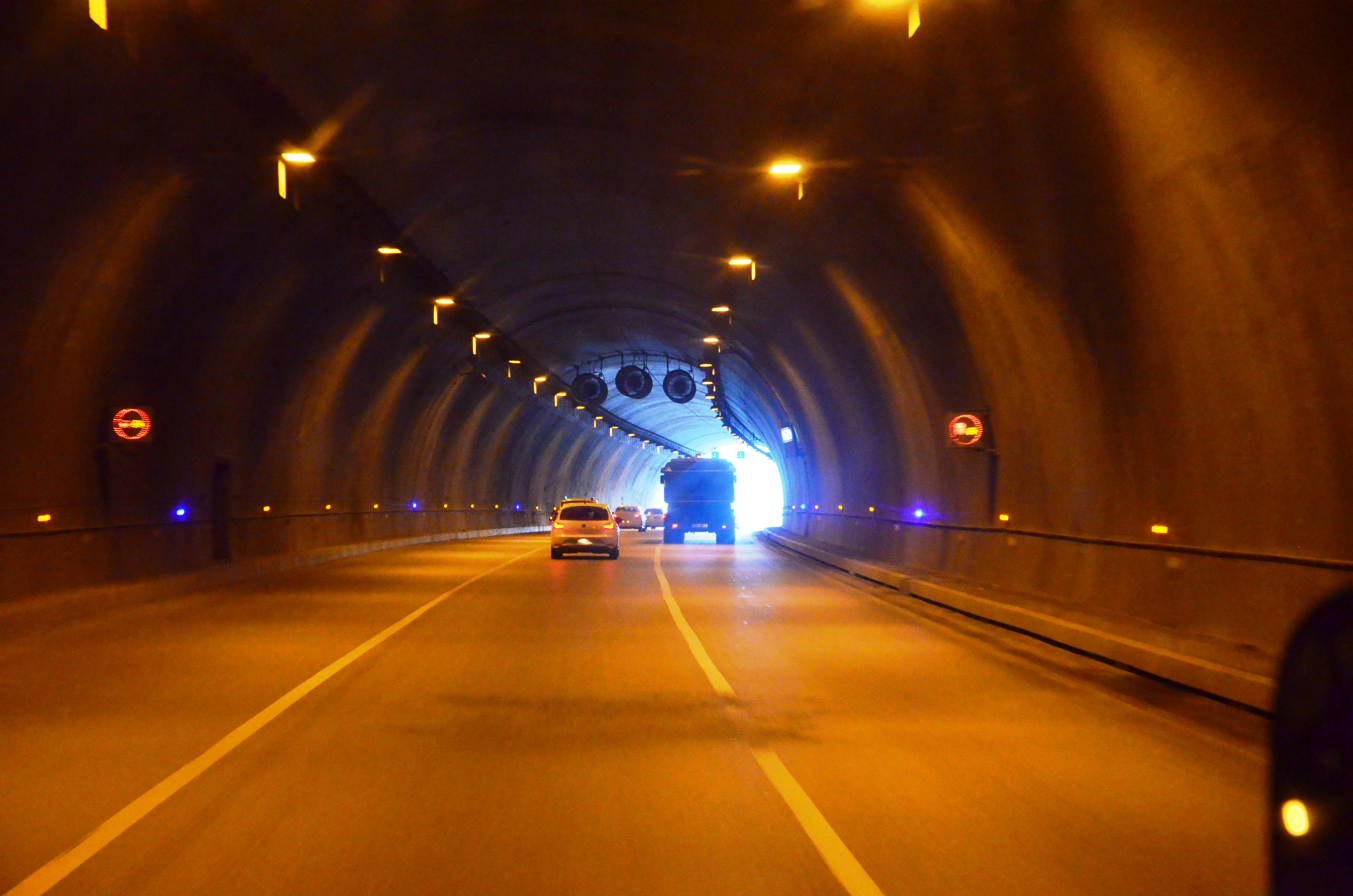
Tunnel (2015)

The highway runs through 1,216 km (756 mi) starting from the Moroccan border and ending at the Tunisian border, connecting Algeria's major coastal cities. Other hub roads are under construction as well, thus providing a link to other important cities of the inner part of the country. The east–west highway was the first stage of Algeria's five-year plan, which included spending US$40.9 billion on modernization of road networks and increasing ports' capacity.

== Origin & History ==
=== Pre-Construction Phase ===
The motorway was envisioned in the 1970s by the then planning ministry alongside other mega-projects.

Studies on the motorway began as early as 1983, analysts considered factors such as climate, topography and many socio-economic impacts on the urban centers which the motorway would pass through. Eventually, in June 1987, the project was parliamentarily approved.

==== Funding and early construction ====
In the early stages of the project, it would be funded by European, Arab and African loans.

On June 18, 1990, the EIB (European Investment Bank) granted the first loan of 40 million euros for the first section between El Affroun and Blida. A year later, in 1991, the same bank granted a 31 million euro loan for the bypass section near Bouira. Between 1993 and 1994 a total of 100 million euros were loaned for the Lakhdaria-Bouira section of the A1 highway. The same bank continued to grant loans of up to 210 million euros up until 2002 for several portions of the highway, but there were no direct connections between these sections except for the already existing RN-4.

On October 3, 1995, a 30 km section between El Affroun and Hoceinia (Ain Defla) is inaugurated. 7 years later, the Arab Fund for Economic and Social Development (FADES) granted a loan of 86 million dollars for the completion of the section, of which only 30% would be used for its implementation.

Between 1996 and 2002, the African Development Bank granted a loan of $161 million for the completion of the Constantine city bypass and the 29 km section between Ain Smara and El Meridj.

==== State funding ====
In February 2005, almost a year after his re-election, Former President Abdelaziz Bouteflika announced that the financing of all of the remaining sections from the public treasury would be provided for by the government's treasury, ignoring the advice of his finance minister.

On July 25, 2005, an executive decree is published to enforce the decision and to grant the funding necessary for the remaining sections of the motorway.

The limited international call for tenders, including precise specifications due to the sheer scale of the east–west highway project was launched on July 23, 2005 . Several responses were recorded (American, French, German and Portuguese). Ultimately, two consortia were selected: the Chinese CITIC-CRCC and the Japanese COJAAL. The results were announced on April 15, 2006, and the production contracts were signed on September 18 in the same year.

==== Project managers ====
While the highway was owned by the state, another call for tenders was released for the management of the construction itself, the winners were as following:

- the Canadian design office “Dessau Soprane” for control and monitoring over the entire project.
- the French design office “Egis-Route” for the western sector.
- the Canadian design office SNC Lavalin for the central sector.
- the Italian group "ANAS Italconsult INCO" for the eastern sector.

=== Construction (2008-2023) ===
Although the main east–west highway project started in 2006, several sections already existed. The new sections were to be delivered scattered throughout the following decade.

The western and central sections, carried out by the Chinese group CITIC-CRCC, were inaugurated and completed during the early 2010s, but the work on the eastern section would not be completed up until 2016, which carried out by the Japanese group COJAAL. Technical problems as well as Cojaal's inability to carry out this type of infrastructure would be used to explain this delay.

A corruption scandal surfaced in 2010, and alleged outside sources reported on the quality of the work carried out by CITIC-CRCC, and it was considered non-compliant with international standards as repair work and maintenance were already necessary as early as 2013.

The project was completed on August 12, 2023, becoming part of the Maghreb highway network.
