= Dréan District =

Coordinates: 36.6833°N 7.7500°E

Dréan District دائرة الدرعان
- District
- Map of Algeria highlighting El Taref Province
- Country: Algeria
- Province: El Taref
- District seat: Dréan

Population (1998)
  - Total: 62,213
- Time zone: UTC+01 (CET)
- Municipalities: 3

Dréan is a district in El Taref Province, Algeria. It was named after its capital, Dréan. French author and philosopher Albert Camus was born there.

== Municipalities ==
The district is further divided into 3 municipalities:

- Dréan
- Chihani
- Chebaita Mokhtar
