= Wildlife of Algeria =

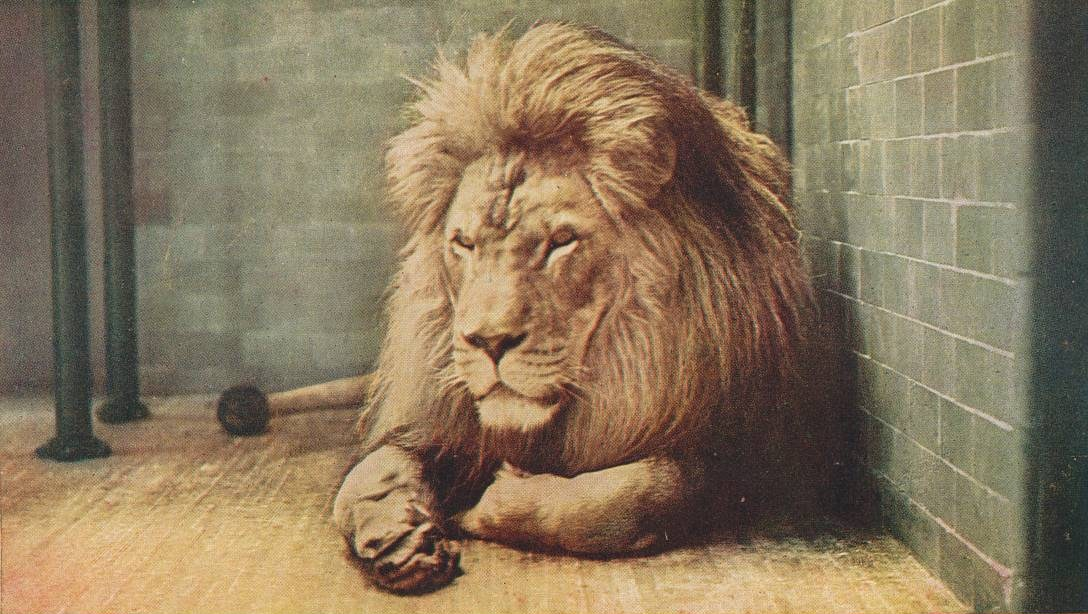
The Barbary lion possibly survived in Algeria until the early 1960s.

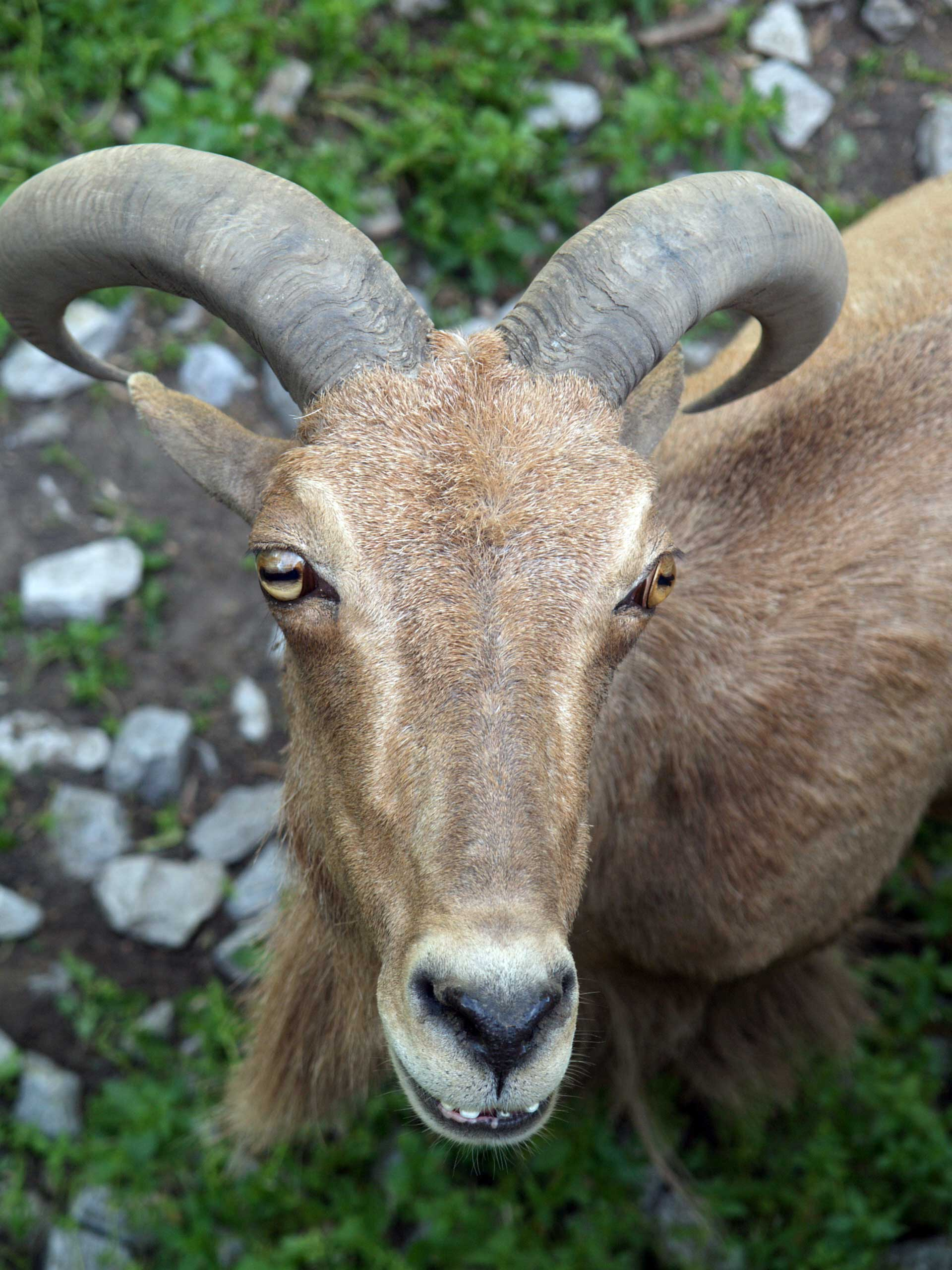
Barbary sheep

The wildlife of Algeria is composed of its flora and fauna. Mountains, chotts, wetlands, and grassy desert-like regions all support a wide range of wildlife. The most commonly seen animals include the wild boars, jackals, and gazelles, although it is not uncommon to spot fennecs and jerboas. Leopards and cheetahs are seldom seen.

A variety of bird species make the country an attraction for bird watchers. Barbary macaques are the sole native monkey.

== Flora ==
In the north, the native flora includes the Algerian oak, Atlas cedar, and other conifers. The grape vine is indigenous to the coast. In the Sahara region, some oases have date palms. Acacia with wild olives are the predominant flora in the remainder of the Sahara.

In the south, the critically endangered Saharan cypress is endemic in Algeria.

In Algeria forest cover is around 1% of the total land area, equivalent to 1,949,000 ha (7,530 mi^{2}) of forest in 2020, up from 1,667,000 ha (6,440 mi^{2}) in 1990. In 2020, naturally regenerating forest covered 1,439,000 ha (5,560 mi^{2}) and planted forest covered 510,000 ha (2,000 mi^{2}). Of the naturally regenerating forest 0% was reported to be primary forest (consisting of native tree species with no clearly visible indications of human activity) and around 6% of the forest area was found within protected areas. For the year 2015, 80% of the forest area was reported to be under public ownership, 18% private ownership and 2% with ownership listed as other or unknown.

== Fauna ==
=== Mammals ===
There are 104 mammal species in Algeria, of which three are critically endangered, two are endangered, ten are vulnerable, and three are near-threatened. One of the species listed for Algeria is extinct, and one does no longer occur in the wild.

=== Birds ===
- Egyptian vulture
- Golden eagle
- Bonelli's eagle
- Griffon vulture
- Great crested grebe
- Little grebe
- European turtle dove
- Shearwaters
- Black stork
- White stork
- Petrels
- Storm-petrels
- Pelicans
- Cormorant
- Bitterns
- Herons
- Egrets
- Storks
- Ibises
- Spoonbills
- Flamingos
- Ducks
- Geese
- Swans
- Osprey
- Hawks
- Kites
- Eagles
- Falcon
- Pheasant
- Partridge
- Crane
- Rails
- Crakes
- Coots
- Arabian bustard
- Oystercatchers
- Avocet
- Stilt
- Thick-knee
- Pratincole
- Courser
- Plover
- Lapwing
- Sandpiper
- Gulls
- Terns
- Sandgrouse
- Pigeons
- Doves
- Cuckoos
- Great spotted woodpecker
- Eurasian wryneck
- Barn owls
- Typical owls
- Nightjars
- Swifts
- Kingfishers
- Bee-eaters
- Starling

=== Reptiles ===
- Algerian sand racer
- Bedriaga's fringe-fingered lizard
- Boomslang
- Desert monitor
- Egyptian cobra
- Egyptian sand boa
- Erycinae
- European pond terrapin
- False smooth snake
- Greek tortoise
- Horned desert viper
- Iberian wall lizard
- Lataste's viper
- Leatherback turtle (in the Mediterranean Sea)
- Loggerhead sea turtle (in the Mediterranean Sea)
- Mediterranean chameleon
- Mediterranean house gecko
- Moorish gecko
- Müller's sand boa
- Red-tailed spiny-footed lizard
- Sahara sand viper
- Saharan spiny-tailed lizard
- Saw-scaled viper
- Small-spotted lizard
- Small three-toed skink
- Southern smooth snake
- Two-fingered skink
- Viperine water snake

=== Amphibians ===
- Brongersma's toad
- Common toad
- European green toad
- Mediterranean tree frog
- Perez's frog
- Sahara frog
- Algerian ribbed newt
- Edough ribbed newt
- North African fire salamander

=== Fish ===
- Atlantic bluefin tuna
- Atlantic blue marlin
- Atlantic white marlin
- European eel
- Angular roughshark
- Basking shark
- Bignose shark
- Blacktip shark
- Blacktip reef shark
- Bluntnose sixgill shark
- Bramble shark
- Dusky shark
- Great hammerhead
- Great white shark
- Grey nurse shark
- Gulper shark
- Kitefin shark
- Porbeagle
- Sandbar shark
- Scalloped hammerhead
- Sharpnose sevengill shark
- Shortfin mako
- Spinner shark
- Velvet belly lantern shark

=== Insects ===
- Acilius duvergeri
- Calopteryx exul
- Chalepoxenus brunneus
- Desert locust
- Epimyrma africana
- Epimyrma algeriana
- Honey bee
- Monomorium noualhieri
- Onychogomphus costae
- Pharaoh ant
- Red locust
- Strongylognathus afer
- Strongylognathus foreli

=== Other invertebrates ===
- Brine shrimp
- Common octopus
- Fat-tailed scorpion

== See also ==
- Algeria
- Réghaïa forest
- Lake Oubeïra
- Lake Tonga
