= Dréan =

Town in Algeria

Coordinates: 36°41′N 7°45′E

Former coat of arms of Mondovi (French Algeria period)

Dréan (Arabic: الذرعان ad-Draʿān) is a small coastal town in Algeria, 25 km south of Annaba, in El Taref Province. According to the 2008 census It has a population of 37,686. It was founded by French settlers under the name Mondovi (after the 1796 Battle of Mondovì) in 1848 and remained as Mondovi until 1962, when Algeria declared its independence and most of the French residents of the town chose to leave. The author Albert Camus was born in Mondovi (Dréan) in 1913, during the French rule in Algeria. It is the capital of Dréan District.
