= Oued Zitoun =

Oued Zitoun وادى الزيتون
- Commune and town
- Interactive map of Oued Zitoun
- Coordinates: 36°27′58″N 8°03′27″W
- Country: Algeria
- Province: El Taref Province

Population (1998)
  - Total: 5,321
  - Density: 230/sq mi (88/km^{2})
- Time zone: UTC+1 (CET)
- Postal code: 36310

Oued Zitoun is a town and commune in El Taref Province, Algeria. According to the 1998 census it has a population of 5,321.

== See also ==
- Oued Zitoun (Tunisia)
