= Ahnif Railway Station =

Railway station in Bouïra, Algeria

Ahnif railway station محطة قطار الحانيف

General information
- Location: Algeria
- Coordinates: 36°20′09″N 4°15′50″E
- Operator: SNTF

Services
Regional Trains
Location
- Location within Algeria

The Ahnif Railway Station is an Algerian train station located within the territory of the town of Ahnif, in the province of Bouïra.

== Railway situation ==
The station is located in the center of the town of Ahnif, on the Algiers-Skikda line. It is preceded by El Adjiba station and followed by Ath Mansour railway station.

== Service ==
Ahnif station is served by regional trains on the following routes:

- Algiers - Sétif
- Algiers - Béjaïa

== See also ==
- List of Railway stations in Algeria
