= Hammam Béni Salah =

Coordinates: 36°31′11″N 8°02′03″E

- Commune and town
- Interactive map of Hammam Béni Salah
- Country: Algeria
- Province: El Taref Province

Population (1998)
  - Total: 4,871
- Time zone: UTC+1 (CET)

Hammam Béni Salah is a town and commune in El Taref Province, Algeria. According to the 1998 census it has a population of 4,871.
