= Berrihane =

Coordinates: 36°50′14″N 8°07′26″E

- Commune and town
- Interactive map of Berrihane
- Country: Algeria
- Province: El Taref Province

Population (1998)
  - Total: 8,326
- Time zone: UTC+1 (CET)

Berrihane is a town and commune in El Taref Province, Algeria. According to the 1998 census it has a population of 8,326.
