= Bouteldja =

Coordinates: 36°47′N 8°12′E

- Commune and town
- Interactive map of Bouteldja
- Country: Algeria
- Province: El Taref Province

Population (1998)
  - Total: 15,275
- Time zone: UTC+1 (CET)

Bouteldja is a town and commune in El Taref Province, Algeria. According to the 1998 census it has a population of 15,275.

Chadli Bendjedid, third president of Algeria was born in this town.
