= Bouhadjar =

Coordinates: 36°30′11″N 8°06′19″E

- Commune and town
- Interactive map of Bouhadjar
- Country: Algeria
- Province: El Taref Province

Population (1998)
  - Total: 16,385
- Time zone: UTC+1 (CET)

Bouhadjar is a town and commune in El Taref Province, Algeria. According to the 1998 census it has a population of 16,385.
