= Echatt =

- Commune and town
- Location in Algeria
- Coordinates: 36.830°N 7.872°E
- Country: Algeria
- Province: El Taref Province
- Time zone: UTC+1 (CET)

Echatt is a town and commune in El Taref Province, Algeria.
