= Ben M'Hidi District =

Coordinates: 36.7720°N 7.9054°E

Ben M'Hidi is a district and a town with 23,000 inhabitants on the Mediterranean Sea, in El Taref Province, west of Annaba, Algeria.

== Municipalities ==
The district is further divided into 3 municipalities:
