= Besbes =

Coordinates: 36.708°N 7.843°E

Besbes (Arabic: بسباس) is a city in Algeria.

It was founded by the French in the early 19th century 1868 as a colonial district "Commune". It was given the name of Randon after the French Army general Jacques Louis Randon, but the local population used to call the area "Besbes" which was given to the city as a formal name after Algeria's independence in 1962. Besbes is located in the west of El Tarf Province, 24 km to the south of Annaba. The city is surrounded by agricultural land of the Annaba plain. During the French rule, the new village was inhabited by rich Pied-Noir families who own most of the surrounding farms.

Well before the arrival of the French, there were four big families including the Nacer, Dorbani, Doukani and Djemil families. These families are recognised as the bed rock of what Besbes is today.

The population of the settlement of Besbes based on the Algerian Census of 2008 is given as 14,157. The commune of Besbes, which includes the urban settlements of Besbes and Daghoussa had a population of 46,341.
