= Ben Mehdi =

Coordinates: 36°46′19″N 7°54′19″E

- Commune and town
- Interactive map of Ben Mehdi
- Country: Algeria
- Province: El Taref Province
- Time zone: UTC+1 (CET)

Ben Mehdi is a town and commune in El Taref Province, Algeria. It has a population of 21,000.
