= Asfour =

- Commune and town
- Location within Algeria
- Coordinates: 36°40′N 7°59′E
- Country: Algeria
- Province: El Taref Province

Population (1998)
  - Total: 10,632
- Time zone: UTC+1 (CET)

Asfour is a town and commune in El Taref Province, Algeria. According to the 1998 census it has a population of 10,632.
