= El Taref =

El Taref الطارف
- City
- Location of El Taref in the El Taref Province

- Location of El Taref in the Algeria
- Coordinates: 36.767°N 8.317°E
- Country: Algeria
- Province: El Taref Province
- District: El Taref District
- APC: 2012-2017

Government
  - Type: Municipality

Area
  - Land: 43.0 sq mi (111.4 km^{2})

Population (2008)
  - Total: 25,594
- Time zone: UTC+1 (CET)
- ISO 3166 code: CP
- Climate: Csa

El Taref (Arabic: الطارف) is a city in Algeria. It is the capital of El Taref Province. El Kala is a port town near El Taref. El Taref is 700 kilometers east of Algiers. In 1998, it had a population of around 20,300.

General Electric and Iberdrola are building a power station in El Taref, beginning in mid-2008, a project which will increase Algeria's energy capacity by 18%.
