= Chihani =

Coordinates: 36°38′49″N 7°46′32″E

- Commune and town
- Interactive map of Chihani
- Country: Algeria
- Province: El Taref Province

Population (1998)
  - Total: 9,234
- Time zone: UTC+1 (CET)

Chihani is a town and commune in El Taref Province, Algeria. According to the 1998 census it has a population of 9,234.
