= El Kala National Park =

National park in northeast Algeria

- IUCN category II (national park)
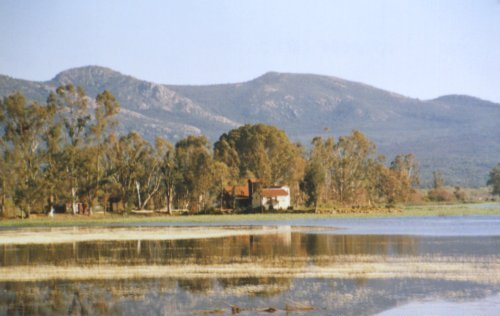

- Location within Algeria
- Interactive map of El Kala National Park
- Location: El Tarf Province, Algeria
- Nearest city: El Kala
- Coordinates: 36°49′N 8°25′E
- Area: 764 km^{2} (295 sq mi)
- Established: 1993
- Visitors: 30,000 (in 2001)

Ramsar Wetland
- Official name: Réserve Intégrale du Lac Oubeïra
- Designated: 11 April 1983
- Reference no.: 280

Ramsar Wetland
- Official name: Réserve Intégrale du Lac Tonga
- Designated: 11 April 1983
- Reference no.: 281

Ramsar Wetland
- Official name: Tourbière du Lac Noir
- Designated: 4 June 2003
- Reference no.: 1305

Ramsar Wetland
- Official name: Réserve Intégrale du Lac El Mellah
- Designated: 12 December 2004
- Reference no.: 1424

Ramsar Wetland
- Official name: Marais de Bourdim
- Designated: 18 December 2009
- Reference no.: 1895

The El Kala National Park and Biosphere Reserve (Arabic: محمية القالة الوطنية) is one of the national parks of Algeria in the extreme north-east of the country. It is home to several lakes and a unique ecosystem in the Mediterranean basin. Several parts of the park have been designated as protected Ramsar sites.

== History ==
The El Kala National Park and Biosphere Reserve was created by decree n° 83-462 of July 23, 1983, and recognized as a biosphere reserve by the UNESCO on 17 December 1990.

From 1994 to 1999, the World Bank financed a project to develop a natural resources management model for the park.

== Geography ==
The park's highest hill is djebel El-Ghorra at 1202 m. The average temperature goes from 9 °C to 30 °C. The park has 50 km of shores facing the Mediterranean Sea.

The park has 6 lakes:

- Lake Oubeira (2200 ha)
- Lake Tonga (2600 ha)
- Lake Mellah (860 ha), the only lagoon in Algeria which communicates with the sea
- Marais of Bourdim (11 ha)
- Blue lake (3 ha)
- Black lake (6 ha)

== Biosphere ==
The El Kala National Park and Biosphere Reserve is home to 40 species of mammals, 25 bird of prey species, 64 freshwater bird species and 9 marine bird species. The Barbary stag is prevalent in the park.

An investigation led between 1996 and 2010 listed 1590 different types of vegetables in the park and 718 animal species. The main tree species are the Quercus suber (dominant), the Zeen oak, the Quercus coccifera, the Aleppo pine, the glutinous Alder, Willows, the White Poplar. Other tree species in the park include Eucalyptus, Acacias, Maritime pines and bald cypresses. 175 species of mushrooms were listed.

The park is threatened by the creation of a highway in Algeria which would threaten the rare animals and plants of the park. It has been proposed that the highway should avoid this region and go further south.

== Gallery ==
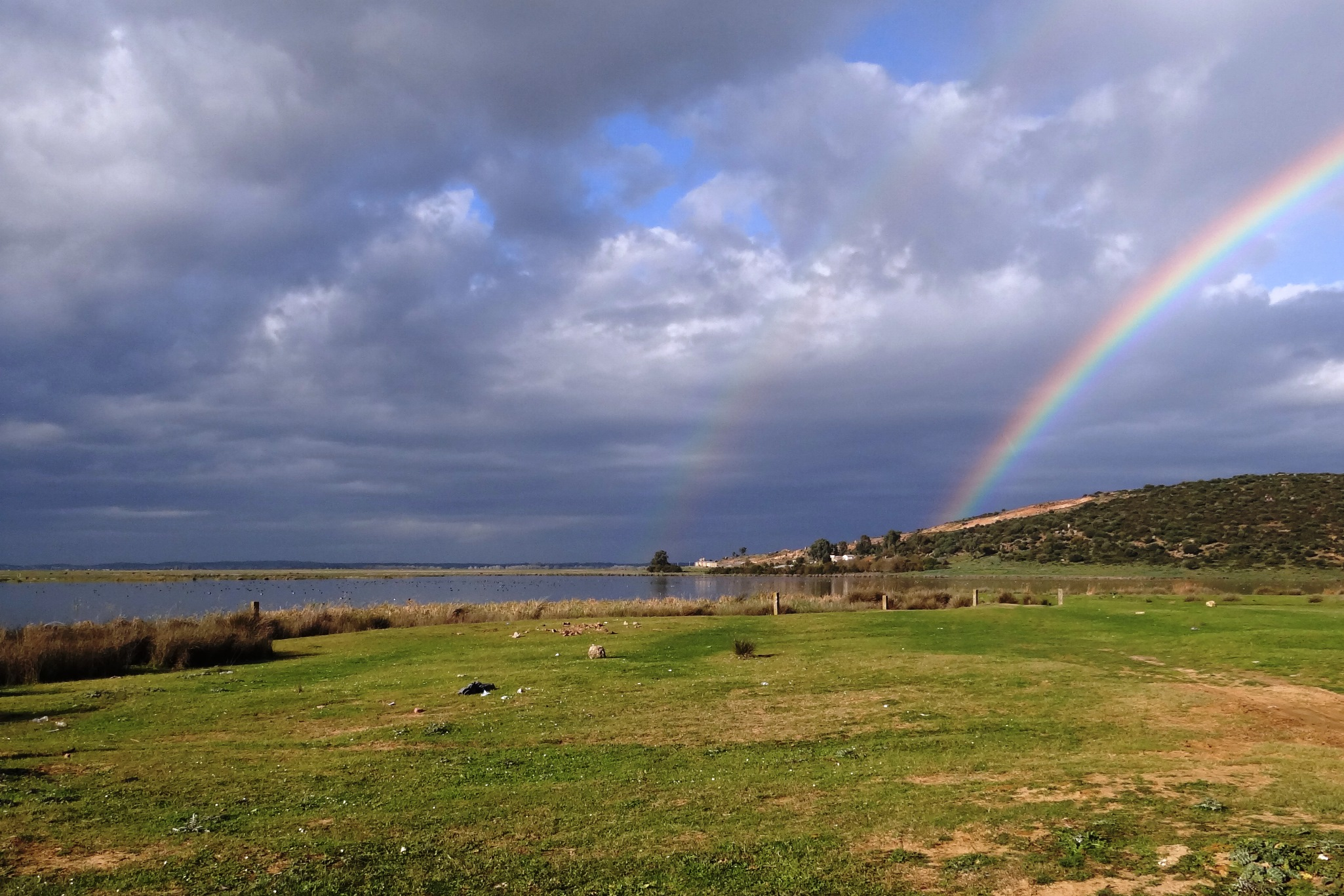
Rainbow in the park

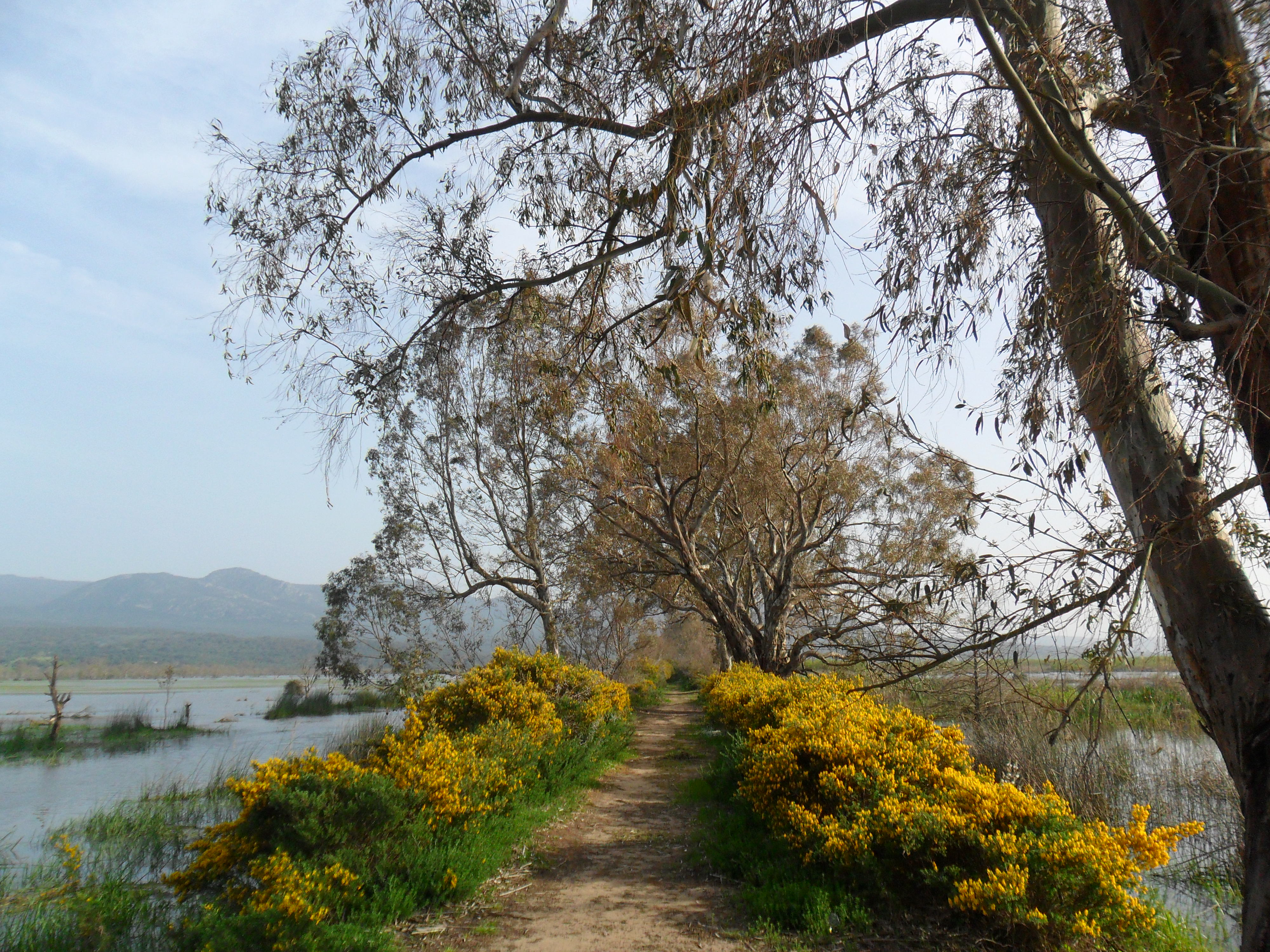
Walkway through the lake

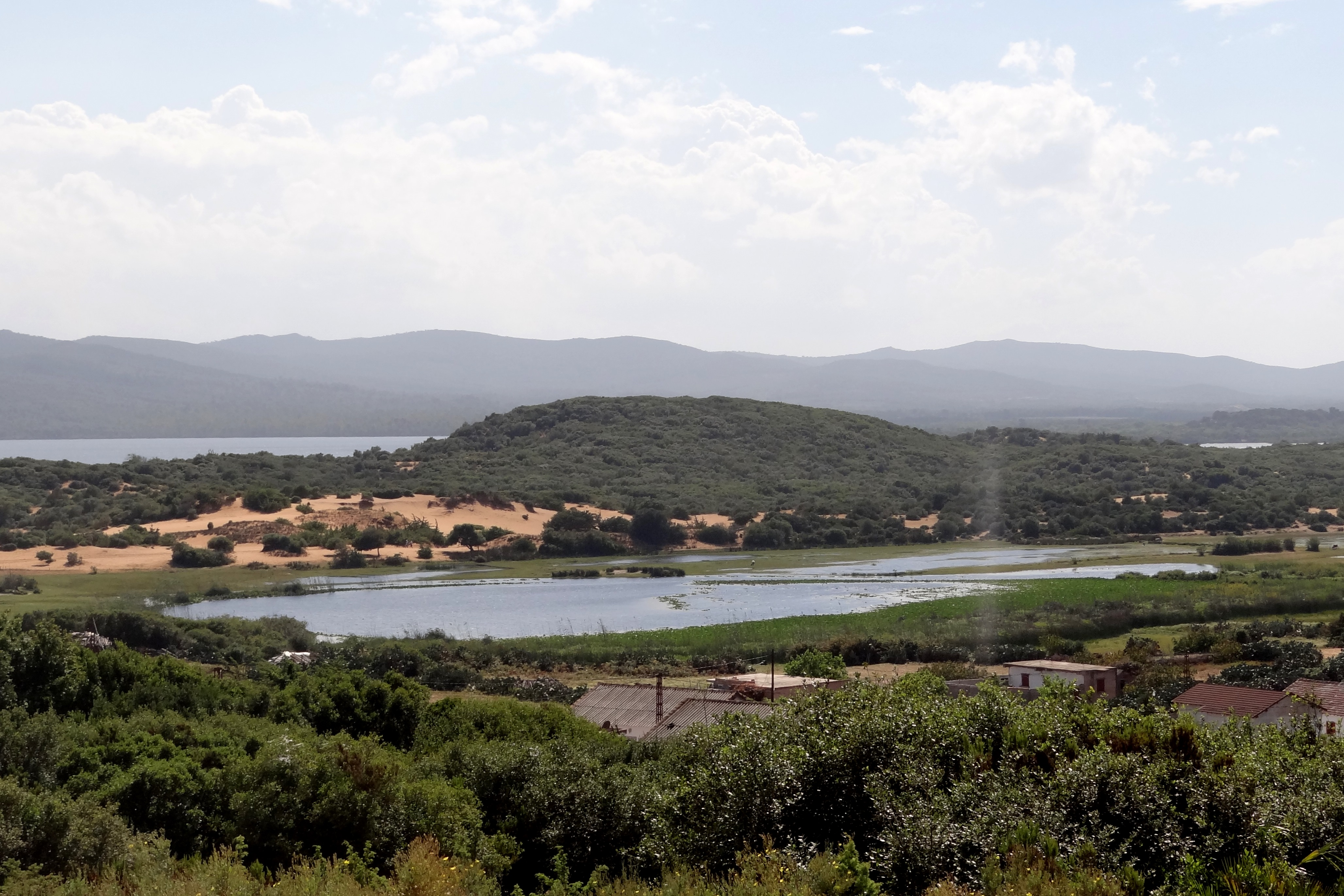
Blue Lake

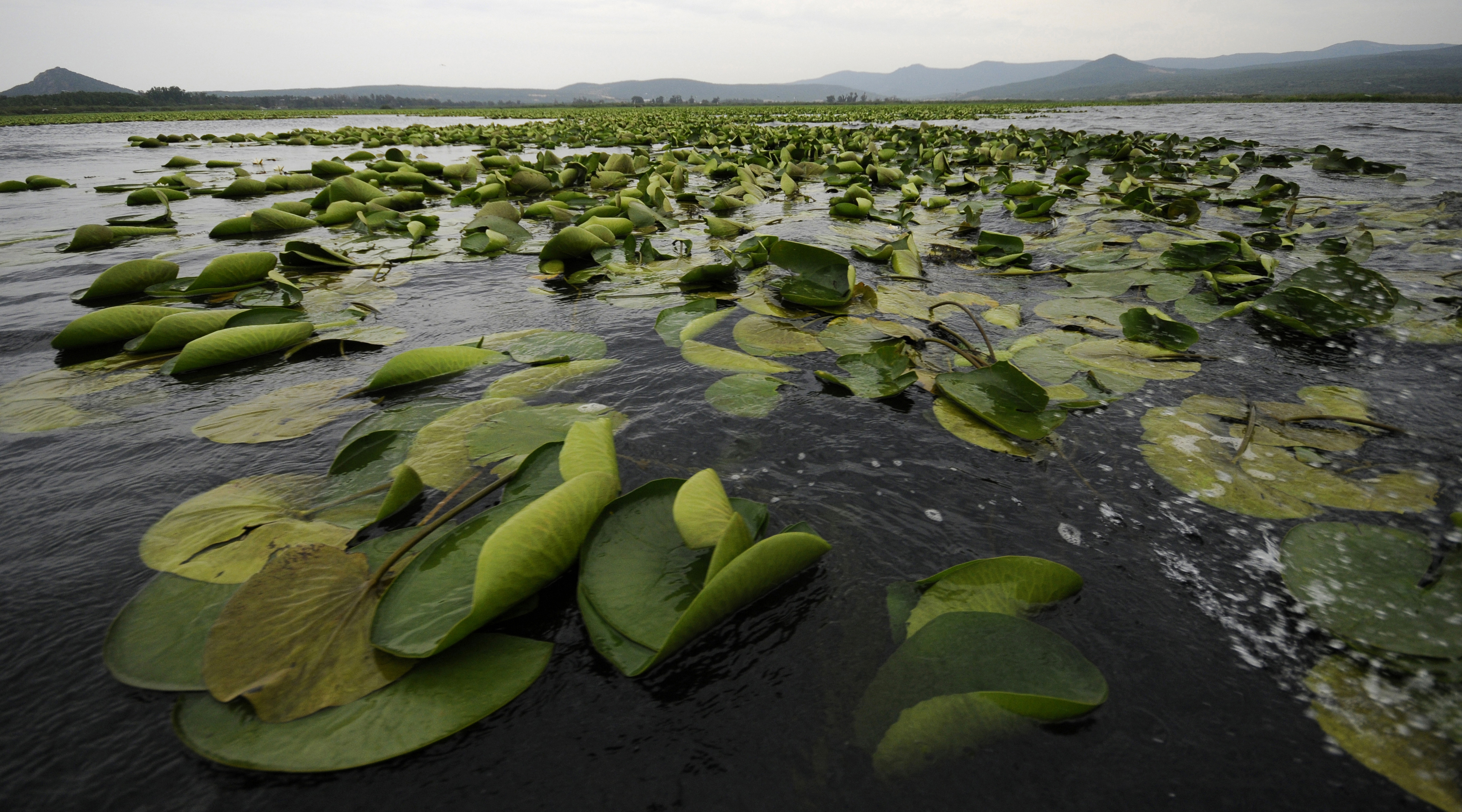
Lake Tonga

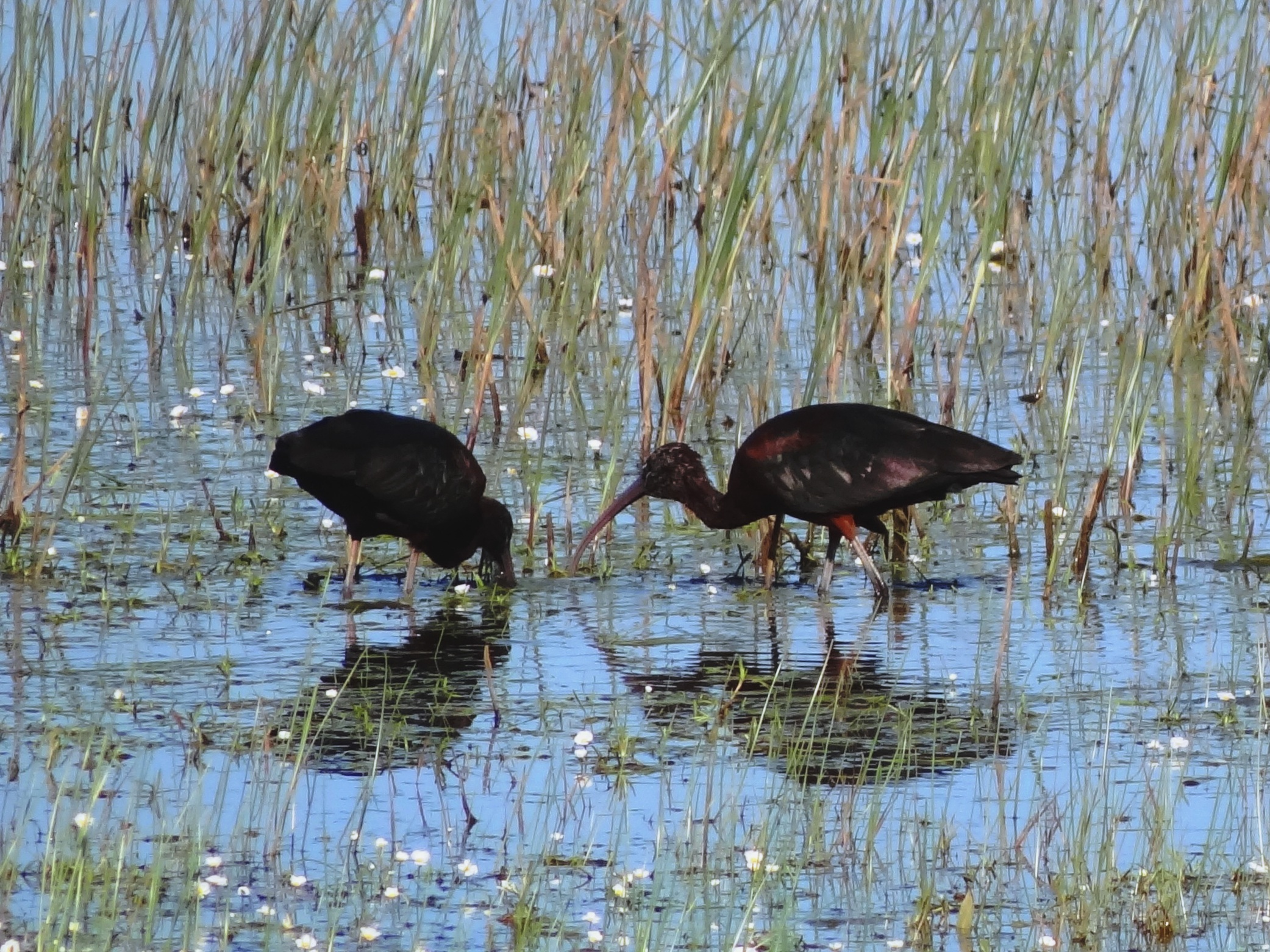
Glossy ibis in the park

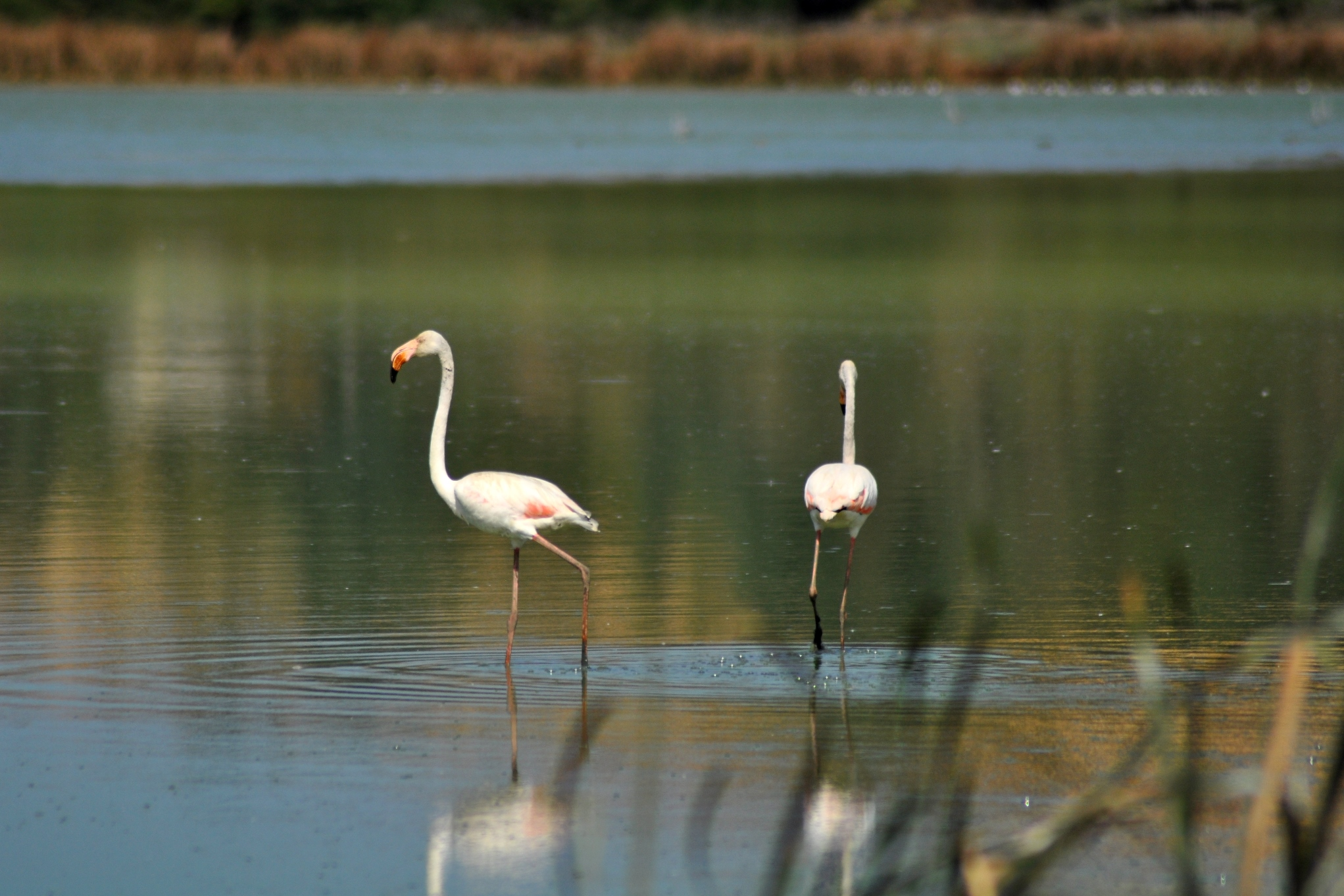
Greater flamingos in the park

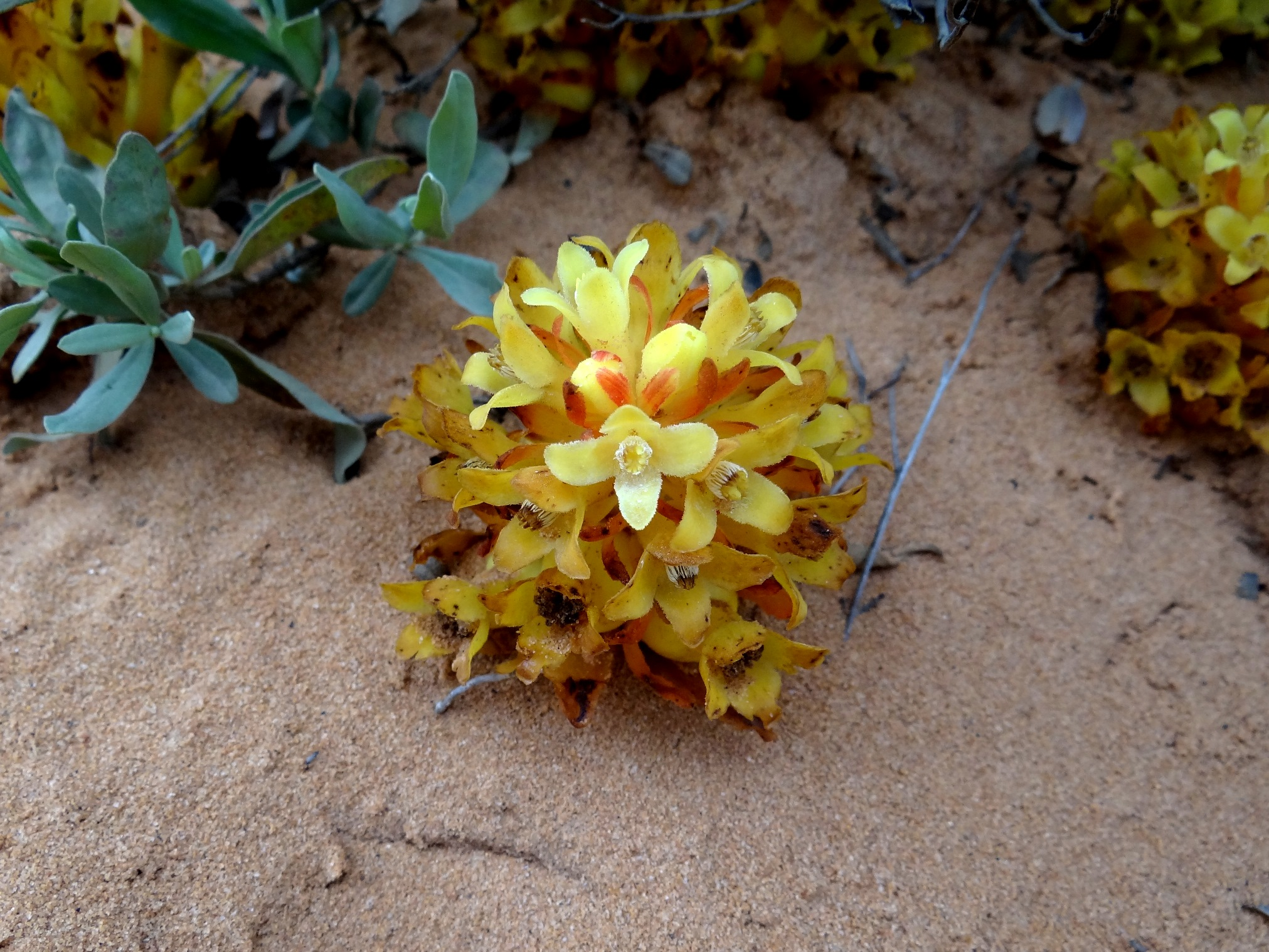
Cytinus hypocistis in the park

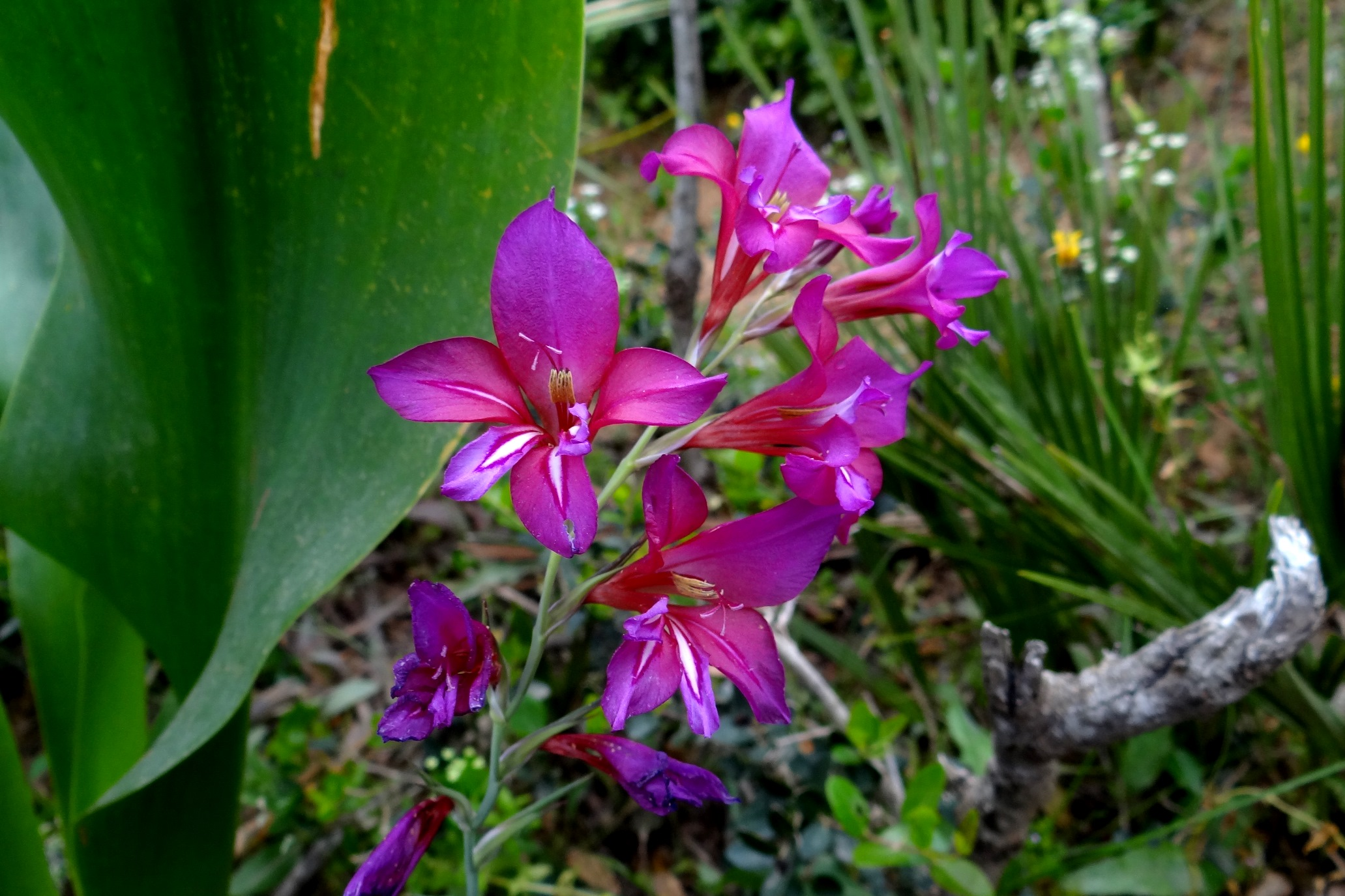
Gladiolus communis in the park

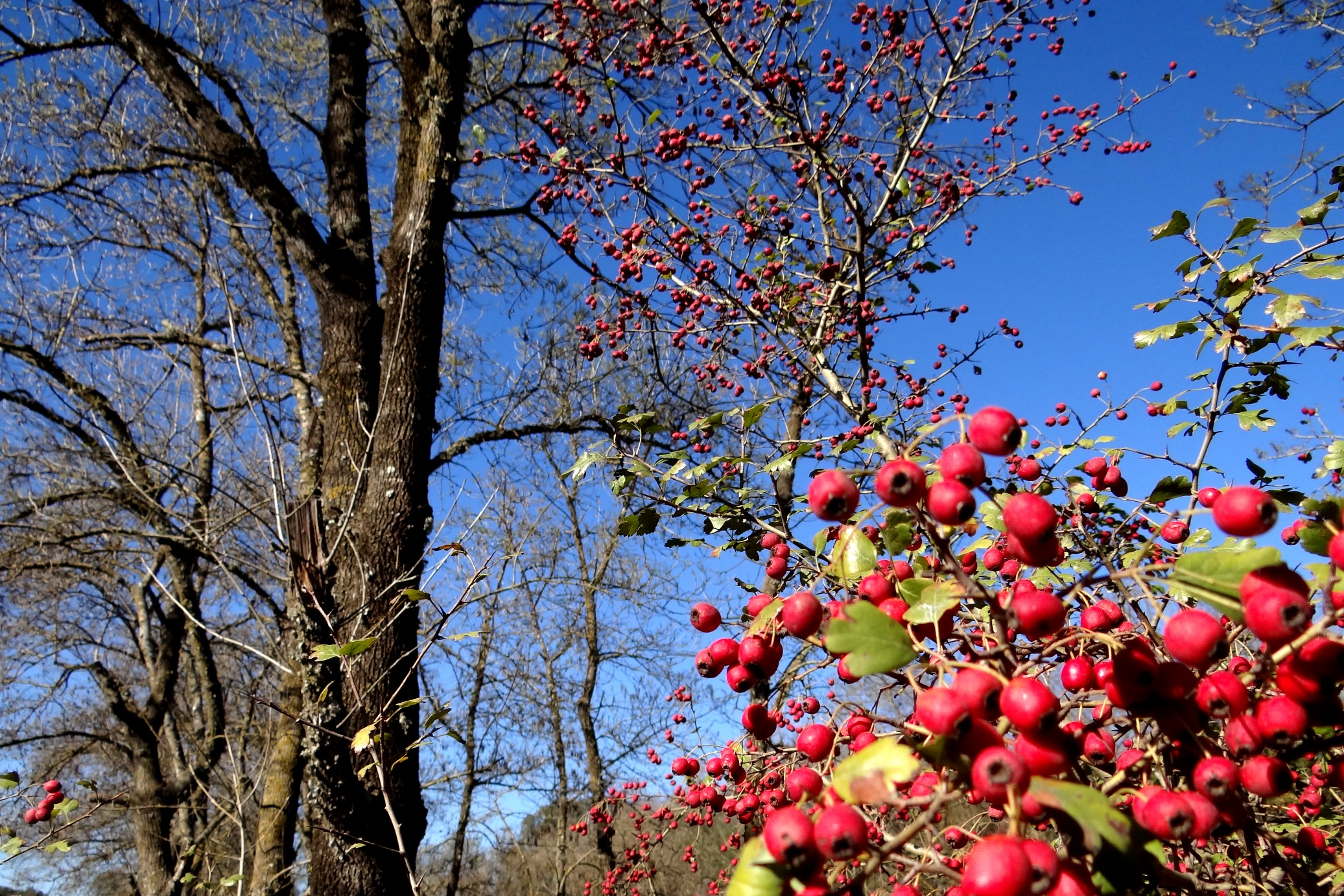
Crataegus laevigata in the park

== Human population ==
87,000 people live in the El Kala National Park and Biosphere Reserve.

== Tourism ==
The park averaged 30,000 visitors in 2001.
