= Zitouna, El Taref =

Coordinates: 36°40′05″N 8°14′05″E

- Commune and town
- Interactive map of Zitouna, El Taref
- Country: Algeria
- Province: El Taref Province

Population (1998)
  - Total: 8,367
- Time zone: UTC+1 (CET)

Zitouna, El Taref is a town and commune in El Taref Province, Algeria. According to the 1998 census it has a population of 8,367.
