= Bougous =

Coordinates: 36°39′34″N 8°22′10″E

- Commune and town
- Interactive map of Bougous
- Country: Algeria
- Province: El Taref Province

Population (1998)
  - Total: 10,576
- Time zone: UTC+1 (CET)

Bougous is a town and commune in El Taref Province, Algeria. According to the 1998 census it has a population of 10,576.
