= Lac des Oiseaux =

Coordinates: 36°47′N 8°07′E

- Commune and town
- Interactive map of Lac des Oiseaux
- Country: Algeria
- Province: El Taref Province

Population (1998)
  - Total: 9,320
- Time zone: UTC+1 (CET)

Lac des Oiseaux is a town and commune in El Taref Province, Algeria. According to the 1998 census it has a population of 9,320.
