= Aïn El Assel =

Coordinates: 36°47′11″N 8°22′57″E

- Commune and town
- Interactive map of Aïn El Assel
- Country: Algeria
- Province: El Taref
- District: El Taref

Population (1998)
  - Total: 12,482
- Time zone: UTC+1 (CET)

Aïn El Assel is a town and commune in El Taref Province, Algeria. According to the 1998 census it has a population of 12,482.
