= Raml Souk =

Coordinates: 36°47′10″N 8°32′08″E

- Commune and town
- Interactive map of Raml Souk
- Country: Algeria
- Province: El Taref Province

Population (1998)
  - Total: 3,715
- Time zone: UTC+1 (CET)

Raml Souk is a town and commune in El Taref Province, Algeria. According to the 1998 census it has a population of 3,715.
