= Chebaita Mokhtar =

Coordinates: 36°45′21″N 7°44′30″E

- Commune and town
- Interactive map of Chebaita Mokhtar
- Country: Algeria
- Province: El Taref Province

Population (1998)
  - Total: 20,913
- Time zone: UTC+1 (CET)

Chebaita Mokhtar is a town and commune in El Taref Province, Algeria. According to the 1998 census it has a population of 20,913.
