= Souarekh =

- Location within Algeria
- Coordinates: 36°52′55″N 8°33′51″E
- Country: Algeria
- Province: El Taref

Population (2008)
  - Total: 8,173
- Time zone: UTC+1 (West Africa Time)

Souarekh is a town and commune in El Taref Province, Algeria.
