= Zerizer =

Coordinates: 36°43′38″N 7°53′41″E

- Commune and town
- Interactive map of Zerizer
- Country: Algeria
- Province: El Taref Province

Population (1998)
  - Total: 10,105
- Time zone: UTC+1 (CET)

Zerizer is a town and commune in El Taref Province, Algeria. According to the 1998 census it has a population of 10,105.
