= El Aioun, Taref =

El Aioun
- Commune
- Location in Algeria
- Coordinates: 36°49′38″N 8°36′00″E
- Country: Algeria
- Province: El Taref Province
- Time zone: UTC+1 (CET)

El Aioun is a commune in El Taref Province, Algeria. According to the 1998 census it has a population of 4,591.
