= Ahnif =

Coordinates: 36°20′09″N 4°15′43″E

- Commune and town
- Interactive map of Ahnif
- Country: Algeria
- Province: Bouïra Province

Population (1998)
  - Total: 10,268
- Time zone: UTC+1 (CET)

Ahnif is a town and commune in Bouïra Province, Algeria. According to the 1998 census it has a population of 10,268. It is connected to the rail network by the Ahnif Railway Station.
