= Lake Mellah =

Lake in El Taref Province, Algeria

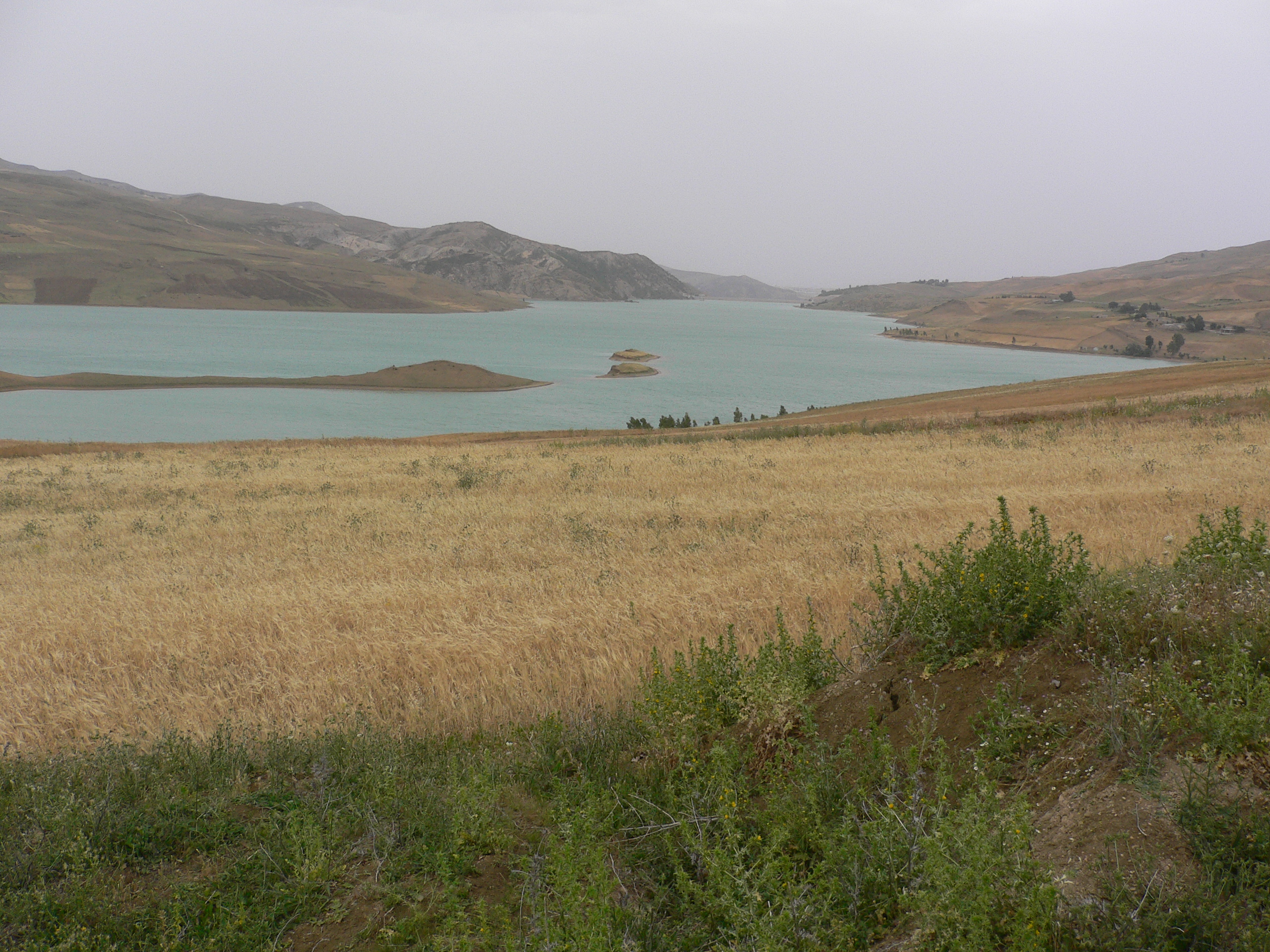
- Location: El Taref Province, Algeria
- Coordinates: 36°53′39″N 8°19′33″E
- Type: Lake

Lake Mellah is a saltwater lake situated within the boundaries of El Kala National Park in El Taref Province, Algeria. It was designated a vital site in accordance with the Ramsar Convention on September 12, 2004.

== Overview ==
Lake Mellah is a salinity lake that is connected to the sea via a narrow canal through a series of dunes approximately 900 meters. It is situated within the central region of El-Kala National Park, which encompasses two additional freshwater lakes, namely Lake Tonga and Lake Oubeira. These three lakes have been designated as wetlands of international significance under the Ramsar Convention by UNESCO.

The lake is situated between the most northeastern city of El-Kala and the Algeria–Tunisia border. It has an area of approximately 2,257 hectares, an average depth of 3 meters, and a maximum depth of 6 meters.

In addition to the lake itself, the site encompasses a small brackish river delta and a small temporary freshwater lagoon, which is fed by rain and groundwater and surrounded by a set of dunes.

== Climate ==
The climate is classified as Mediterranean, with an average annual temperature of 18.9 degrees Celsius. The dry season, which extends for four months, is marked by the lowest temperatures observed in January and the highest temperatures in August. The region experiences the greatest precipitation levels in the fall and winter, with the lowest levels occurring in the summer. The average annual precipitation exceeds 700 millimeters.

== Biodiversity ==
The lake serves as a conduit for biological lifeforms due to its dual exchange with the surrounding watershed and the sea via the canal. The delta is the habitat of species such as Salicornia and Juncus.

The lake's high salinity contributes to the biodiversity of phytoplankton, zooplankton, and fish, and it serves as a nursery site for fish species such as northern wolffish, Sole, Salema porgy, and sand steenbras.

Furthermore, the site is frequented by a plethora of avian and reptilian species, which are drawn to the abundance of food sources. It serves as a habitat for a diverse array of waterbirds, including the great cormorant, the Great crested grebe, and the Tufted duck. The local populace engages in the cultivation of peanuts.
