= El Taref Province =

Province of Algeria

El Taref Province ولاية الطارف
- Province
- Map of Algeria highlighting El Taref
- Coordinates: 36°46′N 8°19′E
- Country: Algeria
- Capital: El Taref

Area
  - Total: 3,339 km^{2} (1,289 sq mi)

Population (2019)
  - Total: 481,136
  - Density: 144/km^{2} (370/sq mi)
- Time zone: UTC+01 (CET)
- Area Code: +213 (0) 38
- ISO 3166 code: DZ-36
- Districts: 7
- Municipalities: 24

El Taref (Arabic: ولاية الطارف) is a province (wilaya) of Algeria, with a population of 481,136 inhabitants in 2019. El Kala is a port town in this province and El Taref is the capital city. El Kala, a port town in this province, is home to El Kala National Park and, Lake Mellah.

== History ==
The province was created from parts of Annaba Province and Guelma Province in 1984.

== Administrative divisions ==
It is made up of 7 districts, divided into 24 municipalities.

=== Districts ===
1. Ben M'Hidi
2. Besbes
3. Bouhadjar
4. Boutheldja
5. Dréan
6. El Kala
7. El Taref

=== Communes ===
1. Aïn El Assel
2. Aïn Kerma
3. Asfour
4. Ben Mehdi
5. Béni Amar
6. Berrihane
7. Besbes
8. Bougous
9. Bouhadjar
10. Bouteldja
11. Chebaita Mokhtar
12. Cheffia
13. Chihani
14. Dréan
15. El Aioun, Taref
16. Echatt
17. El Kala
18. El Taref
19. Hammam Béni Salah
20. Lac des Oiseaux
21. Oued Zitoun
22. Raml Souk
23. Souarekh
24. Zerizer
25. Zitouna
