= Aït Daoud (Aurès) =

- Berber tribe
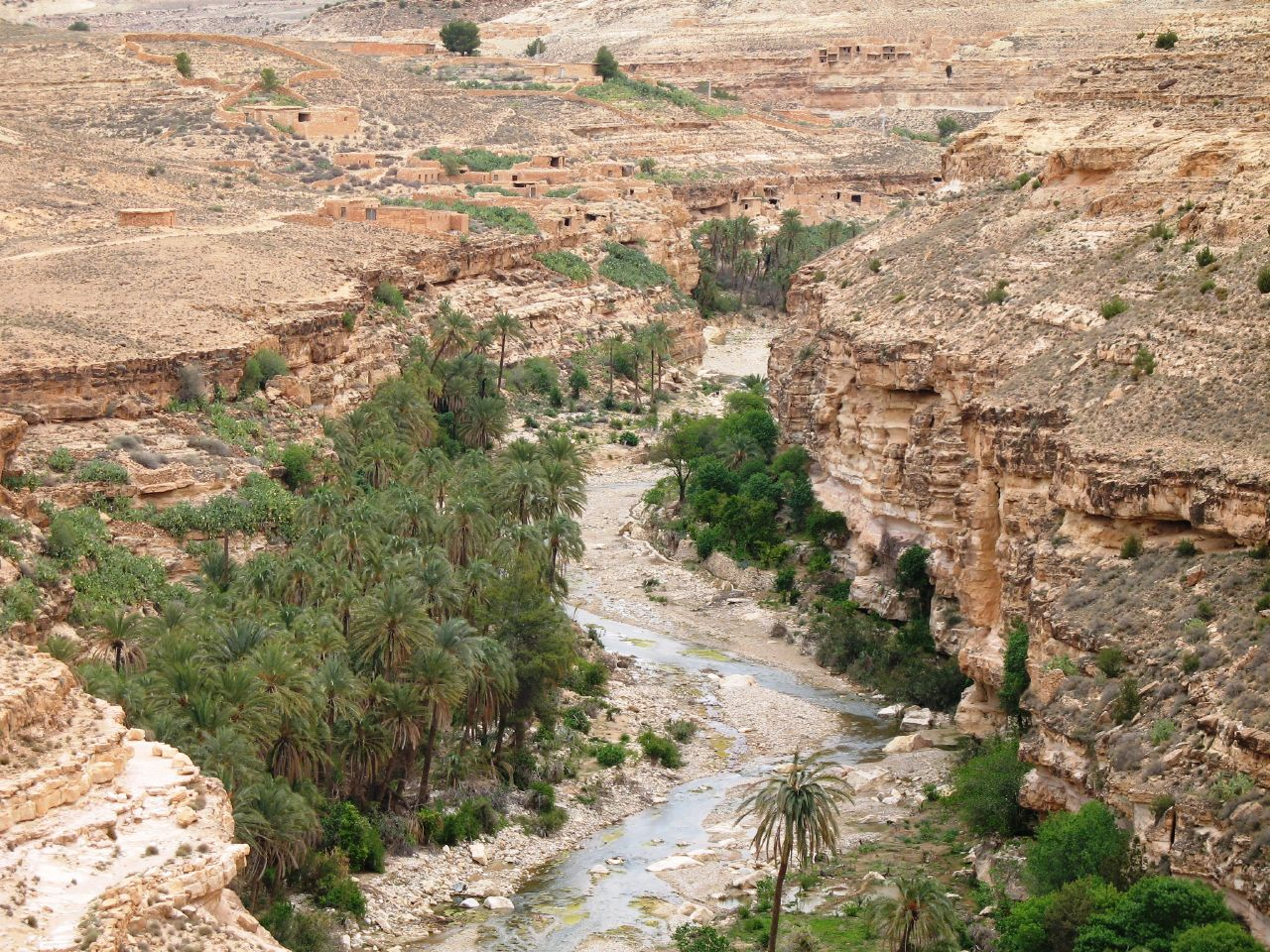
- Oued Abiod territory of Aït Daoud near Ghoufi
- Location: Aures
- Religion: Sunni Islam

The Aït Daoud are one of the three largest Berber hirfiqin (faction, tribe) of Aures Mountain which are respectively Ait Daoud, Ait Si Mhand and Ait Si Ali Moussa.

Oued-Abdi (in Berber: ighzer n abdi) and Oued el-Abiod (in Berber: ighzer amellal) are populated respectively by two main tribes of the Aurès, which are among the largest in number: the Aït Abdi and the Aït-Daoud. The Chaouïa of these tribes trace their origin to the different versions of the legend of the old Bourek, who is said to have married Aïcha the Mad and Touba. This legend has more symbolic and ethnological value than historical value. These two tribes originally settled in the Azreg; the Aït-Daoud (or Touaba) later settled in their own valley. Joined by the Aït Sidi Belkheir (whose branches are the Labloub and the Smaïl) and the Iheddaden, they twice drove out the Aït Oudjana and eventually extended their territory over a northeast –southwest strip of 70 km by 20, including the upper Oued el Abiod (from Tighanimine at the foot of the Ichmoul) to the plains of Medina and Takamamt.

The Turkish presence was ultimately very limited, and their loose authority left no memory because the Aït Daoud refused them access to their valley. The Turks were content to tax the Aurasians at the foot of the massif during the harvests. The Bey Ahmed of Constantine, as well as the secretary of Abd el-Kader, Mohamed Segbir, had taken refuge in the massif. After the founding of Batna and the capture of Biskra, the conquest began in 1845 (Bedeau campaign). The Aït Daoud did not fight, in order to avoid pillage; the Aït Abdi went back on their submission to the Aït Oudjana and were beaten and raided. In 1848, Canrobert intimidated the rebellious Oudjana, and Ahmed Bey surrendered to the commander of Saint-Germain. Over the following two years, Nara was destroyed by Carbuccia and then, after the siege of the oasis of Zâatcha, by Canrobert. Saint-Arnaud consolidated French domination with a tour throughout the massif. A series of revolts followed, directed mainly against the intermediaries employed by the administration. In the first, Desveaux crushed the insurrection led by Si Saddock el Hadj in 1859. In 1879, the Lehala faction of the Aït Daoud, led by Mohamed Ameziane, instigated serious unrest, but it perished while fleeing across the desert, and the tribes were heavily fined. In 1880, the Derdour monks of Oued Abdi were interned, and in 1916, conscription pushed the Chaouïs of Belezma to revolt and those of the Aurès to desert. In 1886, the two main tribes of Ait Daoud and Ait Abdi were placed in the Mixed Commune of Aurès.
