= List of World Heritage Sites in Algeria =

Location of World Heritage Sites in Algeria. The red dots represent cultural site. The blue dot represents a mixed site.

The United Nations Educational, Scientific and Cultural Organization (UNESCO) World Heritage Sites are places of importance to cultural or natural heritage as described in the UNESCO World Heritage Convention, established in 1972. Cultural heritage consists of monuments (such as architectural works, monumental sculptures, or inscriptions), groups of buildings, and sites (including archaeological sites). Natural features (consisting of physical and biological formations), geological and physiographical formations (including habitats of threatened species of animals and plants), and natural sites which are important from the point of view of science, conservation, or natural beauty, are defined as natural heritage. Algeria accepted the convention on 24 June 1974. There are seven World Heritage Sites in Algeria, with a further twelve on the tentative list.

The first site in Algeria added to the list was Al Qal'a of Beni Hammad, in 1980. The most recent site added was Kasbah of Algiers, which was listed in 1992. Of the seven sites on the list, six are listed for cultural significance while Tassili n'Ajjer is listed for both cultural and natural significance. From 2002 to 2006, Tipasa was listed as endangered because of inadequate management of the site, including vandalism, growing urbanisation in the buffer zone, and unsuitable restoration techniques. Algeria has served on the World Heritage Committee three times.

== World Heritage Sites ==
UNESCO lists sites under ten criteria; each entry must meet at least one of the criteria. Criteria i through vi are cultural, and vii through x are natural.

World Heritage Sites
Site	Image	Location (province)	Year listed	UNESCO data	Description
Al Qal'a of Beni Hammad	Ruins of a mosque with a minaret in stone	M'Sila	1980	102; iii (cultural)	Qal'at Bani Hammad was founded by the Hammadid dynasty in 1007 in a mountain setting, initially as a military stronghold that became their capital. It was influential in the development of the Arab architecture, including in the Maghreb, Andalusia, and Sicily. It was abandoned in 1090 under the threat of the Banu Hilal invasion and later demolished in 1152. The main mosque (the remains of the minaret pictured) was one of the largest and oldest in Algeria.
Tassili n'Ajjer	Rock painting depicting people with bows chasing a bull	Tamanrasset	1982	179; i, iii, vii, viii (mixed)	The vast sandstone plateau has numerous rock formations, created by water and wind erosion. There are Precambrian rocks and sediment sequences that are of high geological interest. There are more than 15,000 rock paintings and carvings in the area, making it one of the richest prehistoric rock art sites in the world. The images cover the period from around 10,000 BCE to the first centuries of CE. They depict human figures and animals and illustrate the evolution of society and changes of the climate. Some of the depicted animals, such as the hippopotamus, were present in periods with more water, but have now been absent for millennia.
M'Zab Valley	A large earthen construction with elaborate architecture	Ghardaïa	1982	188; ii, iii, iv (cultural)	The five ksour (singular ksar) in the M'Zab Valley were founded between 1012 and 1350 by the Ibadites. Ksar is a type of a fortified village adapted to a harsh desert environment. Each of the five ksour has a mosque that can act as a fortress with a minaret that is also a watchtower, as well as an adjacent cemetery and palm grove. Up to the present day, people have maintained essentially the same building techniques as in the 11th century. In the 20th century, the ksour model influenced architects and urban planners, including Le Corbusier. Mzab Ghardaïa is pictured.
Djémila	Roman ruins with standing columns	Sétif	1982	191; iii, iv (cultural)	The Roman town of Djémila was founded in the late 1st century under the Emperor Nerva. It was a defensive settlement, located at an elevation of 900 m (3,000 ft). It expanded in the 3rd century and declined with the collapse of Rome in the 6th century. Today in ruins, there are remains of the forum, temples, basilicas, triumphal arches, and houses, as well as early Christian sites, including a large cathedral and baptistery. A collection of mosaics has been preserved, depicting mythological and everyday motifs.
Tipasa	Ruins of an ancient mausoleum in a cylindrical shape	Tipaza	1982	193; iii, iv (cultural)	Tipasa was founded in the 6th century BCE as a Punic trading post and port of call. A vast necropolis remains from this period and testifies to the cultural exchanges of peoples in the region. It was conquered by the Romans in the 2nd century BCE. Buildings dating from the Roman period include the Royal Mausoleum of Mauretania (pictured). There are Christian buildings from the 3rd and 4th centuries. In the 430s, the city was taken by the Vandals, retaken by the Byzantines, and declined in the 6th century. From 2002 to 2006, the site was listed as endangered because of inadequate management of the site, including vandalism, growing urbanisation in the buffer zone, and unsuitable restoration techniques.
Timgad	Ruins of a Roman city with several standing columns and a triumphal arch	Batna	1982	194; ii, iii, iv (cultural)	Timgrad was founded as a Roman military colony by the Emperor Trajan in 100. It had a triumphal arch, temples, markets, and baths. It is a good illustration of Roman urban planning. The city fell into decline with the Vandal invasion in 430 and was finally abandoned in the 8th century, following the Arab invasion.
Kasbah of Algiers	Interior of a palace with tiles on the walls and horseshoe arches	Algiers	1992	565; ii, iv (cultural)	The kasbah, or fortified citadel, is located on the Mediterranean coast. Built on the site of a Phoenician trading post from the 6th century BCE, it got its present layout in the 16th century under the Ottomans. It has old mosques, Ottoman-style palaces, souks, hammams, and traditional buildings that reflect the life in a Mediterranean Muslim city. At the time of inscription, it was home to around 50,000 people. An interior of a palace is pictured.

== Tentative list ==
In addition to sites inscribed on the World Heritage List, member states can maintain a list of tentative sites that they may consider for nomination. Nominations for the World Heritage List are only accepted if the site was previously listed on the tentative list. Algeria maintains twelve properties on its tentative list.

Tentative sites
Site	Image	Location (province)	Year listed	UNESCO criteria	Description
Ighamaouen, the Collective Fortresses-Granaries of the Touat Gourara Tidikelt Cultural Park		Timimoun	2025	iii, iv (cultural)	The Ighamaouen (plural form of Agheem in the Tamazight language) are the communal granary-fortresses, characteristic to the south-west part of Algeria. They date to the 10th century and were constructed of earth and stone. They are located on defensive positions along the Trans-Saharan trade routes. The nomination comprises six such sites.
The Augustinian Routes in Algeria	A modern church overlooking Roman ruins	several sites	2025	ii, iii, vi (cultural)	This nomination comprises a series of archaeological sites connected to the early Christian theologian and philosopher and one of the most important Church Fathers of the Latin Church, Saint Augustine of Hippo. He was born in 354 in Thagaste and died in 430 in Hippo Regius, today's Annaba (Roman ruins of the city with a 19th-century Saint Augustin Basilica pictured).
Ksour of the Algerian Saharan Atlas	Partly ruined brown walls with a tower in the background	El Bayadh, Lagouat, Naama	2025	ii, iv (cultural)	This nomination comprises five ksour, or fortified villages, in Saharan Atlas. They are representative of the type of settlement in southern Algeria, demonstrating the adaptation of the locals to arid conditions. They are made of earth and stone and have sustainable water management systems. The villages were important as hubs of the Trans-Saharan trade. Boussemghoun is pictured.
The Royal Mausoleums of Ancient Algeria (from the 4th century BC to the 6th century AD)	Ruins of a mausoleum in stone	several sites	2025	i, iii, iv (cultural)	This nomination comprises six mausolea from 3rd to 1st centuries BCE that were built for rulers of Numidia and Mauretania (the Royal Mausoleum of Mauretania, which is already listed as a World Heritage Site with Tipasa, tomb of Masinissa in El Khroub, pictured, Madghacen, and the Mausoleum of Beni-Rhénane), and the tombs from the 5th and 6th centuries, Jedars and the Tin Hinan Tomb.
The oasis systems of the Rhoufi and Oued Labiod gorges	Ruined stone buildings surrounded by palm trees	Batna, Biskra	2025	iii, v, viii (mixed)	The Aurès Mountains reach above 2,000 m (6,600 ft) and provide different types of habitats, including the Quercus ilex, cedar, and Aleppo pine forests at higher elevations and palm groves in valleys. Traditionally, the region has been inhabited by Berbers who constructed settlements adapted to mountain environment, such as El Kantara and Menaâ. Houses in Ghoufi (Rhoufi) are pictured.
Tefedest Massif in the Ahaggar Cultural Park	Brown mountains	Tamanrasset	2025	i, iii, viii, x (mixed)	Approximately 200 shelters with rock art have been discovered at the site, showing the development of cultures and climate change in the Sahara starting from 12,000 years ago. The granite massif of Tefedest (pictured), reaching up to 2,336 m (7,664 ft), is of interest to geologists studying processes that have shaped the Sahara in the past. The broad area has different types of habitats, including wetlands, that are important to endemic plant and animal species and as a stopover for migratory birds.
Nedroma and the Trara	A mosque with a minaret made in brick	Tlemcen	2025	ii, iv, v (cultural)	Nedroma, in the Trara Mountains, was founded in the 12th century. After the Reconquista, it became home to many people of Moorish origin who left Andalusia. In the 16th century, it was an important textile centre. The Great Mosque is pictured.
El Kala National Park	Plain with a river in the background and a rainbow in the sky	El Taref	2025	vii, ix, x (natural)	The national park features a mosaic landscape with different types of forests, marshes, wetlands, Mediterranean coast, and mountainous areas. It is rich in biodiversity and home to the Barbary stag and African wildcat. The area is also an important stopover for migratory birds.
Djurdjura National Park	View on a green landscape from a tall hill, with big tree branches in the foreground	Bouïra, Tizi Ouzou	2025	vii, viii, x (natural)	The national park is located in the Djurdjura mountain range of the Tell Atlas. The highest peak, Lalla Khedidja, reaches an altitude of 2,308 m (7,572 ft). The mountains exhibit several karst phenomena, including deep sinkholes. From the biogeographical perspective, the area is a refugium for animal and plant species that have fled the last glaciation. It is home to the Barbary macaque monkeys.
Archaeological heritage of the city of Tébessa	A Roman-era triumphal arch, a scene after rain	Tébessa	2025	ii, iv (cultural)	The nomination comprises historical sites dating to the times of the Roman and Byzantine Empires when Tébessa was a flourishing city. They include Roman temples, the triumphal Arch of Caracalla (pictured), the ruins of the Tebessa Basilica, an amphitheatre, and Byzantine walls and ramparts.
The cultural park of Saoura	Palm trees, a city, and sand dunes seen from a hill	Béchar, Béni Abbès	2025	iii, iv, ix, x (mixed)	From the cultural perspective, the area is significant because of its prehistoric archaeological sites and rock art, as well as because of numerous ksour, or fortified villages, that are located along the Oued Saoura, a wadi. From the natural perspective, the area has mosaic habitats with ergs, arid steppes, mountains, wadis, as well as wetlands. It supports diverse flora and fauna, including the dorcas gazelle, Cuvier's gazelle, and numerous bird species.
Oasian Landscape of Oued Souf	Desert town with palms in the background	El Oued	2025	iii, v (cultural)	El Oued is an oasis town that is built above an underground aquifer which allows growing of palms that are planted in vast tunnels in the sand, directly above the water table. This type of agriculture requires constant maintenance and removing of the accumulating sand.

== See also ==
- List of Intangible Cultural Heritage elements in Algeria
