= Fatma Tazoughert =

Fatma Tazoughert (1544 – 1641), also spelled Tazouguerth, Tazuggaght, or Tazughert, from the Berber Tazeggʷaght, "the Red," was a Chaoui Berber queen from the Aurès Mountains of present-day Algeria.

== Biography ==
The life of Fatma Tazoughert is told in poems and songs of the Chaoui people, which describe her as "a beautiful and redheaded queen." According to the oral tradition of the Aṭ Fatma tribe, she was born in 1544 and died in 1641 in the Belezma Range of the Aurès Mountains, and she hailed from a tribal confederation in the Aurès. She is thought to have been the first woman to rule the Aurès since Kahina in the 7th century.

According to the Algerian writer Mohamed Nadir Sebaa, in 1566, Tazoughert was said to have conquered the cities of Marrakesh, Meknes, and Fez in what is now Morocco. This inspired Abd al-Rahman al-Majdoub, a Sufi poet from a Berber family in Morocco, to write a pamphlet addressed to her. She was known as a formidable warrior, a military leader with an excellent sense of organization and command at the head of her troops. Dressed as a hoplite, she retained her freedom of movement while leading the masses and wielded unquestionable influence over the mountain communities.

She was also described as a grand Sufi priestess and healer who cured illnesses using plants, a skill she had learned from her mother. Notably, she was said to have united the Berber tribes with the Arabized ones, and to have brought together a council of sages exclusively composed of women. She was described as a woman with a strong personality who did not hesitate to execute her brother Zoltan and to exile her younger brother Sellam, both of whom had questioned her decisions. It was thus that she seized control of Belezma in the 16th century.

The mother of 17 children, according to oral tradition, she could recite the Quran by heart and maintained commercial relations with Christians and Jews.

In the 20th century, the Chaoui poet Lalla Khoukha Boudjenit wrote an homage to her.
