= Mohamed Nadir Sebaa =

Algerian poet and writer

- Born: 28 November 1956 (age 69); Batna, Algeria
- Occupations: novelist and poet
- Awards: International Competition in Literature Award (1987) Malek Haddad Prize (1992) The Senegalese Aminata Sow Fall Award in (1993)

Mohamed Nadir Sebaa (Arabic: محمد النذير السبع) is an Algerian novelist and poet, born on 28 November 1956 in Batna. He writes novels and poetry in the French language. The novelist is known for focusing his work on dissecting the reality of his society over different periods of time, and by mentioning the names of places and people as they are pronounced locally, without translation or modification.

Sebaa had a friendship with Kateb Yacine, who described him in a letter he sent to him as "The writer of Humility, Simplicity and True Sense."

== Education ==
He studied in several Algerian cities such as Batna, Skikda and Annaba, and graduated with a university degree from the National School of Administration in Algiers.

== Career ==
He started teaching at university Batna 1 Hadj Lakhdar Algeria, as a professor of literature. In 2004, he was entrusted with the task of supervising the culture sector in Wilaya of Batna. Sebaa, a founder of the magazine "Culture Books," (Arabic: kraris althaqafa). In the media, Sebaa contributed articles to the weekly French-language "Estrangement" (Arabic: Al-Qutah), owned by the writer Tahar Djaout, which disappeared after his death. He also published some articles in the Eurasian newspaper (French section) in 1992, and in the daily "Al-Sharq Al-Jumhouri" published in Annaba.

== Works ==
His first book, "Men on Tracks," was published by the National Book Foundation in 1986.

As for the most recent, it is a book on administrative management, entitled: "Small Application Guide, Administrative management guide in the light of texts" (Arabic: aldalil altatbiqiu alsaghir, dalil altasyir al'iidarii ealaa daw' alnusus).

== Encyclopedia ==
Far from the field of literature, Sebaa wrote a biographical book entitled "Symbols and Speech", published by Dar Elhouda in Ain M'lila in 2009, with a volume of 380 pages. This encyclopedia is a translation of entries about 487 personalities from the world of culture and thought in the Islamic world.

Among the most important of these names are: Imru' al-Qais, Hatim al-Tai, Al-Khansa, Dihya or Damya or (Arabic Al-Kahina), Al-Mutanabbi, Ibn Arabi, Ibn Rushd (Averroes), Fatma Tazoughert, Jamal al-Din al-Afghani, ibn Badis, Omar al-Mukhtar, Isabelle Eberhardt, Mouloud Feraoun, Malek Bennabi, Nasreddine Dinet, and Ahmed Deedat.

The book, which was completed between 1990 and 1997, was scheduled to be published by the University of Batna in 1997. However, it was published with the support of the Ministry of Culture after 12 years' delay.

== Literature ==
- “This is how fate wanted” - by Maha Publishing and Distribution House.
- “Men on the tracks” (French: Des hommes sur les pistes) (1985 - ENAL - 150 pages).
- "Avis de recherche" (1988 - Numidia House - 158 pages).
- "Les Grosses Têtes du Maghreb", Paris, Karthala, 1986.
- "The things goes the other way of our will" (Arabic: tati alriyah bima la tashtahi alsufun),(French: Le vent ne souffle pas au gré des navires) (ENAL - 1992 - Algiers - 171 pages).
- "Innocence coupable" (Editions Fennec - 1992 - 93 pages).
- "Journal d'un flâneur" (CIDIM - Marseille 2003).
- "Batna-Marseille", 2004, Cidim.
- "L'Histoire, les Aurès et les hommes", 2006.
- "Fatma Tazoughert".
- "Témoin des ombres".
- "Rumuz et Calame", by Dar Elhouda (Ain M'lila) - 2009 - 319 pages - (ISBN 978-9947-26-147-7).
- "Le petit guide pratique", 2010.
- "La Passion du cèdre".
- "Les cahiers de la culture".
- "L'hymne au désert" (Édilivre - 2015 - 30 pages - ISBN 978-2-332-99284-0).

== Awards ==
Muhammad Al-Natheer has received several awards inside and outside his country, including:

- International Competition in Literature Award for the City of Algiers (1987), for his novel: “The Moods of Destiny” (Arabic: 'amzijat alqadr).
- Malek Haddad Prize (1992) from Noureddine Aba Foundation, for his novel: "The things goes the other way of our will" (Arabic: tati alriyah bima la tashtahi alsufun).
- The Senegalese Aminata Sow Fall Award in 1993, for his poetry collection "Guilty Innocence" (Arabic: bara'at mudhniba).
- Silver medal in the international competition organized by the Safi Foundation (SAFI) for the University of Morocco (2003).
