= Belezma National Park =

National Park in Algeria

- IUCN category II (national park)
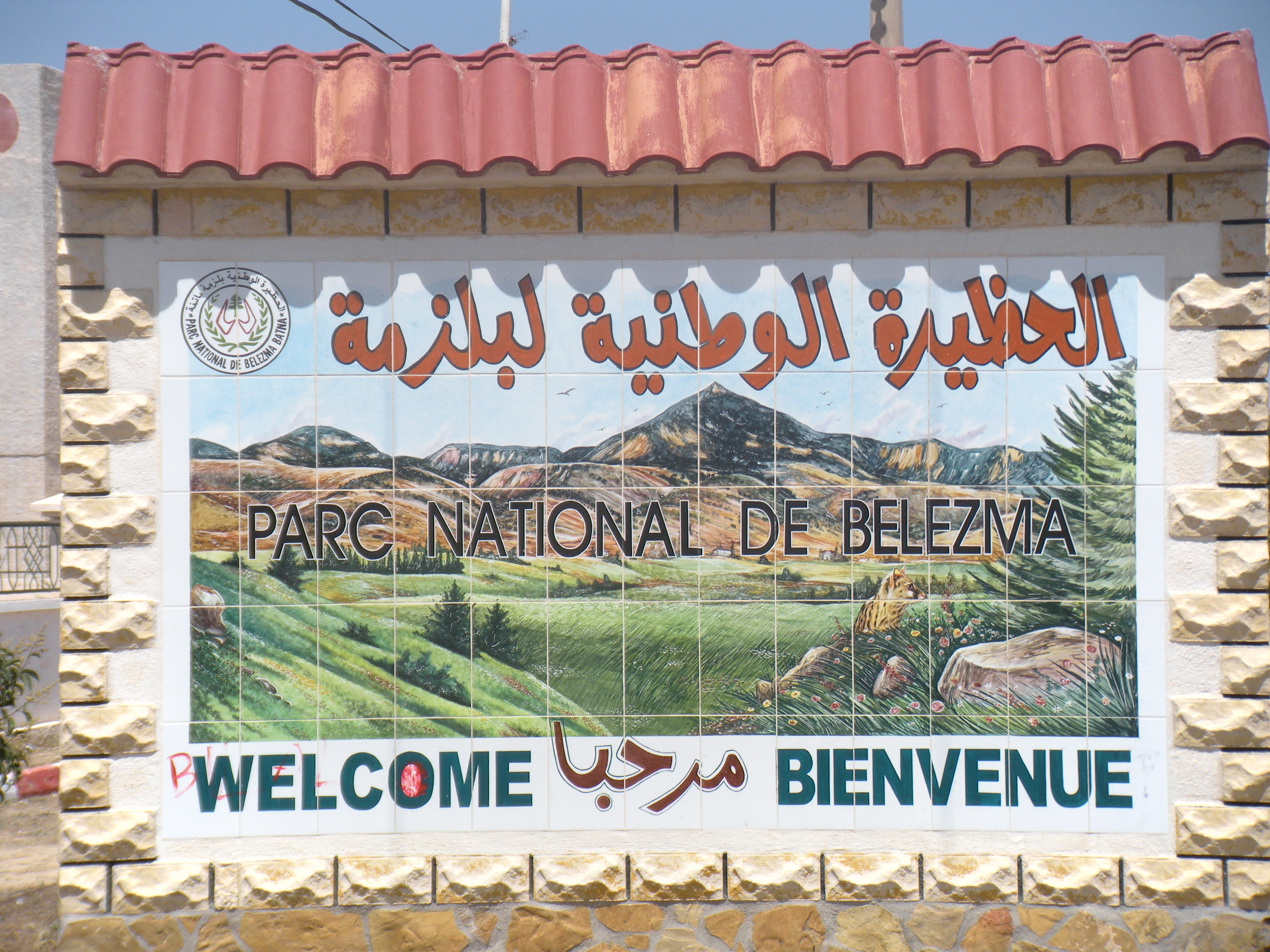

- Location within Algeria
- Interactive map of Belezma National Park
- Location: Batna Province, Algeria (Aurès)
- Nearest city: Batna
- Coordinates: 35°35′N 6°02′E
- Area: 262.5 km^{2} (101.4 sq mi)
- Established: 1984
- Visitors: 100.000

The Belezma National Park (Arabic:الحظيرة الوطنية بلزمة) is one of the most important national parks of Algeria. Created in 1984, it is located in Batna Province on the slopes of the Belezma Range, a subrange of the Aurès Mountains.

== Geography ==
The park covers an area of 262.5 km^{2}. The main summits of the range in the park area are 2,136 m high Djebel Tichaou and the 2,178 m high Djebel Refaâ, the highest peak of the Belezma Range.

=== Environment ===
The biosphere reserve includes several historical sites, caves and tombs, which represent traces of ancient civilizations. The rich mosaic of habitats includes pastures, forests, grasslands, thickets, foothills, rivers and mines. The climate ranges from cool subhumid to dry semi-arid. There are 447 species of flora (14% of the national total) and 309 species of fauna, of which 59 are protected species. It is the largest habitat of the Atlas cedar. The park has been designated an Important Bird Area (IBA) by BirdLife International because it supports significant populations of many bird species.

== Features ==
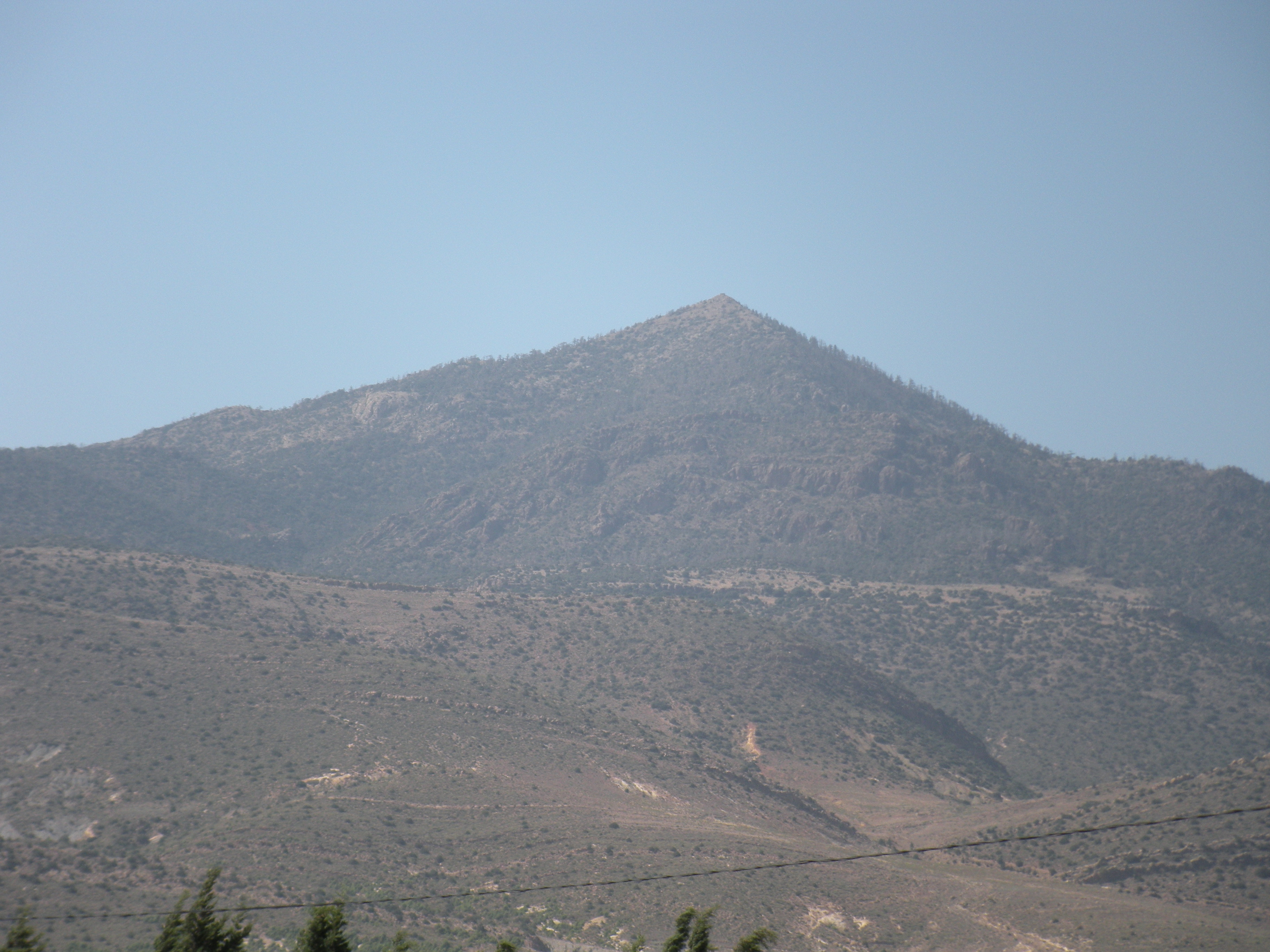
View of one of the mountains of the range in the Park area.

Geological map of the Belezma National Park.

Zones of the Belezma National Park.

== See also ==
- Belezma Range
- Aurès Mountains
