= Djebel Chélia =

Mountain in Algeria

- جبل شيليا
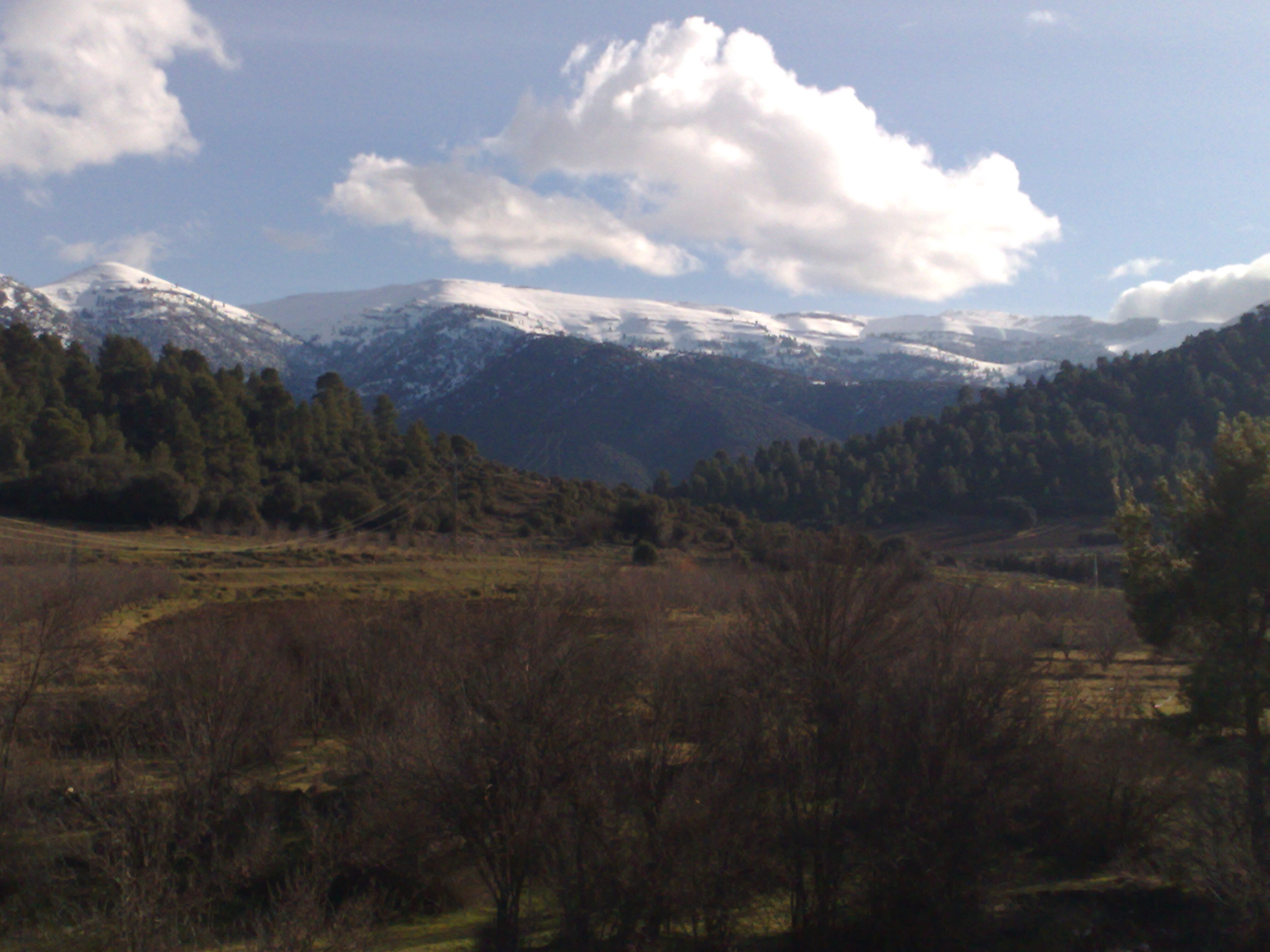

Highest point
- Elevation: 2,328 m (7,638 ft)
- Prominence: 1,612 m (5,289 ft)
- Listing: Ultra, Ribu
- Coordinates: 35°19′06″N 06°38′15″E

Geography
- Location within Algeria
- Country: Algeria
- Parent range: Aurès Mountains, Saharan Atlas

Djebel Chélia (Arabic: جبل شيليا) is a mountain in Algeria. It is the highest point in the Aurès Mountains and second highest peak in Algeria after Mount Tahat. Djebel Chélia is situated in the west of Khenchela, in Bouhmama county. Abiod Valley begins at the foot of Djebel Chélia.

== See also ==
- List of mountains in Algeria
- List of Ultras of Africa
