= Buttafoco Camp Monument =

- Buttafoco Camp Monument
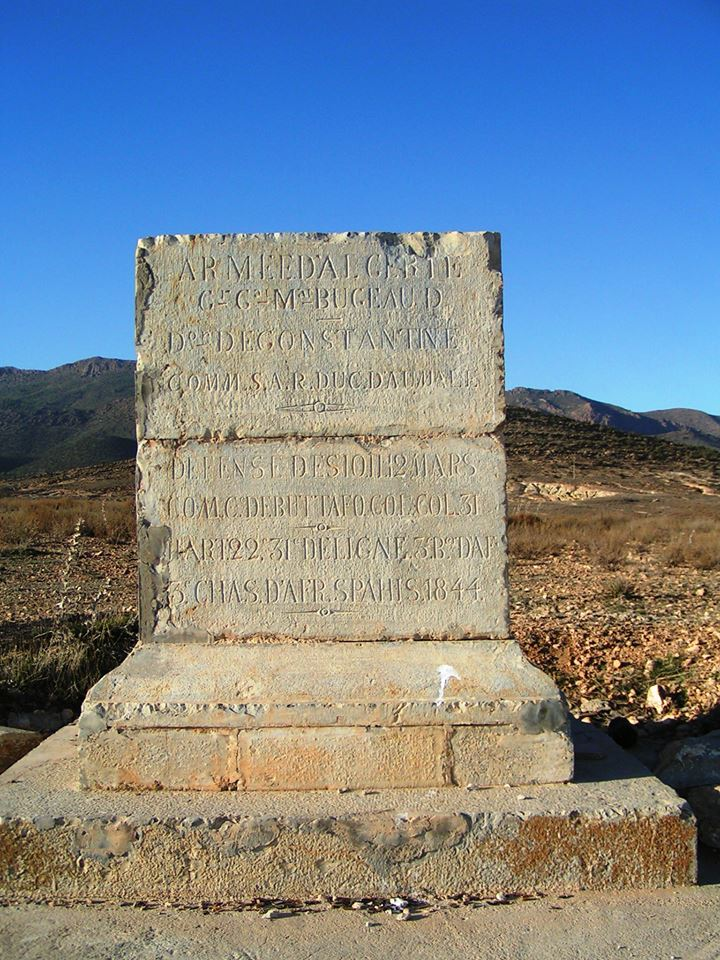
- Interactive map of Buttafoco Camp Monument
- Location: Batna, Algeria
- Coordinates: 35.5768°N 6.1816°E
- Material: Rock
- Length: 1 m
- Width: 1 m
- Height: 1,5 m
- Beginning date: August 19, 1849

The Monument of the Buttafoco camp, also known as the monument to the dead of the Count of Buttafoco's camp, the inaugural stone or stele of the city of Batna, is a monument designed by Colonel Jean-Luc Carbuccia and erected at his initiative on August 19, 1849, to commemorate the capture of the site by the French army.

Originally located at the northern entrance of the current city of Batna in Algeria, the monument suffered many damages throughout its existence, especially during the 1871 insurrection or during its extraction in the 1990s and its relocation to build a new bus station at its original location between 2008 and 2013. It was then located in front of the new bus station of the city, and in 2014 the monument was moved once again to the city's impound lot. Its height is 1.5 m and its width is 1 m. Text is engraved on two of its sides.

== Denomination ==
According to various books and press articles, the monument is referred to by different names. In his book Si Batna m'était contée, the essayist Kamel Chibani refers to it as the "Monument to the Dead of the Comte de Buttafoco Camp", while indicating that its designer, Colonel Carbuccia, named it the "Monument of the Buttafoco Camp". In articles published in the newspapers Liberté and El Watan, usually written by Rachid Hamatou, the journalist uses the phrase "stone" or "inaugural stele of the city of Batna", referring to the fact that it was the first monument built during the official establishment of the city.

== History ==
=== Context ===
At the beginning of France's conquest of Algeria, some Chaoui Berbers had been part of the army of the Dey of Algiers. Those who were able to return to the Aurès warned other mountain dwellers of a possible invasion. When Constantine fell in 1837, Ahmed Bey took refuge in the Aurès and began preparing a new revolt that intensified as the French armies approached. Emir Abdelkader then sent his khalifa, Mohamed Seghir, to the Aurès to incite the Chaouis.

In 1844, the 2nd squadron, accompanied by about fifty horses, was commanded by Colonel Buttafoco. They left on February 7 and arrived at Camp Batna on the 9th. Colonel Buttafoco occupied the area with an artillery team and 1000 infantrymen. The troops, led by the Duke of Aumale, remained until February 21 to prepare for the expedition to the Ziban. The Duke left a small garrison at Camp Batna on February 25.

In 1848, the Duke of Aumale was to head south of Constantine to control the Berber tribes stationed throughout the entire Aurès massif and allow for a breakthrough to the south of the country. Accompanied by senior officers of the colonial army, including Lieutenant Colonel Bedeau, he took possession of the place called Bathent (now Batna), where he erected the monument to establish a military camp.

On August 19, 1849, Viala Charon, the Governor-General of Algeria, founded the city of Batna, which was marked with a cornerstone to commemorate its inauguration.

=== Construction and early destructions ===
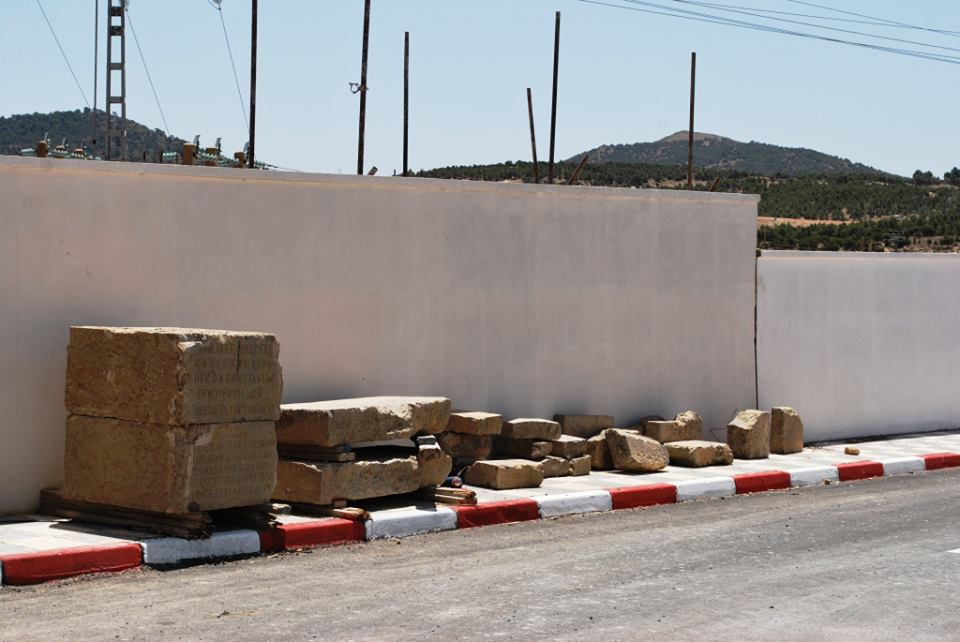
The state of the monument in 2013 in front of the new bus station.

The monument was designed by Colonel Jean-Luc Carbuccia and was erected on August 19, 1849, at his initiative as indicated on its western face. Both faces were engraved at the same time.

The monument was located on a hill near Oued El Gourzi, called the "red bridge," at the current site of the wastewater treatment plant, within the Camp neighborhood known as Dar El Général (the general's house). According to Kamel Chibani, the monument was destroyed during the 1871 uprising, during the attack on Batna on the night of April 25, 1871, by the rebellious tribes who saw it as a symbol of French occupation. There is no indication of what happened to the upper part of the monument.

=== Movement in the 90s ===
The monument was vandalized with graffiti and a part of it was destroyed during the 1990s. It is said to have lost its base during the same period, when it was extracted and moved for the construction of a new bus station at the northeast exit of the city between 2008 and 2013. During the construction of the bus station, the monument remained in front of it and broke into several pieces. It was then moved to the city's impound lot in 2014.

Local authorities stated that the culture department was tasked with restoring the monument. However, according to members of the Friends of Batna association, this project was not carried out because the inaugural stone represents a colonial legacy for a powerful group that claims to be revolutionary.

East side text
ARMEE D'ALGERIE
GR. GAL. MAR. BUGEAUD
DON DE CONSTANTINE
COMM. S.A.R. DUC D'AUMALE

DEFENSE DES IO II 12 MARS
COM.Ct DE BUTTAFOCO.Lt COL. 31
11. ART.22-31 DE LIGNE 3.B. DAF
3. CHAS. D'AFR. SPAHIS 1844

Explanation
Army of Algeria
Governor General Marshal Bugeaud
Division of Constantine
Commander His Royal Highness Duke of Aumale

Défense des IO II 12 mars
Commander Count De Buttafoco, Lieutenant Colonel
1st Artillery 22-31 Line Infantry, 3rd Battalion of Africa
3rd Chasseur d'Afrique spahis 1844

West face text

ARMEE D'ALGERIE

GOUV.G. G. CHARON

DIV. DE CONSTANTINE

GEN. HERBILLON

SUB.D.DE BATNA COL.CARBUCCIA

PLACE INTEND.BUR.ARABE
1 ART.1 GENIE LEG.ETRANGE 2°REG
3 HAS. D'AFR. 3°SPAHIS
3° ESC.TRAIN) (HOPIT.ADM
ERIGEE LE 19 AOUT 1849

Explanation

Army of Algeria

Governor General General Charon

Division of Constantine

General Herbillon

Subdivision of Batna Colonel Carbuccia

Intendant place Arab bureau
1st Foreign Legion Artillery, 2nd Regiment
3rd Chasseur d'Afrique, 3rd Spahis
3rd Squadron Train (Hospital Administration)
Erected on August 19, 1849

The two faces of the monument with their inscriptions

The dimensions of the monument

== References and sources ==
=== References ===
==== Books ====
- Chibani, Kamel (2015). Si Batna m'était contée 1844 - 1962. Batna: A Guerfi.
- Marin, Jean-Pierre (2005). Au forgeron de Batna.
