= Rachid Mouffouk =

Algerian sculptor (born 1955)

Rachid Mouffouk R. K.
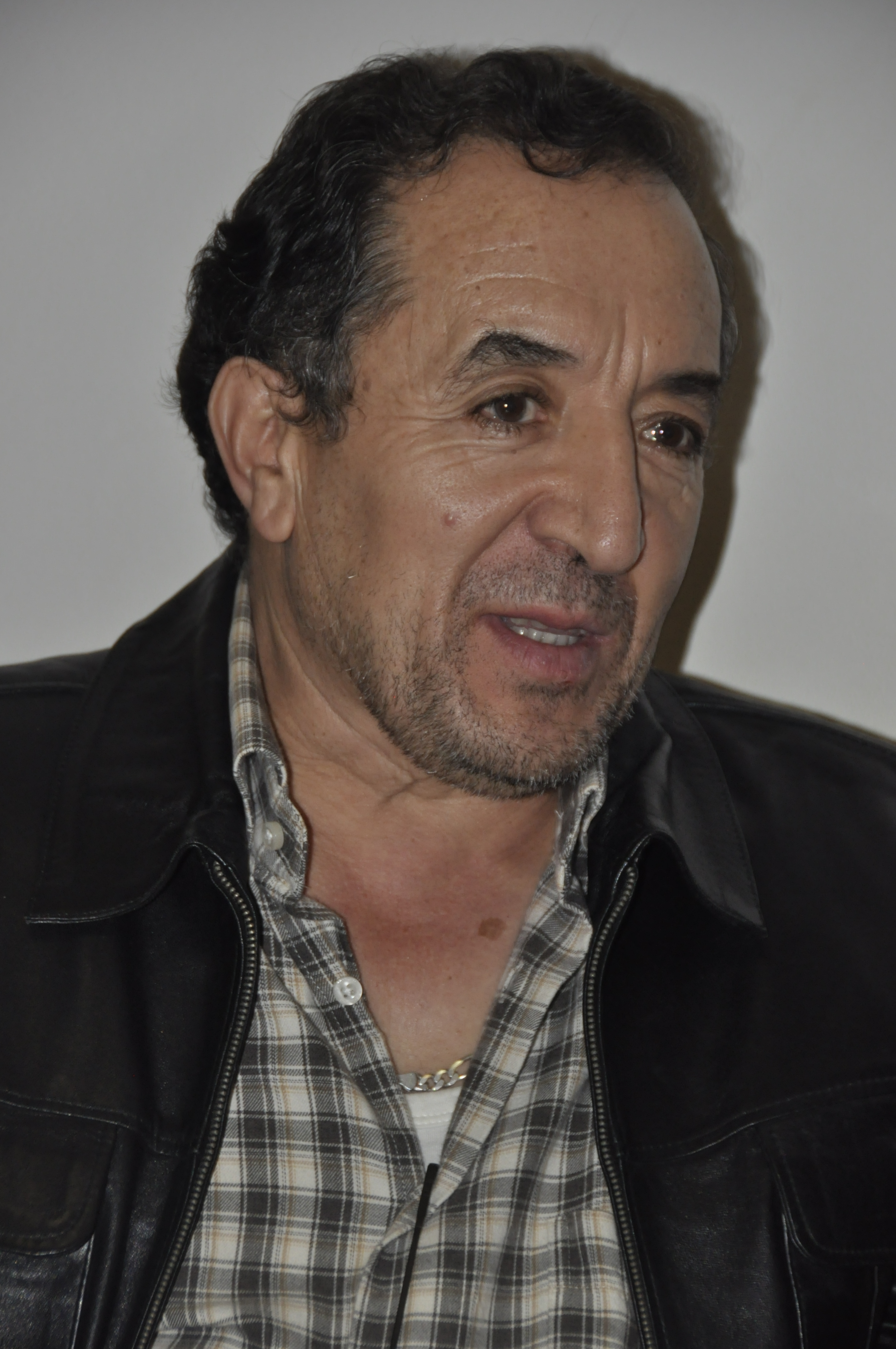
- Rachid Mouffouk in December 2014
- Born: 29 January 1955 (age 71); Batna, Algeria
- Known for: Sculpture
- Style: Recuperation

Rachid Mouffouk (born 29 January 1955) is an Algerian sculptor.

== Early life and background ==
Rachid was born the 29 January 1955 in Batna with his twin brother. Being very small and physically weak, his family believed that he would not survive because of it. He began attending primary school in 1962. Rachid started to learn to paint in his youth without going to the Schools of Fine Arts.

=== Work ===
Mouffouk's first sculpture was that of Diana, the goddess of hunting in Roman mythology, on a piece of wood that sculptor Mohamed Houfani gave to him. Before the Algerian Civil War the artist took a break of 20 years. He worked as a welder for an American company based in Algeria, where he exhibited his work at the construction site. The company director offered him a chance to expose his sculpture at the site.

In November 2006, Amokrane Hocine released the novel Le fou et le muet; the photo of the cover was provided by Rachid Mouffouk, featuring his two sculptures "Le fou" and "écologie". In 2010 Rashid lost the use of his three fingers of the right hand, which he uses for his creations. in an accident that occurred in his workshop Two months after the accident, Rachid created a metal sculpture entitled Mes trois doigts (My three fingers).

== Attachments ==
=== Bibliography ===
- Amokrane, Hocine; Mouffouk, Rachid (2011). L'Abysse et le firmament (in French). A.Guerfi & Cie. p. 124.
- Abrous, Mansour (2006). Dictionnaire des artistes algériens: 1917-2006 (in French). L'Harmattan. p. 123. ISBN 9782296016903.
