= Ishem Boumaraf =

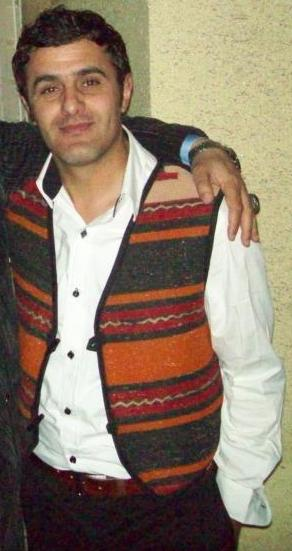
- Ishem Boumaraf

Background information
- Birth name: Ishem Boumaraf
- Born: March 3, 1978 (age 47); Batna, Algeria
- Origin: T'Kout
- Genres: Chaouie, Celtic, Rock, Reggae, Gnawa
- Occupation(s): Singer, songwriter.
- Years active: 2006–present
- Labels: Orphee Music Batna

Ishem Boumaraf is an Algerian singer-songwriter of chaouie music. He was born in Batna and he is Originally from T'Kout. Ishem was an ex-member of the musical group Tafert. He was alumnus and at the real time a professor of the regional institute of musical education of Batna.

== Biography ==
In 2006 Ishem and regional institute of musical education of Batna created the musical group Tafert (Who's translated from chaoui as the challenge). Together released their first album Susa. Their style is a mix of Celtic, rock, reggae, Gnawa and chaouie music.

In 2011 he released his solo album Zazza, inspired by a true story of a young and pretty girl who lost her father murdered in an ambush in the Aures.

In 2014 he released his third album titled Baba Hfouda, in which he pays tribute to the stonemasons of T'kout.

== Discography ==
- 2006 — Susa
- 2011 — Zazza
- 2014 — Baba Hfouda
