= Mohamed Hamouda Bensai =

Algerian philosopher (1902–1998)

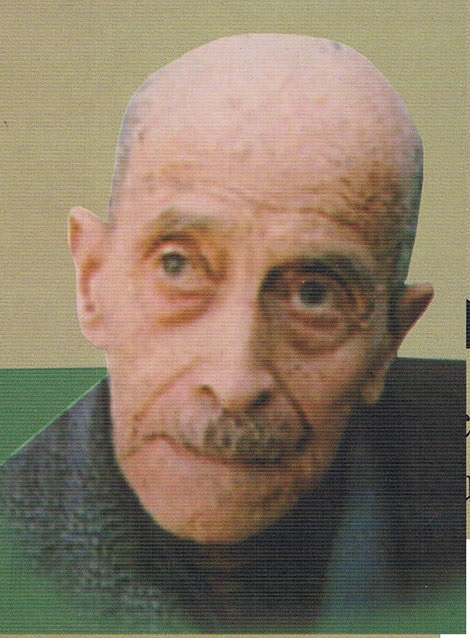
Mohamed Bensaï

Mohamed Hamouda Hamouda Bensaï (1902 in Batna – 1998 in Algiers) was an Algerian philosopher and essayist. He studied philosophy at Sorbonne, and was one of the major Algerian thinkers from the 1930s onward. He chaired the circle of the Association of Franco-North Africa, founded by Marcellin Piel.

The main public library in Bensaï's hometown of Batna is named in his honour.
