= Aurès Aviation =

Flight school in Algeria

Location
- 17 Allées Ben Boulaïd, Industrial Zone Kechida; Batna, 05000; Algeria

Information
- Type: Flight school
- Established: 2000
- President: Abdelmajid Louai
- Director: Derbal Ismaïl
- Website: www.auresaviationacademy.com

Aurès Aviation (in Arabic: أوراس للطيران), is an Algerian flight school based in Batna. The Algerian Minister of Transport described it as

the only school in Africa that guarantees high-level training for airline pilots and small aircraft pilots.

It is also the first private professional flight school in Algeria.

== History ==
Aurès Aviation was created in 2000, under approval number 001 issued by the Directorate of Civil Aviation and Meteorology (DACM), by Abdelmajid Louai. It is the first professional flight school in the private sector in Algeria.

During the first 10 years after its creation, the school was subject to a boycott by the Algerian state, which opted for foreign schools. In 2010, the Algerian Minister of Transport, Amar Tou, decided to train the pilots of Algerian commercial airlines within Aurès Aviation. In the same year, the companies Tassili Airlines and Air Algérie signed a contract with the school for the training of their pilots.

== Location ==
The headquarters of Aurès Aviation is located in Kechida, with courses taught in the industrial zone of the city.

== Facilities ==
Aurès Aviation has its own residence to accommodate all its students. The hangars for the aircraft are rented from the management of the Batna Airport. The Aurès Aviation fleet consists of ten aircraft, including Piper PA-38, Piper Arrow PA-28, Cessna 150, and Cessna 340. Aurès Aviation has the first ALX flight simulator in Algeria, delivered at the end of March 2010 as well as a helicopter simulator.
