= Ghoufi =

Algerian historic settlement

Coordinates: 35.0492°N 6.1673°E

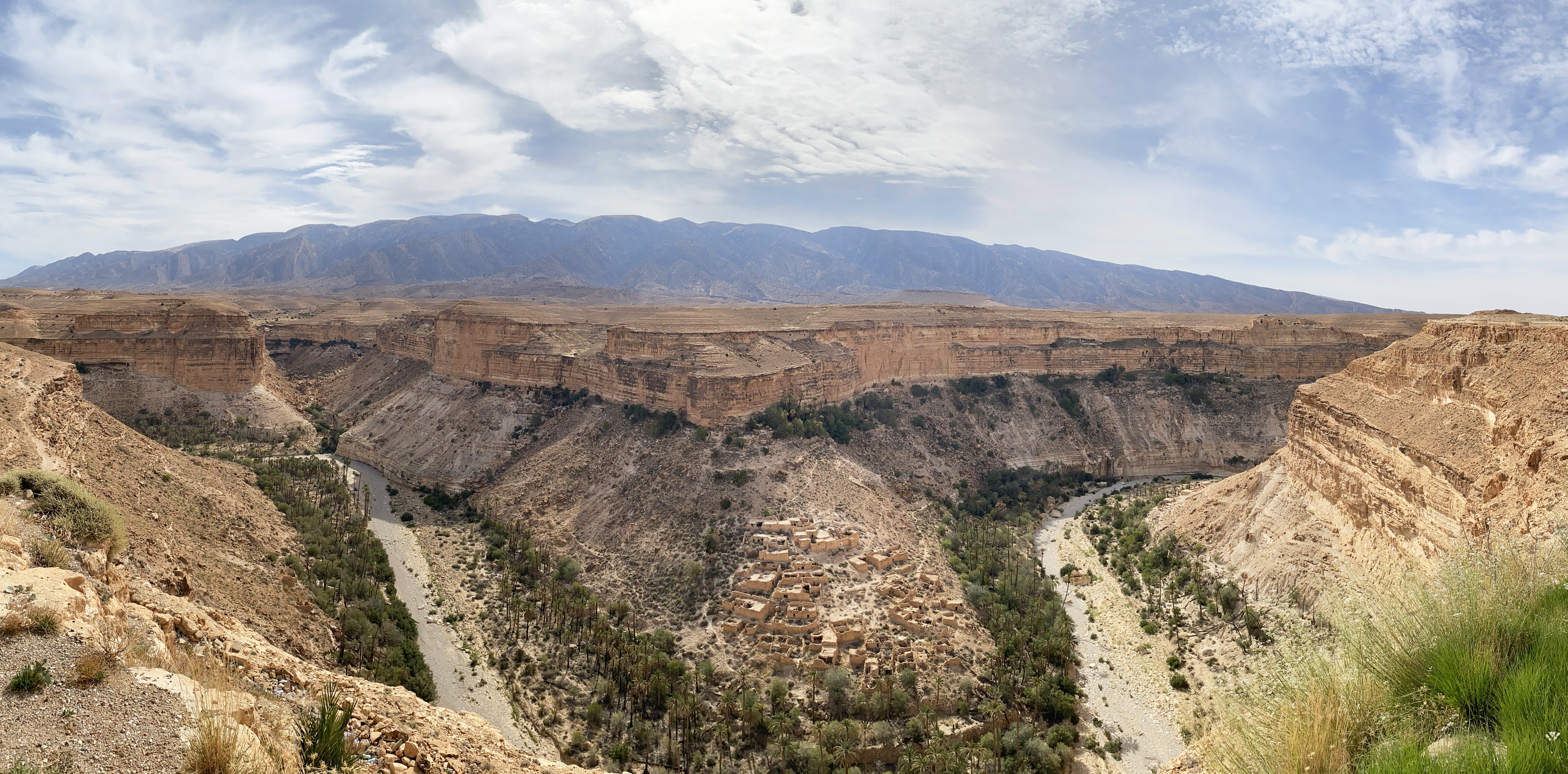
Ghoufi Canyon.

Ghoufi, also known as the Rhoufi, Balconies of Ghoufi and the Ghoufi Canyon, is a historic settlement and tourist site in the village of T'kout in Batna Province, Algeria. The canyon, located in the Aures Mountains and Abiod River Valley, was carved by the Abiod River and stretches for 3 to 4 kilometers. The site is remarkable for the Balconies of Ghoufi, which overlook an oasis.

The Ghoufi balcony ruins include troglodyte homes or domesticated cave dwellings. The homes are carved out of metamorphic and sedimentary rocks, including sandstone. The home are four centuries old and were inhabited until the 1970s. The ruins preserve traditional and indigenous construction methods.

Ghoufi is included as part of the Parc des Aurès on UNESCO's Tentative List of World Heritage Sites.

== Geology and Geography ==
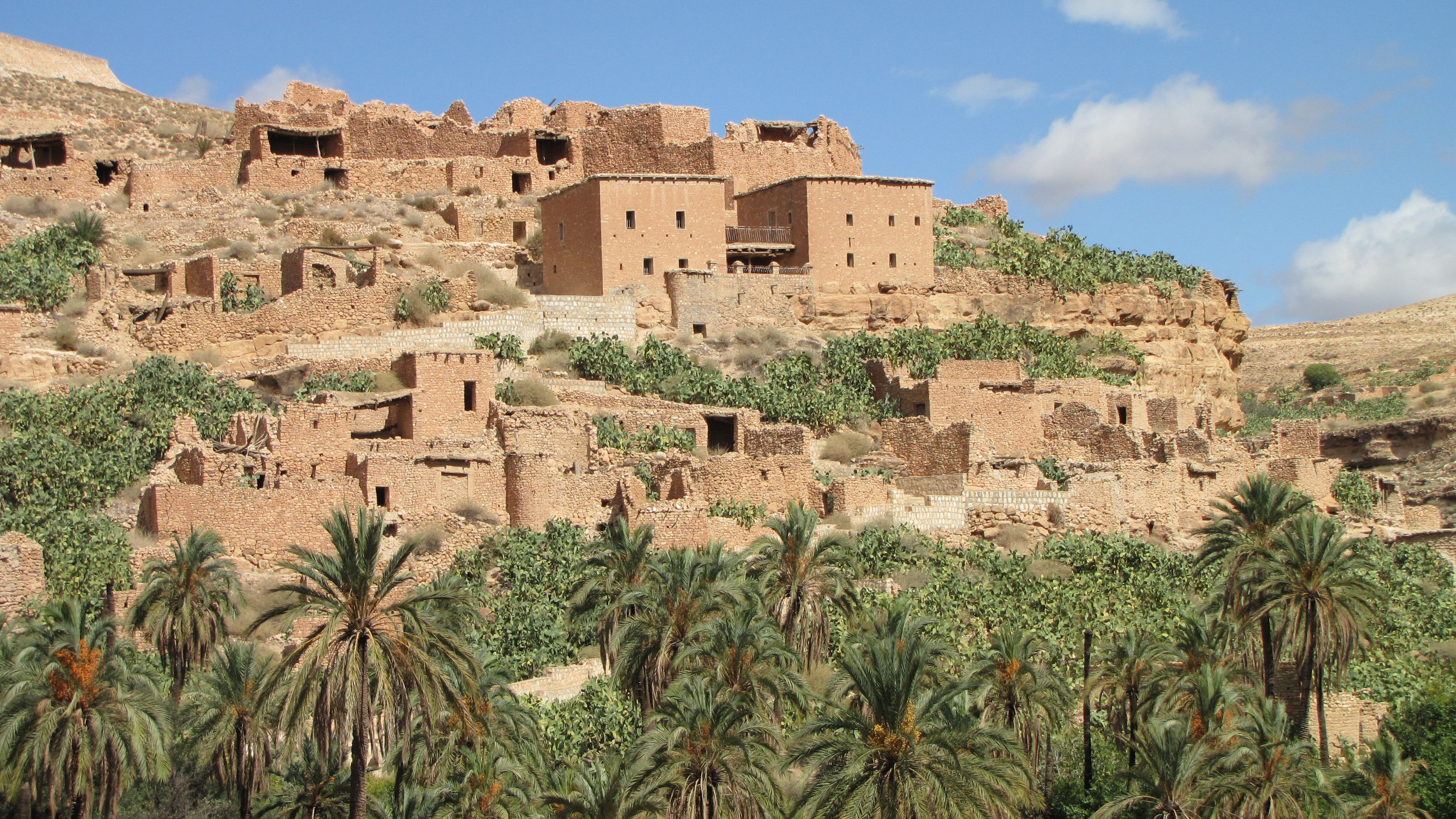
Houses in Ghoufi, 2011.

The Abiod River (Ighzir Amellal) has cut a long canyon across the region from Tifelfel to M'Chouneche of North Africa. Along the route of the canyon, for a stretch of approximately three to four kilometers, one can find orchards of fruit trees and palm trees, silhouetted against high cliffs, some of which can reach a height of 200 metres or more depending on the area. Situated along the national road, the village of Ghoufi is located in close proximity to the canyon, on the northern cliff, overlooking an oasis.

Ghoufi features a number of ancient, uninhabited residences carved in cascades in the rock. Situated in each balcony bend is a village, with a taqliath placed in its middle. These taqliaths are multi-storey buildings consisting of several rooms, used to store crops and provisions. The villages clinging to the cliffface include Hitesla, Idharene, Ath Mimoune, Ath Yahia, Ath Mansour and Taouriret. These dwellings date back to the fourteenth century, built by the Chaouia.

The area possesses a distinct type of Berber architecture, characterised by the use of materials such as stone roughly polished and joined by a local mortar, in addition to the frequent presence of tree trunks and date palms. This is typical of the oases among the nearby basalt mountains and sedimentary rocks, which create the unique landscape of the region.

The site is renowned amongst geologists for the visible geological layers that can be observed on the canyon slopes. These strata provide insight into the geological history of the area. The site is also a remarkable example of the effects of erosion, particularly that of the Abiod river running below.

== See also ==
- List of cultural assets of Algeria
- List of archaeological sites by country
