= Abiod Valley =

Valley in Algeria

Oued el Abiod Abiod Valley
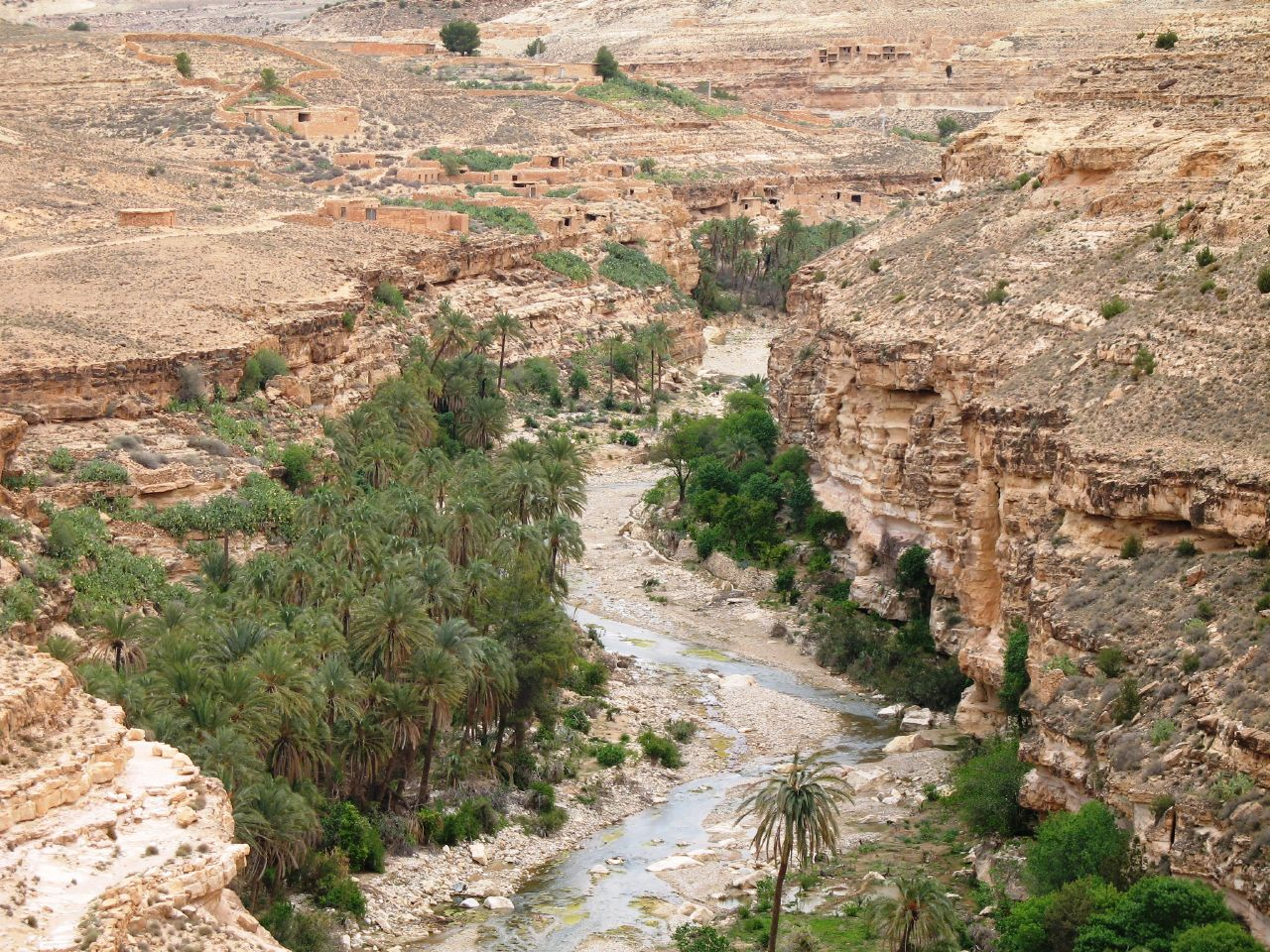
- Abiod Valley near Ghoufi
- Native name: Ighzir Amellal (Tachawit)

Location
- Country: Algeria

Physical characteristics
- Source
  - location: Djebel Chélia
  - coordinates: 35°35′18″N 8°00′57″E
  - elevation: 2,000 m
- Mouth
  - location: Near Tolga, Biskra Province
  - elevation: 200 m
- Length: 156 km (97 mi)
- Basin size: 1,100 km

Basin features
- Tributaries
  - left: Oued Anza
  - right: Oued Chennaoura

Oued El Abiod (English: Abiod Valley) is a wadi that forms a mountain pass in the Aurès massif, located in the Saharan Atlas in northeastern Algeria. Along with Oued Abdi, it is one of the most important wadis in the Aurès massif. During the wet season, rain and melting snow flow into the valley to form the Abiod River. The valley begins at the foot of Djebel Chélia, Algeria's highest mountain, and flows southwest towards Tolga, eventually dissipating into the Sahara desert nearby.

== Geography ==
The vegetation in the highlands on the north end of Abiod Valley is typically Mediterranean with dense forests of oaks, pines and ancient cedars, sustained by the plentiful rainfall on the higher slopes. The southern part is mainly desert with very sparse vegetation, such as oak, juniper, cedar, clumps of thyme, and harmel. The valley has several minor oases.

There are many human settlements along the walls of the Abiod Valley, including Ghoufi. The sandstone walls of the valley are soft and easily worked into shape, so many villages on the valley's walls include extensive stonework buildings. Near the town of Tighanimine, there is a remnant of an Ancient Roman irrigation canal.
