= Belezma Range =

Mountain range in Algeria

Belezma Range بلزمة
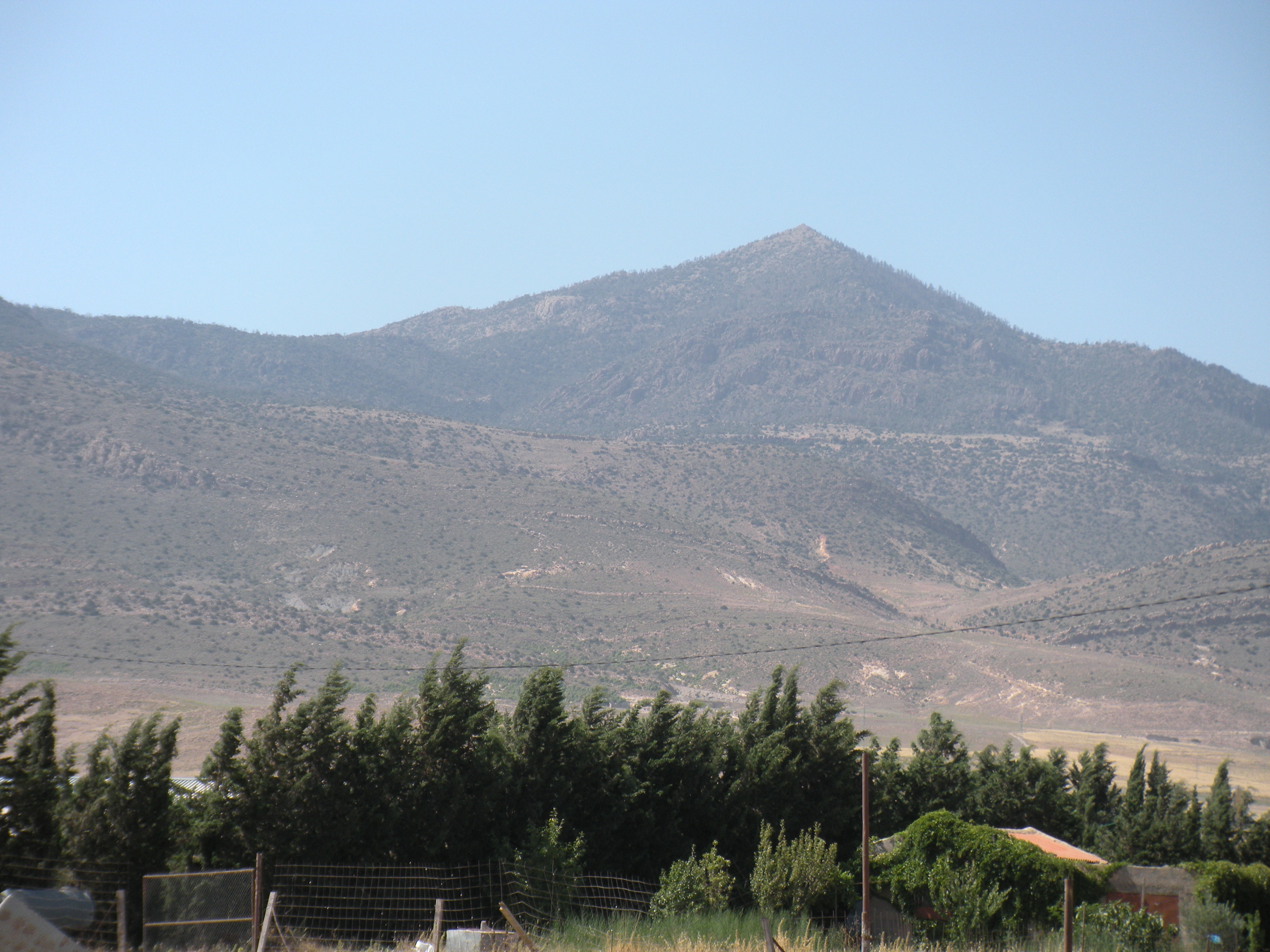
- Landscape of the Belezma Range

Highest point
- Peak: Djebel Refâa
- Elevation: 2,178 m (7,146 ft)
- Coordinates: 35°40′0″N 5°54′0″E

Dimensions
- Length: 80 km (50 mi) ENE/WSW
- Width: 30 km (19 mi) NNW/SSE

Geography
- Location within Algeria
- Country: Algeria
- Region: Batna
- Parent range: Aurès Mountains

Geology
- Orogeny: Alpine orogeny

The Belezma Range, also transliterated as Belzma (Arabic: بلزمة), is a prolongation of the Aurès Mountains, at the confluence of the Tell Atlas and the Saharan Atlas in northeastern Algeria. It is separated from the main Aurès Range by the Batna-El Kantara basin.

== Geography and vegetation ==
The ridge is roughly aligned in an E-W direction. It is located at the western end of the Aurès Range, with the Hodna Mountains to the west. The highest peak, at 2,178 meters (7,146 ft), is the Djebel Refâa. Other important peaks are 2,136-metre (7,008 ft) high Djebel Tichaou and 2,090 metres (6,860 ft) Djebel Touggourt (meaning 'Cedar Peak').

The Belezma Range has one of the most important natural Atlas Cedar forests of Algeria. It is qualified as a 'dry facies' pure forest owing to its location and the influence of the large deserts nearby, being located only 40 kilometres (25 mi) north of the El Kantara gorges, and there has been a high mortality of the trees in recent times.

The Belezma mountains have been traditionally inhabited by the Houaras Chaoui people. There is very low population density in the area and villages are few.

=== Belezma Plain ===
The Belezma Plain (French: Plaine de Belezma) is an elevated intermontane basin located to the Northwest between the area of the National Park and Mount Mestaoua. Its main town is Merouana at 1,012 metres (3,320 ft) over sea level. The plain is one of the most fertile areas in the region and has traditionally been a granary for the local population. Mount Mestaoua, a veritable natural fortress, is a historical oppidum.

== History ==
The Ksar of Belezma (35°40′35″N 5°54′09″E) to the north of the range is the site of an ancient Byzantine fortress. The now ruined structure was once used as an observation outpost by the Muslim and Arab dynasties that followed the Byzantine domination.

This massif was the last refuge of Abu Yazid before his death.

== Protected areas ==
The Belezma National Park is a protected area on the slopes of the range. It is one of the most important national parks of Algeria.

== Features ==
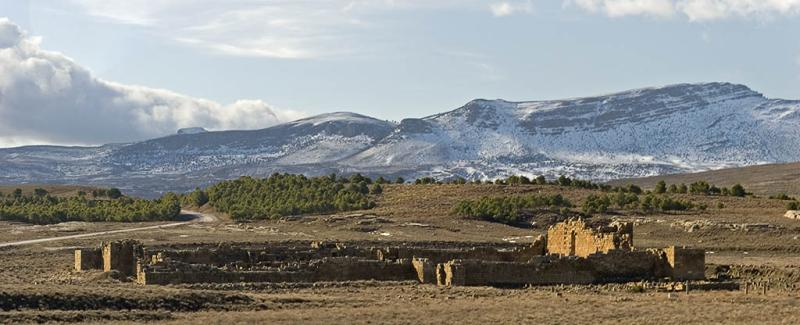
View of the range with snow and the ruins of the Belezma ksar in the forefront.

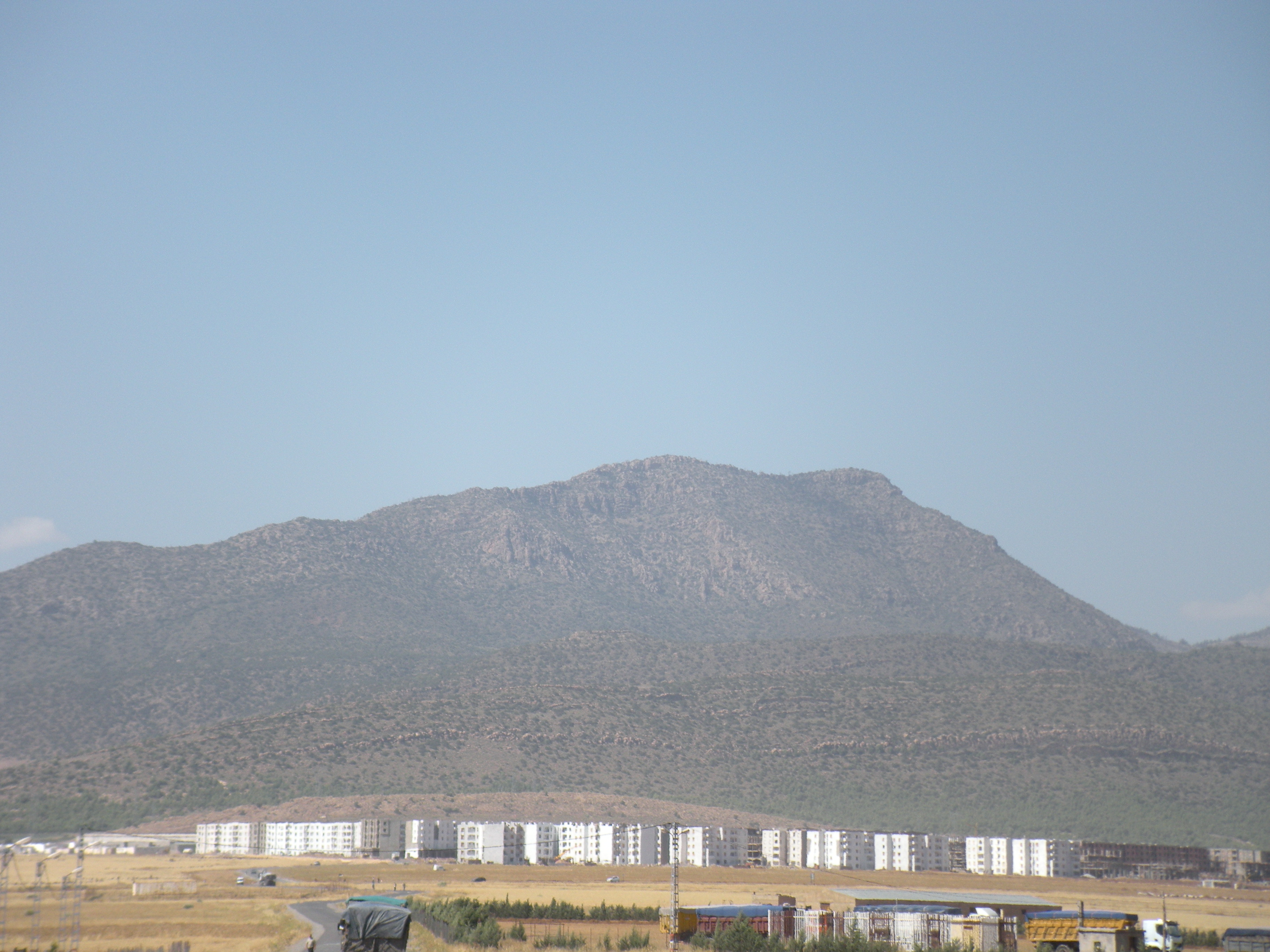
View of one of the mountains of the range.

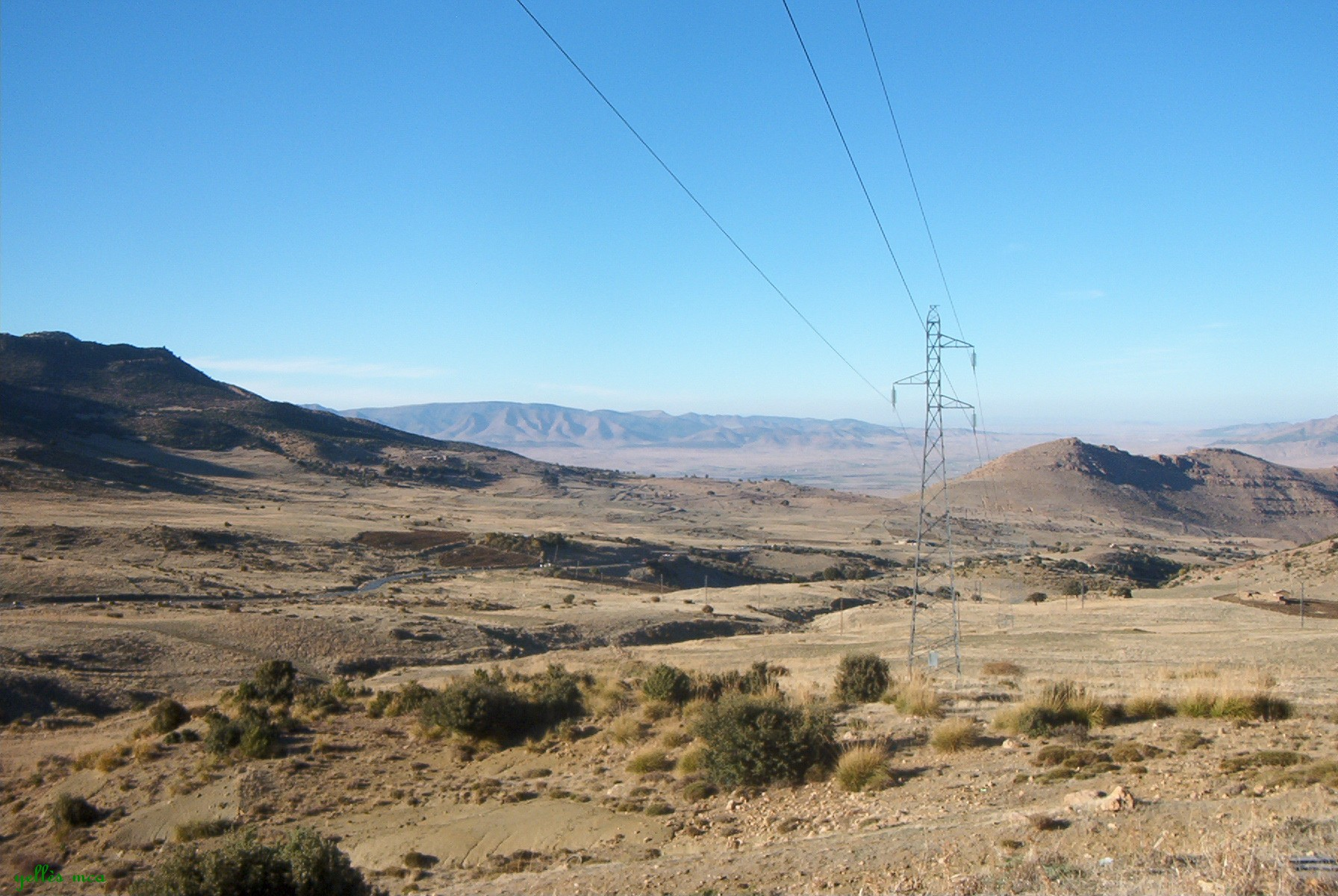
Hills of the Belezma range near Merouana and a view of the fertile plain in the distance.

== See also ==
- Geography of Algeria
- Aures region
