= Batna (city) =

Batna باتنة (Arabic)
- City and commune
- City of Batna
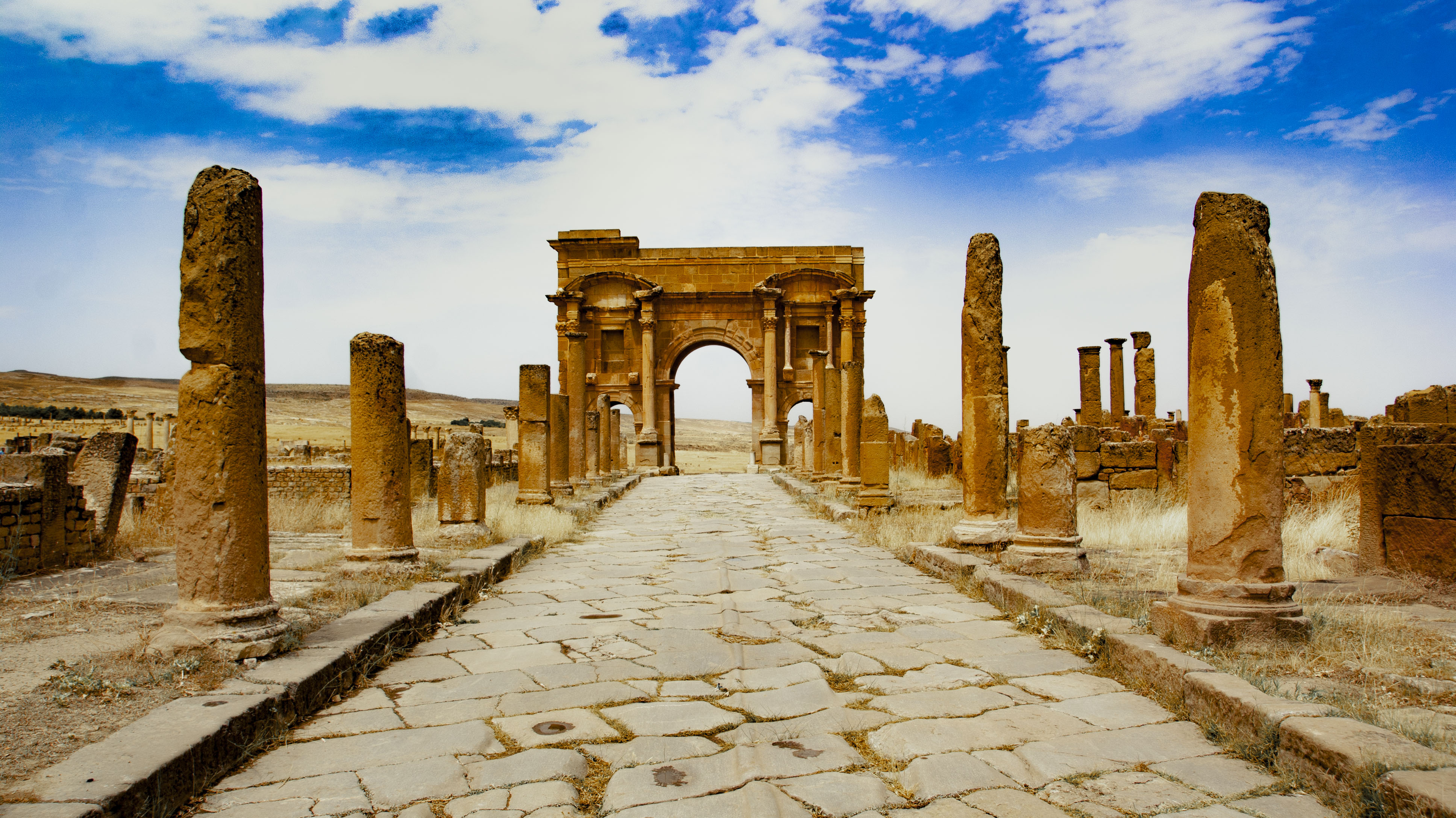
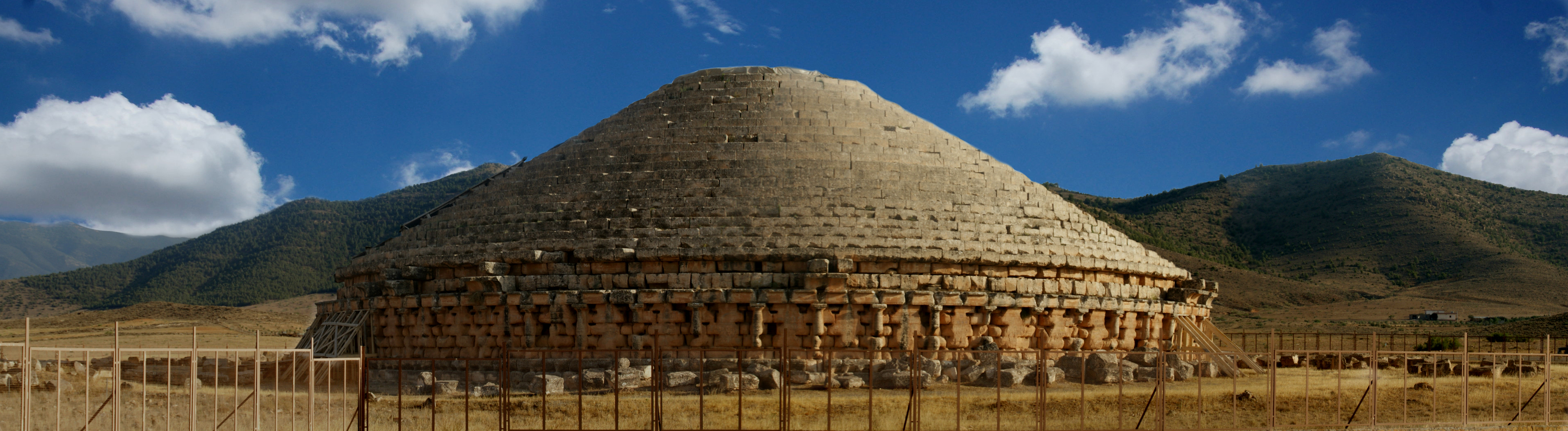
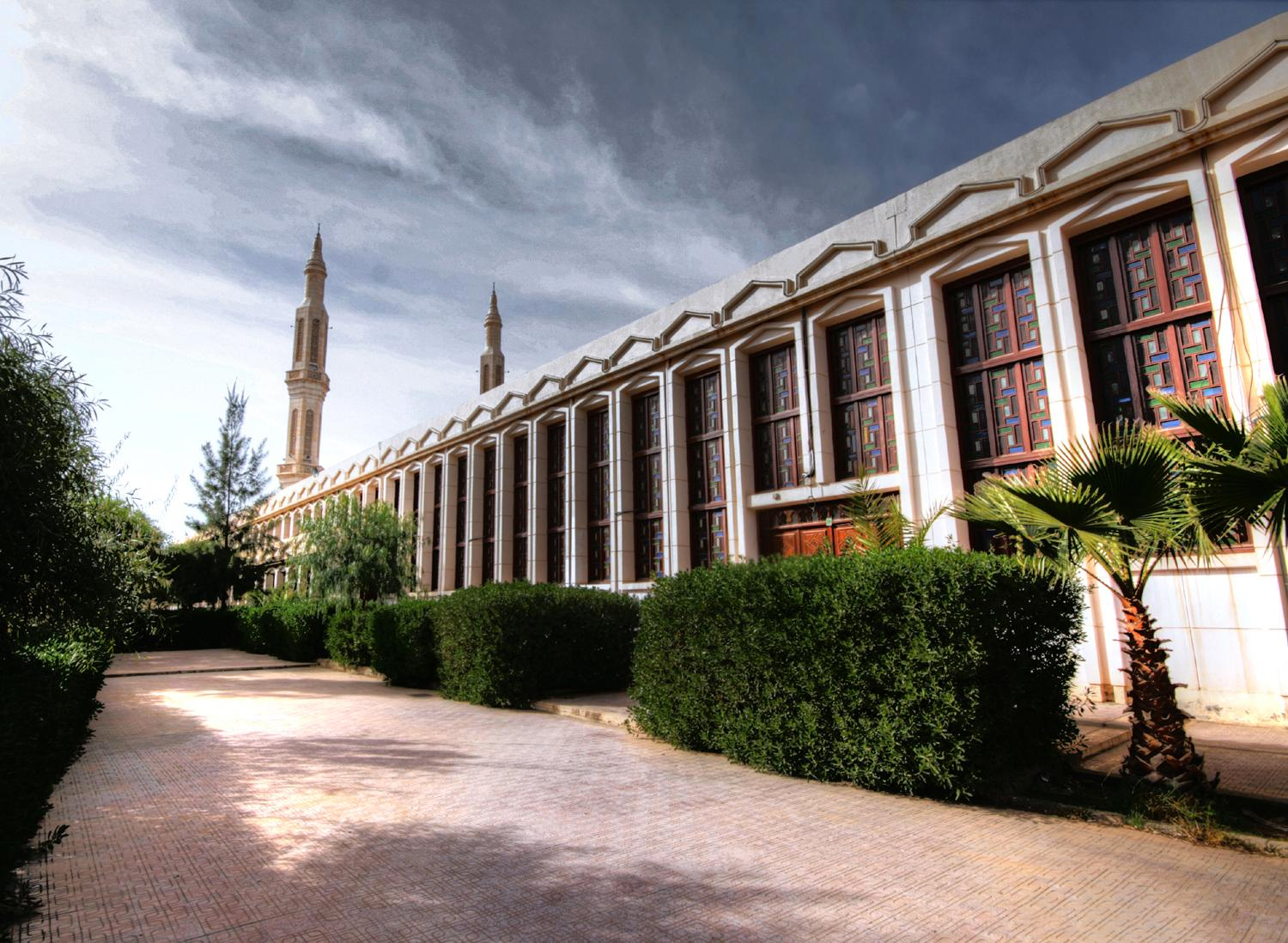
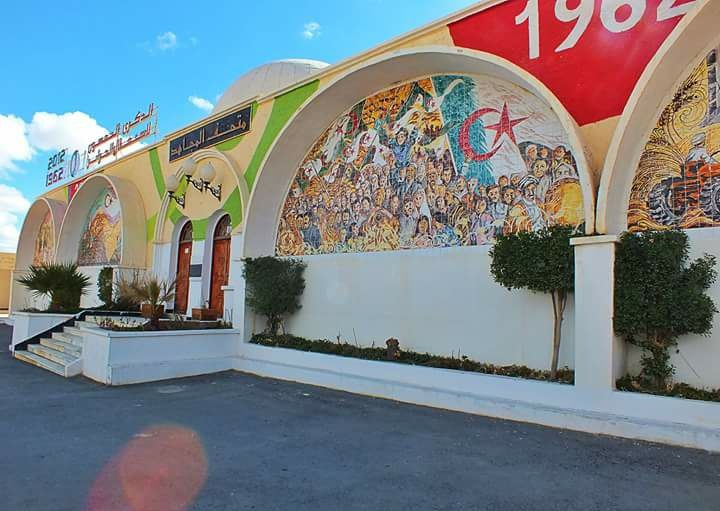
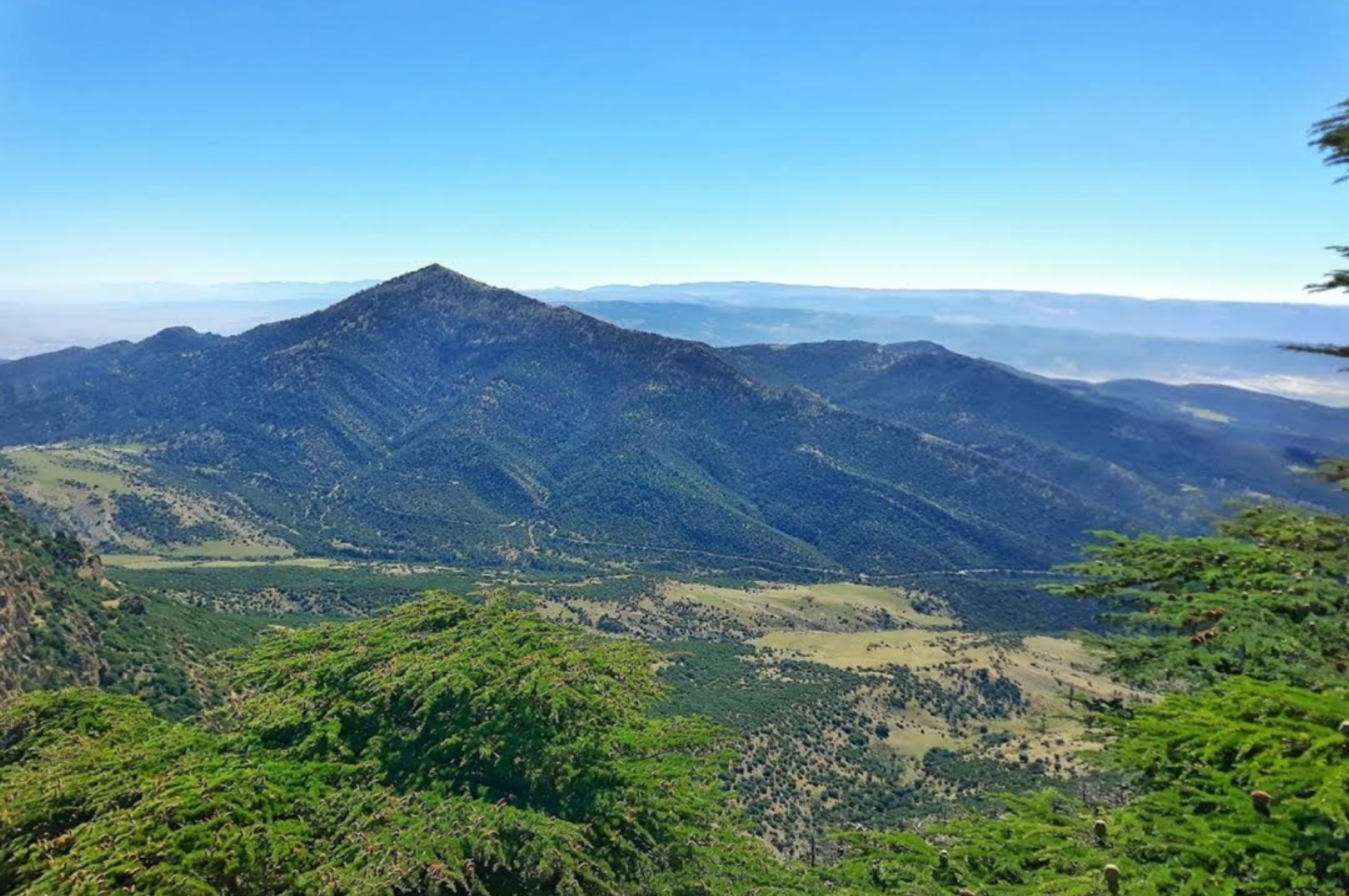
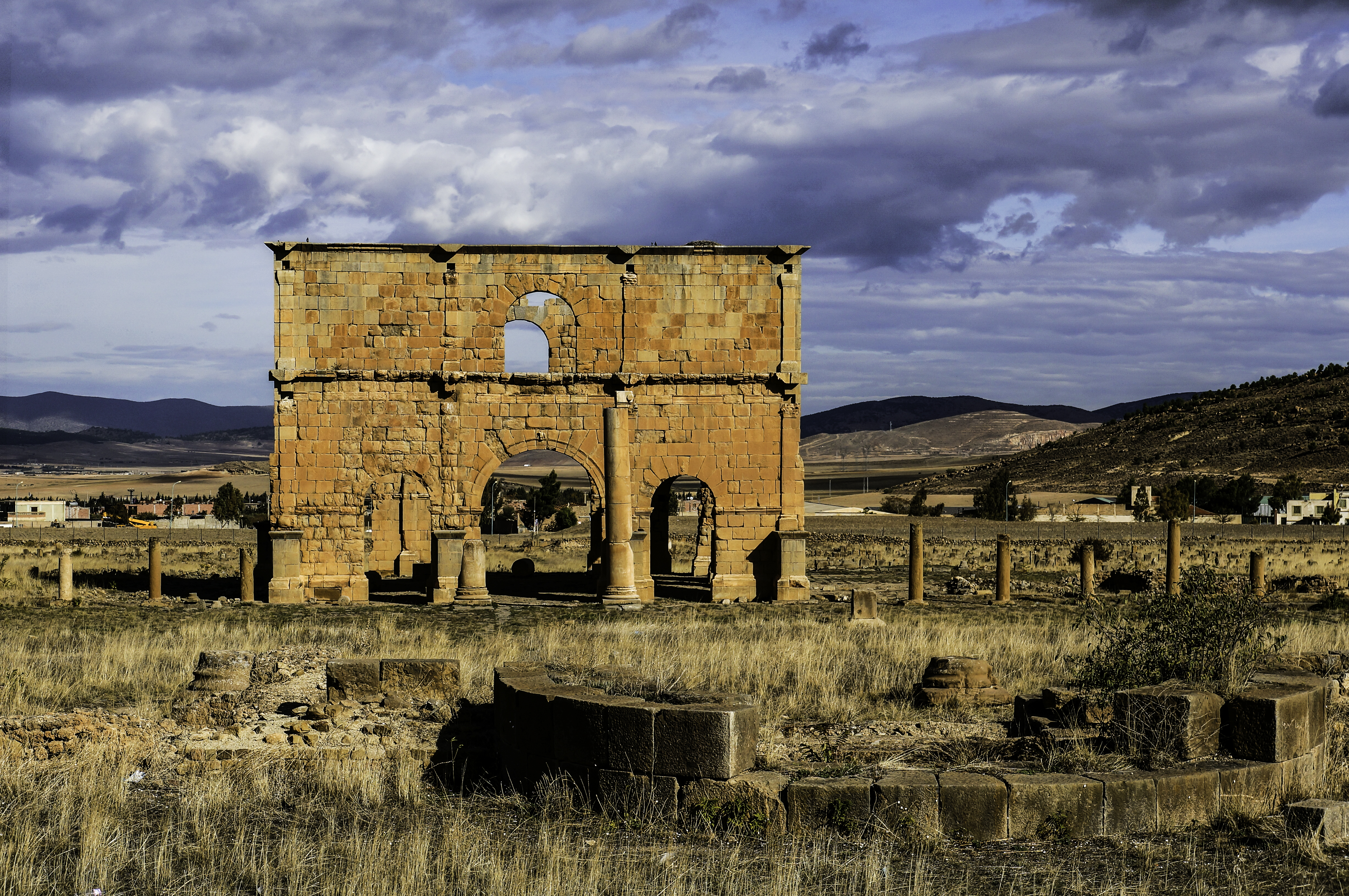
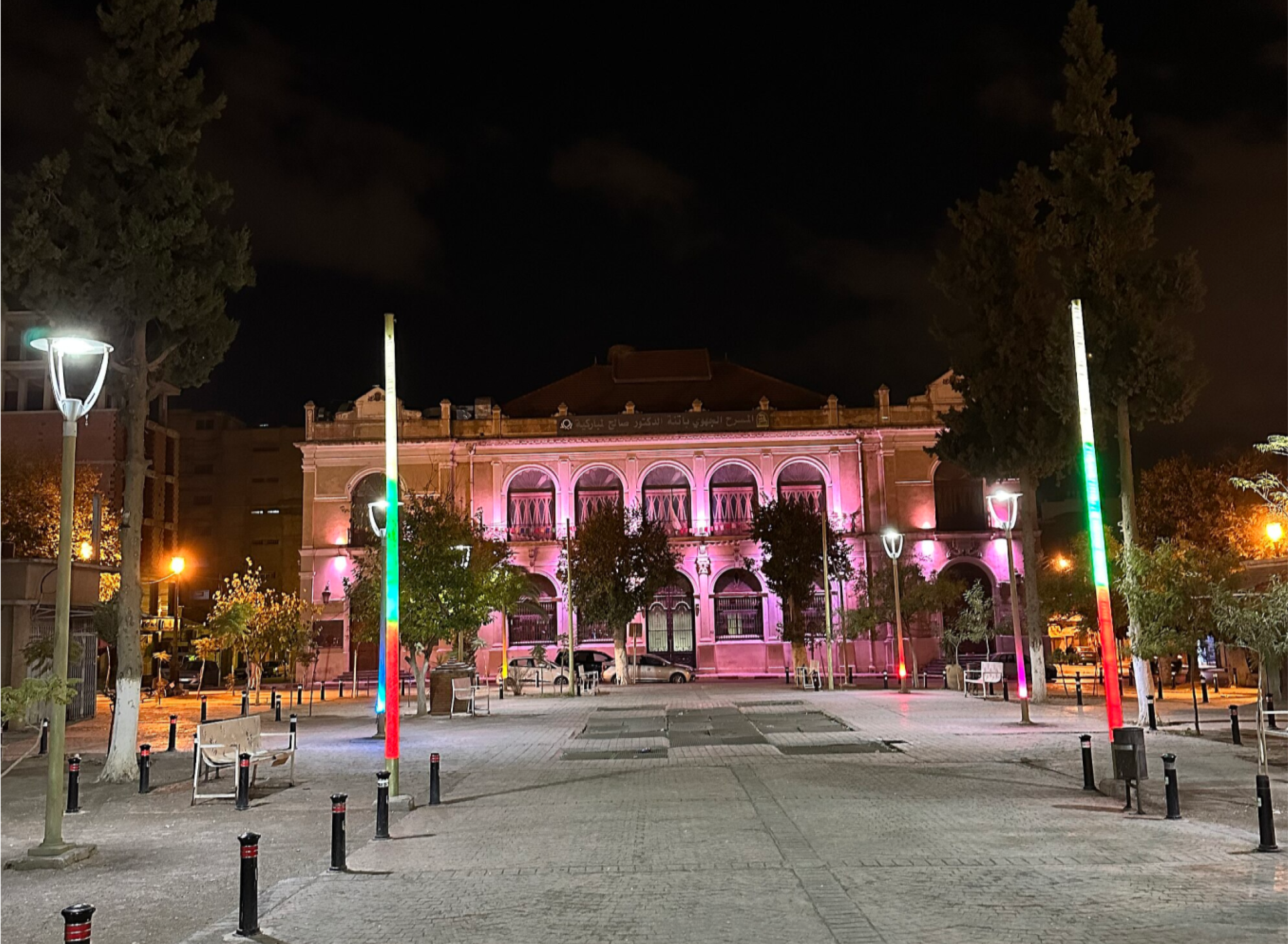
- Timgad Madghacen Great Mosque of 1st November 1954 Moudjahid Museum Belezma National Park Lambaesis Regional Theater of Batna Overview of Batna

- Seal

- Location of Batna, Algeria within Batna Province

- Location of Batna within Algeria
- Coordinates: 35°33′N 6°10′E
- Country: Algeria
- Province: Batna Province
- District: Batna District

Government
  - PMA Seats: 33

Area
  - Total: 85 km^{2} (33 sq mi)
- Elevation: 1,048 m (3,438 ft)

Population (2008)
  - Total: 290,645
  - Density: 3,400/km^{2} (8,900/sq mi)
- Demonym: Batni (male) Batnia (female)
- Time zone: UTC+01 (CET)
- Postal code: 05000
- Area code: (+213) 033
- Vehicle registration: 05
- ONS code: 0501
- Climate: BSk

Batna (Arabic: باتنة) is the main city and commune of Batna Province, Algeria. With a population of 290,645 (2008 census) it is the fifth largest city in Algeria. It is also one of the principal cities of the Chaoui area and is considered the capital of Aurès.

== History ==
Batna was inhabited by Chaoui tribes and there were previous settlements in the area but they were in ruins by the 18th century. The first solid foundations (a military encampment) of the city were erected by a French garrison in 1844, with a strategic mission to create a permanently guarded access point for the main Sahara road. Batna's geographical location offers a natural break through the Atlas Mountains. The ancient cities of Timgad and Lambese, built around the first century CE, are living examples of the importance that the Romans gave to commercial control over the region.

=== Signature and proclamation of the Algerian revolution ===
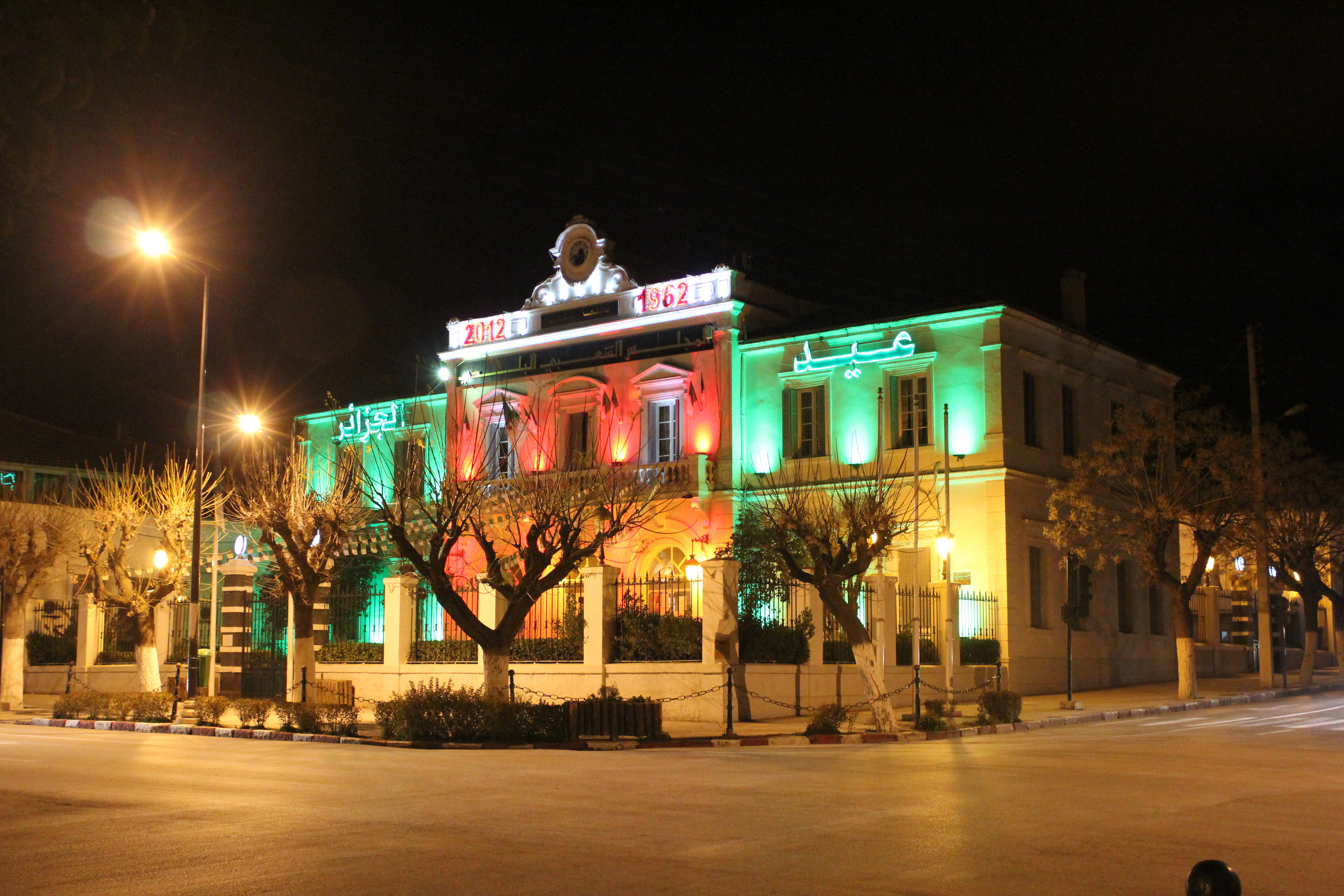
The Municipal People's Assembly

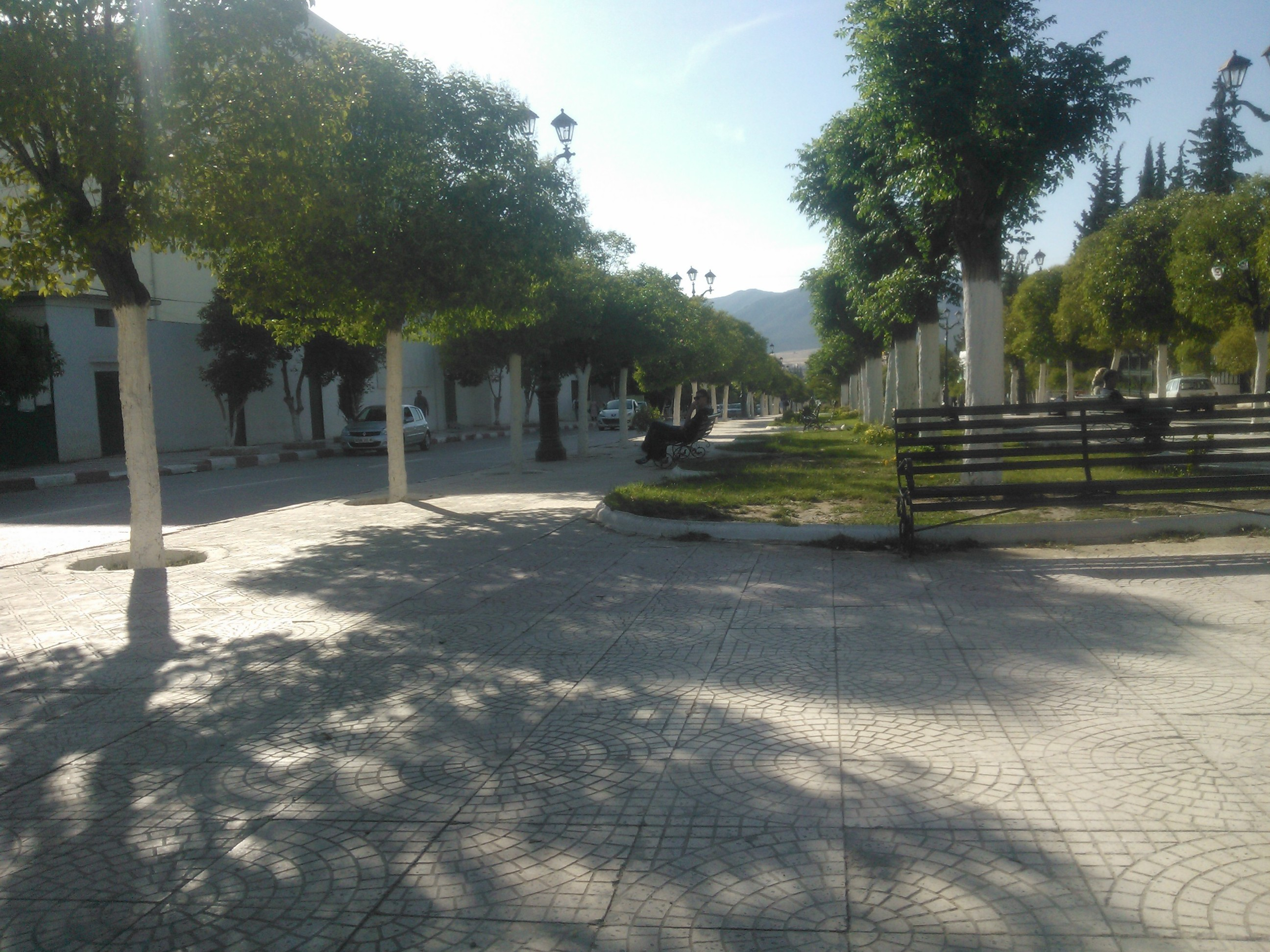
Martyrs' Square of Batna

The inhabitants of the city revolted against the French authorities at the beginning of colonization. Thereafter they organized the Algerian revolution against French colonialism.

The first Batneens adhered to Messali Hadj (PPP), as did the Ulemas Abdelhamid Ben Badis and the Movement for the Triumph of Democratic Freedoms (MTLD), and together they organized the historic summit of June 25, 1954.

The Algerian revolution started at Batna under the chairmanship of Batnéen Mustapha Benboulaïd (FLN). Batna was the first military region of Algeria (zone 1) (1954–1962).

On the night of November 1, 1954, the barracks of the city of Batna were attacked by the mujahedeen. Batna was the command headquarters of the Algerian revolution until independence.

=== Bombing ===
On September 6, 2007, Batna saw a massive Al-Qaeda suicide bombing. The bombing, which took place shortly before the visit of Algerian President Abdelaziz Bouteflika, resulted in approximately 15–20 deaths and 107 injuries as the bomber detonated his device among a crowd waiting to see the President, who was at the end of a three-day tour of eastern Algeria. The bombings were condemned by the UN Security Council.

=== Historical population ===
| Year | Population |
|---|---|
| 1901 | 6,900 |
| 1926 | 10,300 |
| 1931 | 13,600 |
| 1936 | 15,500 |
| 1948 | 21,700 |
| 1954 | 26,400 |
| 1966 | 54,900 |
| 1974 | 115,100 |
| 1977 | 102,800 |
| 1987 | 181,600 |
| 1998 | 246,800 |

== Climate ==
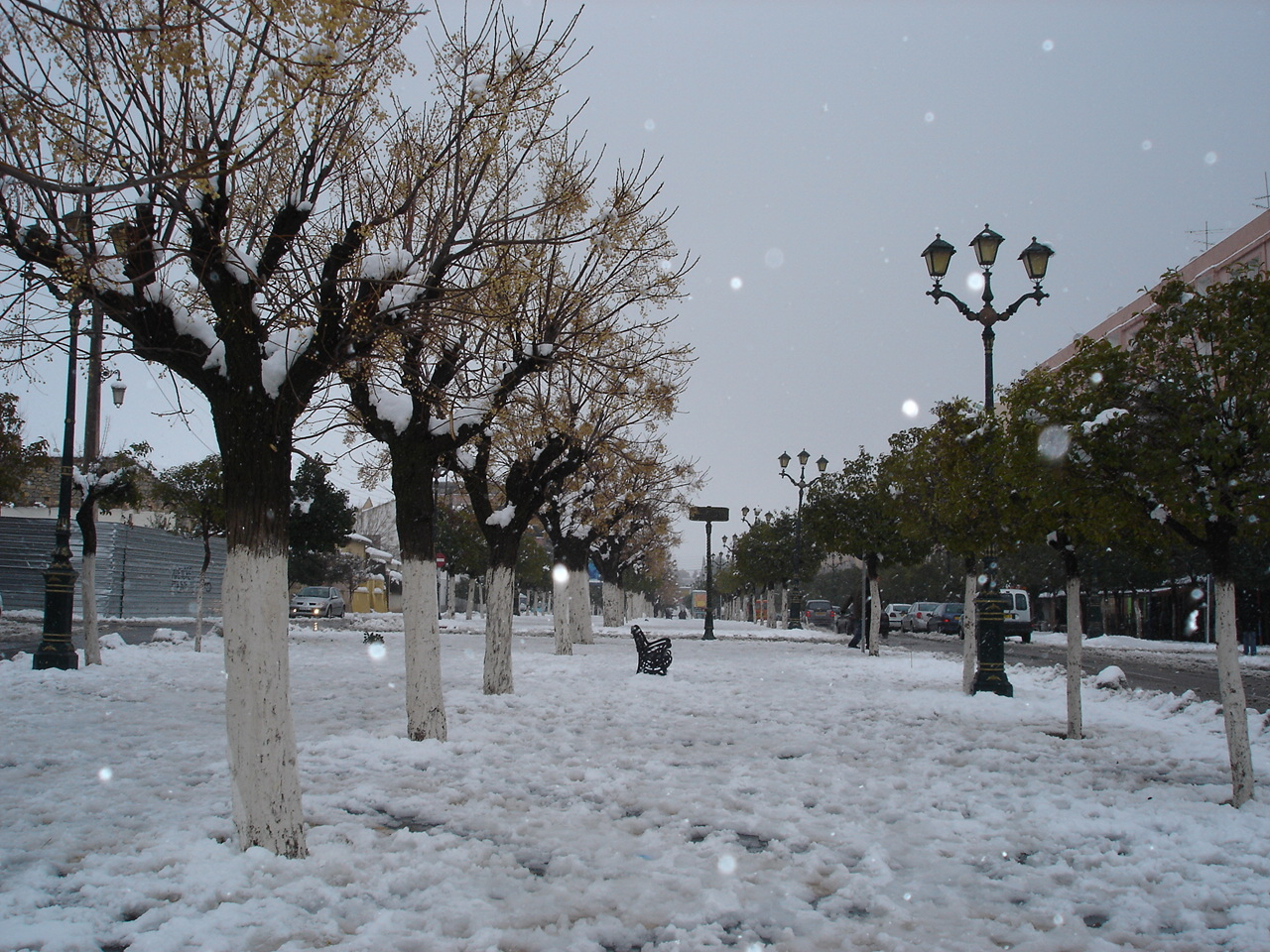
Snow in Batna

Located in the Aurès Mountains (part of the Atlas Mountains), at 1,048 metres (3,438 ft) above sea level, Batna has a cold semi-arid climate (Köppen climate classification BSk) with Mediterranean influences and an average annual precipitation of 326 millimetres (12.8 in). Summers are moderately hot (by Saharan standards) and dry and winters are chilly and wetter, with the possibility of snowfall.

Climate data for Batna
| Month | Jan | Feb | Mar | Apr | May | Jun | Jul | Aug | Sep | Oct | Nov | Dec | Year |
|---|---|---|---|---|---|---|---|---|---|---|---|---|---|
| Mean daily maximum °C (°F) | 9.8 (49.6) | 11.2 (52.2) | 13.7 (56.7) | 17.7 (63.9) | 22.8 (73.0) | 29.1 (84.4) | 33.0 (91.4) | 31.9 (89.4) | 26.9 (80.4) | 20.3 (68.5) | 14.2 (57.6) | 10.8 (51.4) | 20.1 (68.2) |
| Daily mean °C (°F) | 5.3 (41.5) | 6.3 (43.3) | 8.2 (46.8) | 11.6 (52.9) | 16.0 (60.8) | 21.7 (71.1) | 24.9 (76.8) | 24.3 (75.7) | 20.1 (68.2) | 14.5 (58.1) | 9.1 (48.4) | 6.2 (43.2) | 14.0 (57.2) |
| Mean daily minimum °C (°F) | 0.7 (33.3) | 1.4 (34.5) | 2.7 (36.9) | 5.4 (41.7) | 9.2 (48.6) | 14.2 (57.6) | 16.8 (62.2) | 16.7 (62.1) | 13.3 (55.9) | 8.6 (47.5) | 3.9 (39.0) | 1.7 (35.1) | 7.9 (46.2) |
| Average precipitation mm (inches) | 24.9 (0.98) | 29.3 (1.15) | 38.0 (1.50) | 31.7 (1.25) | 32.0 (1.26) | 20.1 (0.79) | 7.5 (0.30) | 17.7 (0.70) | 37.3 (1.47) | 27.3 (1.07) | 31.7 (1.25) | 28.7 (1.13) | 326.2 (12.85) |
Source: NOAA (1971–1990)

== Entertainment ==
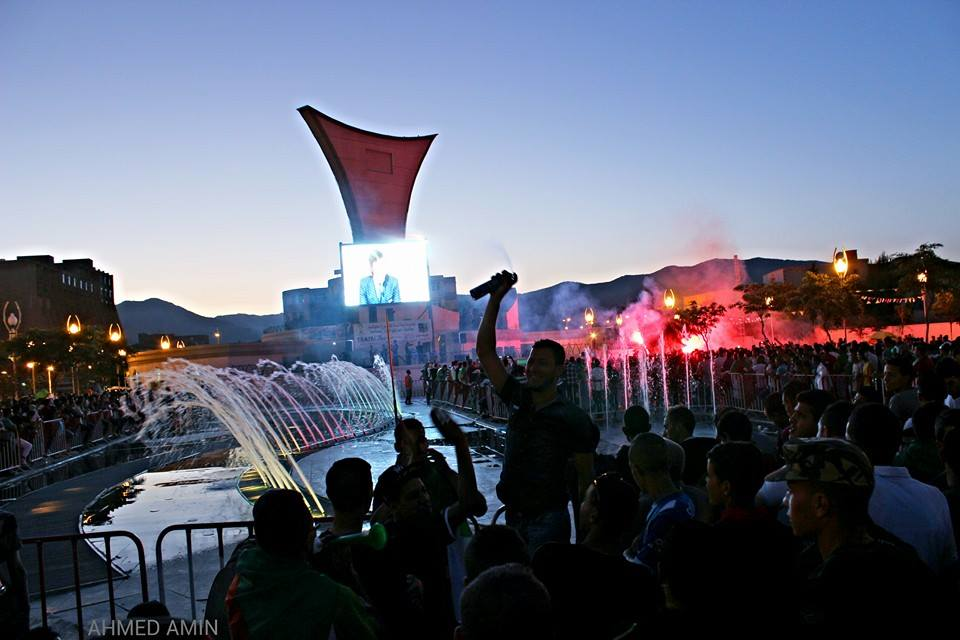
Algerian national team fans at the 2014 World Cup

Many entertainment resorts are spread across the town. Regarding sports activities the most important destinations are the 1st November Stadium (Stade du premier Novembre), and Seffouhi Stadium, which is used mainly for soccer clubs and festivals (CAB & MSPB are the biggest teams in the city), in addition to the Scholar Stadium. For cultural activities there is the Théâtre régional de Batna, and also a municipal Cultural House, which is located behind the Prefecture and covers many cultural and educational activities, in addition to the Islamic Cultural Center in the heart of the city and the Youth House in Cite Ennaser. For children, an attraction park is located in Kechida, which is approximately a ten-minute drive from the downtown area.

=== Dining and nightlife ===
With regard to nightlife, due to some religious and cultural limitations, there are almost no night clubs in the city. However, the existing nightlife is concentrated in the heart of the city, around Les allées Benboulaïd and "STAND" areas, especially during summer break. Downtown Batna has plenty of cafés, traditional restaurants, pizzerias, French and oriental bakeries, and a limited number of luxury restaurants. Many festivities take place in allées Ben Boulaïd area, mainly in the season of International Timgad Festival (usually between 4–15 July every year). The most attractive exciting places surrounding the city are, Lambese (also called Lambaesis), Timgad, Ghoufi, Chelaalaa, and Belezma National Park.

== Administration ==
=== Districts and urban areas ===
Districts of Batna

Town center

Quartier du Stand

Bouzourane

Cité 20 août (20 August estate)

Hai An Nasr

Cité 84 Log.

La Verdure

Cité Chikhi

Cité 800 Log.

Cité 500 Log.

Cité 1020 Log.

Kechida

Erriadh

Moudjahidines

Cité 1272 Log.

SAE

Tamechit

Sonatiba

Cité Chouhada

Kemmouni

El Boustane

Bouakal

Cité Million

Z'Mala

Douar Eddis

Ezzohour

Cité Lombarakia

Parc à fourrage

Cité Zemmouri

Cité Salsabil

Cité Bouarif

Lotissement Ben Bellat

Route de Tazoult (Tazoult road)

Zone Militaire (Military zone)

Zone Industrielle (Industrial zone)

Hamla 1

Hamla 2

== Monuments ==
- Buttafoco Camp Monument

== Sports ==
The city is home to two notable football clubs: CA Batna and MSP Batna. Both play at the 1 November 1954 Stadium.

== Education ==
The city has Two universities, University of Batna 1 - Hadj Lakhdar and University of Batna 2 - Mostafa Ben Boulaid. It also has Aurès Aviation flight school.

== Notable residents ==
- Houria Aïchi, musician
- Leila Ameddah, dentist and artist born 1962
- Ali Benflis, Former Head of Government of Algeria
- Mohamed Hamouda Bensai, philosopher
- Ishem Boumaraf, singer
- Marcel Deviq, French engineer and politician
- Rachid Mouffouk, sculptor
- Liamine Zéroual, sixth President of Algeria
- Safia Djelal, paralympic athlete
