= Aurès Mountains =

Mountain range in Algeria

Aures Mountains جبال الأوراس
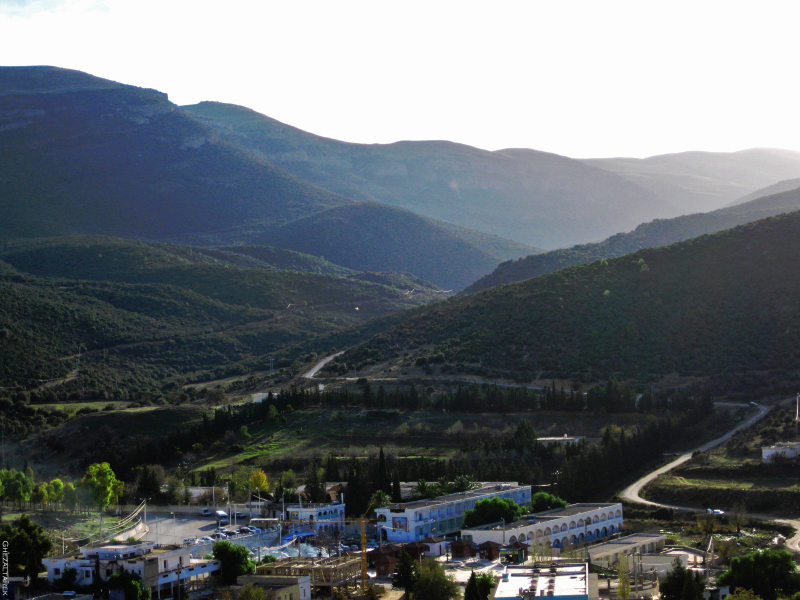
- Mountain landscape at Hammam Essalihine

Highest point
- Peak: Djebel Chélia
- Elevation: 2,328 m (7,638 ft)
- Coordinates: 35°19′05″N 6°38′13″E

Geography
- Country: Algeria
- Provinces: Batna; Tebessa; Khenchela; Oum El Bouaghi; Souk Ahras; Biskra
- Parent range: Atlas Mountains

The Aures Mountains (Arabic: جبال الأوراس, known in antiquity as Latin: Aurasius Mons) are a subrange of the Saharan Atlas in northeastern Algeria. The mountain range gives its name to the mountainous natural and historical region of the Aurès.

== Geography ==
The Aures mountains are the eastern continuation of the Saharan Atlas. The highest peak in the Aurès mountain range is Djebel Chélia in Khenchela Province, which sits at 2,328 metres (7,638 ft).

The Belezma Range is a northwestern prolongation of the Aures Mountains located where the Tell Atlas and the Saharan Atlas come together. Its main summits are 2,178 m (7,146 ft) high Djebel Refaâ and 2,136 m (7,008 ft) high Djebel Tichaou. The Atlas chain of mountains extends over 1000 kilometers in total over Northern Africa.

== History ==
Historically, the Aures served as a refuge and bulwark for the Berber tribes, forming a base of resistance against the Romans, Vandals, Byzantine, and Arabs along the centuries.

The mountain area was also a district of French Algeria that existed during and after the Algerian War of Independence from 1954 to 1962. It was in this region that the Algerian War of Independence was started by Berber freedom fighters. The rugged terrain of the Aures makes it still one of the least developed areas in the Maghreb.

== Population ==
In eastern Algeria, the Aures is a large Berber-speaking region, home of the Chaoui people. The Chaoui eastern Berber population practices traditional transhumance, farming fixed stone terraces in the mountains where they grow sorghum, as well as other grains and vegetables. Seasonally they move their cattle to relatively warm areas in the lowland valleys where they pitch tents or live in other temporary structures and tend livestock through the winter.

== Features ==
Location of the Aurès region in Algeria

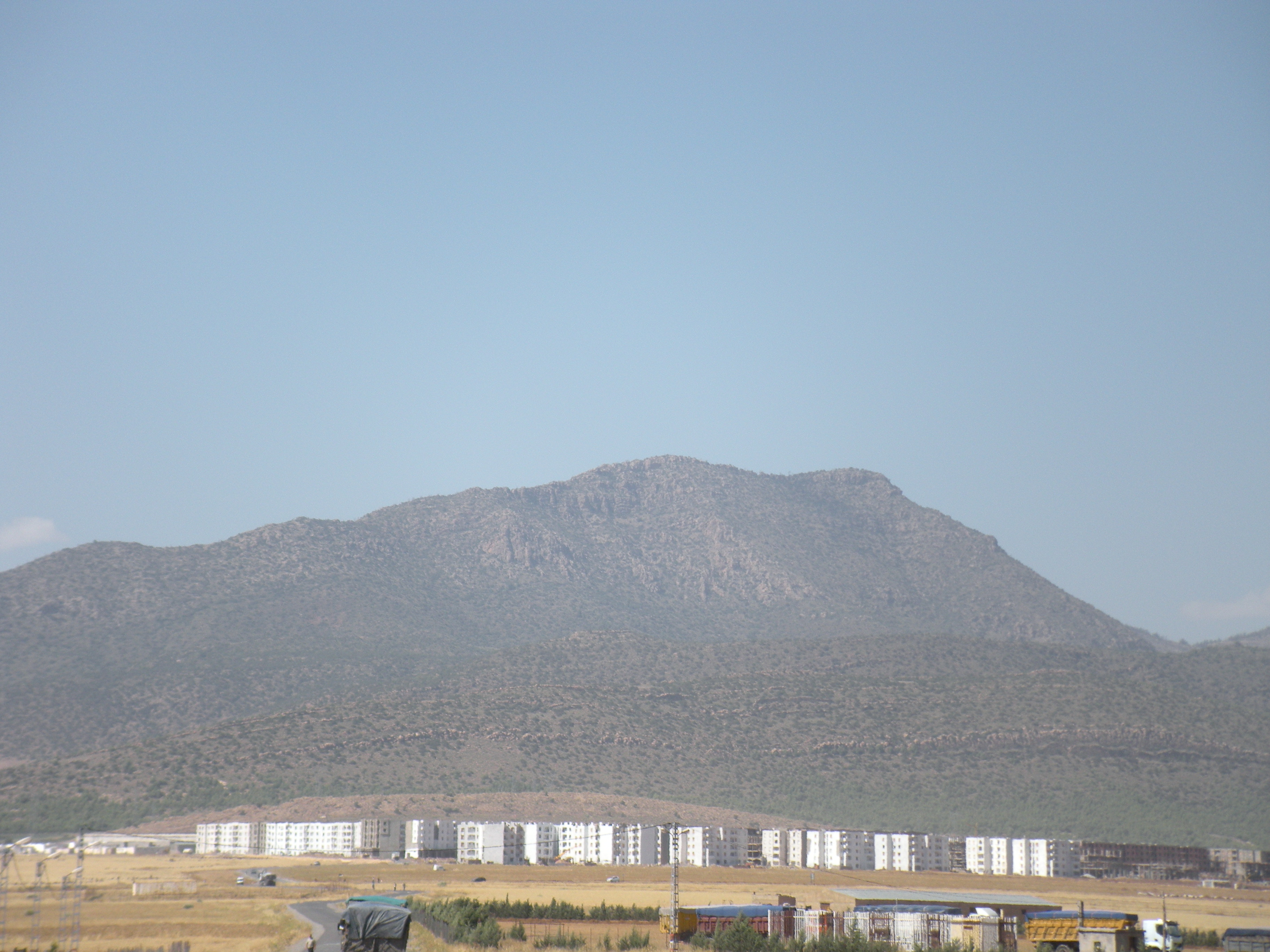
View of one of the mountains of the Belezma Range, a western subrange of the Aures

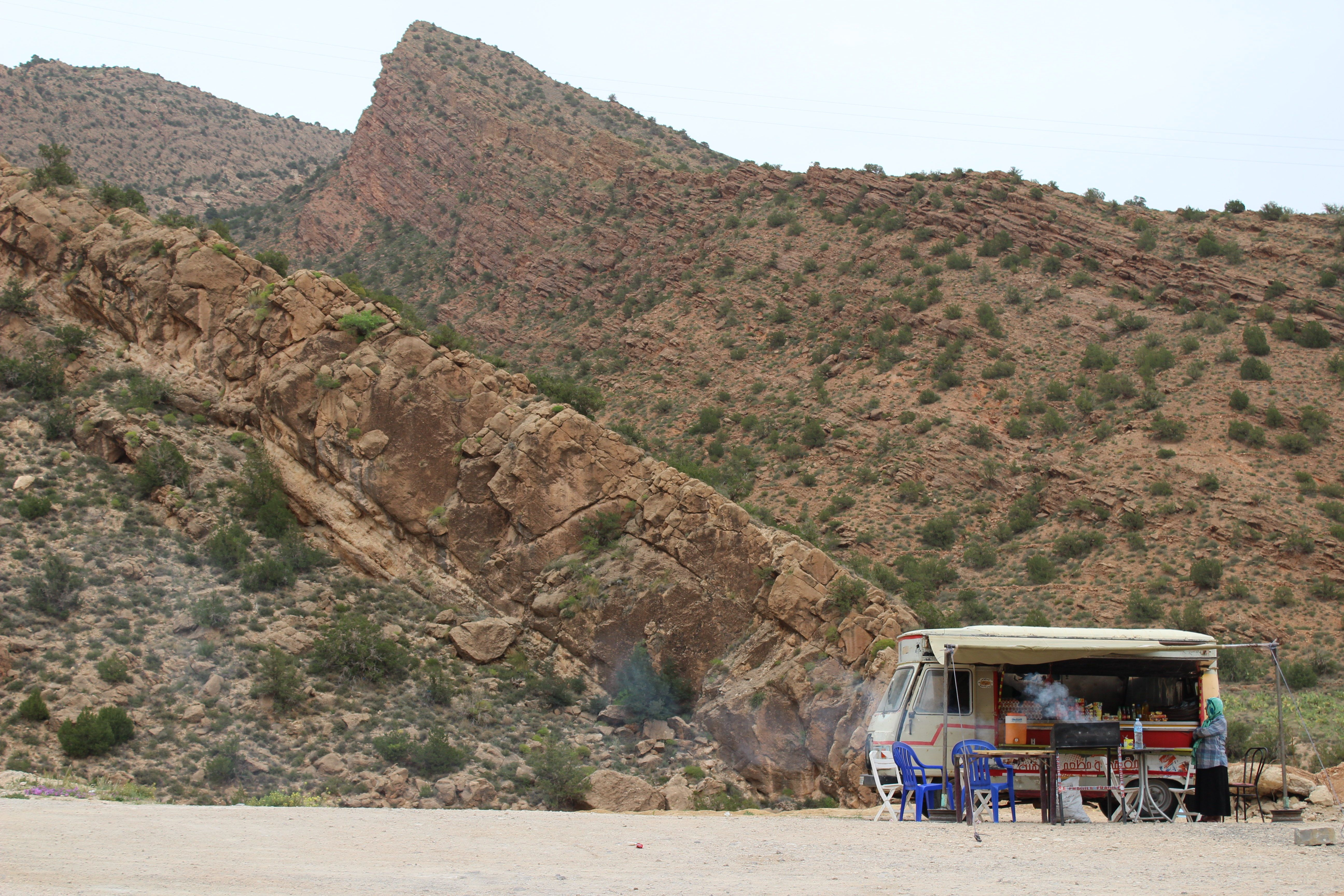
Landscape of southern area of the range

== See also ==
- Aurès region
- Geography of Algeria
