= List of volcanoes in Algeria =

This is a list of volcanoes in Algeria.

Name	Elevation		Co-ordinates	State	Type	Last Eruption
Name	Meters	Feet	Co-ordinates	State	Type	Last Eruption
Atakor Volcano	2918	9573	23.33°N 5.83°E	N/A	Volcanic Field	10,000 years ago
In Ezzane	N/A	N/A	23.00°N 10.83°E	N/A	Volcanic Field	N/A
Manzaz Volcano	1672	5485	23.92°N 5.83°E	N/A	Volcanic Field	Neolithic
Nemours-Nedroma	444	1456	35.07°N 2°W	N/A	Volcanic Field	2.1 million years ago
Tafna Beni Saf	480	1574	35.28°N 1.45°W	N/A	Volcanic Field	820,000 years ago
Tahalra	1467	4813	22.67°N 5.00°E	N/A	Volcanic Field	Holocene

== See also ==
- Geography of Algeria
- List of volcanoes
