= Regions of Algeria =

There exist in Algeria many regions. Whether they are cultural, linguistic, historical, or geographical in nature, none are recognized as an administrative unit by the Algerian government. With regards to the administrative structuring of the country, Algeria is divided into 69 wilayas or provinces.

Here are some of the country's regions:

- Algérois
- Aurès Mountains
- Constantinois
- Gourara^{[fr]}
- Hautes Plaines
- Hodna
- Hoggar Mountains
- Grande Kabylie
- Petite Kabylie
- Eastern Kabylie^{[fr]} (Kabylie of Collo, Kabylie of the Kutama)
- The M'zab
- Mitidja
- Annaba region
- The Saoura
- Titteri
- The Tell^{[fr]}
- Tidikelt^{[fr]}
- Trara Mountains
- Touat
- Oranie^{[fr]} - see also: Oran (département)
- South Oranie
- Chelif River valley
- The Dahra Range
- The Ouarsenis
- The Zibans^{[fr]}
- The Algerian Sahara
- Grand Erg Oriental and Grand Erg Occidental
- Souf^{[fr]}
- Tassill n'Ajjer
- Tanezrouft

== See also ==
- Geography of Algeria
