= West Saharan montane xeric woodlands =

Ecoregion in the Sahara

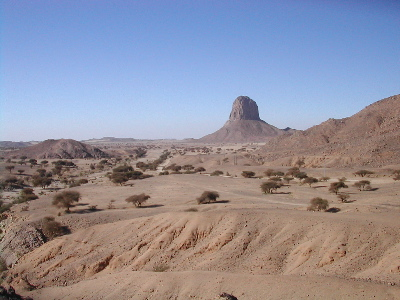
- Ahaggar National Park in Algeria

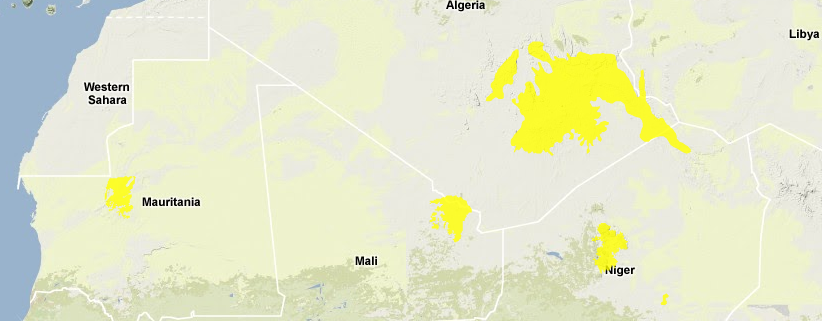
- Location of the ecoregion (in yellow)

Ecology
- Realm: Palearctic
- Biome: deserts and xeric shrublands

Geography
- Area: 257,460 km^{2} (99,410 sq mi)
- Countries: List: Algeria; Mali; Mauritania; Niger; Libya
- Climate type: hot and dry, sometimes extremely so

Conservation
- Conservation status: relatively intact
- Protected: 107,606 km^{2} (42%)

The West Saharan montane xeric woodlands is an ecoregion that extends across several highland regions in the Sahara. Surrounded at lower elevations by the largely barren Sahara, the West Saharan montane xeric woodlands are isolated refuges of plants and animals that can survive in the higher humidity and lower temperatures of the highlands.

== Setting ==
The Sahara stretches across northern Africa from the Atlantic Ocean to the Red Sea. Some mountains ranges (such as the Ahaggar, Tassili n'Ajjer, Tibesti and Aïr) rise up from the desert and receive more rainfall and mostly present slightly cooler summer temperatures. These highlands support dry woodlands and shrublands distinct from the hot dry desert lowlands.

This ecoregion has an area of 258,100 km^{2} (99,700 sq mi). The boundaries for the largest part of this ecoregion, which includes the Tassili n'Ajjer Ahaggar and Aïr (or Azbine) massifs, follow the 'regs,' 'hamadas' and 'wadis' above the 1,000 m contour. This covers a good part of southeast Algeria. These areas reach almost 3,000 meters in elevation. Additional areas further south were included within this ecoregion, including the Aïr ou Azbine in northern Niger, Dhar Adrar in Mauritania, and Adrar des Iforas in Mali and Algeria, using the 500 m-elevation contour.

The mountains of the West Saharan montane xeric woodland ecoregion are found within the Sahara Desert and are predominantly of volcanic origin. They rise from the surrounding flat desert landscape or sand dunes and create islands of moister habitat (guelta) which support flora and fauna. The most important area is the Tassili n'Ajjer Plateau, an outlier of the Ahaggar Mountains in Algeria which supports some near-endemic species and some globally threatened antelopes. The highest point of these mountains is 3,003 meters (Mount Tahat).

Winters typically have daily temperature swings of over 20°C. Day temperatures may be over 20 °C (68 °F) while nights are freezing. In summer, days are very hot, though less so than in the central Sahara. Rainfall is rare and sporadic.

== Flora and fauna ==
Vegetation varies greatly depending on elevation and landscape, in particular wind protection. It is often composed of relict mediterranean vegetation.

In the gueltas, vegetation is very diverse and hosts many animals. Trees may be found at lower elevations, while higher areas mostly host bushes. It is possible to find wild olive trees, or Olea europaea subsp. laperrinei. Endemic and rare species include the Saharan cypress ("tarout") (Cupressus dupreziana) and Saharan myrtle (Myrtus nivellei), both of which are relict Saharan-Mediterranean species. Olive and myrtle trees grow at the bottom of wadis, intermittent stream valleys, or beside gueltas and permanent or temporary waterholes.

Other species with a preference for moist habitats are Zaleya pentandra, Lupinus tassilicus, and Convolvulus fatmensis. Silene lynesii, Senegalia laeta, Vachellia nilotica subsp. nilotica, and Cordia sinensis grow in wadis. Other representatives of the 28 national Algerian plant rarities found on Tassili n'Ajjer include Ficus ingens and Anticharis glandulosa.

== Population and conservation ==
The human population of the ecoregion is very small, with fewer than 5 persons per square kilometre. Many people are nomadic though some small cities also exist (such as Idlès). The vegetation remains fairly intact.
