= Chott el Hodna =

Endorheic salt lake in Algeria

Chott el Hodna شط الحضنة
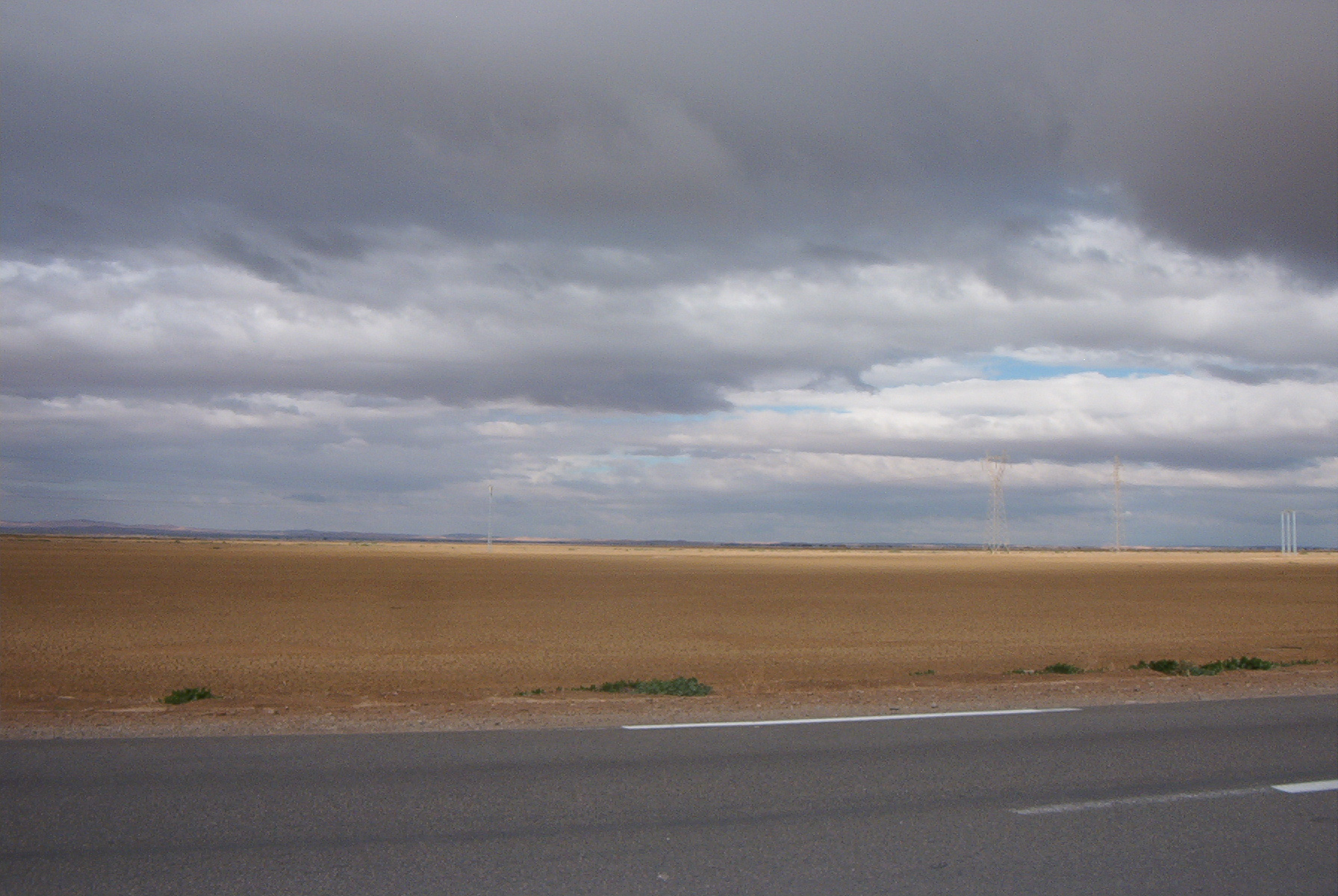
- Landscape of the Chott el Hodna

- Location within Algeria
- Location: Hodna
- Coordinates: 35.44°N 4.76°E
- Type: Endorheic salt lake
- Basin countries: Algeria
- Max. length: 77 km (48 mi)
- Max. width: 16 km (9.9 mi)
- Surface area: 76,000 ha (190,000 acres)
- Surface elevation: 394 m (1,293 ft) above sea level

Ramsar Wetland
- Designated: 2 February 2001
- Reference no.: 1053

The Chott el Hodna (Arabic: شط الحضنة) is a very shallow saline lake in Algeria. It is located within an endorheic basin in the Hodna region, towards the eastern end of the Hautes Plaines. The Chott el Hodna includes seasonal brackish and saline pools and marshes, but the central zone of the lake is characterized by a complete absence of vegetation.

J. Despois argues that the Chott el Hodna is not a proper Chott, but a Sebkha.

== Ecology ==
The chott area provides an important habitat for certain endangered species such as the Cuvier's gazelle, the marbled duck and different kinds of bustards, as well as indigenous fish species. The Chott el Hodna was declared a Ramsar site on 2 February 2001.

== See also ==
- Geography of Algeria
- Hodna
