= Chott Ech Chergui =

- شط الشرقي (Arabic)
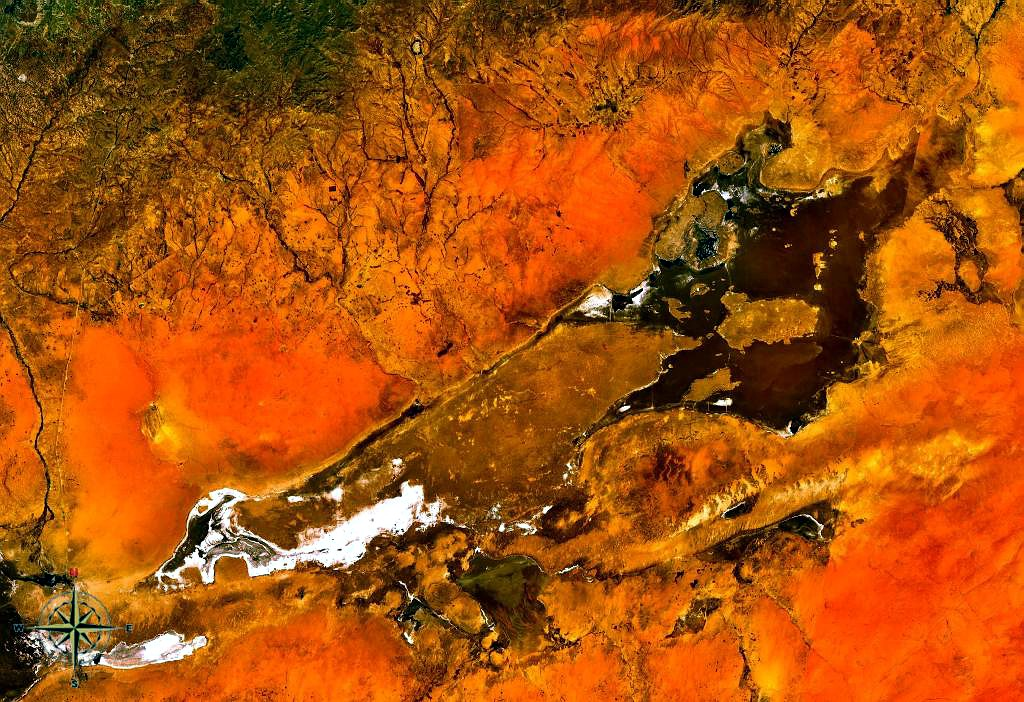
- from space

- Chott ach-Chargui in Algeria
- Coordinates: 34.35°N 0.5°E
- Type: Endorheic salt lake
- Basin countries: Algeria
- Max. length: 160 km (99 mi)
- Max. width: 24 km (15 mi)
- Surface area: 2,000 km^{2} (770 sq mi)
- Surface elevation: 1,027 m (3,369 ft) above sea level

Ramsar Wetland
- Designated: 2 February 2001
- Reference no.: 1052

Chott Ech Chergui (Arabic: شط الشرقي) is a large endorheic salt lake in Saïda Province, northwestern Algeria. It is located at 34.35°N 0.5°E in the level terrain of the Hautes Plaines region between the Tell Atlas and the Saharan Atlas and is one of the largest lakes in Algeria.

== Ecology ==
Chott Ech Chergui has an area of about 2000 km^{2} where water collects during the wet season, forming a number of large shallow salt lakes which become salt flats as they dry. The lake area has a length of about 160 km from ENE to WSW and lies at an average elevation of 1000 m.

Chott Ech Chergui has been designated a Ramsar wetland of international importance. The Ramsar site has an area of 8555 km^{2} and is the natural environment for a number of threatened and vulnerable animal and plant species.

== See also ==
- Geography of Algeria
- Hautes Plaines
