= Ahdid =

Aḥdid أحذيذ
- town
- Interactive map of Aḥdid
- Country: Algeria
- Region: Kabylie
- Province: Sétif Province

Population (2004)
  - Total: 90
- Time zone: UTC+1 (WET)
  - Summer (DST): UTC+1 (WEST)

Ahdid (Arabic: أحذيذ; Kabyle: Aḥdid) is a small town in Sétif Province of the Kabylie region of Algeria. As of 2004, the town has a total population of 90 people living in 12 households.
