= Hodna =

Coordinates: 35°30′N 4°50′E

Hodna حضنة
- Natural region
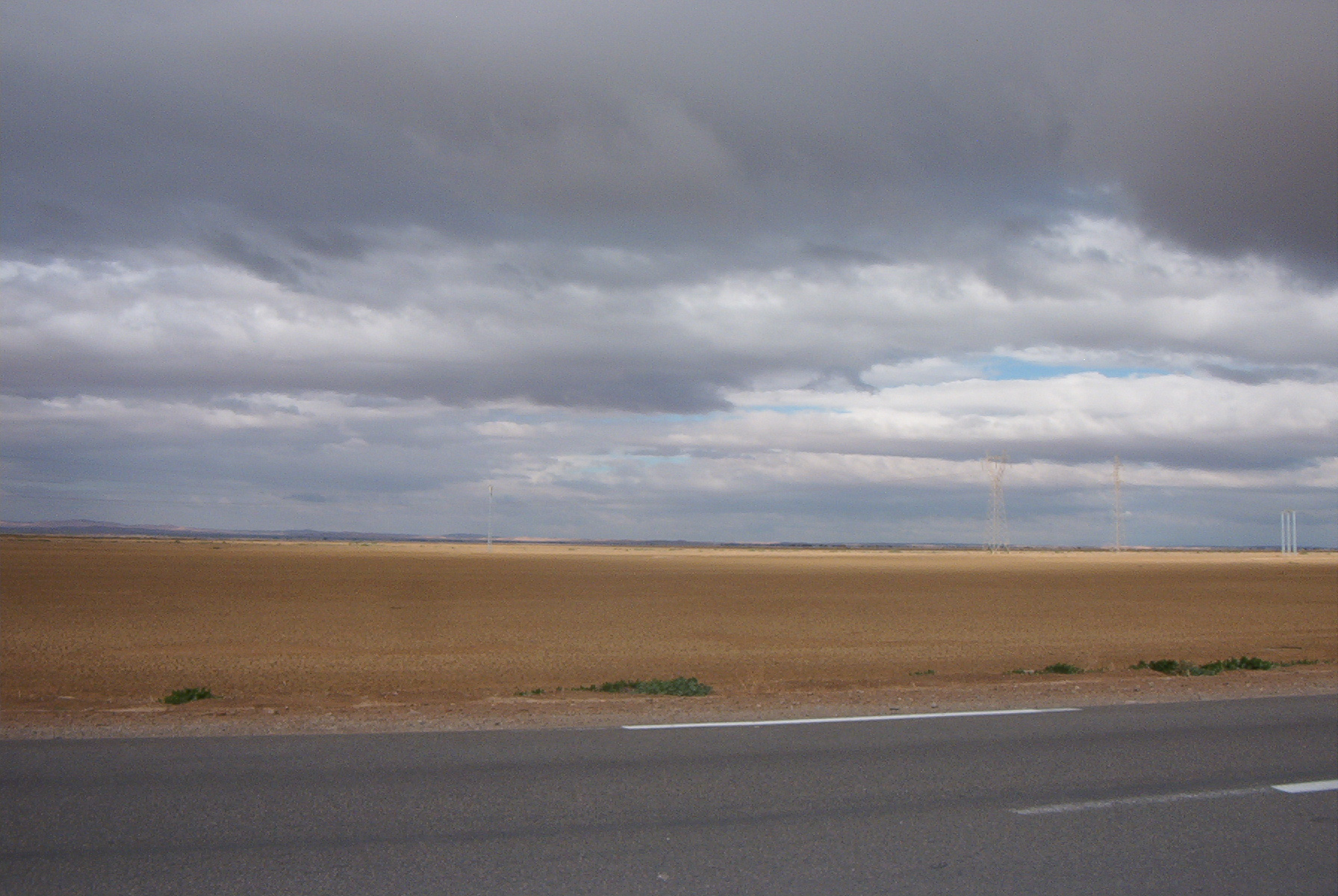
- Landscape of the Chott el Hodna south of M'Sila

- A map of the Hodna region showing the communes of the two provinces
- Country: Algeria
- Elevation: 1,000 m (3,300 ft)

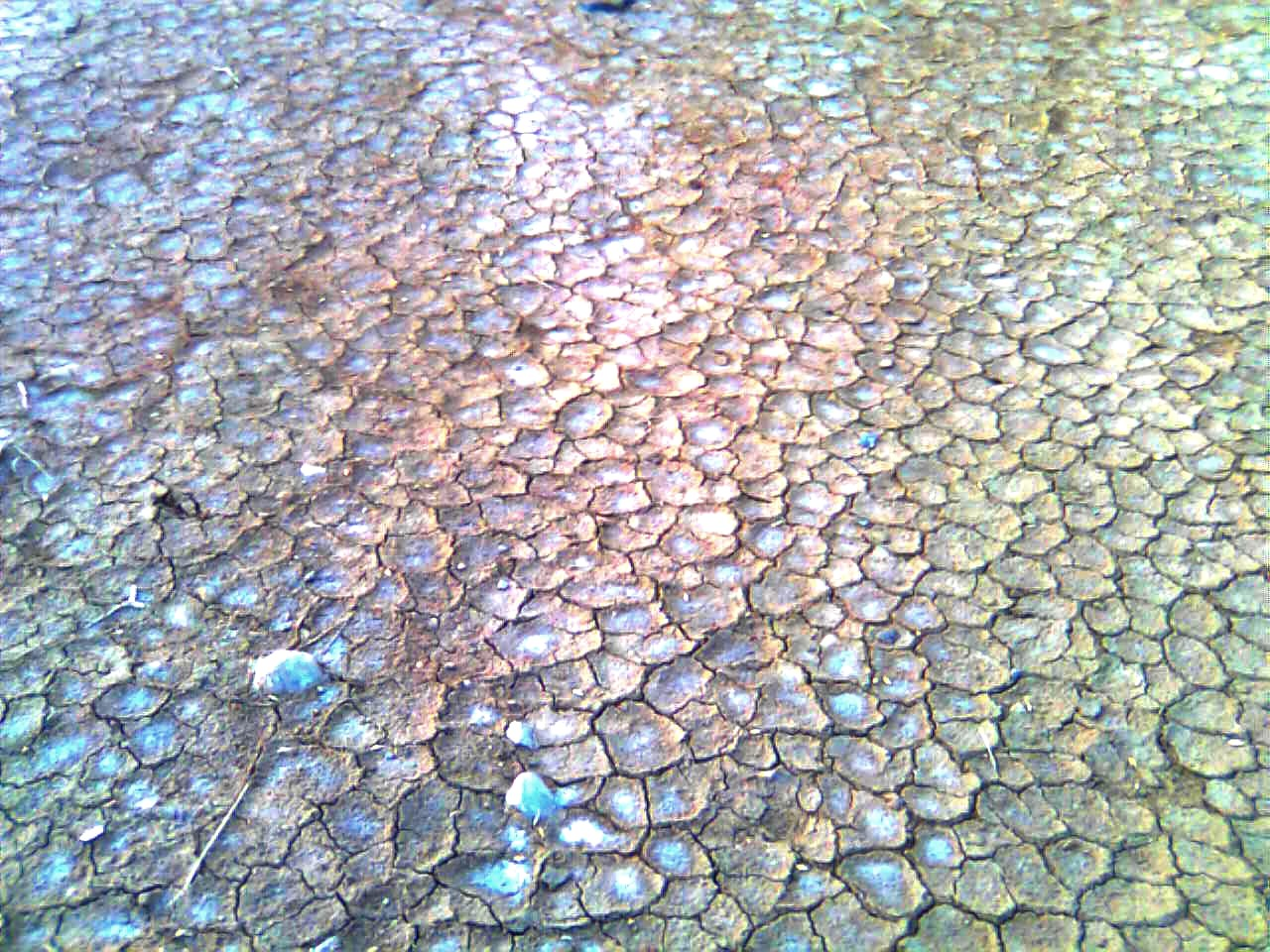
The cracked dry ground of Chott El Hodna

The Hodna (Arabic: حضنة) is a natural region of Algeria located between the Tell and Saharan Atlas ranges at the eastern end of the Hautes Plaines. It is a vast depression lying in the northeastern section of M'Sila Province and the western end of Batna Province.

== History ==
The Hodna region was home to the Kingdom of Hodna, born out of the Mauro-Roman Kingdom in the post-classical era.

== Geography ==
The Hodna region has a length of about 120 km in an NW - SE direction and a width of about 80 km. It is characterized by the Chott El Hodna, an endorheic salt lake, in its centre with seasonal brackish and saline pools and marshes. A thin film of water collects during wet seasons on the level terrain of the large lake basin, which becomes a salt flat when it dries. The elevation of the lake's surface is slightly below 400 m, while the surrounding steppe-like plain, characterized by wadis and oases, averages between 500 and 600 meters in elevation in the communes near the lake.

The Hodna natural region gives its name to the Hodna Mountains located to the north. Its southern limit is marked by the Ouled Nail Range. There are no mountains in its western limit, where the plateau stretches further westwards. The northern part of the Hodna is composed of silt and the southern part is mainly sandy. The lowest area of the basin is covered by the sebkha, the salt lake, with a surface of 76 000 ha of naked salty clay that is seldom covered with water and is completely devoid of vegetation.

The Hodna is a steppe where the climate is harsh, with very dry summers, cold winters and very irregular precipitation. Formerly all the inhabitants of the Hodna were nomads. The soil is poor and local agriculture is limited to the grazing of sheep and goats on grassy high plateau areas and to some cereal cultivation. There are uncultivated areas of djerr, small hillocks, to the north and to the east. The mountains have good reserves of water and there are freshwater springs in the area, but historically they have not been properly exploited.

== See also ==
- Geography of Algeria
