= Assekrem =

Plateau in Algeria

Coordinates: 23°12′40.6″N 5°43′41.6″E

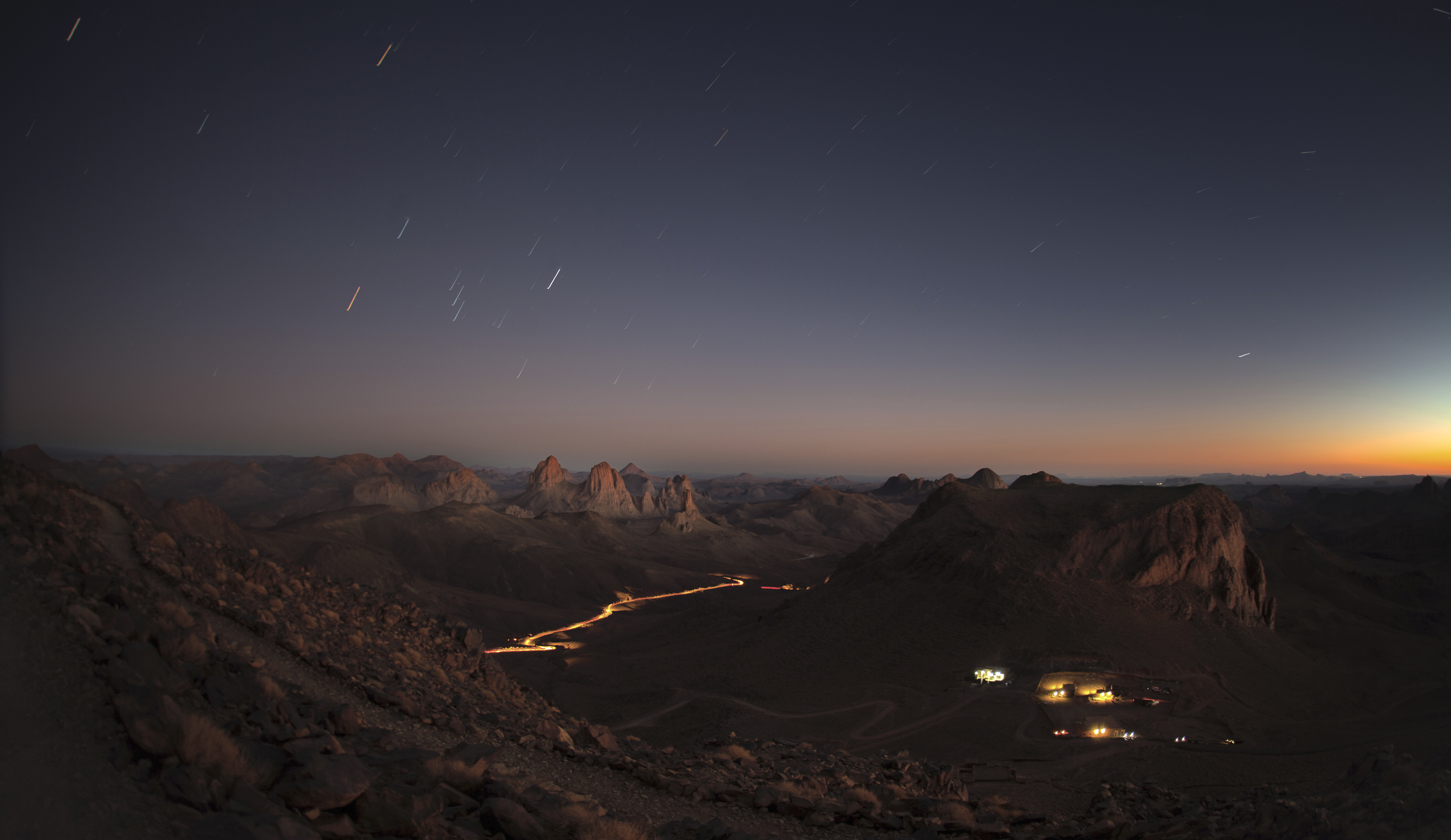
View from Assekrem

Short video sequence filmed from the Assekrem.

Assekrem is a high plateau in the Hoggar Mountains of southern Algeria. Rising from the larger Atakor plateau, Assekrem is within Ahaggar National Park. The maximum altitude of the plateau is 2,726 metres (8,944 ft).

The hermitage of Charles de Foucauld, which continues to be inhabited by a few monks, is at the top of the Assekrem plateau.
