= Atakor volcanic field =

Volcanic field in Algeria

Atakor Volcanic Field
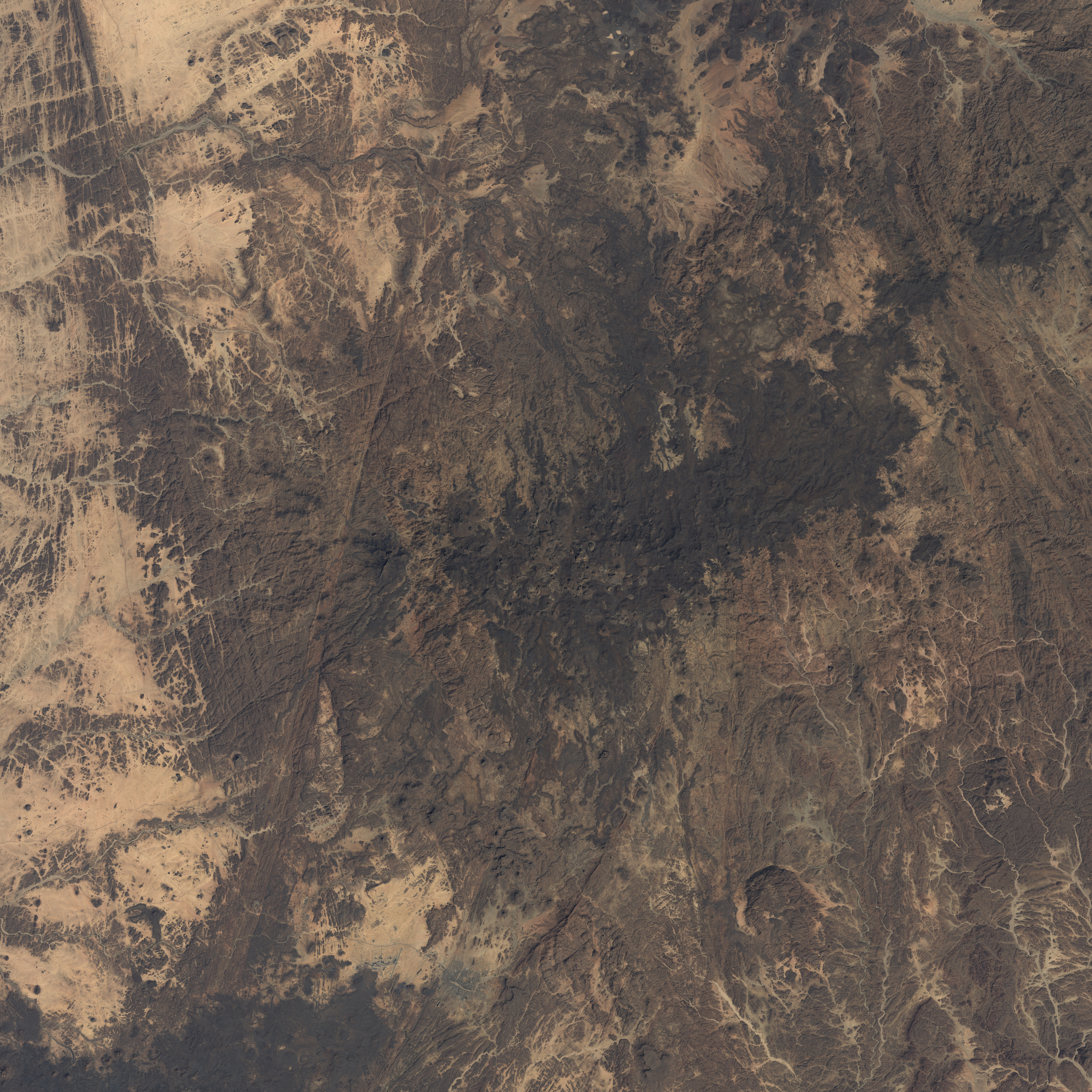
- Landsat satellite image of the Ahaggar with its central volcanic field

Highest point
- Elevation: 2,918 m (9,573 ft)
- Coordinates: 23.33°N 5.83°E

Geography
- Location within Algeria

Geology
- Mountain type: Volcano field
- Last eruption: Unknown (Possibly Holocene)

Atakor volcanic field ("Atakor" in Tuareg means "swollen part, knot at the end of something") is a volcanic field in Algeria. It lies in the Hoggar mountains and consists of a variety of volcanic features such as lava flows and about 450 individual vents.

Atakor is one of several large volcanic fields in this mountain range, which sits atop of a domal uplift and has erupted basalt, trachyte, and phonolite. Volcanism in Atakor took place in several different phases, beginning 20 million years ago and continuing into the Holocene. Presently there is fumarolic activity.

== Geography and geomorphology ==
The field lies in the Hoggar and the terrain approaches elevations of 3,000 metres (9,800 ft), although the volcanics form an only superficial cover. The ground has a desert-like appearance. The scenery of the volcanic field is considered to be spectacular, with the lava domes and volcanic necks rising above the surrounding terrain.

The field consists of lava domes, lava flows, maars, scoria cones, and volcanic necks and covers an area of about 2,500 square kilometres (970 sq mi) with a volume of about 250 cubic kilometres (60 cu mi) of volcanic rock. Basalts form a 400-metre-thick (1,300 ft) plateau, and deep gorges lead up to the volcanic field and split the Hoggar Mountains into a number of segments. Wadis diverge from the Atakor volcanic field; some of them reached Lake Chad in the past, while others continued through the Grand Erg Oriental towards Chott Melrhir.

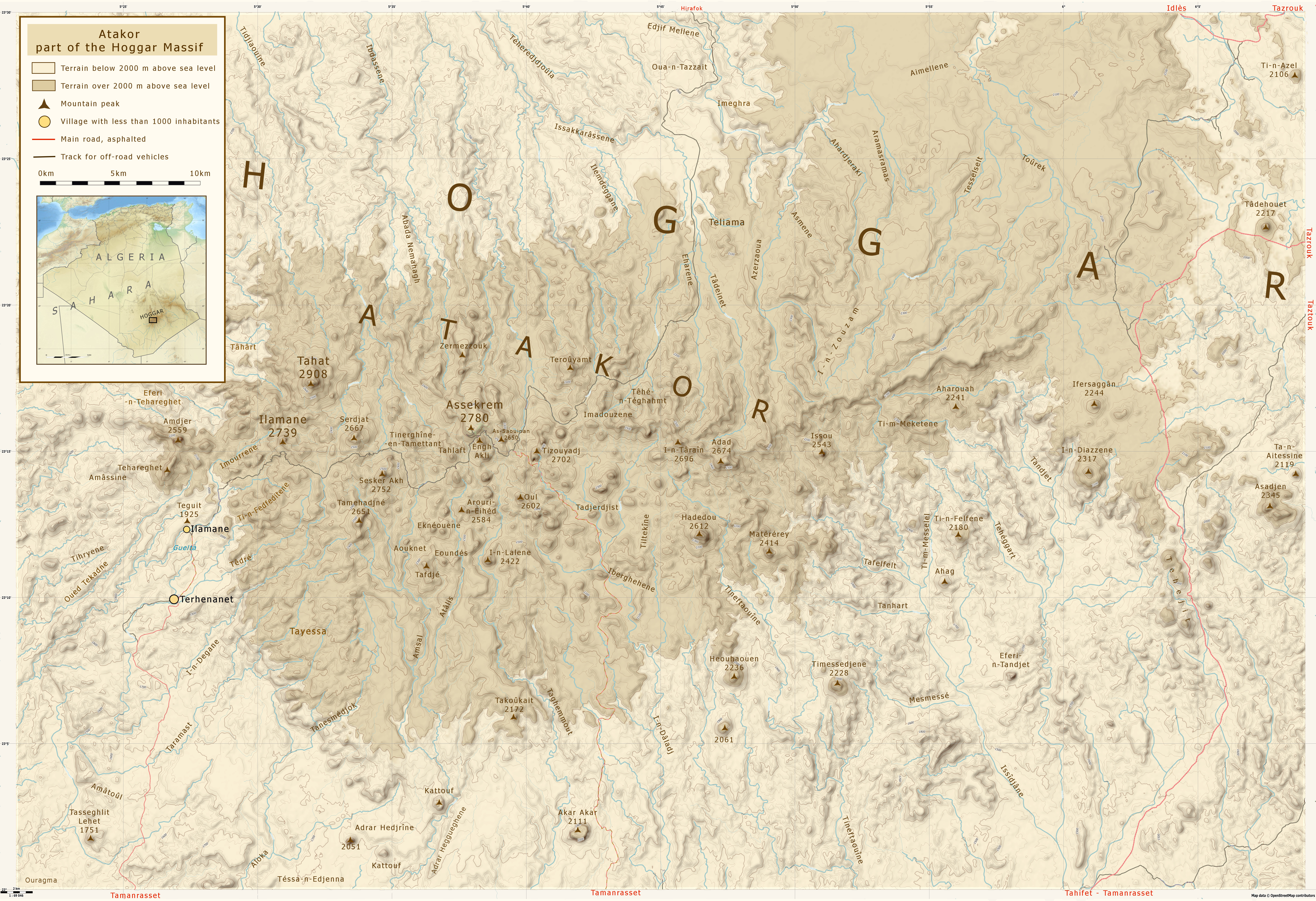
Topographic map of Atakor in the Hoggar Massif

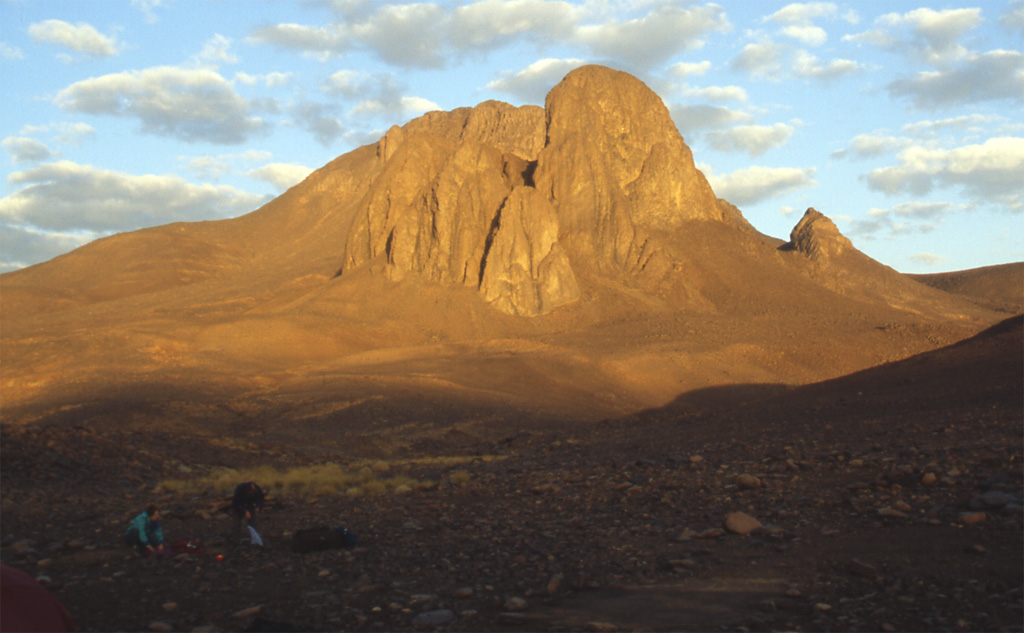
Tahat in the Atakor

There are about 450 recent volcanic centres, of which about 400 are lava domes and 50 are small stratovolcanoes. The latter include many recent cones which are accompanied by lava flows whose lengths reach 20 kilometres (12 mi). Among the older volcanoes of Atakor are the peaks Assekrem and Tahat, the latter of which is the highest summit in the Hoggar. Some of these volcanoes have craters, including double craters, and others are eroded to the point that only volcanic necks remain, while lava domes include shapes from steep pillars to short stubby lava flows and are responsible for much of the field's scenery. Some of these lava domes and necks penetrated older basaltic layers. Among the stratovolcanoes is the Oued Temorte cone, which is 300 metres (980 ft) high, 800 metres (2,600 ft) wide, and has erupted a lava flow over 10 kilometres (6.2 mi) long. It has also erupted volcanic ash, lapilli, and slag.

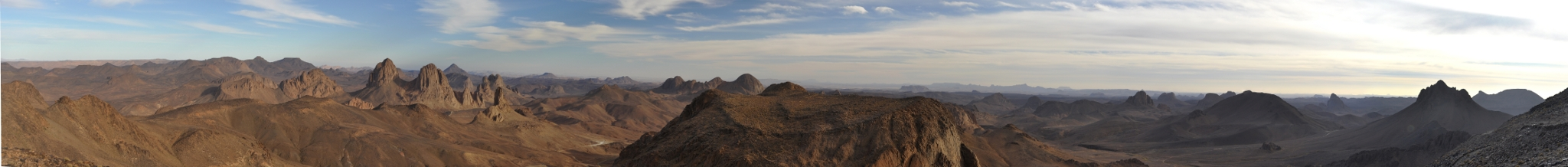

== Geology ==
Atakor is one in a group of volcanic fields of the Hoggar around Tamanrasset which include Adrar N' Ajjer, Eg'ere, Manzaz, and Tahalra, and is considered to be part of the Hoggar volcanic province. Over the last 34 million years, eruptions in the Hoggar province have covered an area of 11,700 square kilometres (4,500 sq mi) with 1,650 square kilometres (640 sq mi) of volcanic rocks. A low-seismic-velocity anomaly underpins the Atakor volcanic field in the mantle but does not appear to reflect the existence of a hotspot.

The basement is formed by Precambrian rocks that form a 1-kilometre-high (0.62 mi) swell known as the Hoggar swell, and is further part of the Neoproterozoic Tuareg Shield and a metacraton formed during the Eburnean orogeny. The basement crops out in deeply incised valleys, which in general appear to be younger than the Hoggar volcanism. Active faults occur throughout the region.

Atakor has erupted basalts, phonolite, and trachyte; the latter two form lava domes. The basalts are characterized by alkali basalts and basanite and form about 80% of all volcanic rocks in Atakor, with less important occurrences of benmoreite, hawaiite, mugearite, and rhyolite. Phenocrysts in some volcanic rocks include amphibole, clinopyroxene, olivine, and zircon. The Taessa lavas from this volcanic complex have a porphyritic texture. The volcanic rocks appear to ultimately derive from mantle plume melts, although a tectonic origin resulting from the convergence between the African and European plates has also been suggested.

=== Eruptive history ===
Volcanic activity in Atakor occurred 20–12 million years ago, 6.7–4.2 million years ago, and 1.95 million years ago until today, with most volcanic activity taking place during the first episode in the Burdigalian and Serravallian. The second and the third volcanic phases were also accompanied by substantial ground uplift. Phonolite and trachyte erupted first and basalts later, although contrary to initial belief, the flood basalts are from the oldest Tertiary, and the phonolitic-trachytic volcanism continued after the basaltic activity. Stratovolcanoes with lava flows are the most recent manifestations of activity in Atakor.

Activity continued in the Holocene, with lava flows covering Holocene features such as 10,000-year-old lacustrine sediments, pottery, and having a fresh appearance. Tuareg oral tradition of "fire mountains" appears to recount that Tuareg people observed eruptions. Local heat-flow anomalies, rare fumaroles, and observed seismicity are further evidence of ongoing volcanism.

== Climate and history ==
Atakor lies within the tropics (south of the Tropic of Cancer) and at high elevation. Precipitation is more common than in the surrounding desert, and during winter, it can occur in the form of snow; at Assekrem, annual precipitation is about 100–150 millimetres (3.9–5.9 in). In the past, precipitation was considerably higher than today, such as during the Villafranchian and the Paleolithic when nivation landforms developed above 2,000 metres (6,600 ft) elevation, as well as moraines such as at Tahat and rock glaciers. A last wet period occurred during the Neolithic.

Vegetation in Atakor is subdivided into several belts, including a lower Sudanian belt at 1,700–1,800 metres (5,600–5,900 ft) elevation with bushes and trees, a sub-Mediterranean between 1,800–2,400 metres (5,900–7,900 ft) which includes the olive, and a high Mediterranean belt which includes Clematis flammula. The volcanic field is used as a pasture.

== See also ==
- List of volcanic fields

== Bibliography ==
- Girod, Michel (1971). Le massif volcanique de l'Atakor (Hoggar, Sahara algérien): étude pétrographique, structurale et volcanologique (in French). Éditions du Centre national de la recherche scientifique.
- Rognon, Pierre (1967). Le Massif de l'Atakor et ses bordures (Sahara central), étude géomorphologique . (in French). Éditions du centre national de la recherche scientifique.
