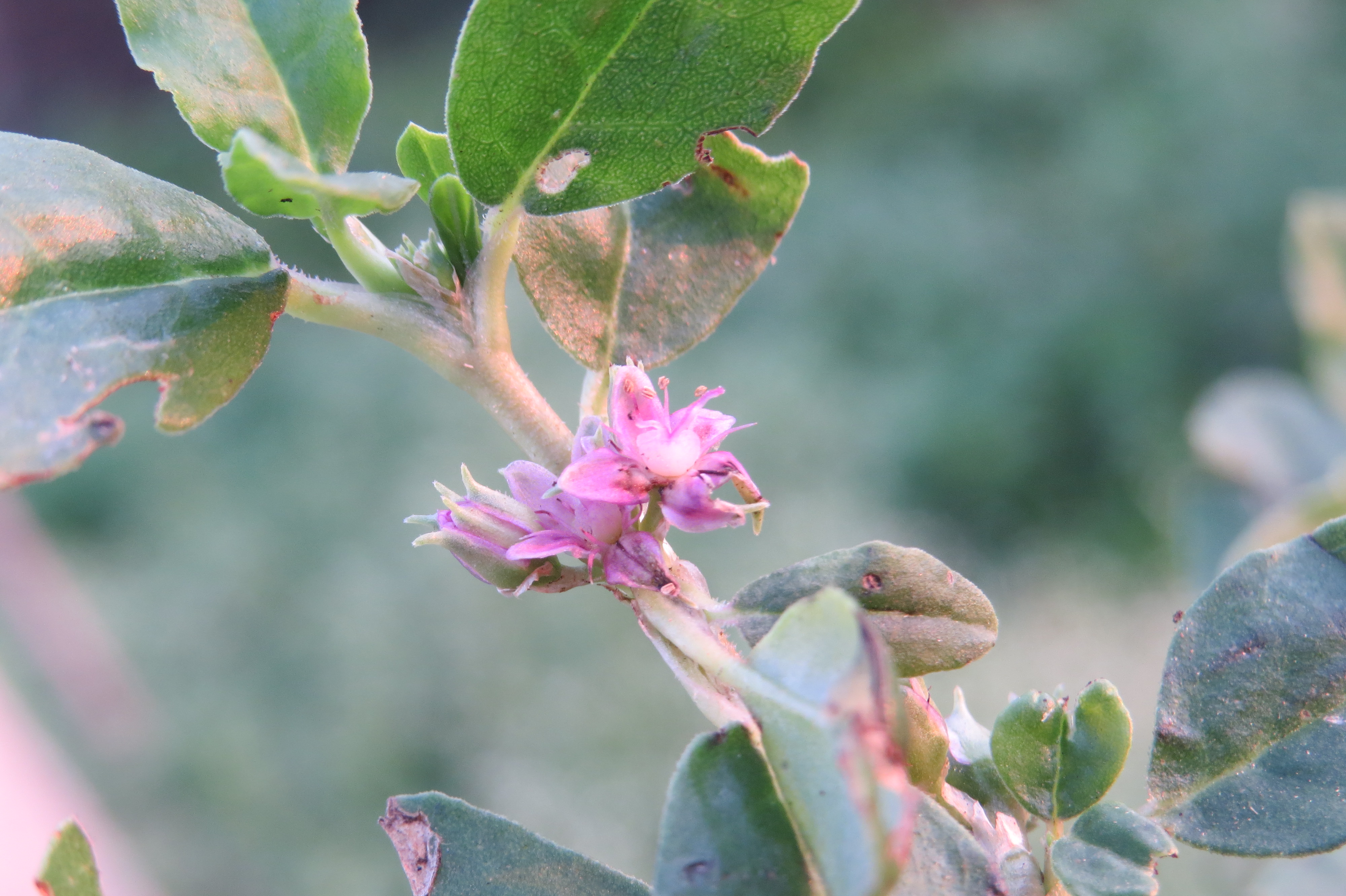
- Zaleya decandra

Scientific classification
- Kingdom: Plantae
- Clade: Embryophytes
- Clade: Tracheophytes
- Clade: Angiosperms
- Clade: Eudicots
- Order: Caryophyllales
- Family: Aizoaceae
- Subfamily: Sesuvioideae
- Genus: Zaleya; Burm.f.

Species
- See text

Synonyms
- Rocama Forssk.; Zallia Roxb.

= Zaleya =

Genus of flowering plants

Zaleya is a genus of flowering plants in the iceplant family Aizoaceae, found in Cape Verde, Africa, Madagascar, Réunion, Socotra, western Asia, the Indian Subcontinent, Sri Lanka, Myanmar, and Australia.

== Species ==
Currently accepted species include:

- Zaleya camillei (Cordem.) H.E.K.Hartmann
- Zaleya decandra (L.) Burm.f.
- Zaleya galericulata (Melville) H.Eichler
- Zaleya govindia (Buch.-Ham. ex G.Don) N.C.Nair
- Zaleya pentandra (L.) C.Jeffrey
- Zaleya redimita (Melville) Bhandari
