= Tahalra volcanic field =

Volcanic field in Tamanrasset Province, Algeria

- Location within Algeria

Highest point
- Elevation: 1,467 m (4,813 ft)
- Coordinates: 22.67°N 5°E

Tahalra volcanic field is a volcanic field in Algeria. It consists of a Miocene lava plateau and a number of Pliocene to Holocene age individual vents, including cinder cones.

== Geography and geomorphology ==
Tamanrasset lies east-northeast from the field. Cinder cones, lava domes, lava flows and maars form the field, which covers a surface of 1,800 square kilometres (690 sq mi) elongated west to east. There are about 132 individual vents in the area measuring 30 by 80 kilometres (19 mi × 50 mi).

== Geology ==
Tahalra is part of a province of volcanic fields in the Hoggar, which has been active since the Mesozoic. Seismic tomography has shown the existence of low-velocity mantle beneath the Tahalra and Atakor volcanic fields, sign of the presence of recent volcanism.

The basement beneath the field consists of rocks of Precambrian age, mostly metamorphic rocks and plutons which are part of a mobile belt at the margin of the West African Craton. Parts of the basement are covered with Paleozoic rocks.

The field has erupted basalt, basanite, rhyolite and trachyte. They contain amphibole, clinopyroxene, magnetite and olivine phenocrysts. Patterns in trace element composition and isotope ratios imply that the magmas either developed from variable starting material or from metasomatized mantle.

== Eruptive history ==
Volcanic activity started in the Miocene and led to the development of a lava plateau up to 100 metres (330 ft) thick. Eruptions continued in the Pliocene and the Pleistocene, forming many individual vents. Maars and cones in the northern part of the field are of Pleistocene and Holocene age (Paleolithic to Neolithic).

== See also ==
- List of volcanic fields
