= Manzaz volcanic field =

Volcanic field in Algeria

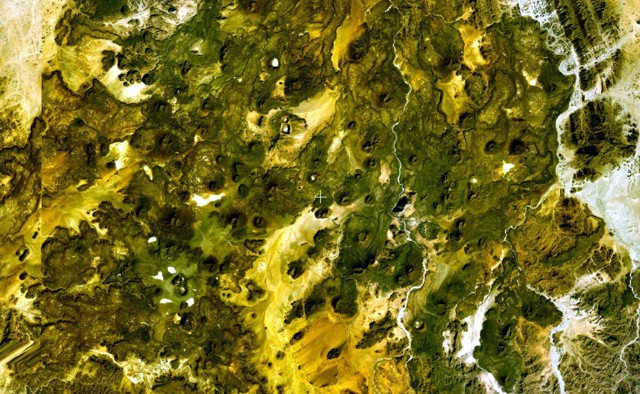
- Manzaz seen from space

Highest point
- Elevation: 1,672 m (5,486 ft)
- Coordinates: 23.92°N 5.83°E

Geography
- Location within Algeria

Manzaz volcanic field is a volcanic field in Algeria. It consists of scoria cones with lava flows and has been active until recently.

== Geography and geomorphology ==
The field lies in Hoggar, close to the Atakor volcanic field. A dome-like uplift has been associated with the volcanism in the region. The presence of volcanism has been explained by tectonic events associated with the collision between Europe and Africa, and the resulting reactivation of ancient tectonic lineaments.

The field consists of scoria cones and covers a surface of 1,500 square kilometres (580 sq mi). Many of these have breaches and are heavily eroded. The cones were strombolianically active and have erupted lava flows. Volcanic ash and pyroclastics are also found. Some eruptions took place along fissure vents. Lava flows have surrounded older granite peaks. Oukcem is a maar in the field that consists of two separate craters with diameters of 500 metres (1,600 ft) and 700 metres (2,300 ft) respectively. They are surrounded by tuffs and natron is found at the bottom of the larger crater, as the maar occasionally floods. Local people use the natron.

== Geology ==
The basement consists of metamorphic and plutonic rocks of Precambrian age, which are part of the Tuareg shield and of the LATEA metacraton. They form a 1,000 kilometres (620 mi) wide uplift of unclear origin in the Hoggar. Outcrops of granite are found in some places. These were first buried by tholeiitic basalts between 35 and 30 million years ago.

The field has mostly erupted basalt and basanite, with rarer trachyandesite and trachybasalt. Xenoliths include peridotite and pyroxenite, and amphibole and feldspar form megacrysts in the rocks. Xenoliths appear to, in part, originate from a metasomatized mantle. The total volume of erupted rocks is about 175 cubic kilometres (42 cu mi).

== Eruptive history ==
Three phases of volcanic activity have been distinguished at Manzaz, the first between 20 and 12 million years ago, the second between 7 and 4 million years ago and the third between 3 and 0.01 million years ago. Only one precise date is known, 1.51±0.85 million years. Volcanic activity continued into the Holocene. Some young volcanoes developed on terraces of Neolithic age or have a young, uneroded appearance.

== See also ==
- List of volcanic fields
