= Zaleya pentandra =

Scientific classification
- Kingdom: Plantae
- Clade: Tracheophytes
- Clade: Angiosperms
- Clade: Eudicots
- Order: Caryophyllales
- Family: Aizoaceae
- Genus: Zaleya
- Species: Z. pentandra

Binomial name
- Zaleya pentandra (L.) C.Jeffrey

Species of plant

Zaleya pentandra is a prostrate perennial herb of the Aizoaceae family. It is widespread in semi-arid and arid climes and also in woodlands and can adapt to different ecological zones.

== Distribution ==
The species is native to Africa with further dispersal to the Arabian Peninsula, Iran, India, and Pakistan. It is sometimes called African purslane. It grows as a xero-halophyte herb in desert regions of Cholistan and Thar in Pakistan.

== Description ==
The stems are papillose to glabrous and branches pubescent. Leaves can grow in various sizes, 1.5 – 4 cm long and 0.6 - 2.7 broad; oblanceolate to elliptical, dark green with a tinge of grey on the surface. Petioles are shorter than the blade at about 8 – 11 cm long with sheathing at the base.

== Uses ==
A material used by some locals in folk medicine, root and leaf extracts are applied to treat snake bites, cough or stomach issues. However, it is also considered highly toxic in some areas in India and as an invasive weed in regions of Pakistan.

In Senegal, it is used as cattle fodder.
