= Swell (geology) =

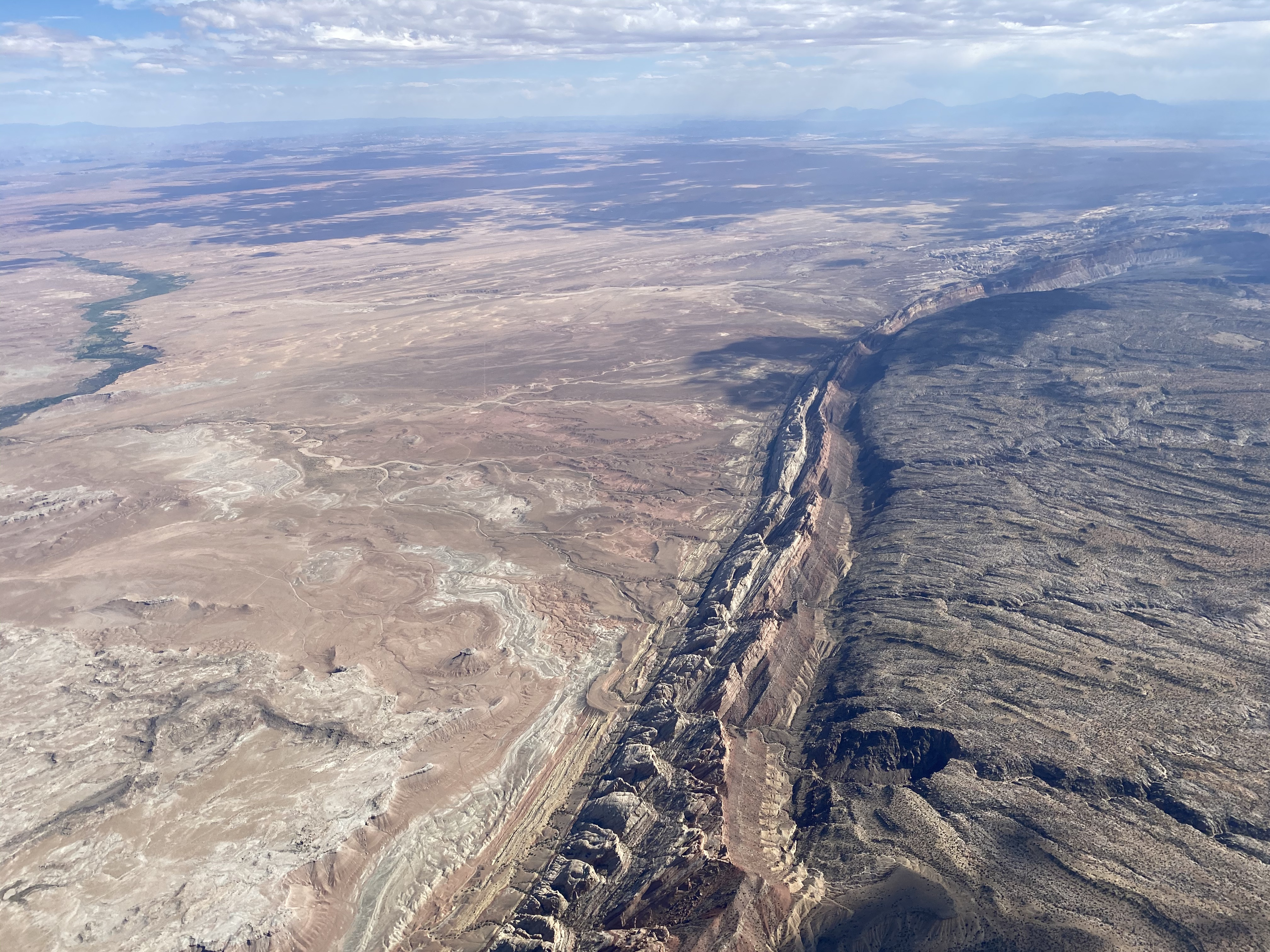
San Rafael Swell

A swell in geology is a domed area of considerable areal extent.

According to Leser, it is also called a sill (geology), and is a gently arched landform of various orders of size in topographic, sub-glacial or sub-hydric geology. It may be as small as a rock formation in a river or may assume continental scale.
