= Hautes Plaines =

Coordinates: 34°00′N 0°30′E

- Natural region
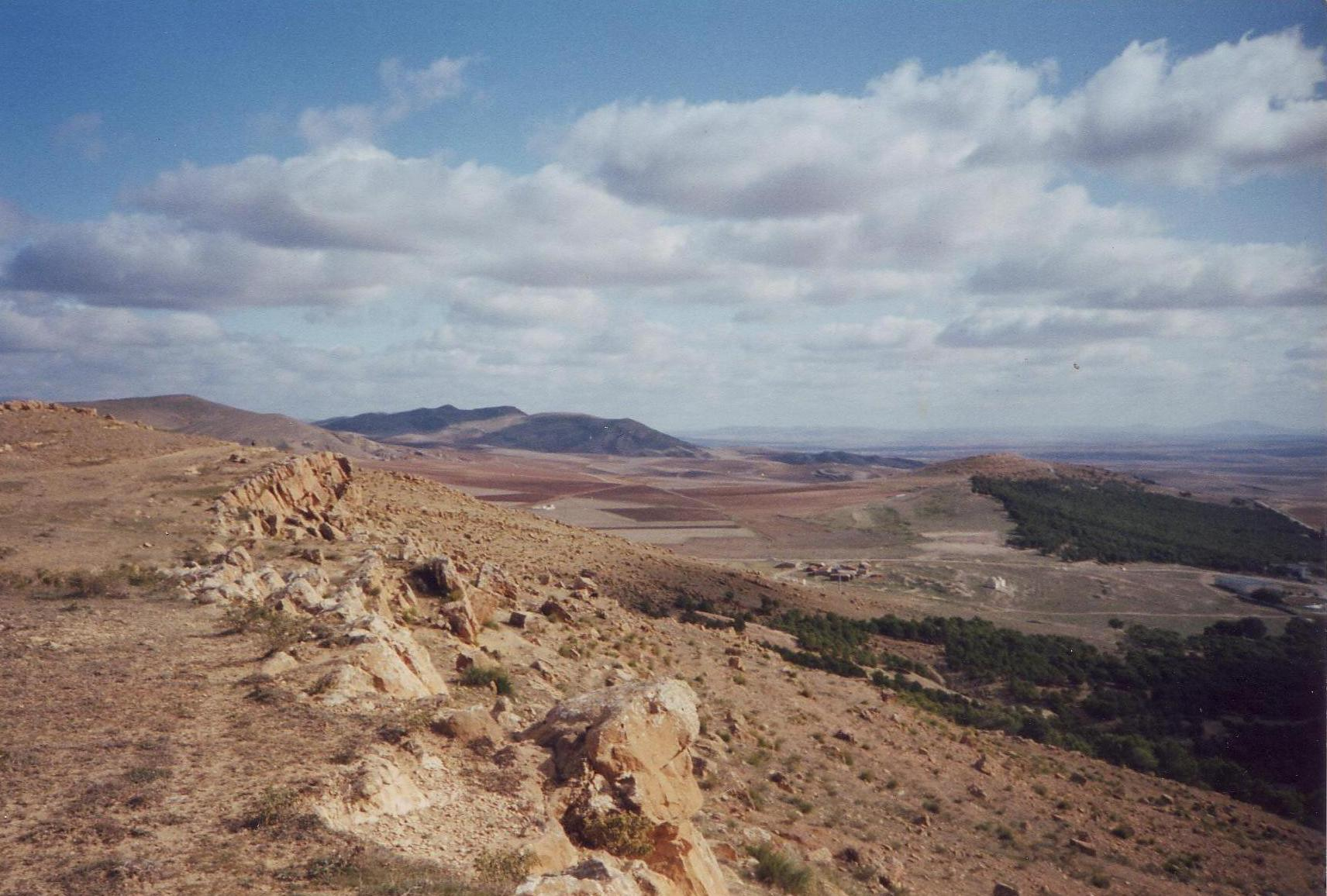
- Landscape of the eastern Hautes Plaines near Ksar Sbahi, Oum el Bouaghi Province

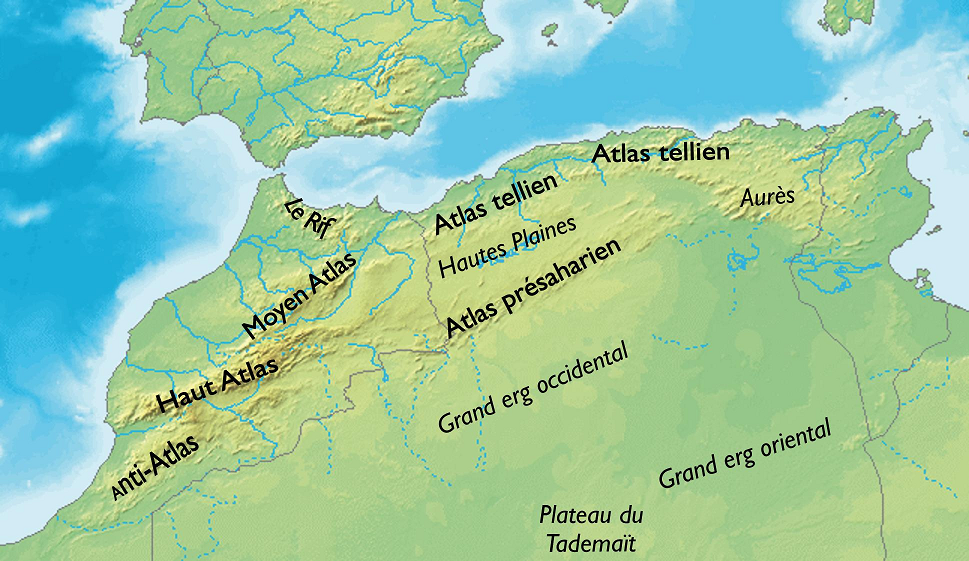
- A map of northern Algeria showing the location of the Hautes Plaines
- Country: Algeria and NE Morocco
- Elevation: 1,000 m (3,300 ft)

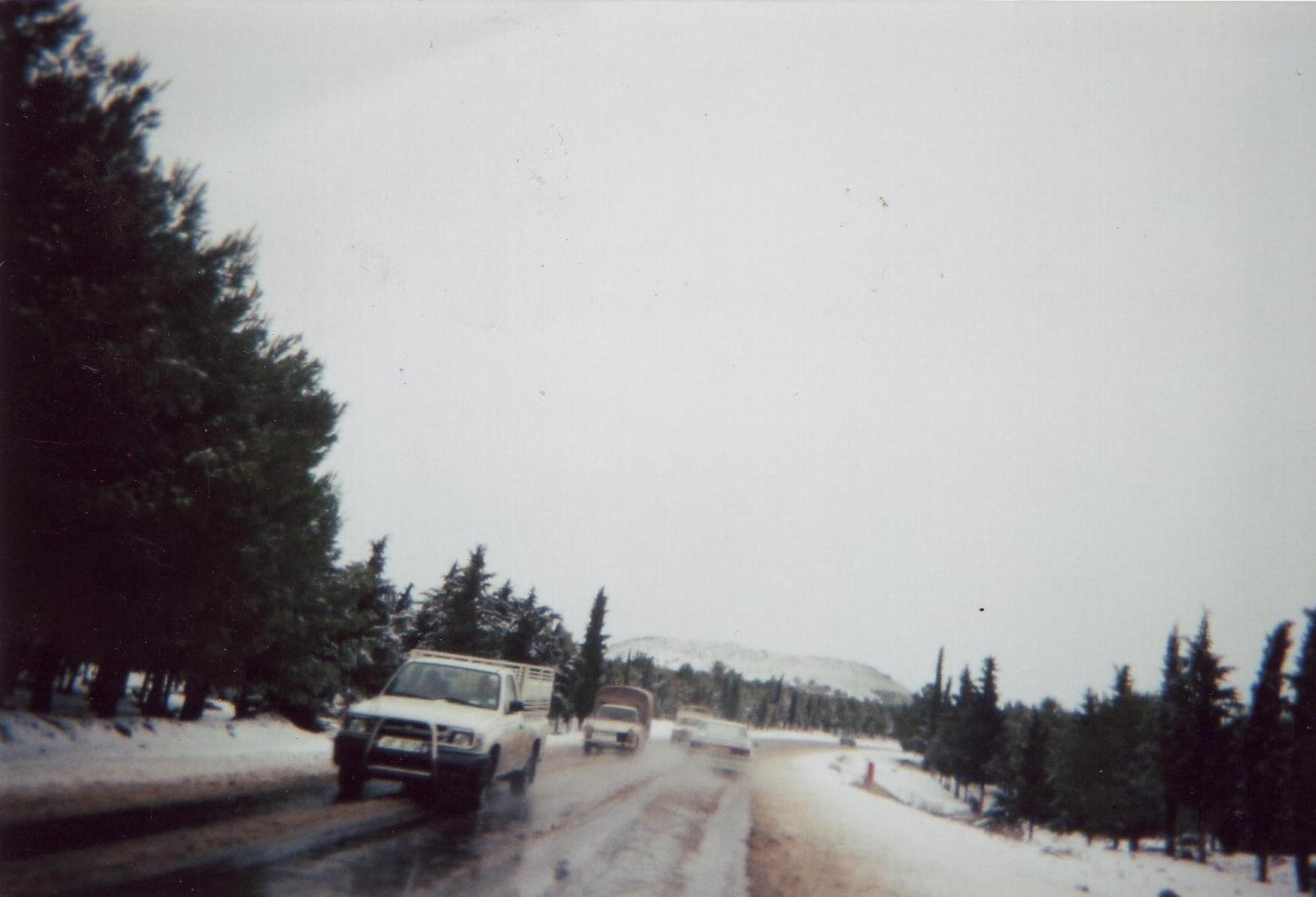
Winter in the Hautes Plaines near Aïn Babouche.

The Hautes Plaines ("High Plains", Arabic: الهضاب العليا), also known in French as Hauts Plateaux, is a steppe-like natural region located in the Atlas Mountains in northern Algeria. It stretches more than 600 km (370 mi) in an east northeast – west southwest direction from northeastern Morocco to the Aures. It is a high plateau area consisting of undulating, steppe-like alluvial plains lying between the Tell and Saharan Atlas ranges.

== Geography ==
The Hautes Plaines region averages between 1,100 and 1,300 m in elevation in the west, dropping to 400 m in the east. The climate is characterized by very dry summers and cold winters. Generally the climate is so dry that these plains are sometimes thought of as part of the Sahara.

The plateau area is covered by alluvial debris formed when the mountains eroded. An occasional ridge projects through the alluvial cover to interrupt the monotony of the landscape.

Water collects during the wet season on its level terrain, forming large shallow salt lakes which become salt flats as they dry. The largest of such lakes is the Chott Ech Chergui with a length of about 160 km located in the central section of the plains. The Hodna region, with the Chott el Hodna lies at the eastern end of the Hautes Plaines.

The main towns of the plateau are Bordj Bou Arreridj, Sétif, Tiaret, Djelfa and M'sila. The limits of the plains are not clearly defined, but administratively the territory falls within the following Algerian provinces:

- Eastern part: The plateau on this side falls within the provinces of Sétif, Bordj Bou Arreridj, Batna, Khenchela, Tébessa and Oum El Bouaghi.
- Central part: Djelfa, Laghouat, M’Sila and Tissemsilt provinces.
- Western part: Tiaret, Saida, Naâma and El Bayadh provinces.

Agriculture includes grazing of sheep and goats on grass in better-watered high plateau areas and the cultivation of some crops such as dry-land barley.

== See also ==
- Geography of Algeria
- Hodna
