= Mount Tahat =

Highest mountain peak in Algeria

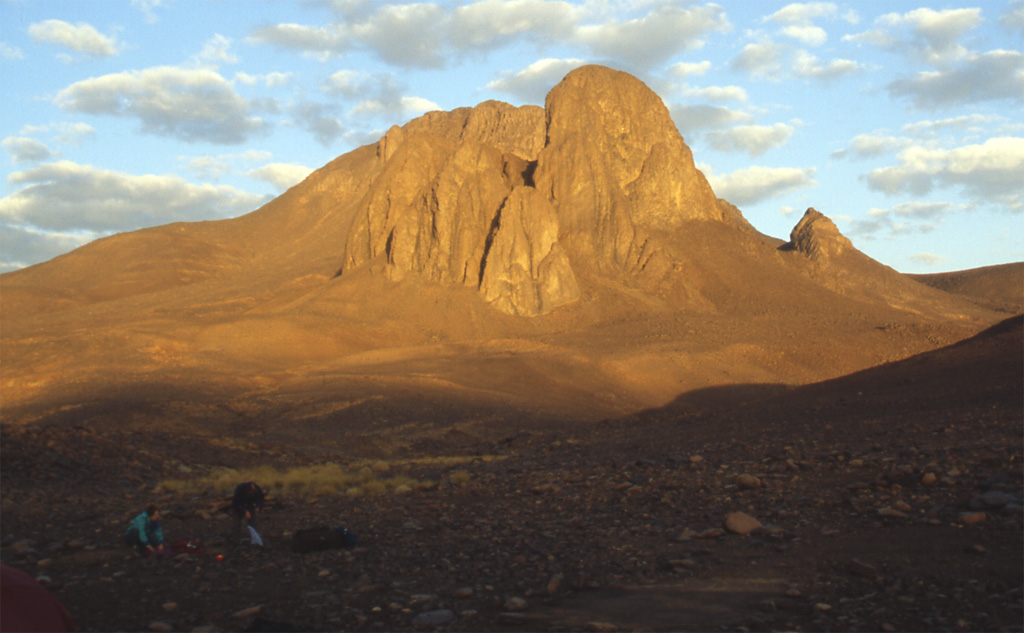

Highest point
- Elevation: 3,003 m (9,852 ft)
- Prominence: 2,908 m (9,541 ft)
- Listing: Country high point List of mountains in Algeria; Ultra; Ribu
- Coordinates: 23°17′20″N 5°32′01″E

Naming
- Native name: جبل تاهات (Arabic)

Geography
- Location within Algeria
- Location: Algeria
- Parent range: Hoggar Mountains

Climbing
- First ascent: 1931

Mount Tahat (Arabic: جبل تاهات) is the highest mountain in Algeria. It sits at an elevation of 3003 metres (9,991 ft). Other sources indicate an elevation of 3,003 metres (9,852 ft). Tahat is also the highest peak in the Hoggar Mountains. Its nearest city is Tamanrasset which is located 56 kilometres (35 mi) to the south.

Mount Tahat is of volcanic origin. It is located in an arid, rocky high plateau area of the central Sahara Desert. The Tuareg inhabit this region. To the north lie the Tassili n'Ajjer mountains, which contain cave paintings dating from a period between 8000 and 2000 BC. The rock art is pastoral, showing cattle breeding and hunting of animals that are today exclusively found in the southern Sahara's climate.

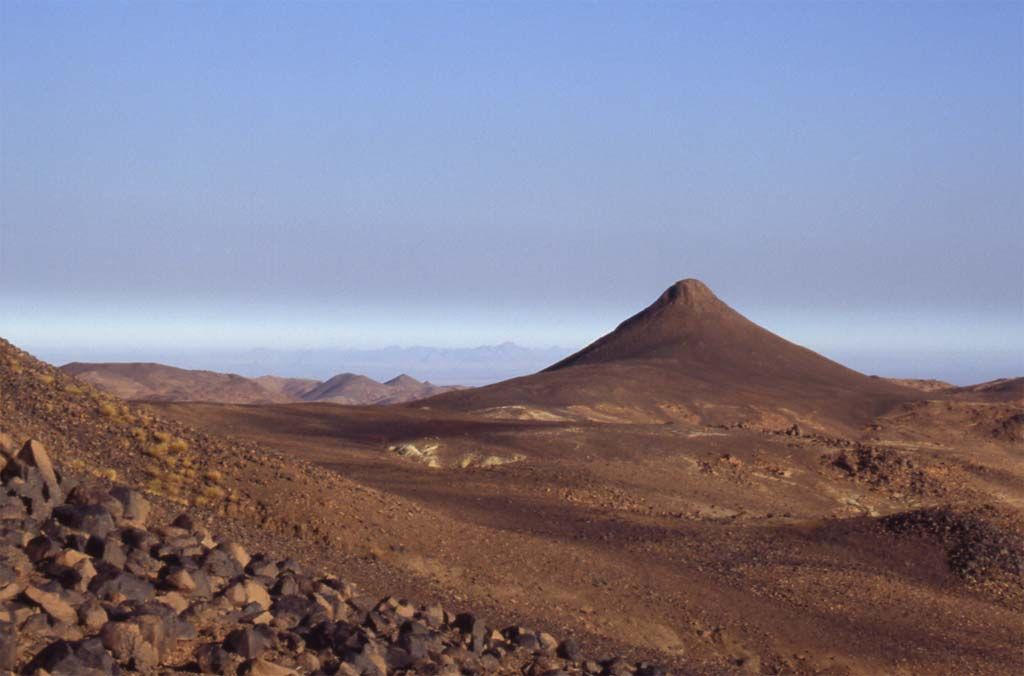
Mount Tahat, Algeria

== See also ==
- List of Ultras of Africa
- Atakor volcanic field
