= Hoggar Mountains =

Mountain range in Algeria

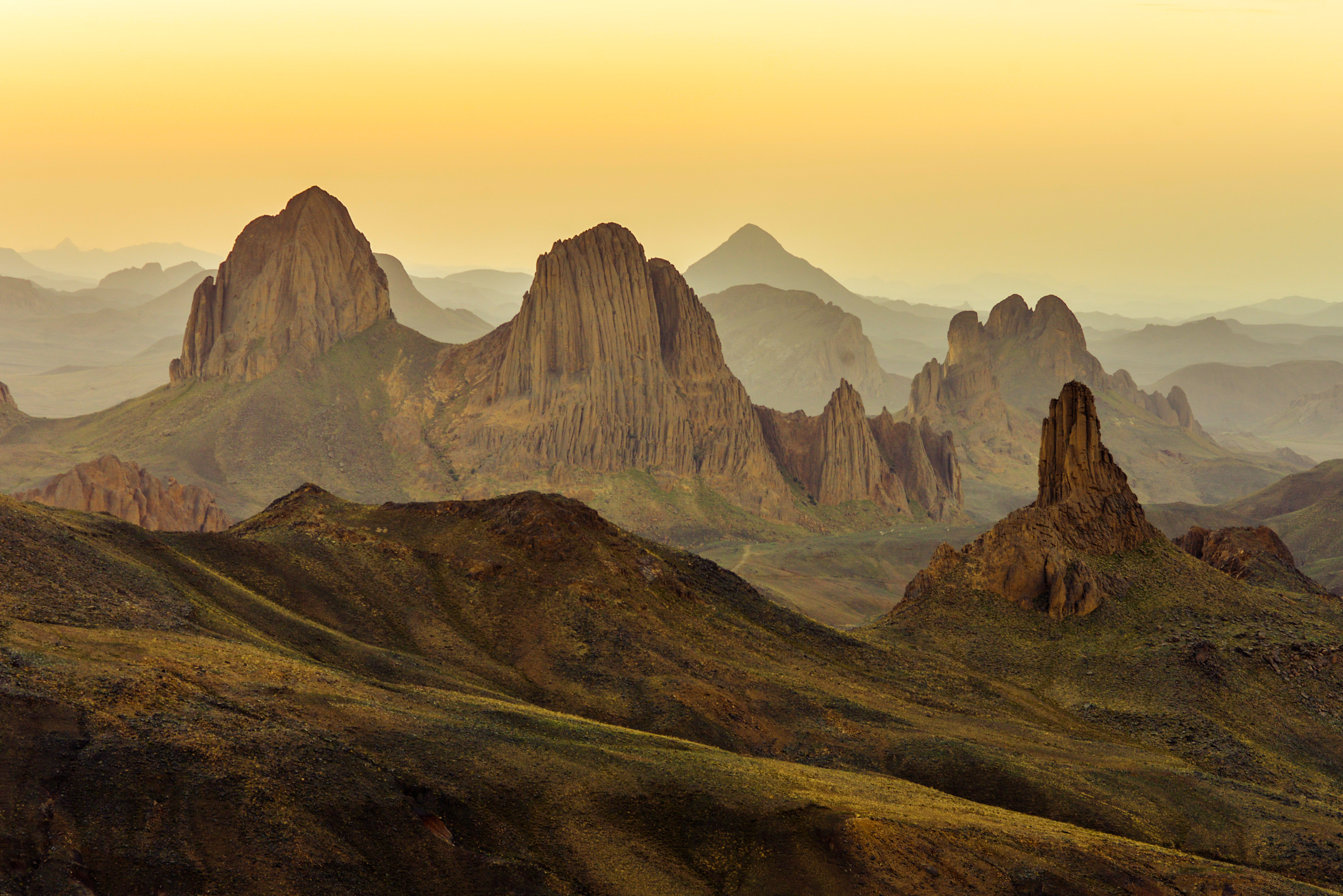
- Landscape of the Assekrem region in the Hoggar in Tamanrasset Province

Highest point
- Peak: Mount Tahat
- Elevation: 2,908 m (9,541 ft)
- Coordinates: 23°17′20″N 05°32′01″E

Naming
- Native name: جبال هقار (Arabic); Idurar n Uhaggar (Berber languages)

Geography
- Location within Algeria
- Country: Algeria

Hoggar National Park
- IUCN category II (national park)
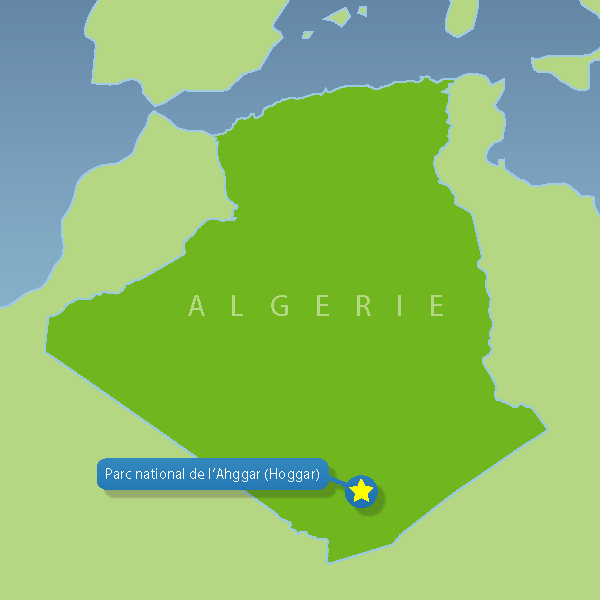
- Locator map
- Interactive map of Hoggar National Park
- Location: Tamanrasset Province, Algeria
- Nearest city: Tamanrasset
- Coordinates: 22°08′N 6°10′E
- Area: 450,000 km^{2} (170,000 sq mi)
- Established: 1987
- Disestablished: 2011

The Hoggar Mountains (Arabic: جبال هقار, romanized: Jibāl Haqqār; Berber: idurar n Ahaggar) are a highland region in the central Sahara in southern Algeria, along the Tropic of Cancer, that covers an area of approximately 550,000 km^{2}.

The mountains are home to the Ahaggar Cultural Park (from 1987 to 2011 Ahaggar National Park). The tallest peak in the range and Algeria, Mount Tahat, is located in the park area, which covers approximately 450,000 square kilometres (170,000 sq mi).

== Geography ==
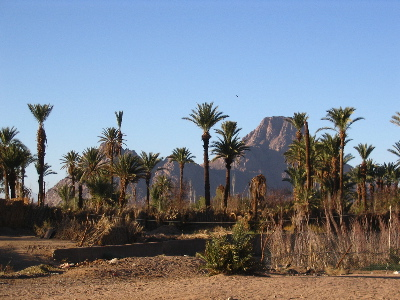
An oasis in the Hoggar Mountains

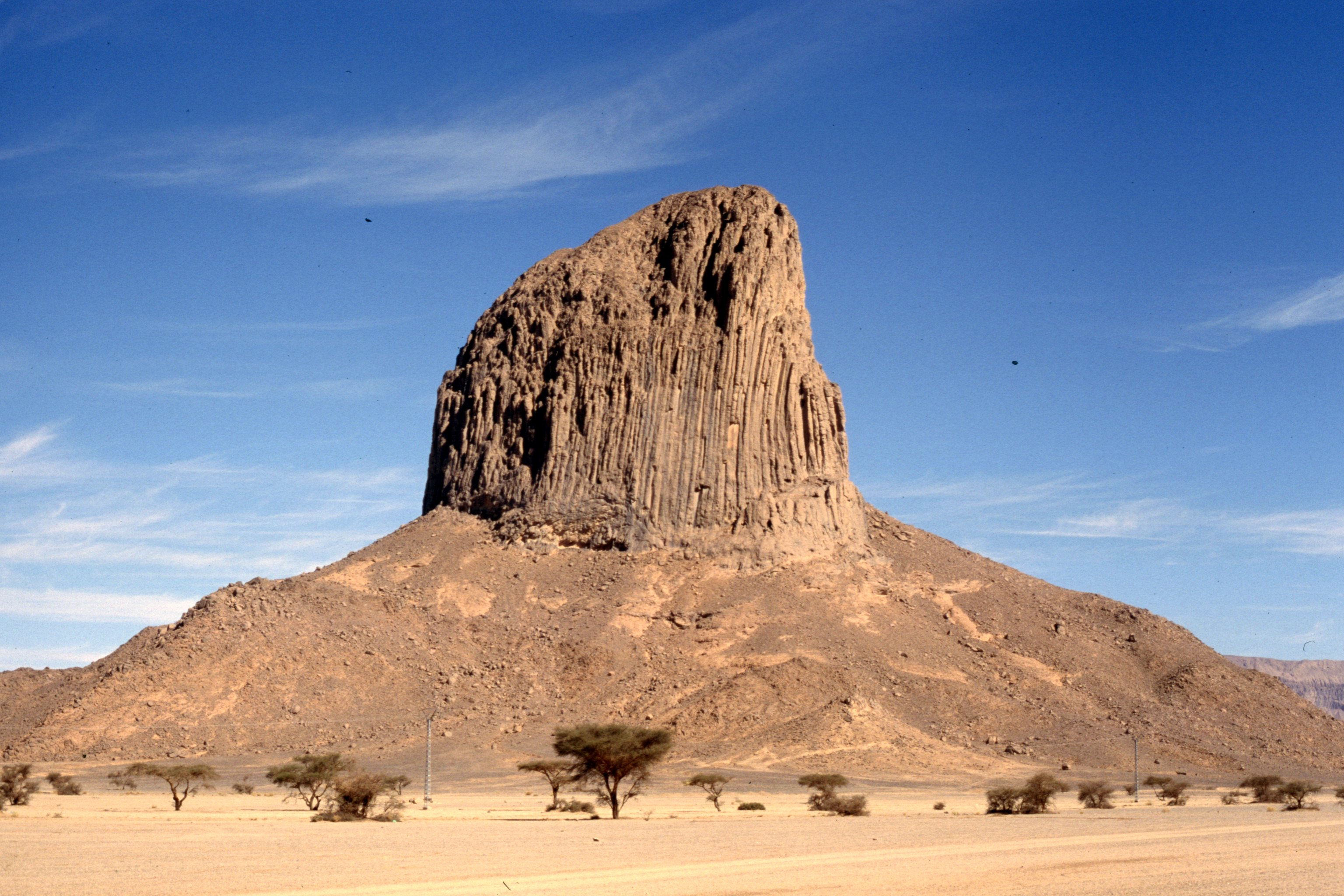
Iharen, 1732 m, north of Tamanrasset

This mountainous region is located about 1,500 km (930 mi) south of the capital, Algiers. The area is largely rocky desert with an average elevation of more than 900 m (3,000 ft) above sea level. The highest peak, Mount Tahat, is at 2,908 m (9,541 ft). The mountains are primarily composed of metamorphic rock approximately 2 billion years old although there are areas in which more recent volcanic activity has laid down much newer rock. Several of the more dramatic peaks, such as Ilamen, are the result of erosion wearing away extinct volcano domes, leaving behind the more resistant material that plugged the volcanic cones.

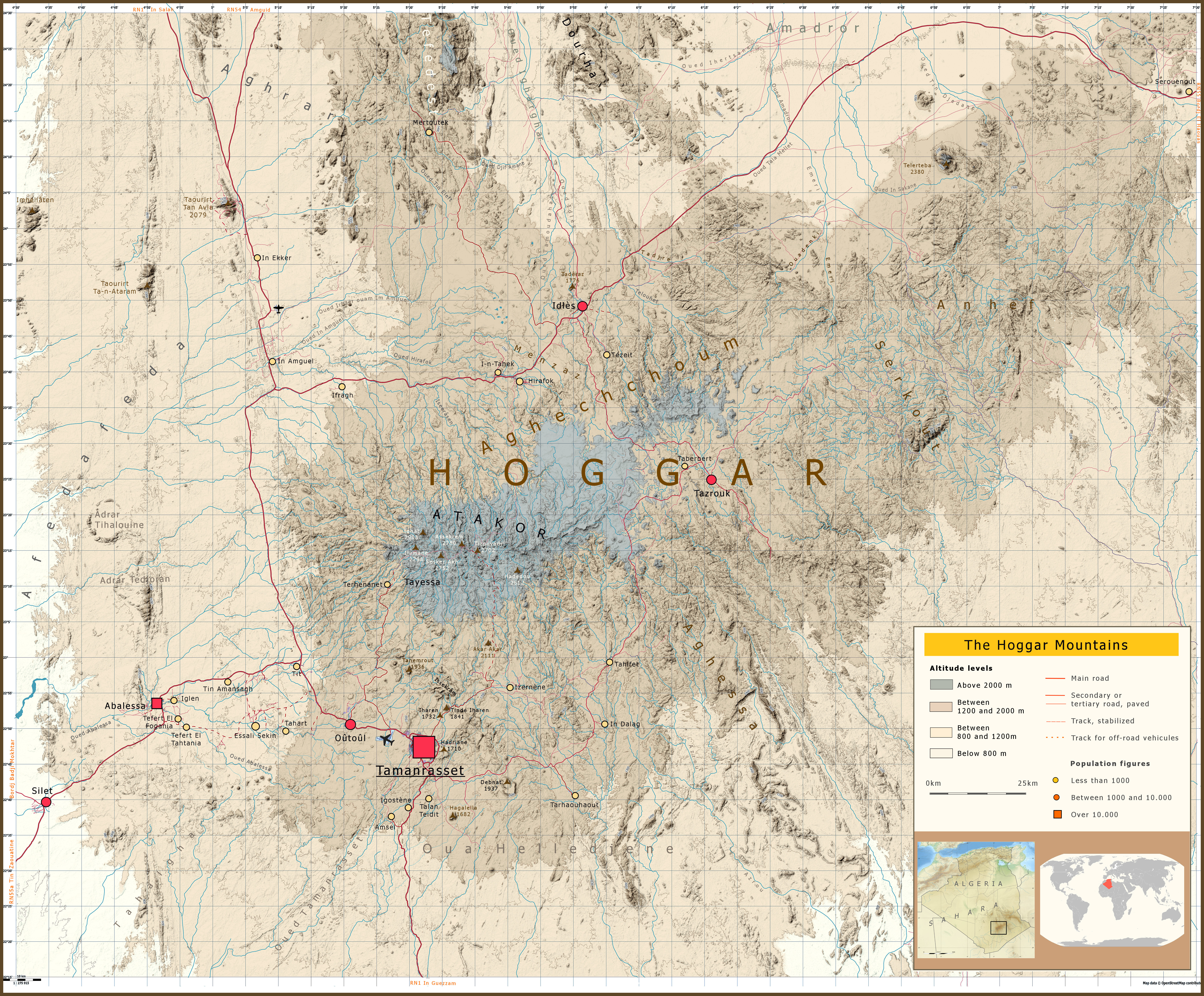
Topographic map of the Hoggar Mountains

Assekrem is a famous and often-visited point, where Charles de Foucauld built a hermitage in 1911.

The highlands are believed to be one of the main sources of the Tamanrasset River, an ancient river that flowed during the African humid period and was named after the main city nearby, Tamanrasset. The city was built in a desert valley, or wadi, that was part of the ancient watercourse.

== Environment ==
The Hoggar Mountains range typically experiences hot summers, with a cold winter climate. Temperatures fall below freezing over winter nights. Rainfall is rare and sporadic year-round. However, since the climate is less extreme than in most other areas of the Sahara, the mountains are a major location for biodiversity, including a number of relict species. The mountains are part of the West Saharan montane xeric woodlands ecoregion.

=== Flora and fauna ===
Vegetation in this area includes trees such as Vachellia tortilis, Vachellia seyal, myrtle and Tamarix aphylla which are scattered throughout the area. Other plants may include Citrullus colocynthis and Calotropis procera.

Slightly to the west of the Hoggar range, a population of the endangered African wild dog (Lycaon pictus) remained viable into the 20th century, but is now thought to be extirpated within this entire region. Relict populations of the West African crocodile persisted in the Hoggar Mountains until the early 20th century.

Analysis of collected scat in 2006 showed the presence of the Northwest African cheetah in the region. Between August 2008 and November 2010, four individuals were recorded by camera traps. A single cheetah was filmed and photographed by Algerian naturalists in 2020 in the national park in the Atakor volcanic field. The park also contains a population of herbivores such as the Saharan subspecies of the barbary sheep and the Dorcas gazelle.

The park has been designated an Important Bird Area (IBA) by BirdLife International because it supports significant populations of spotted, crowned and Lichtenstein's sandgrouse, pharaoh eagle-owls, pallid harriers, greater hoopoe-larks, bar-tailed and desert larks, pale rock martins, fulvous babblers, white-crowned and mourning wheatears, desert sparrows and trumpeter finches.

== History ==
Prehistoric settlement is evident from extant rock paintings dating to 6000 BC. The Hoggar Massif is the land of the Kel Ahaggar Tuareg. The tomb of Tin Hinan, the woman believed to be the matriarch of the Tuareg, is located at Abalessa, an oasis near Tamanrasset.

The hermitage of Charles de Foucauld, which continues to be inhabited by a few Catholic monks, is at the top of the Assekrem plateau in the Hoggar Mountains.

Underground atomic tests were conducted by France in the mountains in the 1960s.

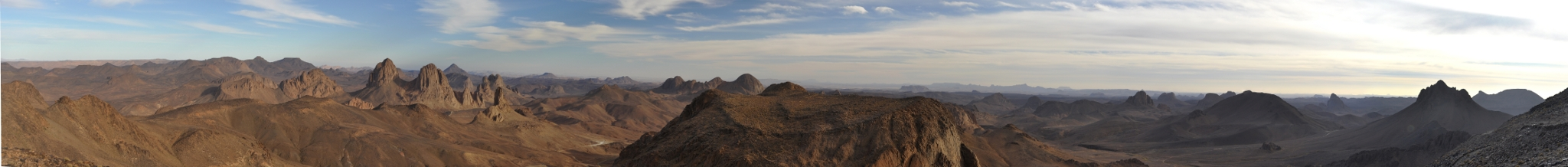
Panorama of the Ahaggar Mountains

== See also ==
- Saharan rock art
- Teffedest Mountains
