= Tiout, Algeria =

Tiout بلدية تيوت
- Municipality
- Commune of Tiout
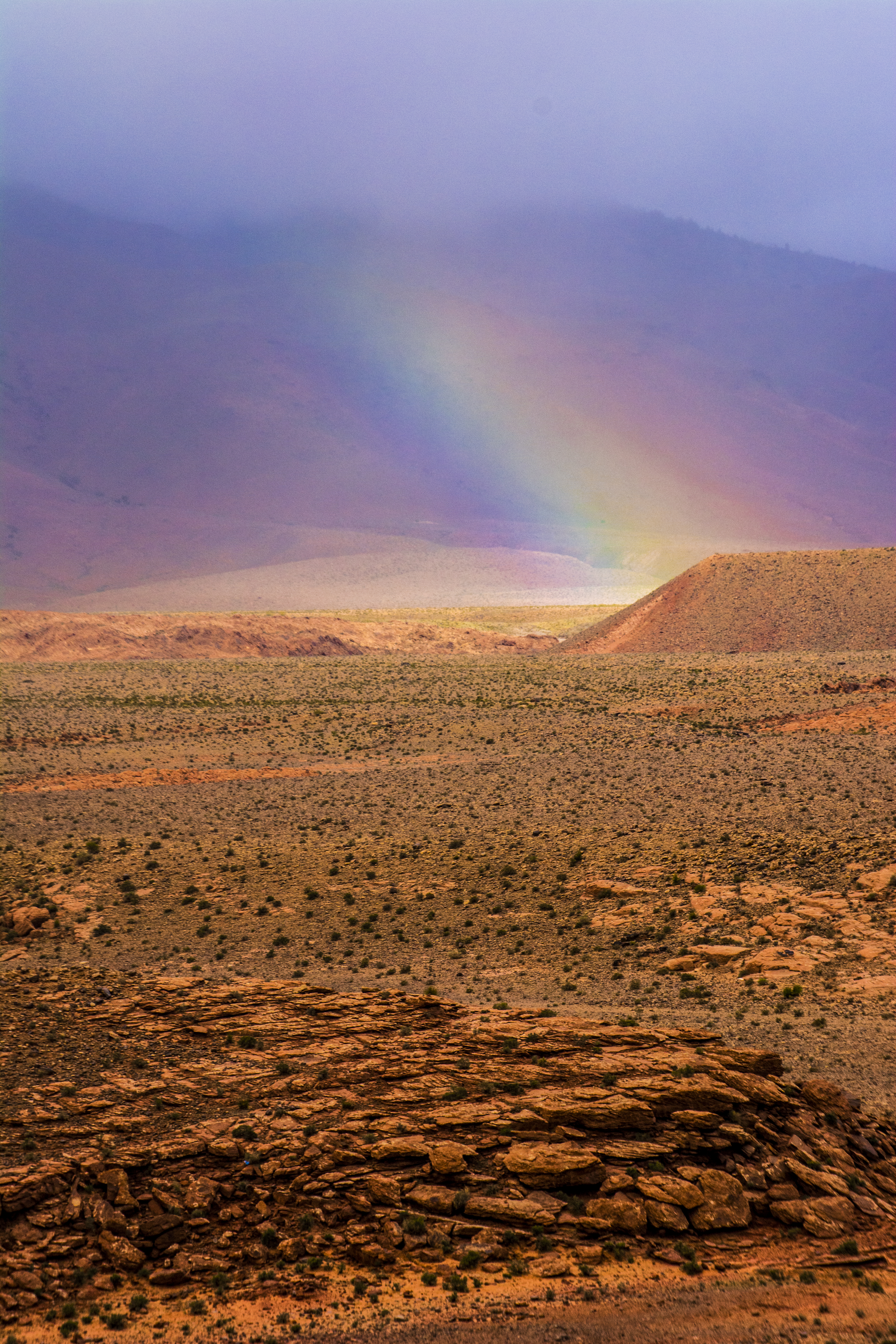
- The countryside of Tiout

- Location of Tiout within Naâma Province

- Location of Tiout within Algeria
- Coordinates: 32°46′N 0°25′W
- Country: Algeria
- Province: Naâma
- District: Aïn Séfra

Government
  - PMA Seats: 11
- Elevation: 992 m (3,255 ft)

Population (1998)
  - Total: 3,161
- Time zone: UTC+01 (CET)
- Postal code: 45210
- ONS code: 4504

Tiout (Arabic: تيوت) is a municipality in Naâma Province, Algeria. It is part of the district of Aïn Séfra and has a population of 3,161, which gives it 11 seats in the PMA. Its postal code is 45210 and its municipal code is 4504.

The origin of the word Tiout, is Amazigh. It is the plural of "tout" which means source. Tiout is located on the Saharan Atlas ksour mounts, 10km east of Aïn Sefra as an extension of RN 47, between Djebel Aïssa to the North West, Djebel Djara and Djebel Mekter to the South.

Tiout is located 40km from the thermal station Ain Ouarka, 45km from the tower (qalaa) of Chikh Bouamama, 40km from Sfessefa, 70km from Boussemghoun, and 50km from Aasla. It has an average altitude of 1000m. Tiout covers an area of 789.25km² and counts at the end of 2008 a population of 6657 inhabitants. The area is famous for its rock carvings. It has more than 54 stations.

== Geography ==
The fact that Tiout is surrounded by mountains gives it a microclimate with a temperature that does not exceed 38 degrees. There are ten days of freezing a year.

Tiout is characterized by its Oued.

=== Oasis ===
The oasis of Tiout has an area of 220 hectares. It has 71 varieties of dates including Fegous and Aghras.

=== Tiout dam ===
The Tiout dam is considered to be the first dam made in Africa (before 1300). Built of lime and stone, it is fed by a flow of rainwater from the two oases of Moghrar and Oued Rhaouiba. Since the drilling, water has become scarce in the dam.

=== Ksar of Tiout ===
The ksar of Tiout dates from 9 centuries. It was built on the outskirts of Ouedi Tiout on a plate that overlooks the stream with an average vertical drop of 8 m, which allows it to be protected from the ouedi raw. It is built in rocks extracted from Djbel Aïssa, palm derivatives (trunks, palms), clay as well as aggregates drained by the ouedi, on a surface which approximates 27,000m^{2}. Its development is from the bottom, near sources and gardens, to the top.

The ksar has three doors: Bab Sid Ahmed Ben Youcef, Bab Hlel (moon in English, the moon was observed by this door to announce the beginning of the Hegirian month), and Bab El Khmer. Two lead outwards and the third leads to the palm grove.

Women roamed the rooftops and terraces throughout the city while men moved through the alleys.

The Ksar had its own 3-century old Hammam, heated by a wood fire. The day reserved for women and the evening for men. The presence of public toilets dates back to 9 centuries. The alleys of ksar note aeration every 20 meters.

The Ksar has a mosque that dates back more than 4 centuries, with the particularity of the absence of minaret (Berber construction of the time of the Morabites dynasty).

The ksar was self-sufficient. He had in particular his ironworker (mainly producing agricultural tools). This one was paid in barter (fruits and vegetables).

The ksar is surrounded by an oasis. The presence of a tunnel served to carry water from the oases to the city during the wars.

=== Drinking water supply ===
The ksar of Tiout is equipped with three water supply processes: a secondary seguia of drinking water connected to the main seguia which crosses the ouedi; a direct feed from a very high flow source called Ain Messaoud; two wells dug inside the ksar for domestic needs.

=== Irrigation of the palm grove of the ksar ===
A system of two dams in series is used for the irrigation of the palm grove. A seguia with a length of 2 km arrives at the palm grove and the gardens. Collective madjens located at the highest point of the palm grove, store water and distribute it among farmers by the time division method.

In addition, two types of traditional wells have been introduced: the balance well for a depth of 3 to 6 meters, and animal traction for a depth of up to 20 m.

=== Communities ===
Tiout has 2 communities: the Amazighs inside the ksar, and the Arabs around the ksar.

The Amazigh community is run by the tajmâat (which means council or group), the Arab community is managed by the Sheikh (the old sage). The tajmâat and the sheikh are the authorities who organize the life and decisions of the communities.

== Languages ==
The languages spoken in Tiout are Arabic and the Amazigh dialect "Znati".
