= Moghrar =

Moghrar بلدية مغرار
- Municipality
- Commune of Moghrar
- Location of Moghrar within Naâma Province

- Location of Moghrar within Algeria
- Coordinates: 32°31′N 0°35′W
- Country: Algeria
- Province: Naâma
- District: Moghrar (seat)

Government
  - PMA Seats: 11
- Elevation: 1,113 m (3,652 ft)

Population (1998)
  - Total: 2,796
- Time zone: UTC+01 (CET)
- Postal code: 45230-45232
- ONS code: 4506

Moghrar (Arabic: مغرار) is a municipality in Naâma Province, Algeria. It is the district seat the Moghrar District and has a population of 2,796, which gives it 11 seats in the PMA. Its municipal code is 4506

Two distinct oases are to be considered: Moghrar Foukani or higher Moghrar, on the Algerian National Highway number 6, the chief town; and Moghrar Tahtani or lower Moghrar located 15 km northeast of the first locality.

== Postal codes ==
It has several postal codes for its various boroughs:

- Moghrar: 45230
- Moghrar Fougani (Upper Moghrar): 45231
- Moghrar Tahtani (Lower Moghrar): 45232

== Geography ==
Moghrar is located in the Ksour Range, western part of the Saharan Atlas on the western borders of Algeria, near the Moroccan border. Moghrar is limited to the north by Djebel Cheracher; to the east by Djebel Boulerhad and to the south-east by Djebel El Haïmeur, and by Djebel Touzamet the limit to the south.

The Moghrar valley has a large drainage basin draining the entire region of Ain Sefra.

It has a dry Saharan climate (about 100 mm / year) with a cold winter and winds that blow frequently from south-west to north-west. is in winter and spring. The vegetation surrounding the palm grove is a steppe.

=== Oases of Moghrar ===
The oases Moghrar Foukani and Moghrar Tahtani are characterized by regs, hamadas and wadis more or less dry. The two oases have more than sixty wells for the irrigation of the gardens of the palm grove. In addition, there is also the exploitation of the traditional system of foggaras sources (or foggara of Al Ain in Arabic) allowing a rational use of water. The foggaras are still functional and there are two of them.

=== Oued Moghrar ===
Oued Moghrar flows south and joins Oued Rhoubia which extends south to form Oued Namous with another tributary Oued Smar with many smaller wadis that arrive from the southern foothills of the Ksour Range.

== History ==
Man has been living in the area for a long time. There is a rock station at Moghrar Tahtani.

The ksar of this same city was the fief of an illustrious resistant to the French penetration in Algeria, Cheikh Bouamama.

== Flora and fauna ==
The flora is represented by the varieties of date palms Feggous and Aghrass, well preserved here while they have practically disappeared elsewhere. These varieties have the ability to be naturally preserved, exposed to the open air for a year.

We also note the presence of the following species: Hammada Scoparia, Retama raetum, Ephedra alata, Samolus valerandi and, at the edge of seguias or irrigation ditches, Adiantum capillus veneris.

As for the fauna, it is a refuge zone for gazelles and outardes houbaras.

Among the ornithological species that characterize theregion, we find: the Red crossbill Loxia curvirostra, the Common wood pigeon Columba palumbus, the Blue rock thrush Monticola solitarius, the Bee-eater Merops apiaster, the Hoopoe Upupa epops, the Short-toed snake eagle Circaetus gallicus, the Bonelli's Eagle Hieraêtus fasciatus, the Bearded vulture Cypaetus barbatus, and the Partridge Alectoris spatzi.

The migratory species are Woodchat shrike (Lanius senator), Orphean warbler (Sylvia hortensis), Bonelli's warbler (Phylloscopus bonelli), Gray flycatcher (Empidonax wrightii), the cuckoo, the turtledove.

According to the rock carvings of the region, the wildlife included Harte antelope, the gazelle, the antelope addax, the bee and the ostrich.

== Tourism ==
Tourism is currently underdeveloped but there is potential.

In addition to the palm grove and its irrigation system by foggaras, and the secular ksars, there is a rock carvings station at Moghrar Tahtani, a modest museum of prehistory as well as the zaouia of Sheikh Bouamama.
