= Aïn Ben Khelil =

Aïn Ben Khelil بلدية عين بن خليل
- Municipality
- Commune of Aïn Ben Khelil
- Location of Aïn Ben Khelil within Naâma Province

- Location of Aïn Ben Khelil within Algeria
- Coordinates: 33°17′24″N 0°45′50″W
- Country: Algeria
- Province: Naâma
- District: Mécheria

Government
  - PMA Seats: 7
- Elevation: 1,180 m (3,870 ft)

Population (1998)
  - Total: 6,270
- Time zone: UTC+01 (CET)
- Postal code: 45140
- ONS code: 4512

Aïn Ben Khelil (Arabic: عين بن خليل) is a town and commune in Naâma Province, Algeria. It is part of the district of Mécheria and has a population of 6,270, which gives it 7 seats in the PMA. Its postal code is 45140 and its municipal code is 4512.
