= Kasdir =

Kasdir بلدية القصدير
- Municipality
- Commune of Kasdir
- Location of Kasdir within Naâma Province

- Location of Kasdir within Algeria
- Coordinates: 33°42′35″N 1°21′30″W
- Country: Algeria
- Province: Naâma
- District: Mekmen Ben Amar

Government
  - PMA Seats: 7
- Elevation: 985 m (3,232 ft)

Population (1998)
  - Total: 1,820
- Time zone: UTC+01 (CET)
- Postal code: 45310
- ONS code: 4511

Kasdir (Arabic: القصدير or قصدير) is a municipality in Naâma Province, Algeria. It is part of the district of Mekmen Ben Amar and has a population of 1,820, which gives it 7 seats in the PMA. Its postal code is 45130 and its municipal code is 4511.
