= List of mountains in Algeria =

Algeria is a country with diverse topography, dominated by the Atlas Mountains and the Sahara Desert mountains. The mountain ranges date from the Late Archean to the Alpine periods. This geological structure is dictated by the convergence of the African and Eurasian tectonic plates.

This is a list of mountains in the country of Algeria.

Name	Range	Photograph	Height	Observations
Azao	Tassili n'Ajjer		2,158 metres (7,080 ft)	
Bou Zizi	Edough Massif (Tell Atlas)		1,008 metres (3,307 ft)	
Bouzegza	Khachna Massif (Tell Atlas)		1,083 metres (3,553 ft)	Highest point of Khachna range
Chélia	Aurès Mountains (Saharan Atlas)		2,328 metres (7,638 ft)	Highest point of Saharan Atlas
Choukchout	Bibans (Tell Atlas)		1,832 metres (6,010 ft)	
Djebel Aïssa	Ksour Range, (Saharan Atlas)		2,236 metres (7,336 ft)	
Djebel Fellaoucen	Tlemcen Mountains, (Tell Atlas)		1,136 metres (3,727 ft)	
Djebel Tenouchfi	Tlemcen Mountains, (Tell Atlas)		1,843 metres (6,047 ft)	
Garet el Djenoun	Teffedest Mountains		2,327 metres (7,635 ft)	
Guern Arif	Amour Range (Saharan Atlas)		1,721 metres (5,646 ft)	
In Akoulmou	Teffedest Mountains		2,359 metres (7,740 ft)	
Kef Siga	Ouarsenis Range (Tell Atlas)		1,784 metres (5,853 ft)	
Lalla Khedidja	Djurdjura (Tell Atlas)		2,308 metres (7,572 ft)	Highest point of the Tell Atlas
Mansoura	Bibans (Tell Atlas)		1,862 metres (6,109 ft)	
Mount Babor	Babor Range (Tell Atlas)		2,004 metres (6,575 ft)	
Pic des Singes	Tell Atlas		0,400 metres (1,300 ft)	
Ras El Braret	Ouarsenis Range (Tell Atlas)		1,787 metres (5,863 ft)	
Rajaouna	Tell Atlas		650 metres (2,130 ft)	
Rond Point des Cèdres	Ouarsenis Range (Tell Atlas)		1,461 metres (4,793 ft)	
Sidi Amar	Ouarsenis Range (Tell Atlas)		1,985 metres (6,512 ft)	
Tahat	Hoggar		2,908 metres (9,541 ft)	Highest point in Algeria
Tessala	Tessala Range (Tell Atlas)		1,061 metres (3,481 ft)	
Valva				Ancient name for mountain in Roman province of Mauretania Caesariensis
Yemma Gouraya	Djurdjura (Tell Atlas)		660 metres (2,170 ft)	
Zaccar	Dahra Range (Tell Atlas)		1,550 metres (5,090 ft)	

== See also ==
- Ahaggar Mountains
- Teffedest Mountains
- Khachna Mountains
