= Mount Issa =

Mountain in Naâma, Algeria

Mount Issa (Djebel Aïssa)
- جبل عيسى
- Location within Algeria

Highest point
- Elevation: 2,236 m (7,336 ft)
- Listing: List of mountains in Algeria
- Coordinates: 32.911667°N 0.467639°W

Geography
- Location: Naâma, Algeria
- Parent range: Ksour Range, Saharan Atlas

Mount Issa or Djebel Aïssa (Arabic: جبل عيسى) is a 2,236 m high mountain in western Algeria, thus the 4th highest in Algeria. It is part of the Ksour Range of the Saharan Atlas, within the larger Atlas Mountain System. Mount Issa is located in the Naâma Province and is one of the main summits of the Saharan Atlas.

The Djebel Aissa National Park is a protected area within the area of the mountain since 2003.

== See also ==
- List of mountains in Algeria
- Saharan Atlas
