= Djebel Smail Laaouaj =

Mountain in Algeria

Djebel Smail Laaouadj
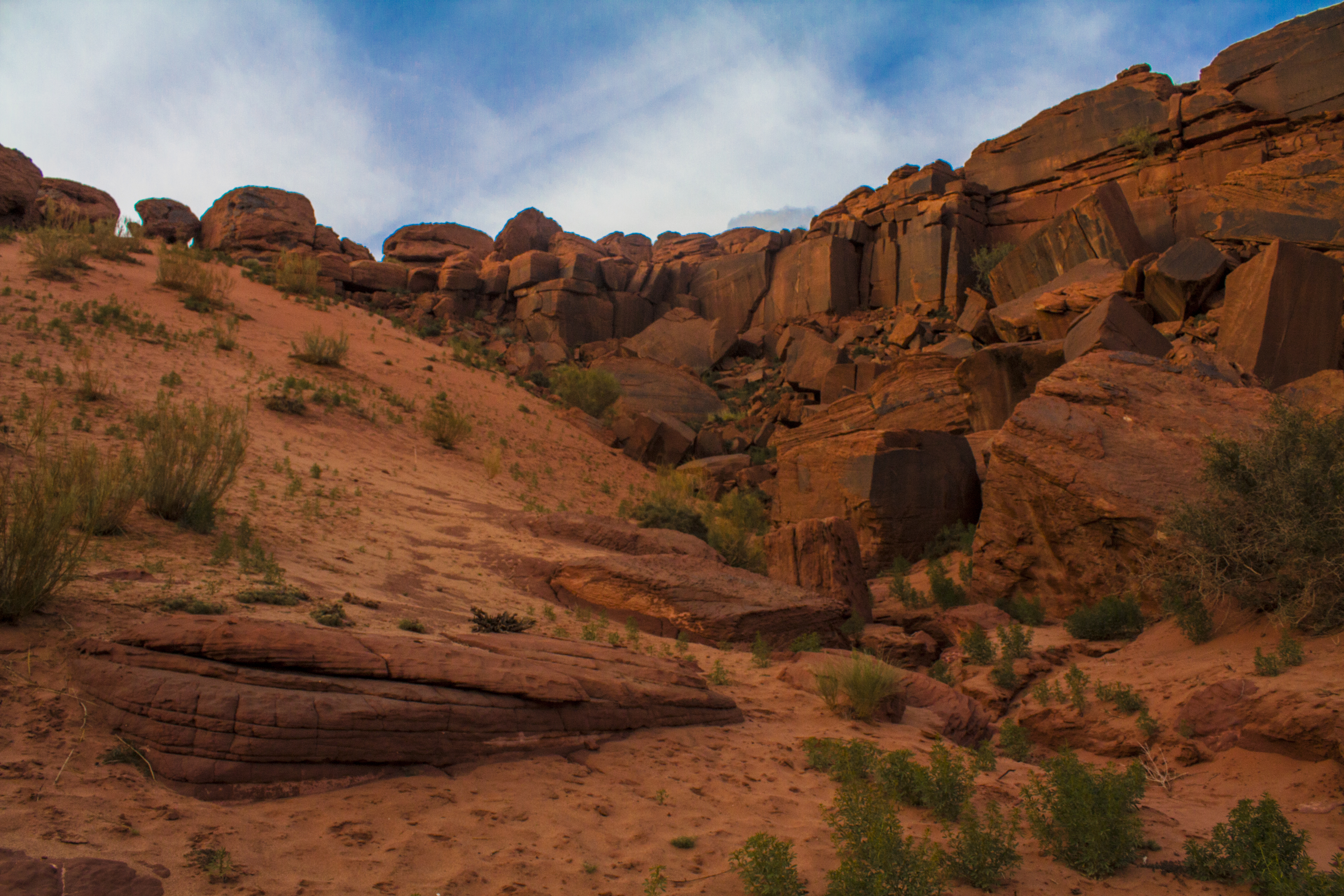
- Djebel Smail Laaouadj

Geography
- Location: Algeria

Djebel Smail Laaouaj (Arabic: جبل اسماعيل لعوج) is a mountain located in the valley bounded by Djebel Aissa, in the wilaya of Naâma, a few kilometers from Ain Sefra.
