= Djéniane Bourzeg =

Djéniane Bourezg بلدية جنيان بورزاق
- Municipality
- Commune of Djéniane Bourezg
- Location of Djéniane Bourezg within Naâma Province

- Location of Djéniane Bourezg within Algeria
- Coordinates: 32°22′N 0°49′W
- Country: Algeria
- Province: Naâma
- District: Moghrar

Government
  - PMA Seats: 11
- Elevation: 1,087 m (3,566 ft)

Population (1998)
  - Total: 2,301
- Time zone: UTC+01 (CET)
- Postal code: 45240
- ONS code: 4508

Djéniane Bourezg (Arabic: جنيان بورزاق) is a municipality in Naâma Province, Algeria. It is part of the district of Moghrar and has a population of 2,301, which gives it 11 seats in the PMA. Its postal code is 45240 and its municipal code is 4508.
