= Ksour Range =

Mountain range in Algeria

- جبال القصور
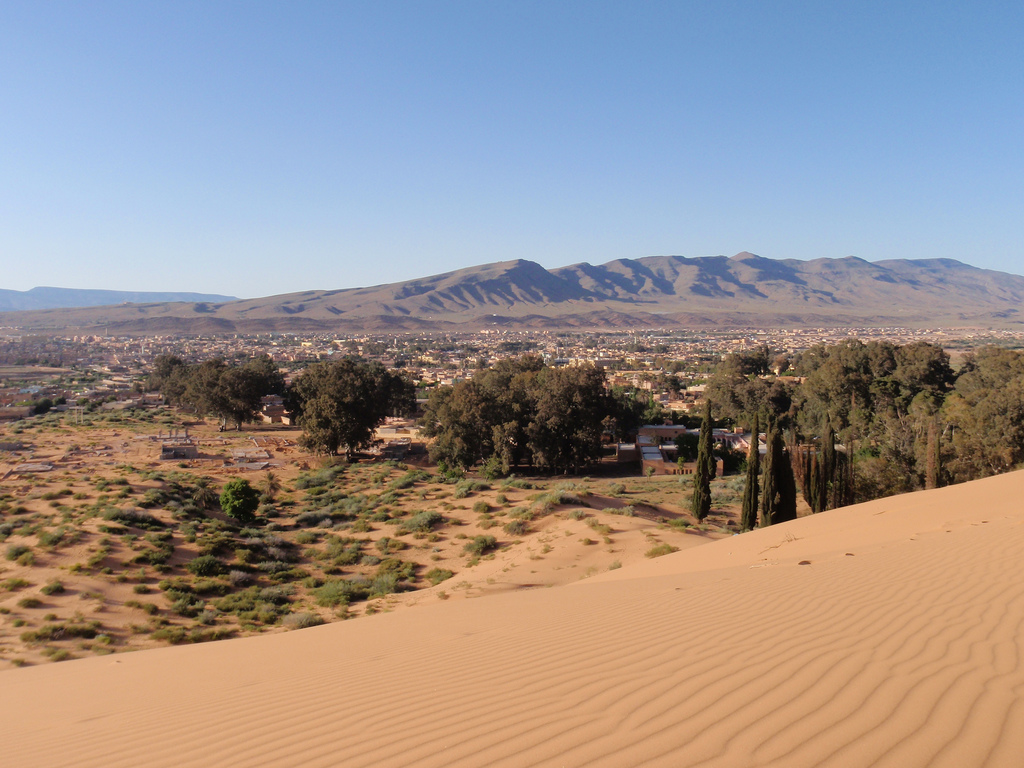
- View of the Ksour Range from near Ain Sefra

Highest point
- Peak: Mount Issa
- Elevation: 2,236 m (7,336 ft)
- Coordinates: 32°52′0″N 0°29′0″E

Geography
- Location within Algeria
- Countries: Algeria and Morocco
- Parent range: Saharan Atlas

The Ksour Range or Kçour Range (Arabic: جبال القصور, or Djebel Ksour) is a mountain range in Algeria. Stretching across the provinces of Béchar and El Bayadh, it is the westernmost range of the Saharan Atlas, with the Amour Range further east.

== Geography ==
The range extends between Figuig Province in the Oriental Region of Morocco near the Moroccan/Algerian border and El Bayadh municipality in Algeria. The range pattern continues westwards as the High Atlas. The highest summit of the range is 2,236 m high Mount Issa or Djebel Aïssa (جبل عيسى).

== Rock art ==
Neolithic art, in the form of engraved stones representing horses, elephants and other animals, is found in different caves and walls throughout the range (such as at Thyout).

== Protected areas ==
The Djebel Aissa National Park is a protected area within the limits of the mountain range since 2003.

== Features ==
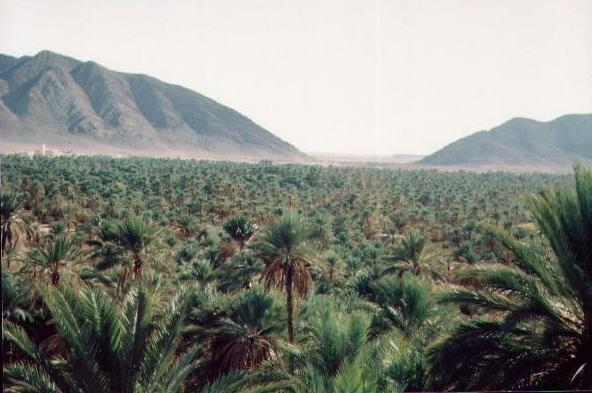
Western foothills of the Ksour Range near Figuig

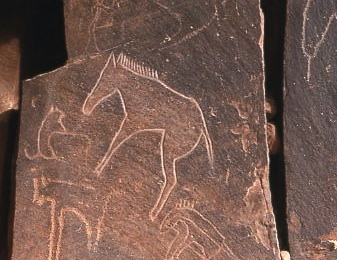
Neolithic rock engravings near Ain Sefra.

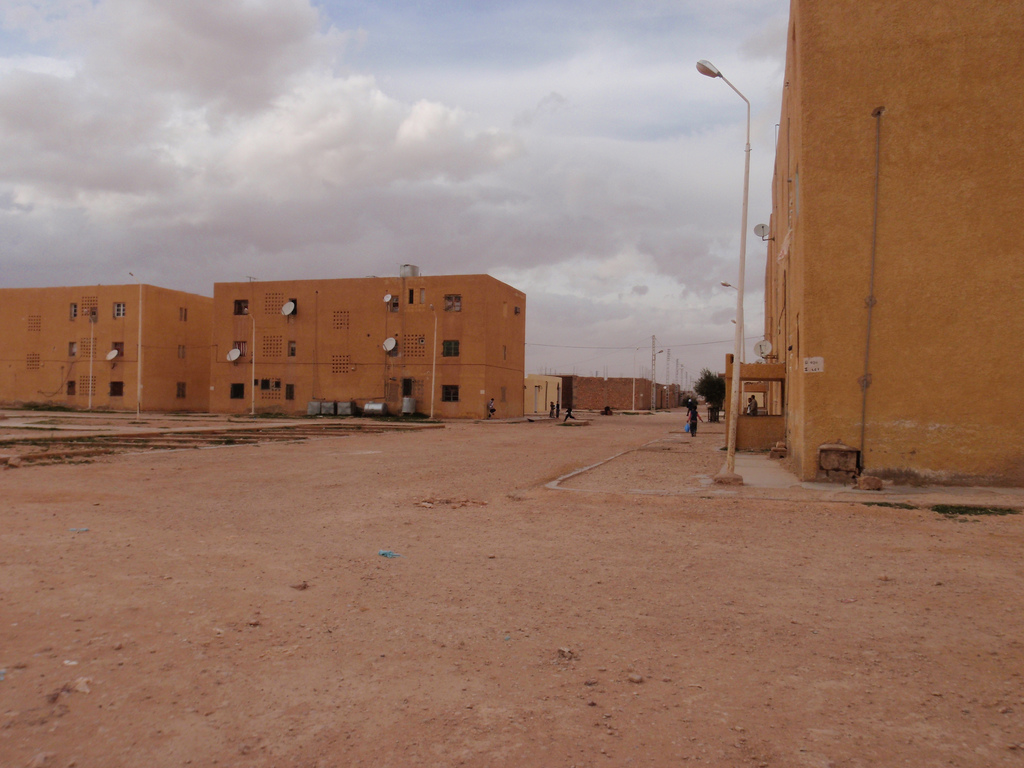
Street in El Abiodh Sidi Cheikh, a town located below the southern slopes of the range.

== See also ==
- List of mountains in Algeria
- Saharan Atlas
