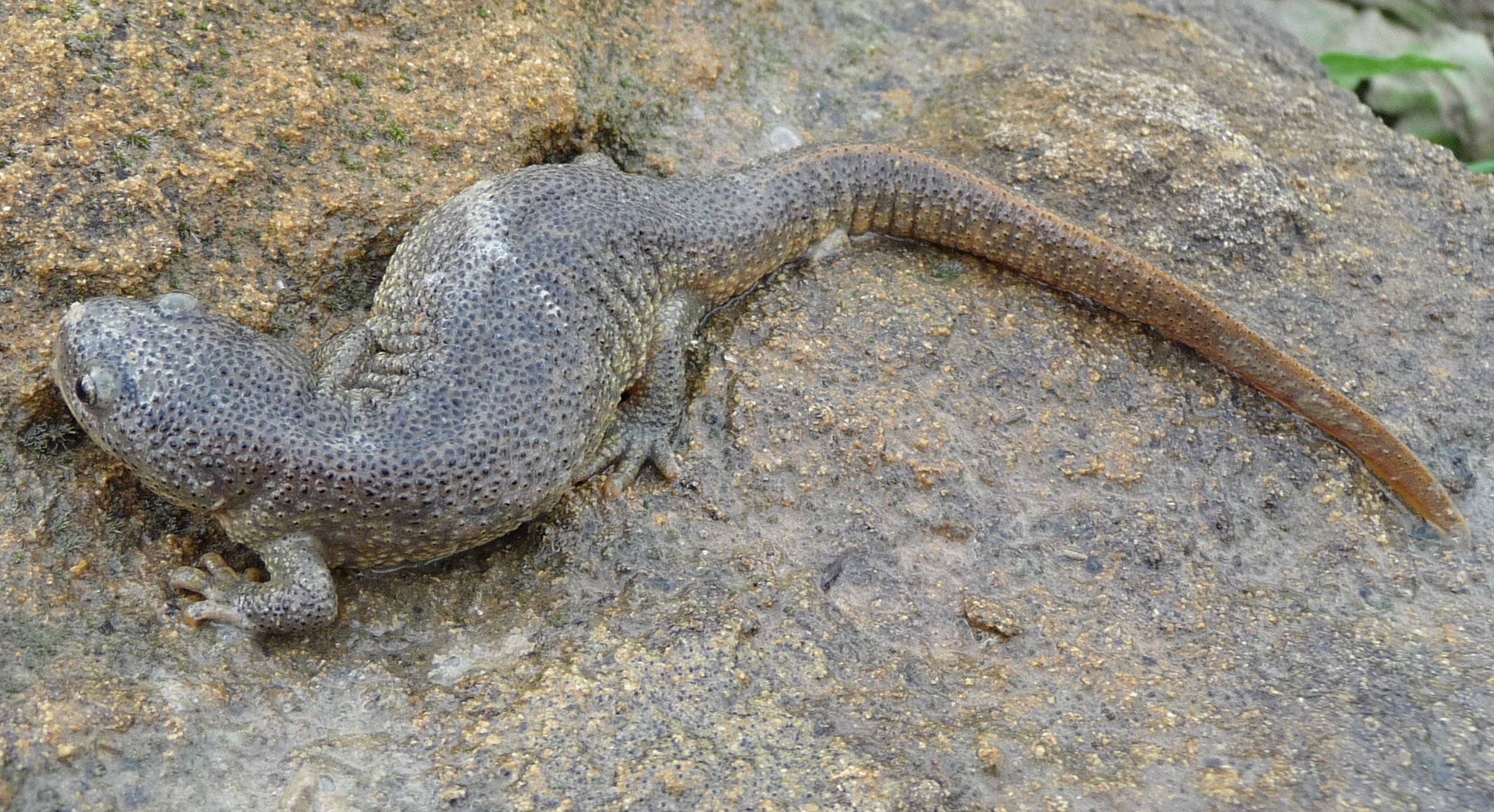
- Wild Pleurodeles nebulosus in Tunisia

Conservation status
- Least Concern (IUCN 3.1)

Scientific classification
- Kingdom: Animalia
- Phylum: Chordata
- Class: Amphibia
- Order: Urodela
- Family: Salamandridae
- Genus: Pleurodeles
- Species: P. nebulosus

Binomial name
- Pleurodeles nebulosus (Guichenot, 1850)

= Algerian ribbed newt =

Species of salamander

The Algerian ribbed newt (Pleurodeles nebulosus) is a species of salamander in the family Salamandridae found in Algeria and Tunisia. The natural habitats of this newt are rivers, intermittent rivers, swamps, cisterns, freshwater marshes, intermittent freshwater marshes, and ponds. It is threatened by habitat destruction.

== Taxonomy ==
Formerly, this species was confused with Pleurodeles poireti. Carranza and Wade (2004) found out that most North African Pleurodeles species that had previously been referred to as P. poireti were in fact Pleurodeles nebulosus, an altogether different species. The true P. poireti newts are found only on the Edough Massif, in northeast Algeria.

== Description ==
The Algerian ribbed newt is a medium-sized species growing to a length of about 23 cm (9 in). The head is flattened and has small eyes and a rounded snout. The body is somewhat flattened and the tail of the male is longer than that of the female. In the breeding season, fins grow above and below the tail. The colour is olive-brown above blotched with darker patches, the flanks are yellowish and the underparts are pale grey, often with darker spots. The skin of the upper parts is very granular.

== Status ==
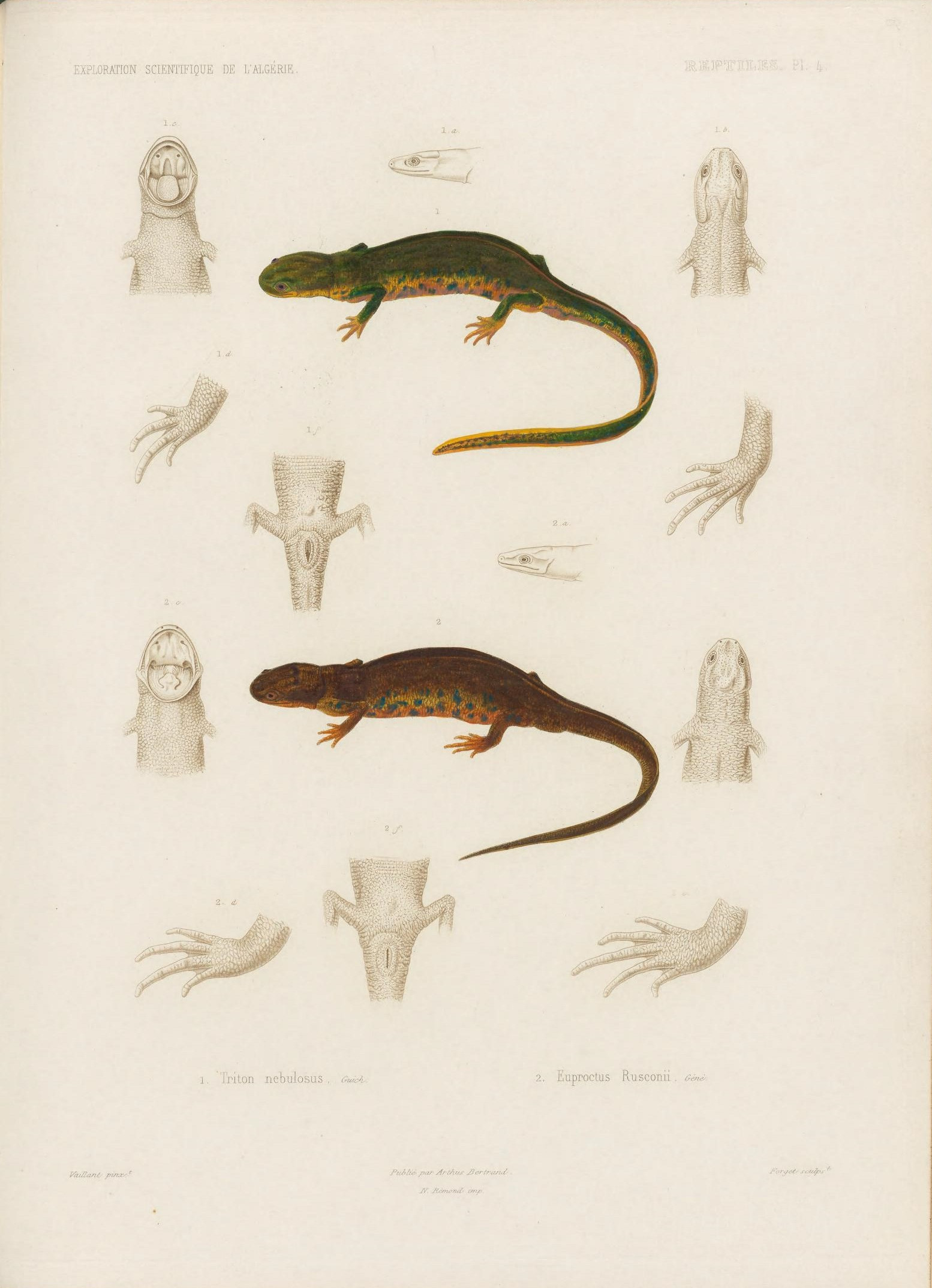
Triton nebulosus from Algeria (1850)

The Algerian ribbed newt has a restricted range in northeastern Algeria and western Tunisia. It lives and breeds in freshwater habitats such as marshes, ponds, streams and cisterns. The main threats it faces are pollution of its environment and habitat destruction as the land is put to greater agricultural uses, especially increased grazing by livestock. The International Union for Conservation of Nature has assessed its conservation status as "least concern".
