= El Biodh =

El Biodh بلدية البيوض
- Municipality
- Commune of El Biodh
- Location of El Biodh within Naâma Province

- Location of El Biodh within Algeria
- Coordinates: 33°46′N 0°08′W
- Country: Algeria
- Province: Naâma
- District: Mécheria

Government
  - PMA Seats: 7
- Elevation: 1,036 m (3,399 ft)

Population (1998)
  - Total: 3,776
- Time zone: UTC+01 (CET)
- Postal code: 45110
- ONS code: 4509

El Biodh (Arabic: البيوض) is a municipality in Naâma Province, Algeria. It is part of Mécheria District and has a population of 3.776, which gives it 7 seats in the PMA. Its postal code is 45110 and its municipal code is 4509.
