= Sfissifa =

Sfissifa صفيصيفة
- Municipality
- Sfissifa
- Location of Sfissifa within Naâma Province

- Location of Sfissifa within Algeria
- Coordinates: 32°44′N 0°52′W
- Country: Algeria
- Province: Naâma (seat)
- District: Sfissifa (coextensive)

Government
  - PMA Seats: 7

Area
  - Total: 2,347.5 km^{2} (906.4 sq mi)
- Elevation: 1,222 m (4,009 ft)

Population (1998)
  - Total: 2,633
  - Density: 1.122/km^{2} (2.905/sq mi)
- Time zone: UTC+01 (CET)
- Postal code: 45220
- ONS code: 4505

Sfissifa (Arabic: صفيصيفة) is a municipality in Naâma Province, Algeria. It is coextensive with the district of Sfissifa and has a population of 2,633, which gives it 7 seats in the PMA. Its postal code is 45220 and its municipal code is 4505.
