= CNRP =

CNRP may refer to:

- Carbon nanotube reinforced polymer, a type of composite, a plastic with carbon nanotube reinforcement
- Cambodia National Rescue Party, a former major Cambodian political party of Cambodia
- Algerian National Commission for the Census of the Population (CNRP; French: Commissariat national pour le recensement de la population), former name of Algeria's National Office of Statistics
