= Valva (disambiguation) =

Valva may refer to:

In geography:

- Valva (city), an ancient city in L'Aquila province, Italy
- Valva (mountain), a mountain in North Africa
- Valva, Campania, a commune in Salerno province, Italy

In biology:

- Valva, a clasping structure in some animals
- Valva (moth), a genus of moths in the family Pyralidae
