= Djebel Bou Amoud =

Mountain in Algeria

- Location within Algeria

Highest point
- Elevation: 1,692 m (5,551 ft)
- Coordinates: 32°23′10″N 0°39′53″W

Geography
- Location: Algeria

Djebel Bou Amoud is a mountain in the west of Algeria. It is located in the wilaya of Naâma, 600 km southwest of the capital, Algiers.

The climate is desertic and cold. The average annual temperature in the surrounding area is 22 °C. The hottest month is July, with an average temperature of 33 °C, and the coldest, January, with a temperature of 10 °C. The average annual precipitation is 270 millimeters. The month of most precipitation is November, with an average rainfall of 80 millimeters, and the driest month is June, with 2 millimeters.
