= Djebel Cheracher =

Mountain in Algeria

- Location within Algeria

Highest point
- Elevation: 1,721 m (5,646 ft)
- Coordinates: 32°38′25″N 0°26′58″W

Geography
- Location: Algeria

Djebel Cheracher is a mountain in Algeria. It is located in the wilaya of Naâma, in the north-west of the country, at 600 km southwest of the capital Algiers. The summit of Djebel Cheracher has an altitude of 1721 meters, which is 421 meters above the surrounding terrain. Its base has a width of 7 km.

The terrain around Djebel Cheracher is mainly hilly, but to the southeast, it is flat. The nearest highest peak is Râs ech Chergui, with its elevation of 2053 meters. It is located at 10 km. The surroundings of Djebel Cheracher are very sparsely populated, with 4 inhabitants per square kilometer. The nearest town is Aïn Sefra, 17.5 km away. The surroundings of Djebel Cheracher are essentially an open landscape of bush.

The average annual temperature is 21 degrees. The hottest month is July, with an average temperature of 32 degrees, and the coldest in January with 10 degrees}. The average annual rainfall is 290 mm. The wettest month is November, with average precipitation of 89 mm, and the driest in June, with 5 mm.
