= Asla, Algeria =

Asla عسلة
- Municipality
- Commune of Asla
- Location of Asla within Naâma Province

- Location of Asla within Algeria
- Coordinates: 33°01′N 0°05′W
- Country: Algeria
- Province: Naâma
- District: Asla

Government
  - PMA Seats: 7

Population (1998)
  - Total: 4,784
- Time zone: UTC+01 (CET)
- Postal code: 45220
- ONS code: 4507

Asla (Arabic: عسلة, from Arabic "Assel", lit. honey) is a municipality in Naâma Province, Algeria. It is coextensive with the district of Asla and has a population of 4,784, which gives it 7 seats in the PMA. Its postal code is 45250 and its municipal code is 4507.
