= Djebel Aissa National Park =

National park in western Algeria

- IUCN category II (national park)
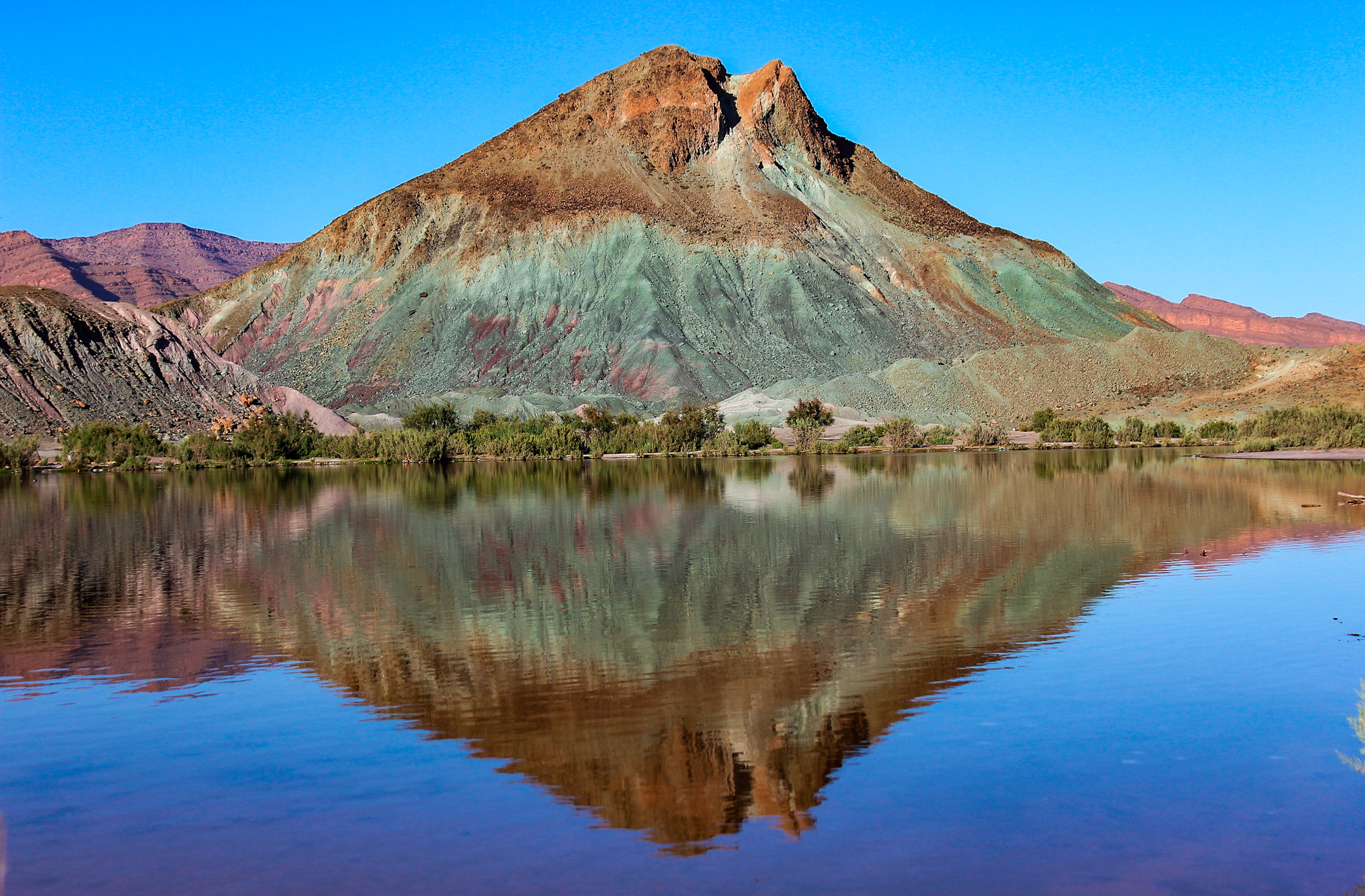
- Interactive map of Djebel Aissa National Park
- Location: Algeria - Naâma
- Nearest city: Ain Sefra
- Coordinates: 32°52′23″N 0°29′10″E
- Area: 244 km^{2} (94 sq mi)
- Established: 2003
- Administrator: Ministry of Spatial Planning and Environment

Djebel Aissa National Park (in Arabic: الحظيرة الوطنية لجبل عيسى) is a national park of the Saharan Atlas located in the west of Algeria, in the Hauts Plateaux. Created in 2003 and covering 24400 hectares, Djebel Aissa National Park is of particular importance in preserving the ecosystem of the Western Highlands region, which is threatened by desertification and silting.

It is in the wilaya of Naâma.

== Flora and fauna ==
=== Flora ===
The most represented trees are: the Ziziphus, the Pistacia, the Juniperus phoenicea, the Quercus ilex, the Juniperus oxycedrus and the Pinus halepensis. There is also the Stipa tenacissima, the Esparto grass and the Artemisia alba.

=== Fauna ===
The park is home to the following mammal species: the Hare, the Wild Boar, the Jackal, the Fox, the Bustard, the Porcupine, the Barbary sheep, and the Dorcas gazelle.
