= Mekmen Ben Amar District =

Mekmen Ben Amar District دائرة مكمن بن عمار
- District
- Map of Algeria highlighting Naâma Province
- Country: Algeria
- Province: Naâma
- District seat: Mekmen Ben Amar

Population (1998)
  - Total: 5,478
- Time zone: UTC+01 (CET)
- Municipalities: 2

Mekmen Ben Amar is a district in Naâma Province, Algeria. It was named after its capital, Mekmen Ben Amar.

== Municipalities ==
The district is further divided into 2 municipalities:

- Mekmen Ben Amar
- Kasdir
