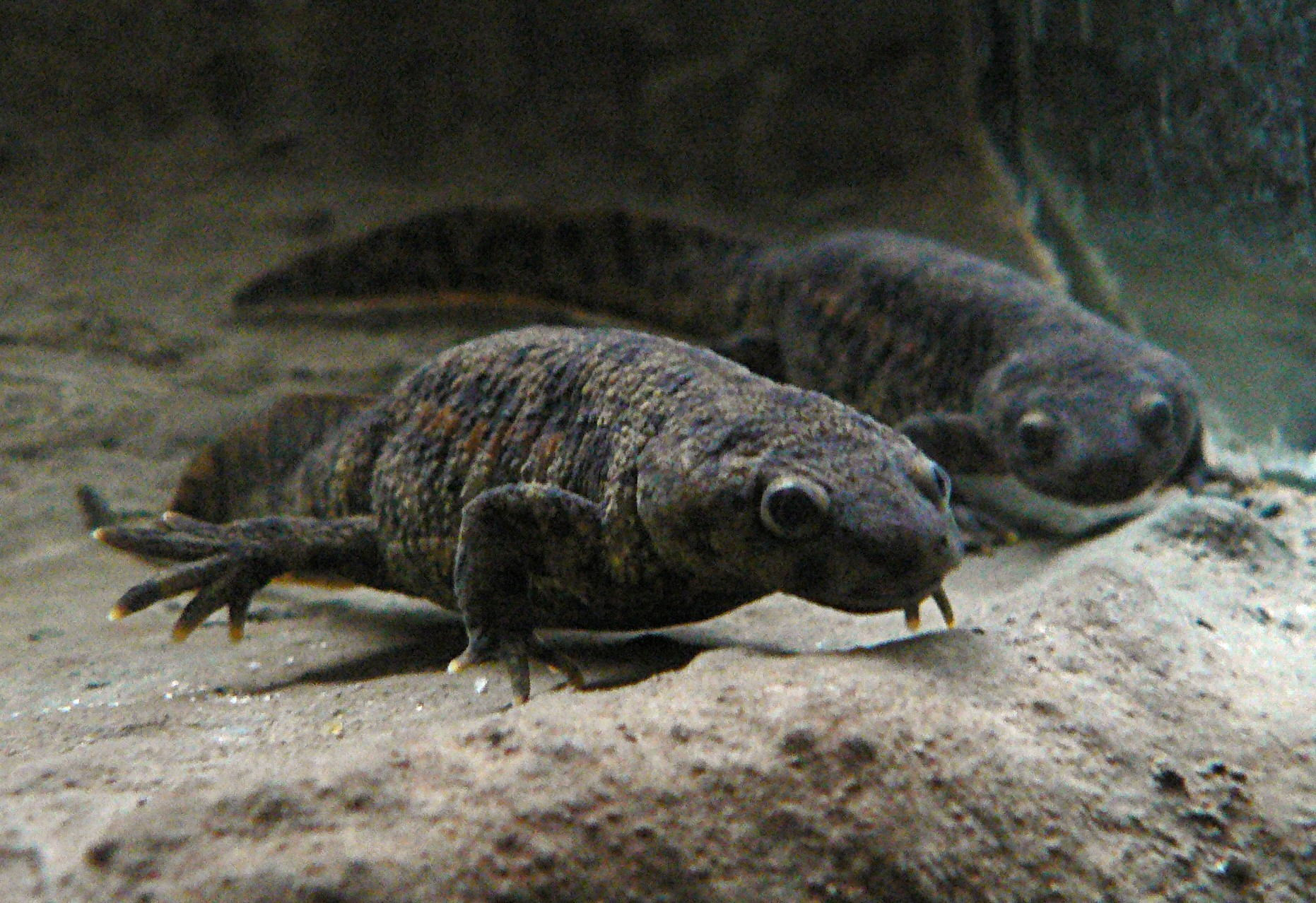
- Iberian ribbed newt (Pleurodeles waltl)

Scientific classification
- Kingdom: Animalia
- Phylum: Chordata
- Class: Amphibia
- Order: Urodela
- Family: Salamandridae
- Subfamily: Pleurodelinae
- Genus: Pleurodeles; Michahelles, 1830

Species
- Pleurodeles nebulosus Pleurodeles poireti Pleurodeles waltl

= Pleurodeles =

Genus of amphibians

Pleurodeles is a genus of three species, the ribbed newts:

| Image | Scientific name | Common name | Distribution |
|---|---|---|---|
| | Pleurodeles nebulosus | Algerian ribbed newt | Algeria and Tunisia. |
| | Pleurodeles poireti | Edough ribbed newt | north east of Algeria. |
| | Pleurodeles waltl | Iberian ribbed newt | central and southern Iberian Peninsula and Morocco. |

The Iberian ribbed newt is the most common of the three species, and the most frequently used as a model organism by scientists. However, its numbers in the wild are declining, and in 2006 it became a near threatened species. The other two species are in fact threatened, with P. nebulosus considered vulnerable to extinction and P. poireti classified as an endangered species. The numbers of all three species are declining in the wild. Livestock agriculture is an ongoing major cause of habitat loss and degradation, and of water pollution, for all three species.
