= Mekmen Ben Amar =

Mekmen Ben Amar بلدية مكمن بن عمار
- Municipality
- Commune of Mekmen Ben Amar
- Location of Mekmen Ben Amar within Naâma Province

- Location of Mekmen Ben Amar within Algeria
- Coordinates: 33°43′N 0°44′W
- Country: Algeria
- Province: Naâma
- District: Mekmen Ben Amar (seat)

Government
  - PMA Seats: 7
- Elevation: 1,074 m (3,524 ft)

Population (1998)
  - Total: 3,658
- Time zone: UTC+01 (CET)
- Postal code: 45120
- ONS code: 4510

Mekmen Ben Amar (Arabic: مكمن بن عمار) is a municipality in Naâma Province, Algeria. It is the district seat the district of Mekmen Ben Amar and has a population of 3,658, which gives it 7 seats in the PMA. Its postal code is 45120 and its municipal code is 4510.
