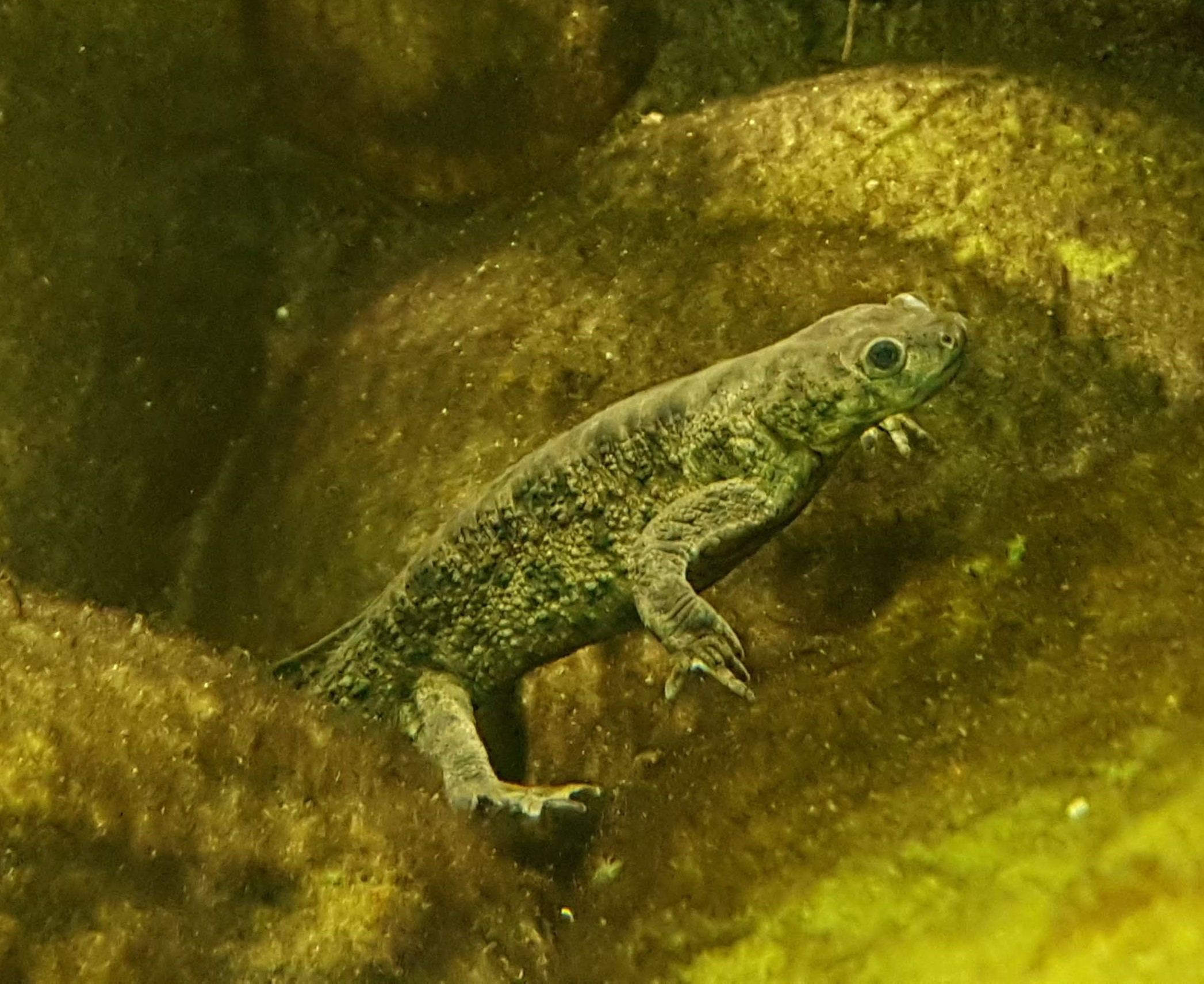

Conservation status
- Endangered (IUCN 3.1)

Scientific classification
- Kingdom: Animalia
- Phylum: Chordata
- Class: Amphibia
- Order: Urodela
- Family: Salamandridae
- Genus: Pleurodeles
- Species: P. poireti

Binomial name
- Pleurodeles poireti (Gervais, 1836)

= Pleurodeles poireti =

Species of amphibian

Pleurodeles poireti, the Edough ribbed newt or Poiret's newt, is a species of salamander in the family Salamandridae. It is found only in the Edough Massif, in the north east of Algeria, it is one of only four species of salamanders in Africa.

The natural habitats are of these newts are rivers, intermittent rivers, swamps, freshwater marshes, intermittent freshwater marshes, cisterns and ponds. They are threatened by habitat loss.

The true P. poireti newts are restricted to the Edough Massif area, in Numidia. Formerly, this species was confused with the Algerian ribbed newt Pleurodeles nebulosus, which has a much wider distribution.
