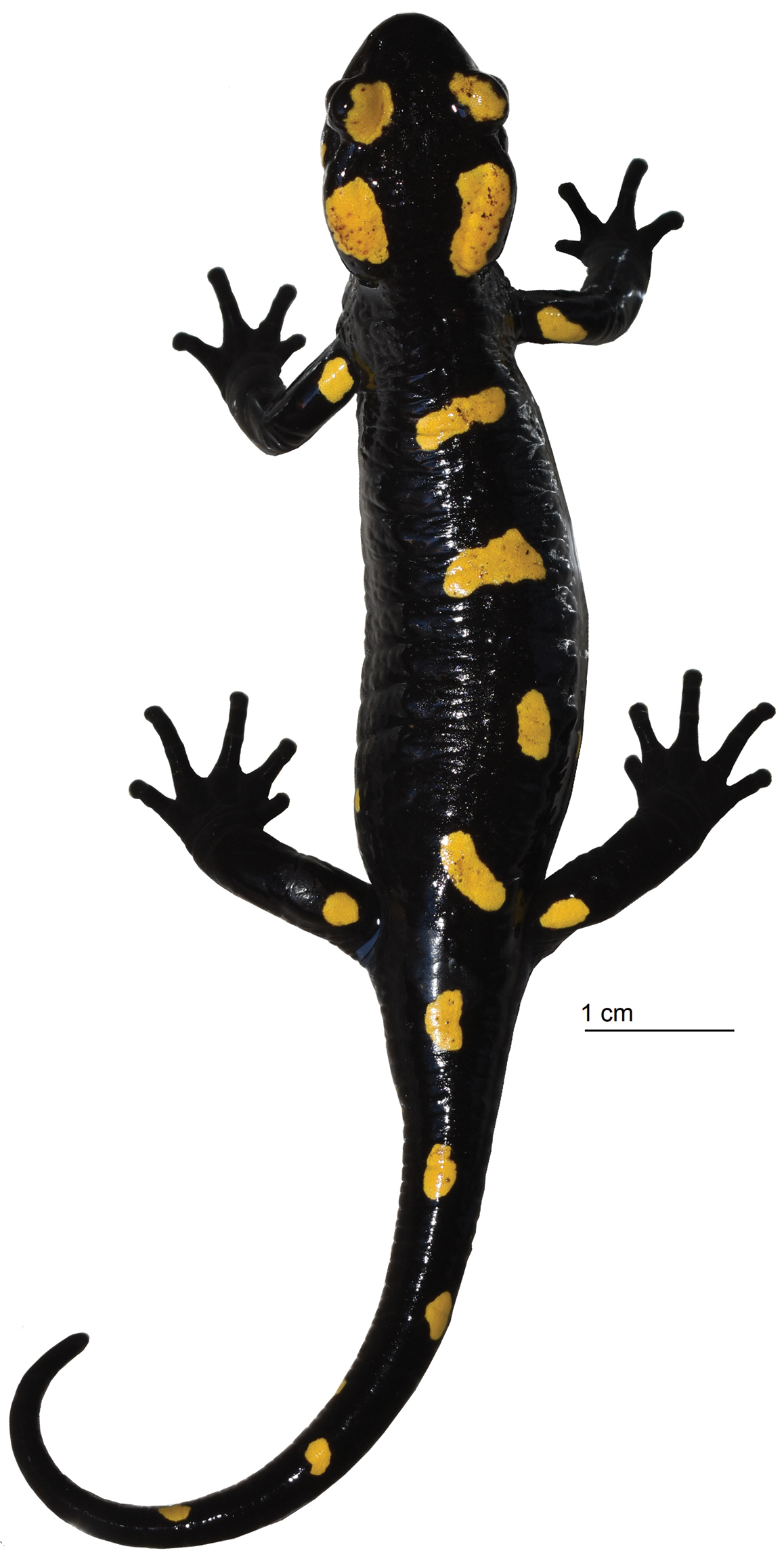

Conservation status
- Vulnerable (IUCN 3.1)

Scientific classification
- Kingdom: Animalia
- Phylum: Chordata
- Class: Amphibia
- Order: Urodela
- Family: Salamandridae
- Genus: Salamandra
- Species: S. algira

Binomial name
- Salamandra algira Bedriaga, 1883

Synonyms
- List: Salamandra maculosa var. algira Bedriaga, 1883; Salamandra salamandra algira Nikolskii, 1918; Salamandra algira Veith, 1996; Salamandra algira algira Donaire-Barroso and Bogaerts, 2003; Salamandra algira tingitana Donaire-Barroso and Bogaerts, 2003; Salamandra algira spelaea Escoriza and Comas, 2007; Salamandra (Algiandra) algira algira Dubois and Raffaëlli, 2009; Salamandra (Algiandra) algira spelaea Dubois and Raffaëlli, 2009; Salamandra (Algiandra) tingitana Dubois and Raffaëlli, 2009; Salamandra algira splendens Beukema, de Pous, Donaire-Barroso, Bogaerts, Garcia-Porta, Escoriza, Arribas, El Mouden, and Carranza, 2013; Salamandra algira atlantica Hernandez and Escoriza, 2019; Salamandra (Salamandra) algira algira Raffaëlli, 2020; Salamandra (Salamandra) algira atlantica Raffaëlli, 2020; Salamandra (Salamandra) algira spelaea Raffaëlli, 2020; Salamandra (Salamandra) algira splendens Raffaëlli, 2020; Salamandra (Salamandra) algira tingitana Raffaëlli, 2020

= North African fire salamander =

Species of amphibian

The North African fire salamander (Salamandra algira) is a species of salamander in the family Salamandridae found in Algeria, Morocco, Ceuta, and possibly Tunisia. Its natural habitats are temperate forests, rivers, and caves. It is threatened by habitat loss.

== Subspecies ==
The following subspecies from the following locales were described:

- S. a. algira Mount Edough (Algeria)-Neotype
- S. a. tingitana Jebel Mousa (Morocco)
- S. a. spelaea Ouartass, Beni Snassen (Morocco)
- S. a. splendens Aïn Tissimilan, Jebel el Kelaâ (Morocco)
- S. a. atlantica Jbel Tazekka (Morocco)

== Distribution and habitat ==
The North African fire salamander is endemic to northwestern Africa where it is found only in the Rif Mountains and Middle Atlas Mountains in northern Morocco, the Spanish enclave of Ceuta, and the coastal mountains of northern Algeria. A museum specimen is labeled to be from northern Tunisia, but the species has not yet been confirmed there. Its altitudinal range is from 80 m (260 ft) to about 2,450 m (8,040 ft). Its habitat is typically the floor of moist forests of oak and cedar where it hides under roots and stones. It is also known from caves.

== Ecology ==
Over most of its range, the North African fire salamander is ovoviviparous with eight to 50 eggs per batch, females retaining the eggs internally until they hatch, with the young being nurtured from the egg yolks. However, the Tingitana population are considered viviparous as the young, at least in part, seem to obtain their nourishment from the female in the form of secreted fluids. This results in fifteen or so larvae which are deposited in streams or pools.

== Status ==
Although locally common in places, the North African fire salamander is rare in others and has a fragmented distribution range. The main threat it faces is the destruction of its forest habitat. Other threats include the channelling of the forest streams for irrigation, overgrazing by livestock, and collection of the salamanders for the pet trade. The International Union for Conservation of Nature has assessed its conservation status as being "vulnerable".

== Sources ==
- Donaire-Barroso, D., Martinez-Solano, I., Salvador, A., Garcia-Paris, M., Gil, E.R., Tahar, S. & El Mouden, E.H. 2004.
