= Aïn Séfra District =

Aïn Séfra District دائرة عين الصفراء
- District
- Map of Algeria highlighting Naâma Province
- Country: Algeria
- Province: Naâma
- District seat: Aïn Séfra

Population (1998)
  - Total: 38,123
- Time zone: UTC+01 (CET)
- Municipalities: 2

Aïn Séfra is a district in Naâma Province, Algeria. It was named after its capital, Aïn Séfra.

== Municipalities ==
The district is further divided into 2 municipalities:

- Aïn Séfra
- Tiout
