= Moghrar District =

Coordinates: 32.5179°N 0.5804°W

Moghrar District دائرة مغرار
- District
- Map of Algeria highlighting Naâma Province
- Country: Algeria
- Province: Naâma
- District seat: Moghrar

Area
  - Total: 2,861 km^{2} (1,105 sq mi)

Population (1998)
  - Total: 5,097
  - Density: 1.782/km^{2} (4.614/sq mi)
- Time zone: UTC+01 (CET)
- Municipalities: 2

Moghrar is a district in Naâma Province, Algeria. It was named after its capital, Moghrar.

== Municipalities ==
The district is further divided into 2 municipalities:

- Moghrar
- Djeniane Bourzeg
