= Mécheria District =

- District
- Map of Algeria highlighting Naâma Province
- Country: Algeria
- District seat: Mécheria

Population (1998)
  - Total: 62,944
- Time zone: UTC+01 (CET)
- Municipalities: 3

Mécheria (Arabic: المشرية) is a district in Naâma Province, Algeria. It was named after its capital, Mécheria.

== Municipalities ==
The district is further divided into 3 municipalities:

- Mécheria
- Aïn Ben Khelil
- El Biodh
