= Amour Range =

Algerian mountain range

- جبال العمور
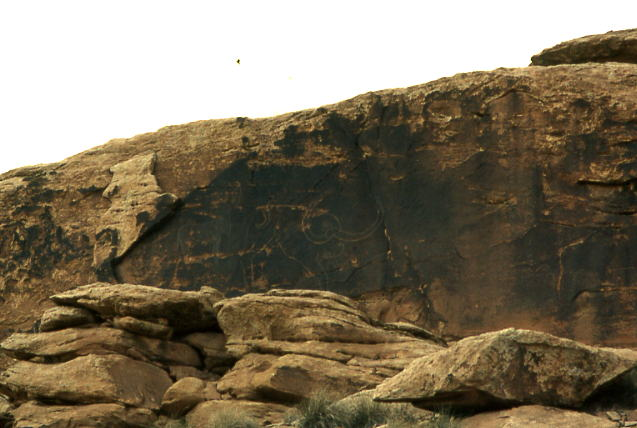
- Neolithic art in Aflou

Highest point
- Peak: Djebel Ksel
- Elevation: 2,008 m (6,588 ft)
- Coordinates: 34°03′0″N 2°04′0″E

Dimensions
- Length: 130 km (81 mi) ENE/WSW
- Width: 40 km (25 mi) NNW/SSE
- Area: 7,710 km^{2} (2,980 mi^{2})

Geography
- Location within Algeria
- Location: Laghouat Province, Algeria
- Parent range: Saharan Atlas

Geology
- Orogeny: Alpine orogeny

The Amour Range (Arabic: جبل العمور, French: Djebel Amour) is a mountain range in Algeria, which comprises part of the Saharan Atlas of the Atlas Mountain System.

== Geography ==
The Amour Range is located in the central area of the Saharan Atlas, with the Ksour Range in the western end and the Ouled-Naïl Range in the eastern end.

The town of Aflou, one of the highest municipalities in Algeria and also one of the coldest, is located in the range at an elevation of 1,426 m. There are about 35,000 people living in the area of the Amour Range. In Taouïala (تاوياله), located 35 km to the southeast of Aflou, there is an ecotouristic village.

== Peaks ==
The mountains of the Amour Range have altitudes averaging between 1,400 and 2000 m. The highest summit of the range is Djebel Ksel, which sits at an elevation of 2,008 m.

Other notable peaks are:

- 1,721 m high Guern Arif (جبل قرن عريف)
- 1,707 m high Mount Sidi Okba (جبل سيدي عقبة)
- 1,706 m high Mount Gourou (جبل قورو)
- 1,686 m high Oum El Guedour (أم القدور)
- 1,503 m high Kef Sidi Bouzid (كاف سيدي بوزيد).

== See also ==
- List of mountains in Algeria
- List of tautological place names
