= Mécheria =

Mécheria بلدية المشرية
- Municipality
- Commune of Mécheria
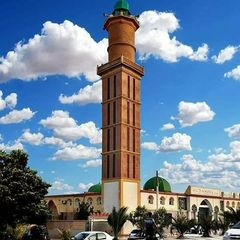

- Location of Mécheria within Naâma Province

- Location of Mécheria within Algeria
- Coordinates: 33°33′N 0°17′W
- Country: Algeria
- Province: Naâma
- District: Mécheria (seat)
- Elevation: 1,180 m (3,870 ft)

Population (Census 2020)
  - Total: 120,312
- Time zone: UTC+01 (CET)
- Postal code: 45100
- ONS code: 4502

Mécheria is a city situated in Naâma Province, Algeria in the Atlas Mountains, capital of Mécheria District, known for its cold winter and livestock life. As of 2020, it had a population of around 120,000, making it the most populous commune in the province.

It is the birthplace of the current President of Algeria, Abdelmadjid Tebboune.

== Transport ==
=== Air ===
Mécheria Airport is a military airport in Mécheria.

=== Railway ===
Mecheria is served by a narrow gauge railway from Mohammadia, however, replacing it with a standard gauge line has been proposed.

== Climate ==
In Mecheria, there is a local steppe climate. Rainfall is higher in winter than in summer. The Köppen-Geiger climate classification is BWk. The average annual temperature in Mecheria is 15.4 °C (59.7 °F). About 268 mm (10.55 in) of precipitation falls annually.

On 28 January 2005, Mécheria recorded a temperature of −13.8 °C (7.2 °F), which is the lowest temperature to have ever been recorded in Algeria.

Climate data for Mecheria (1991–2020)
Month	Jan	Feb	Mar	Apr	May	Jun	Jul	Aug	Sep	Oct	Nov	Dec	Year
Record high °C (°F)	23.5 (74.3)	28.4 (83.1)	31.3 (88.3)	34.9 (94.8)	37.8 (100.0)	41.2 (106.2)	43.5 (110.3)	42.4 (108.3)	39.4 (102.9)	34.6 (94.3)	28.2 (82.8)	26.4 (79.5)	43.5 (110.3)
Mean daily maximum °C (°F)	12.2 (54.0)	14.1 (57.4)	17.8 (64.0)	21.5 (70.7)	26.6 (79.9)	32.4 (90.3)	37.0 (98.6)	35.8 (96.4)	29.9 (85.8)	23.7 (74.7)	16.7 (62.1)	12.9 (55.2)	23.4 (74.1)
Daily mean °C (°F)	7.0 (44.6)	8.5 (47.3)	11.8 (53.2)	15.1 (59.2)	19.7 (67.5)	25.0 (77.0)	29.3 (84.7)	28.4 (83.1)	23.1 (73.6)	17.8 (64.0)	11.5 (52.7)	7.9 (46.2)	17.1 (62.8)
Mean daily minimum °C (°F)	1.8 (35.2)	3.0 (37.4)	5.8 (42.4)	8.7 (47.7)	12.9 (55.2)	17.6 (63.7)	21.6 (70.9)	20.9 (69.6)	16.4 (61.5)	11.8 (53.2)	6.2 (43.2)	2.9 (37.2)	10.8 (51.4)
Record low °C (°F)	−13.8 (7.2)	−7.0 (19.4)	−5.0 (23.0)	−1.2 (29.8)	3.1 (37.6)	6.5 (43.7)	12.0 (53.6)	12.4 (54.3)	7.5 (45.5)	1.7 (35.1)	−2.5 (27.5)	−6.2 (20.8)	−13.8 (7.2)
Average precipitation mm (inches)	16.6 (0.65)	17.5 (0.69)	26.6 (1.05)	24.7 (0.97)	17.5 (0.69)	8.4 (0.33)	5.6 (0.22)	13.4 (0.53)	26.4 (1.04)	33.1 (1.30)	27.8 (1.09)	16.2 (0.64)	233.8 (9.20)
Average precipitation days (≥ 1.0 mm)	4.0	3.6	3.9	4.1	3.0	1.6	1.7	2.5	3.9	3.6	3.6	3.8	39.3
Source: NOAA

== See also ==
- Railway stations in Algeria
