= Edough Massif =

Mountain range in Algeria

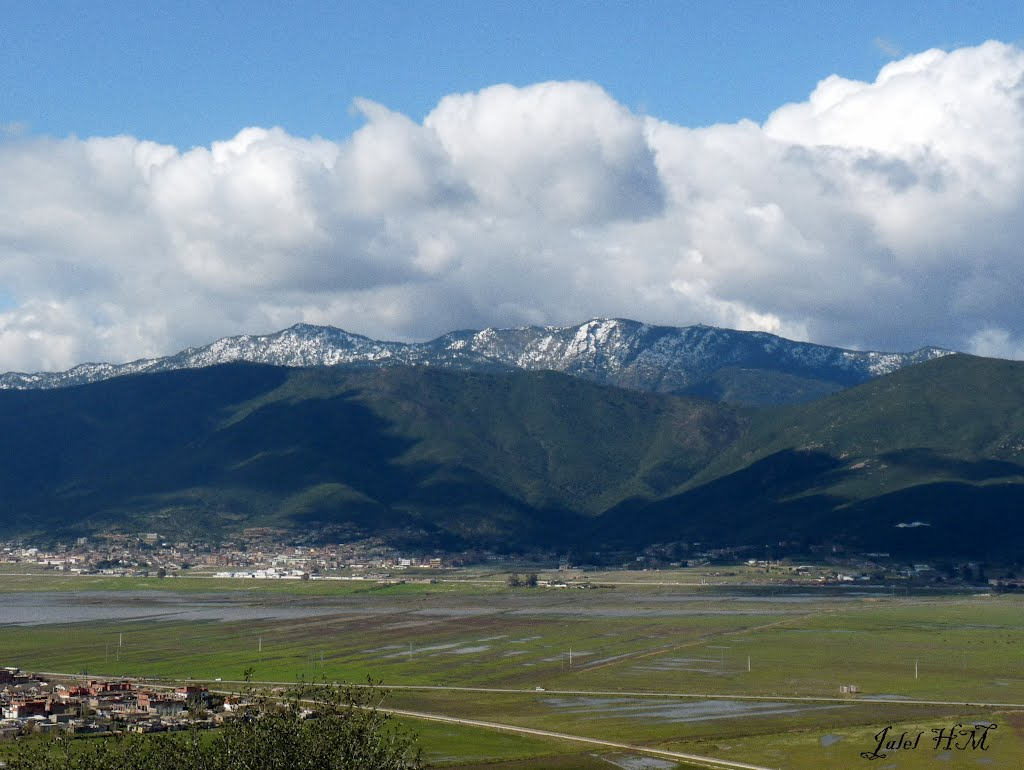
- View of the Edough Massif with snow

Highest point
- Peak: Bou Zizi
- Elevation: 1,008 m (3,307 ft)
- Listing: Mountains of Algeria
- Coordinates: 36°52′0″N 7°39′0″E

Naming
- Native name: ⴰⴷⵔⴰⵔ ⵏ ⴷⴷⵓⵖ (Berber languages); جبل إيدوغ (Arabic)

Geography
- Location within Algeria
- Country: Algeria
- Provinces: Annaba and Skikda
- Parent range: Tell Atlas

Geology
- Orogeny: Alpine orogeny
- Rock age: Miocene
- Rock type: Crystalline metamorphic

Tamazight
- Tifinagh: ⴰⴷⵔⴰⵔ ⵏ ⴷⴷⵓⵖ
- Latin: Adrar n Dduɣ

The Edough Massif, Edough Mountains, Djebel Edough (Arabic: جبل إيدوغ, romanized: Ǧabal Īdūḡ) or Adrar n Ddugh (Berber languages: ⴰⴷⵔⴰⵔ ⵏ ⴷⴷⵓⵖ). is a mountain range of the Maghreb area in Northern Africa.

== Geography ==
These mountains are a segment of the Tell Atlas alpine chain of eastern Algeria that is part of the wider Atlas Range. The Edough Massif stretches between the Cap de Garde and the Cap de Fer.

The highest point of the massif is the Bou Zizi (1008 m), located between Annaba and El Marsa.

Geologically, these mountains are a Miocene crystalline metamorphic core complex.

== Ecology ==
The Edough Massif has a Mediterranean forest cover where the cork oak (Quercus suber), a hardy Mediterranean tree, predominates. Snow is not rare in the winter and the mountains are often covered with fog, which allows ferns to grow among the undergrowth.

The forest of the Edough Massif is very vulnerable to wildfires. Vast surfaces have been burned in the last decades.

The Edough Massif was the last home of the lion (Panthera leo) in North Africa. The last lion of Algeria was killed in the Edough Massif in 1890. The massif is also the natural habitat of the Edough ribbed newt (Pleurodeles poireti), an endangered species. The vulnerable North African Fire Salamander (Salamandra algira) is also found in the range. Edoughnura, a genus of springtails belonging to the Neanuridae subfamily, is named after this range.

== Features ==
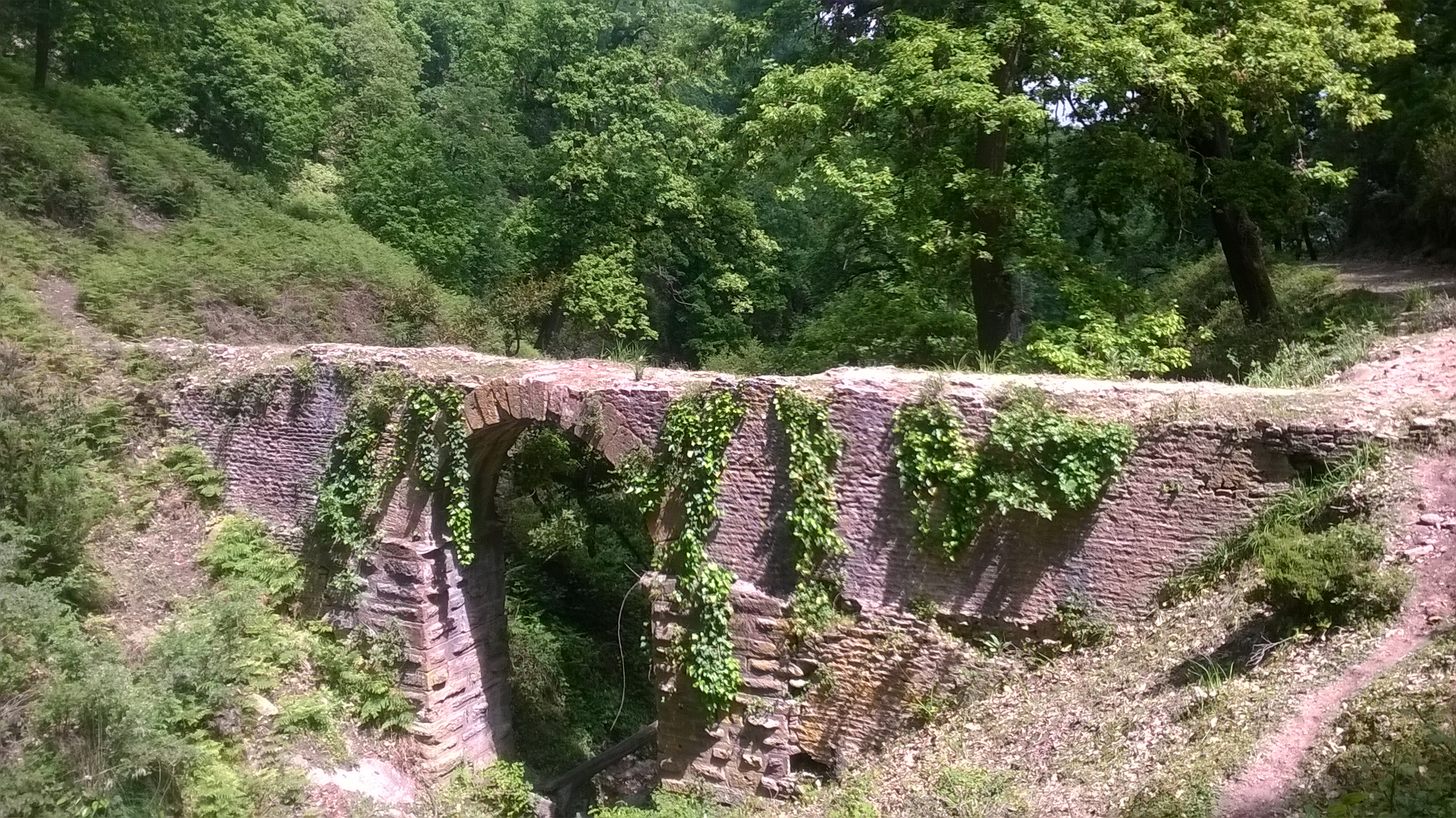
Roman aqueduct in the Edough Massif.

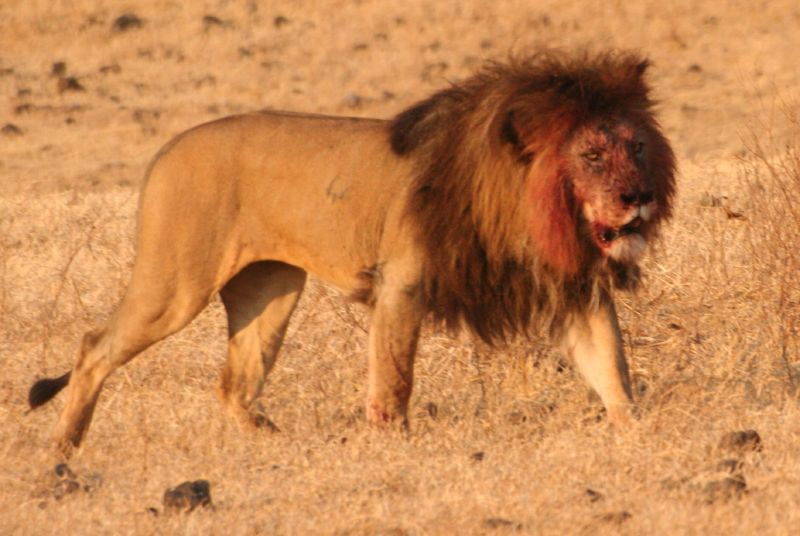
The Edough Massif was the place where the last lion of Algeria was killed.

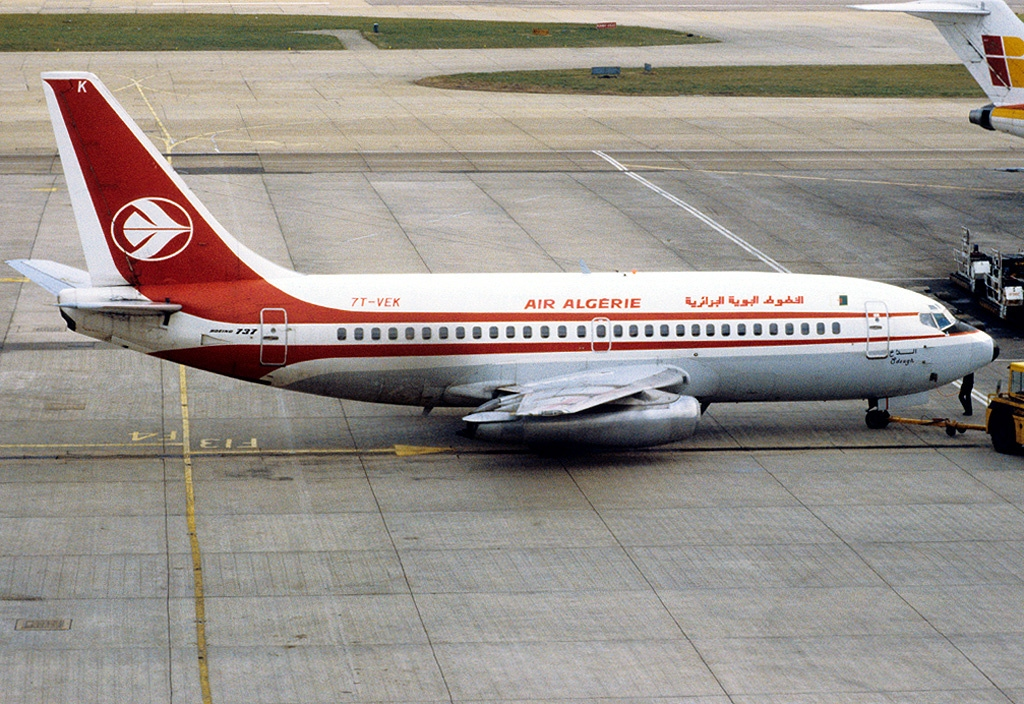
The Air Algerie Boeing 737-2D6/Adv named "Edough"
