= Teffedest Mountains =

Algerian mountain range

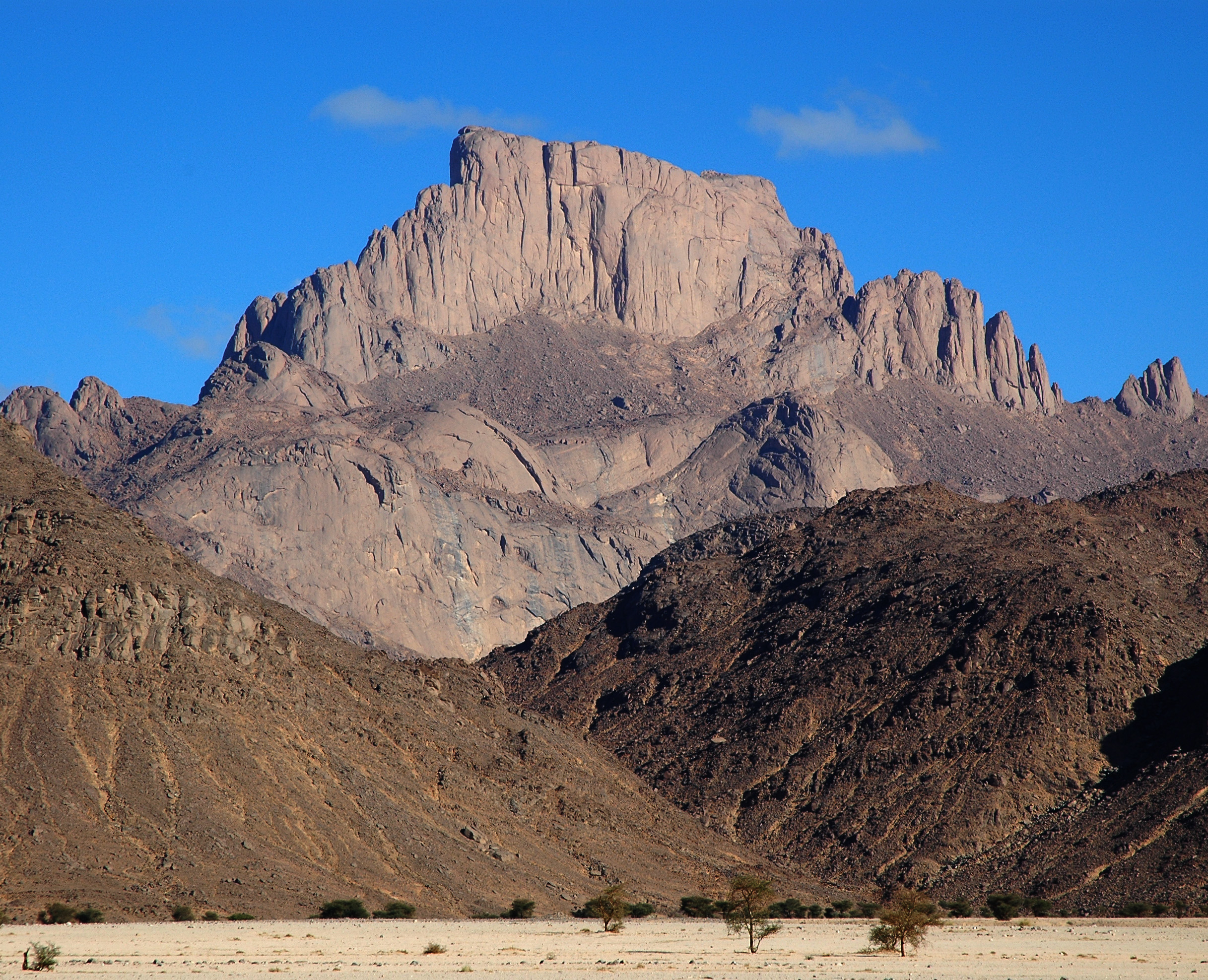
- View of 2,330 m high mount Garet el Djenoun, Teffedest, Algeria

Highest point
- Peak: In Akoulmou
- Elevation: 2,370 m (7,780 ft)
- Coordinates: 25°5′0″N 5°25′0″E

Dimensions
- Length: 120 km (75 mi) N/S
- Width: 40 km (25 mi) E/W

Geography
- Location within Algeria
- Country: Algeria
- Region: Tamanrasset
- Parent range: Hoggar Mountains

The Teffedest Mountains are a mountain range in southern Algeria. They are part of the Hoggar Mountains (Ahaggar Mountains), located in the Sahara.

== Geography ==
The Teffedest Range is about 120 km long in a north-south direction. Unlike the rest of the Hoggar Mountains, which are composed mainly of dark volcanic rock, the Teffedest is composed of pale granite. There are ancient cave paintings on some rock walls of the range. Dunes are rare in the area of this range.

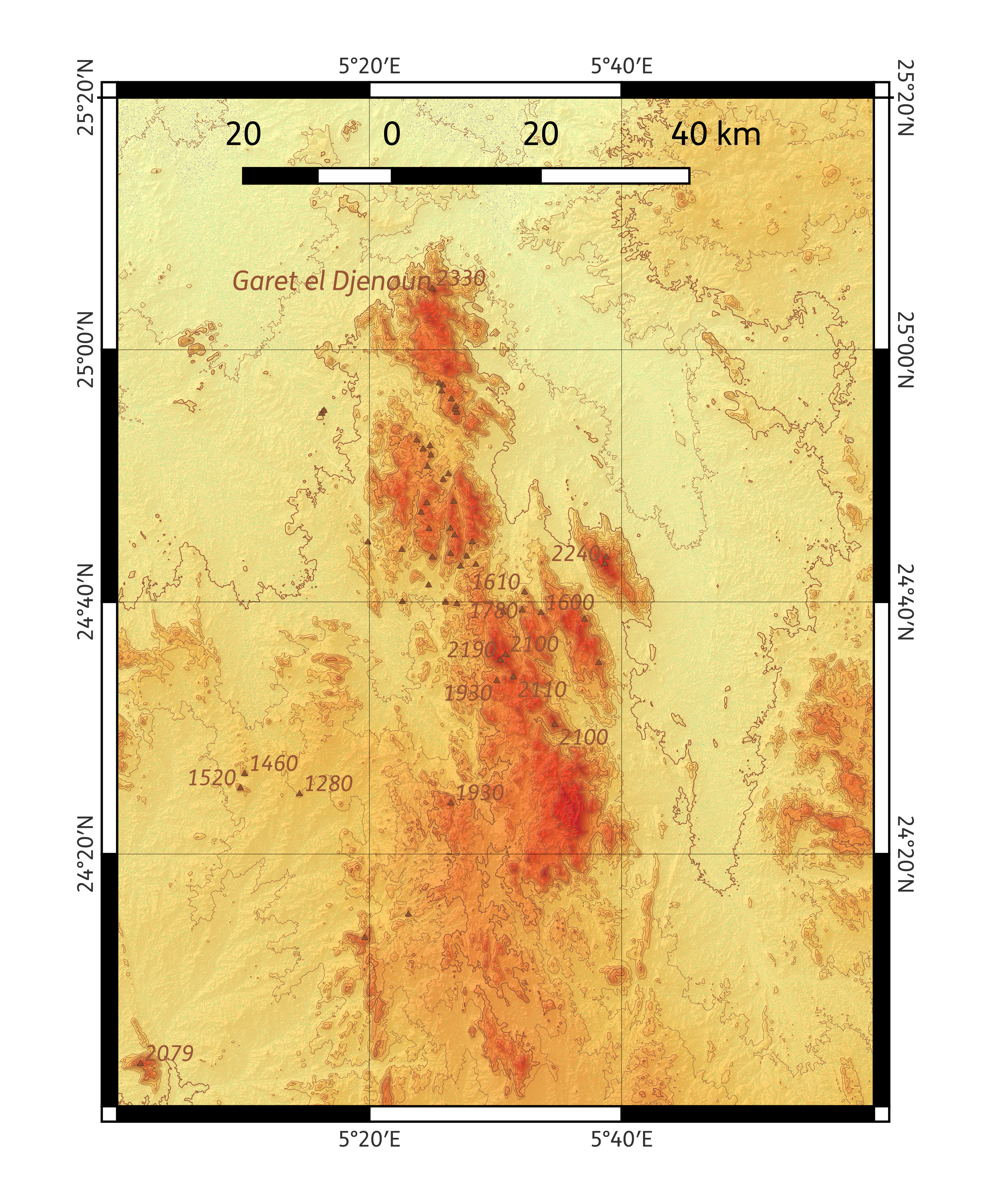
Topographic map of the Teffedest mountains

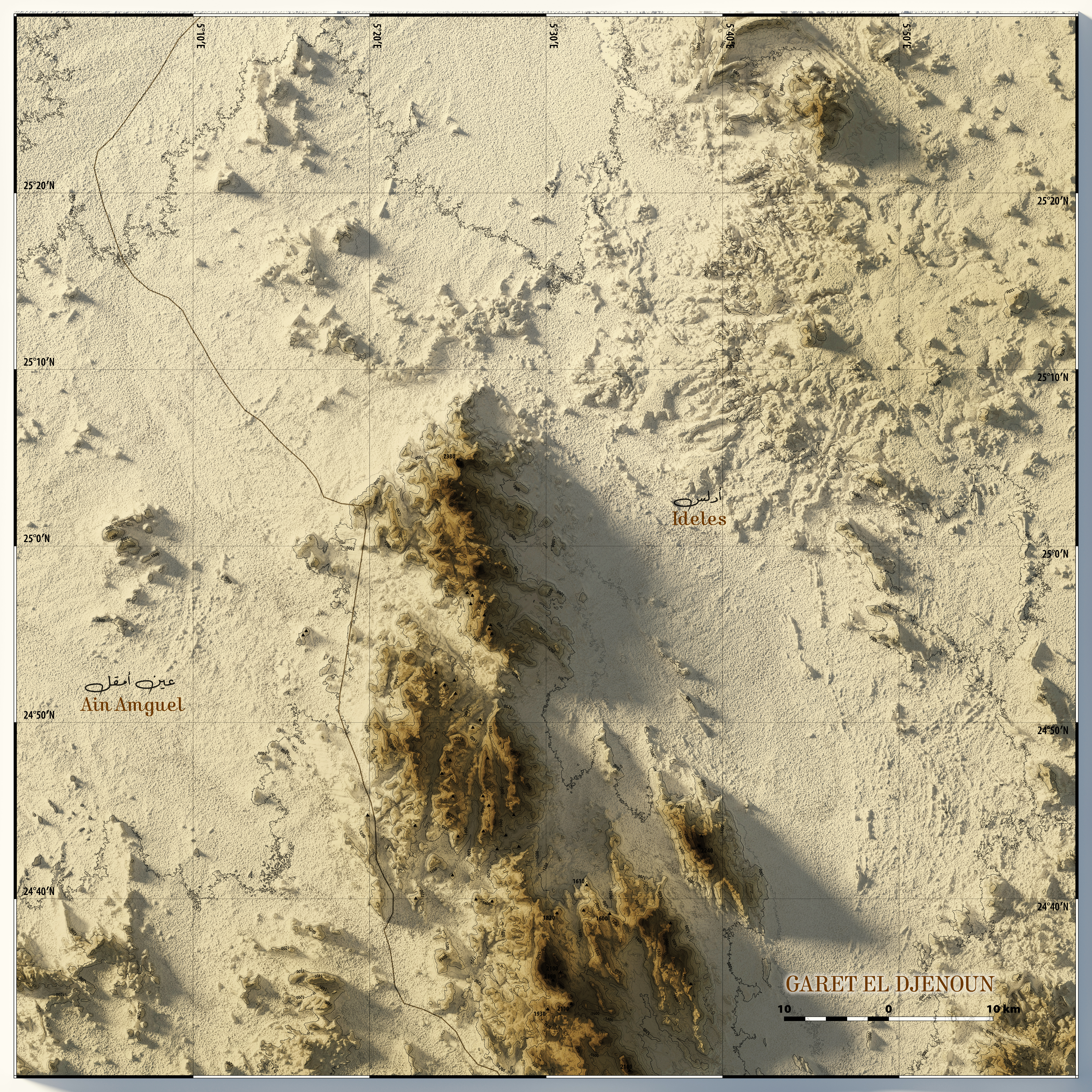
Topographic map of the Garet el Djenoun

The highest point of the Teffedest is the In Akoulmou. The impressive Garet el Djenoun, located at the northern end of the range, is one of the most conspicuous peaks of the range.

== Ecology ==
The Teffedest Mountains have been habitat to the last relict population of painted hunting dog (Lycaon pictus) within Algeria, although the species is now deemed by some to be extirpated from Algeria, due to habitat destruction by humans and by ongoing desertification.
