= Naâma Province =

Province of Algeria

Naâma Province ولاية النعامة
- Province
- Map of Algeria highlighting Naâma
- Coordinates: 33°16′N 0°19′W
- Country: Algeria
- Capital: Naâma

Government
  - Wāli: Mr. Lounes Bouzegza

Area
  - Total: 29,950 km^{2} (11,560 sq mi)

Population (2008)
  - Total: 209,470
  - Density: 6.994/km^{2} (18.11/sq mi)
- Time zone: UTC+01 (CET)
- Area Code: +213 (0) 49
- ISO 3166 code: DZ-45
- Districts: 7
- Municipalities: 12

Naâma Province (Arabic: ولاية النعامة) is a province (wilaya) of Algeria named after its provincial seat, the town of Naâma. The region is dominated by a large sabkha. There is an airport in Mécheria.

== History ==
The province was created from Saïda Province in 1984.

== Administrative divisions ==
The province is divided into 7 districts (daïras), which are further divided into 12 communes or municipalities.

=== Districts ===
1. Naâma • 2. Aïn Séfra • 3. Asla • 4. Mekmen Ben Amar • 5. Mécheria • 6. Moghrar • 7. Sfissifa

=== Communes ===

1. Naâma
2. Mécheria
3. Aïn Séfra
4. Tiout
5. Sfissifa
6. Moghrar
7. Asla
8. Djéniane Bourzeg
9. Aïn Ben Khelil
10. Mekmen Ben Amar
11. Kasdir
12. El Biod
