= Saharan Atlas =

Mountain range in Algeria and Tunisia

- الأطلس الصحراوي
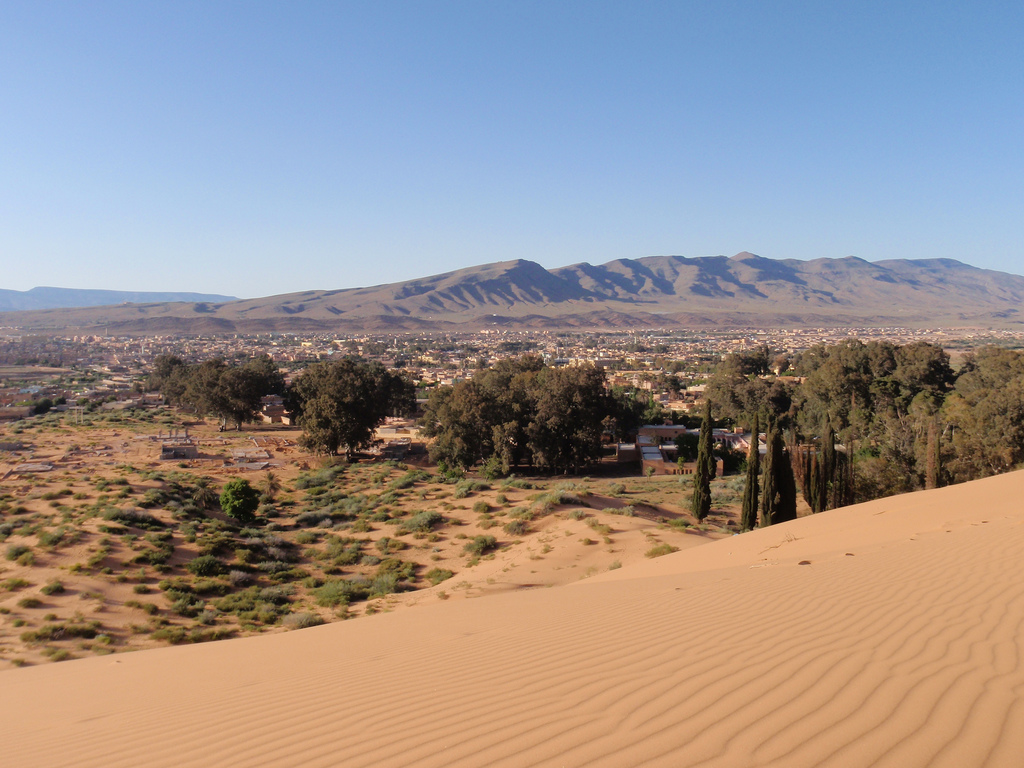
- Aïn Séfra

Highest point
- Peak: Mount Issa
- Elevation: 2,236 m (7,336 ft)
- Listing: Mountains of Algeria
- Coordinates: 34°0′0″N 2°0′0″E

Geography
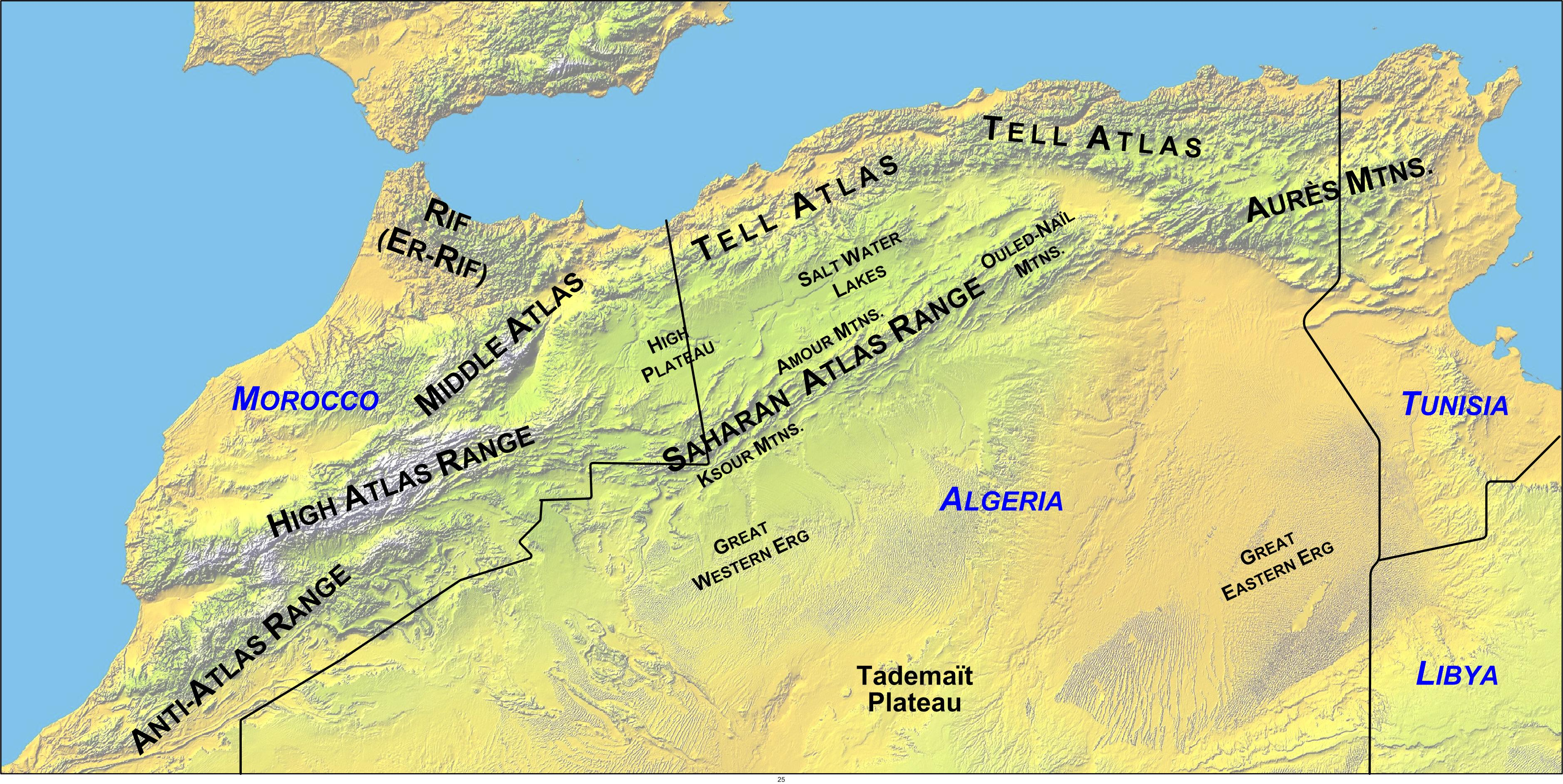
- Map of the Atlas Mountains and subranges
- Countries: Morocco, Algeria and Tunisia
- Parent range: Atlas Mountains

Geology
- Orogeny: Alpine
- Rock age(s): Cretacean, Jurassic
- Rock type: Crystalline metamorphic

The Saharan Atlas (Arabic: الأطلس الصحراوي) is a sub-range of the Atlas Mountains, located primarily in Algeria with its eastern end in Tunisia. Although not as tall as the High Atlas of Morocco its summits are more imposing than the Tell Atlas range that runs parallel and closer to the coast. The tallest peak in the range is the 2,236 m (7,336 ft) high Mount Issa in the Ksour Range.

== Geography ==
The Saharan Atlas includes a series of subranges: the Ksour Range in the west, the Amour Range in its central and the Ouled-Naïl Range at its eastern end. It also includes the Aurès (Belezma), the Hodna Mountains, the Nememcha Range and the Zab Mountains. The Tell Atlas and the Saharan Atlas merge in the east to join together into the Tébessa Range and the Medjerda Mountains.

Bordered in the north by the Hautes Plaines, the Saharan Atlas is one of the vast plateaux of Africa, formed of ancient base rock covered by the sediment of shallow seas and alluvial deposits.

Among the rivers of the Atlas, the Saharan Atlas feeds wadis. Among these are the Chelif and Touil wadis, riverbeds that contains water only during wet periods, respectively draining the Amour and Ouled-Naïl ranges of the Saharan Atlas.

The Saharan Atlas Mountains mark the northern edge of the Sahara Desert. The mountains see some rainfall and are better suited to agriculture than the plateau region to the north. Today most of the population of the region are Chaoui Berbers. The mountains have also long been home to exiles expelled from the fertile coastal regions.

== See also ==
- Mediterranean dry woodlands and steppe
