= Valva (mountain) =

Mountain in Algeria

Valva (Greek: Οὐάλουα, Ptol. iv. 2. § 16) was an ancient mountain located in the province of Mauretania Caesariensis, in present-day Algeria.
