= Naâma =

Naâma النعامة
- City
- city of Naâma
- Location of the city of Naâma within Naâma Province

- Location of Naâma within Algeria
- Coordinates: 33°15′44″N 0°18′52″W
- Country: Algeria
- Province: Naâma
- District: Naâma District

Government
  - PMA Seats: 7
- Elevation: 1,176 m (3,858 ft)

Population (2008)
  - Total: 14,624
- Time zone: UTC+01 (CET)
- Postal code: 45000
- Area Code: +213 (0) 49
- ONS code: 4501

Naâma (Arabic: النعامة or نعامة) is a municipality in Naâma Province, Algeria, of which it is the province seat. It is coextensive with the district of Naâma and has a population of 8,256, (in 1998) which gives it 7 seats in the PMA. Its population is 16,251 as per the census of 2008.

Its postal code is 45000 and its municipal code is 4501. Its telephone code is 049 nationally, or +213 49 internationally.

== Climate ==
Naâma features a cold desert climate (Köppen climate classification: BWk), bordering on a cold semi-arid climate (Köppen climate classification: BSk).

Climate data for Naâma (1991–2020 normals)
Month	Jan	Feb	Mar	Apr	May	Jun	Jul	Aug	Sep	Oct	Nov	Dec	Year
Record high °C (°F)	23.7 (74.7)	27.6 (81.7)	31.1 (88.0)	33.0 (91.4)	37.8 (100.0)	40.0 (104.0)	41.5 (106.7)	41.2 (106.2)	38.0 (100.4)	34.0 (93.2)	27.6 (81.7)	27.2 (81.0)	41.5 (106.7)
Mean daily maximum °C (°F)	12.2 (54.0)	14.1 (57.4)	17.7 (63.9)	21.6 (70.9)	26.7 (80.1)	32.5 (90.5)	36.9 (98.4)	35.6 (96.1)	29.9 (85.8)	23.7 (74.7)	16.6 (61.9)	12.9 (55.2)	23.4 (74.1)
Daily mean °C (°F)	6.1 (43.0)	7.7 (45.9)	11.1 (52.0)	14.7 (58.5)	19.5 (67.1)	24.8 (76.6)	28.9 (84.0)	27.9 (82.2)	22.8 (73.0)	17.2 (63.0)	10.7 (51.3)	7.2 (45.0)	16.6 (61.9)
Mean daily minimum °C (°F)	0.1 (32.2)	1.3 (34.3)	4.5 (40.1)	7.8 (46.0)	12.2 (54.0)	17.0 (62.6)	20.8 (69.4)	20.1 (68.2)	15.7 (60.3)	10.7 (51.3)	4.8 (40.6)	1.5 (34.7)	9.7 (49.5)
Record low °C (°F)	−12.9 (8.8)	−8.6 (16.5)	−6.3 (20.7)	−1.6 (29.1)	2.0 (35.6)	6.0 (42.8)	11.8 (53.2)	10.8 (51.4)	5.0 (41.0)	−0.7 (30.7)	−5.3 (22.5)	−8.5 (16.7)	−12.9 (8.8)
Average precipitation mm (inches)	13.7 (0.54)	14.2 (0.56)	23.8 (0.94)	21.5 (0.85)	17.1 (0.67)	12.9 (0.51)	5.5 (0.22)	18.2 (0.72)	23.0 (0.91)	28.8 (1.13)	27.3 (1.07)	13.0 (0.51)	219.0 (8.62)
Average precipitation days (≥ 1.0 mm)	3.3	3.0	3.7	3.7	3.0	2.1	1.7	3.4	3.7	3.5	3.5	2.9	37.5
Source: NOAA
