= Aïn Sefra =

Aïn Sefra عين الصفراء
- Municipality
- Aïn Sefra
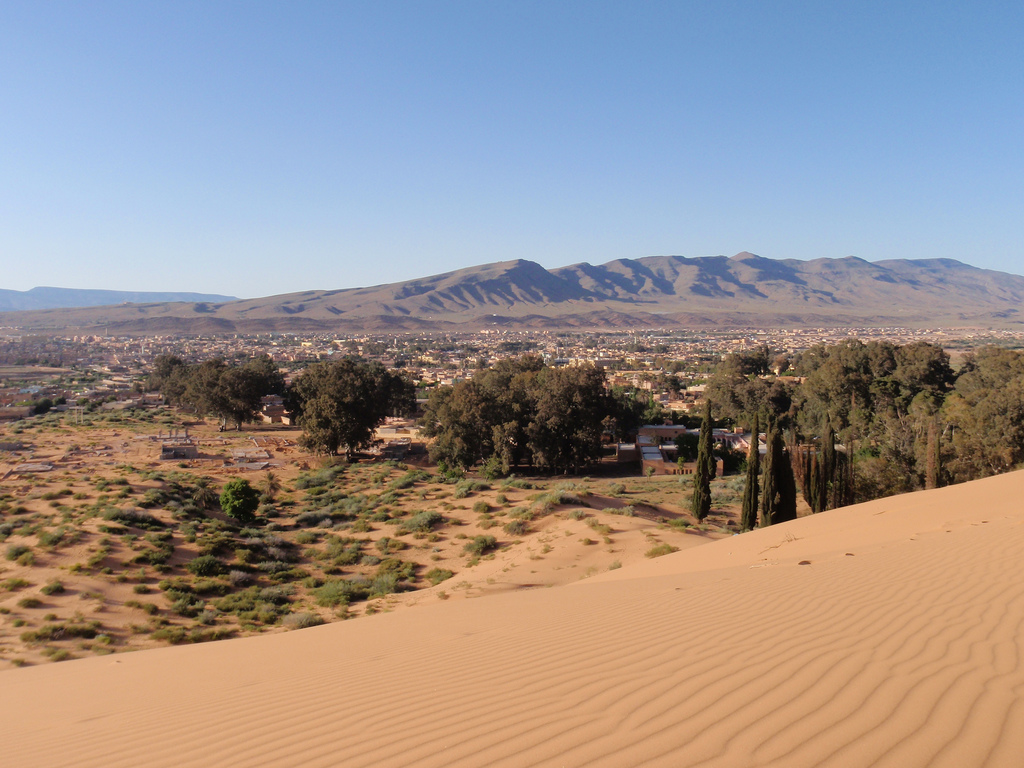

- Location of Aïn Séfra within Naâma Province

- Location of Aïn Séfra within Algeria
- Coordinates: 32°45′N 0°35′W
- Country: Algeria
- Province: Naâma
- District: Aïn Séfra (seat)

Government
  - PMA Seats: 11
- Elevation: 1,081 m (3,547 ft)

Population (2008)
  - Total: 52,320
- Time zone: UTC+01 (CET)
- Postal code: 45200
- ONS code: 4503

Aïn Sefra (Arabic: عين الصفراء, lit. yellow spring) is a municipality in Naâma Province, Algeria. It is the district seat of Aïn Séfra District and it has a population of 47,415, which gives it 11 seats in the PMA. Its postal code is 45200 and its municipal code is 4503. It is the second most populated municipality in the province after Mécheria.

== History ==
The Ksar of Aïn-Sefra was erected around the year 1586 by the children of Mohamed Benchaïb, known as Bou Dekhil, patron saint of the city, after the purchase of the land from local tribes against 1000 sheep, according to the tales of oral tradition.

=== French Period ===
During the first French incursions in the middle of the 19th century, the majority of "Chorfa" families left the ksar as refugees, mainly to Tlemcen and Fez.

The modern city dates back to the French colonial era. Initially, in 1882, a strategic military garrison post consequent to the revolt of Sheikh Bouamama left their bastion of Figuig. French troops have instead established a military post at the site of Aïn-Séfra, to control "The Gateway to the Sahara". A railway reached Aïn-Séfra as early as 1887, and it extended to Bechar and Kenadsa in 1906, both for economic and strategic reasons.

During the colonial period, it was an important sub-prefecture and a military territory, but also a region of cultural, economic and political importance. The region where Aïn-Séfra is located was one of the bastions of the popular resistance against the French colonial conquest, south of Oran.

== Geography ==
=== Climate ===
Aïn Sefra has a cold arid climate (Köppen BWk) with hot to sweltering summers and, owing to its elevation, cool to relatively cold winters, despite its location in the Sahara Desert.

Snow has been recorded on rare occasions. It lightly snowed on 18 February 1979 for the first time in recorded history, and again on 16 December 2016 and in 2017, 2018, 2021 and 2022. An unusual blizzard hit the area on 20 January 2017, dumping snow in the municipality up to a meter thick in some places. This was the largest snowfall in residents' memories and caused travel disruptions due to iced roads.

Climate data for Aïn Sefra (1991-2020, extremes for 1913-1938 and 1991-2020)
Month	Jan	Feb	Mar	Apr	May	Jun	Jul	Aug	Sep	Oct	Nov	Dec	Year
Record high °C (°F)	25.3 (77.5)	27.7 (81.9)	32.9 (91.2)	34.4 (93.9)	39.2 (102.6)	41.5 (106.7)	43.0 (109.4)	42.9 (109.2)	40.9 (105.6)	35.1 (95.2)	35.2 (95.4)	26.5 (79.7)	43.0 (109.4)
Mean daily maximum °C (°F)	14.0 (57.2)	15.8 (60.4)	19.5 (67.1)	23.5 (74.3)	28.5 (83.3)	34.1 (93.4)	38.3 (100.9)	37.0 (98.6)	31.6 (88.9)	25.6 (78.1)	18.6 (65.5)	14.8 (58.6)	25.1 (77.2)
Daily mean °C (°F)	7.4 (45.3)	9.2 (48.6)	12.8 (55.0)	16.5 (61.7)	21.2 (70.2)	26.3 (79.3)	30.2 (86.4)	29.1 (84.4)	24.2 (75.6)	18.5 (65.3)	12.1 (53.8)	8.5 (47.3)	18.0 (64.4)
Mean daily minimum °C (°F)	0.8 (33.4)	2.5 (36.5)	6.0 (42.8)	9.4 (48.9)	13.8 (56.8)	18.5 (65.3)	22.0 (71.6)	21.2 (70.2)	16.8 (62.2)	11.5 (52.7)	5.7 (42.3)	2.3 (36.1)	10.9 (51.6)
Record low °C (°F)	−8.8 (16.2)	−8.6 (16.5)	−4.6 (23.7)	−0.2 (31.6)	2.2 (36.0)	7.9 (46.2)	11.3 (52.3)	13.0 (55.4)	6.7 (44.1)	1.0 (33.8)	−5.1 (22.8)	−10.2 (13.6)	−10.2 (13.6)
Average precipitation mm (inches)	14.8 (0.58)	11.2 (0.44)	23.0 (0.91)	15.8 (0.62)	13.6 (0.54)	7.5 (0.30)	4.3 (0.17)	15.2 (0.60)	21.8 (0.86)	32.7 (1.29)	21.7 (0.85)	9.7 (0.38)	191.3 (7.54)
Average precipitation days (≥ 1.0 mm)	2.8	2.4	3.1	2.5	2.1	1.4	1.1	2.9	3.7	3.2	2.9	2.3	30.4
Average relative humidity (%) (at 7:00)	79	76	68	58	59	46	39	46	51	68	77	78	62
Mean monthly sunshine hours	223.2	240.1	279.0	282.0	328.6	354.0	362.7	344.1	309.0	254.2	195.0	201.5	3,373.4
Mean daily sunshine hours	7.2	8.5	9.0	9.4	10.6	11.8	11.7	11.1	10.3	8.2	6.5	6.5	9.2
Source 1: NOAA(extremes 1991-2020)
Source 2: Deutscher Wetterdienst (sun 1952-1957, humidity and extremes for 1913-1938)

== Demographics ==
Historical population
Year	Pop.	±%
1936	2,400	—
1954	20,100	+737.5%
1966	16,800	−16.4%
1987	23,800	+41.7%
1998	33,600	+41.2%
2008	52,320	+55.7%
Source: Populstat

== Culture ==
=== Traditional wedding custom ===
Traditionally wedding parties took place over 7 days. Nowadays, weddings last a maximum of 3 days.

For the first lunch, the relatives are invited for a meal with "merga" (dish in sauce). Subsequently, a couscous is served to the guests for the following meals.

Throughout the wedding, the bride would not leave her new home. Once the marriage ceremony was over, she would take her bucket, go out to fill it at the source and bring it home. Meanwhile, the groom would buy fruit and vegetables at the market without bags or baskets. He would then carry them in his burnous and give them to the bride, who would then give them to the cooks.

== See also ==
- Isabelle Eberhardt
