= National Office of Statistics =

Algerian statistical service

- Office National des Statistiques الديوان الوطني للإحصائيات
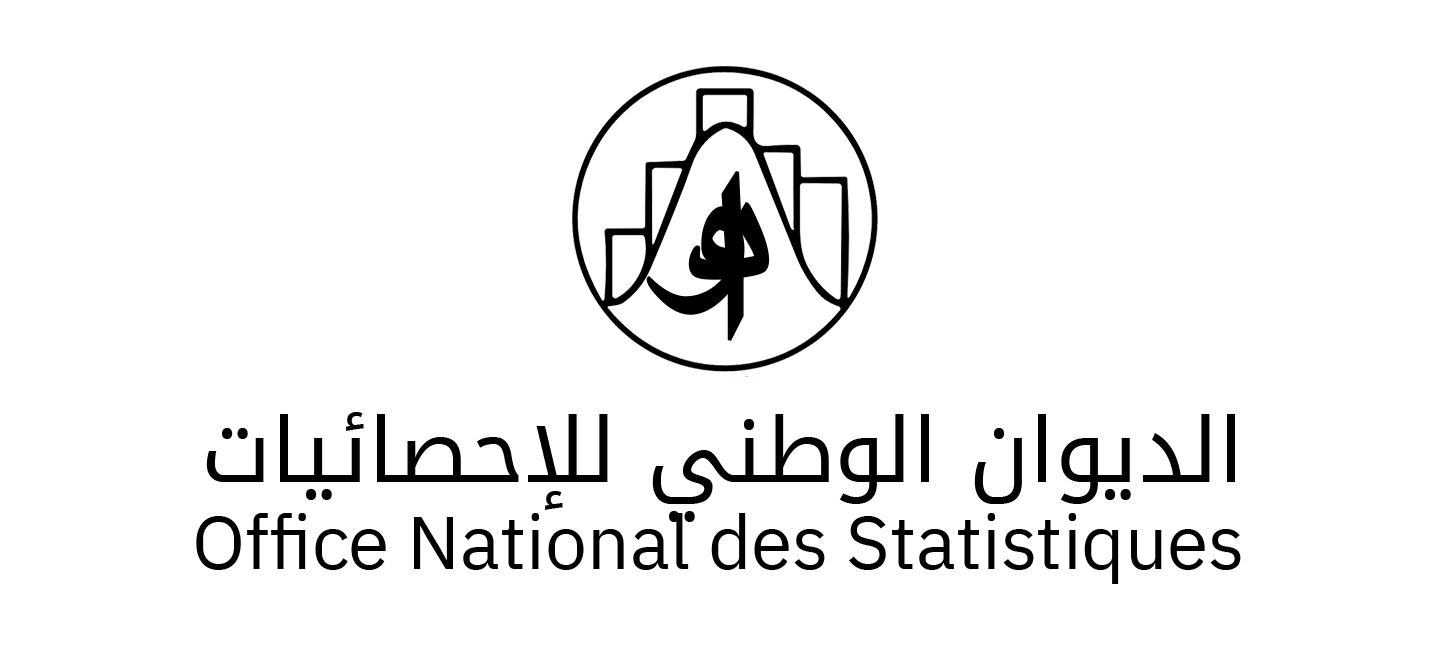

Agency overview
- Formed: 1964
- Preceding agency: INSEE (French Algeria)
- Jurisdiction: Government of Algeria
- Headquarters: Rue Mohamed Belkacem, Oued Kniss, Ruisseau, Algiers, Algeria
- Employees: 82
- Minister responsible: Bouzerd, Minister of Finance
- Agency executive: Taoufik Hadj-Messaoud, Managing Director
- Parent agency: Ministry of Finance (Algeria)
- Child agency: Regional offices in Algiers, Constantine, Oran, and Ouargla
- Website: http://www.ons.dz

The National Office of Statistics (NOS, French: Office National des Statistiques, ONS, Arabic: الديوان الوطني للإحصائيات) is the Algerian ministry charged with the collection and publication of statistics related to the economy, population, and society of Algeria at national and local levels. Its head office is in Algiers.

== History ==
It was established after the independence of Algeria in 1964, and originally named National Commission for the Census of the Population (CNRP, French: Commissariat national pour le recensement de la population).

In 1966, the office carried out the first census of the Algerian population after the independence of the country. Its missions, as well as its name, have evolved in parallel with the demographic, economic and social evolution of Algeria for which the office collects, processes and publishes statistics in these fields.
