= El Bayadh Province =

Province of Algeria

El Bayadh Province ولاية البيض
- Province
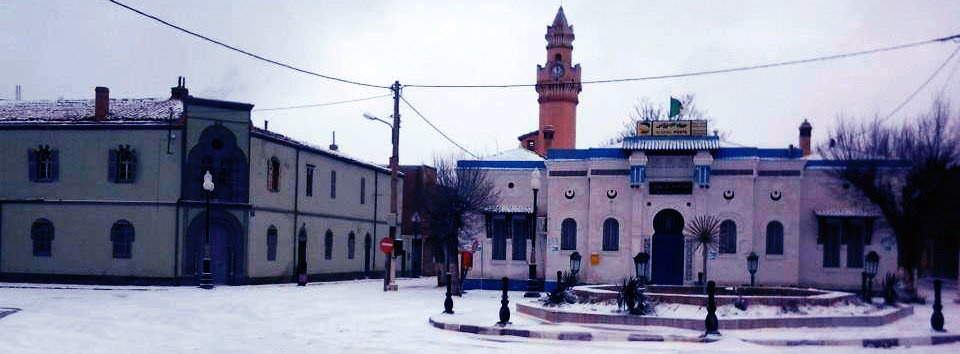
- In the center of El Bayadh

- Map of Algeria highlighting El Bayadh
- Coordinates: 33°41′N 01°01′E
- Country: Algeria
- Capital: El Bayadh

Area
  - Total: 78,870 km^{2} (30,450 sq mi)

Population (2008)
  - Total: 262,187
  - Density: 3.324/km^{2} (8.610/sq mi)
- Time zone: UTC+01 (CET)
- Area Code: +213 (0) 49
- ISO 3166 code: DZ-32
- Districts: 8
- Municipalities: 22
- Website: http://www.wilaya-elbayadh.gov.dz/index.php

El Bayadh (Arabic: ولاية البيض) is a province (wilaya) in Algeria, named after its capital El Bayadh. It is surrounded by mountains from the South, North, and Northeast of the state.

== History ==
The province was created from Saïda Province in 1984.

== Administrative divisions ==
The province is divided into 8 districts, which are further divided into 22 communes or municipalities.

=== Districts ===
1. Boualem
2. Bougtob
3. Boussemghoun
4. Brézina
5. Chellala
6. El Abiodh Sidi Cheikh
7. El Bayadh
8. Rogassa

=== Communes ===
1. Arbaouet
2. Aïn El Orak
3. Boualem
4. Bougtob
5. Boussemghoun
6. Brézina
7. Cheguig
8. Chellala
9. El Abiodh Sidi Cheikh
10. El Bayadh
11. El Bnoud
12. El Kheiter
13. El Maharra
14. Ghassoul
15. Kef Lahmar
16. Krakda
17. Rogassa
18. Sidi Ameur
19. Sidi Slimane
20. Sidi Taifour
21. Stitten
22. Tousmouline
