= Sidi Taifour =

Sidi Taifour سيدي طيفور
- City and Common
- Sidi Taifour
- Motto: "From the people, for the people"

- Location within Algeria
- Coordinates: 33.717201°N 1.682711°E
- Country: Algeria
- Province: El Bayadh Province
- District: Boualem District

Government
  - PMA Seats: 11

Area
  - Total: 1,224.70 km^{2} (472.86 sq mi)

Population (2008)
  - Total: 5,565
  - Density: 4.544/km^{2} (11.77/sq mi)
- Time zone: UTC+01 (CET)
- Postal code: 32120

Sidi Taifour (Arabic: سيدي طيفور, is a municipality in El Bayadh Province, Algeria.
