= Rogassa =

- City
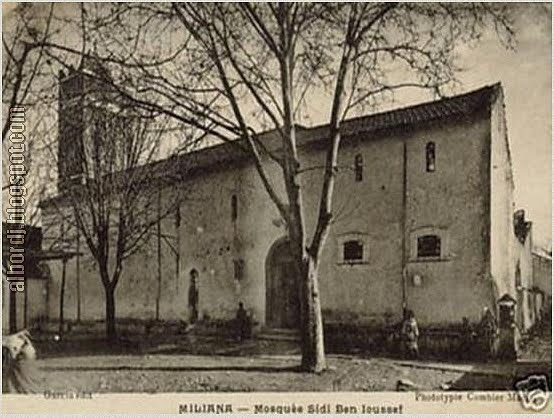

- Location within Algeria
- Coordinates: 34°01′05″N 00°55′40″E
- Country: Algeria
- Province: El Bayadh

Government
  - PMA Seats: 11

Population (2008)
  - Total: 6,288
- Time zone: UTC+01 (CET)
- Postal code: 32240
- Postal code: 3202

Rogassa is a municipality in the province of El Bayadh, Algeria. It is the district seat of the district of Rogassa.

Rogassa hosts the Zaouia El-Mouahhidine, an underground mosque, and is served by highway CW-99, which connects it to El Bayadh and Cheguig. Its postal code is 32240 and its ONS code is 3202.
