= Orani (disambiguation) =

Orani is a municipality in the Philippines.

Orani may also refer to:

- Orani, Sardinia, a municipality in Italy
- Orani, Ukraine, a village in Volodymyr-Volynskyi Raion, Volyn Oblast, Ukraine
- ORANI, an economics model by Peter Dixon

== See also ==
- Orani Church in Orani, Bataan
- Oranie, a region of western Algeria
- Orany (disambiguation)
- Arani (disambiguation)
