= Monument de la Légion Etrangère (Bonifacio) =

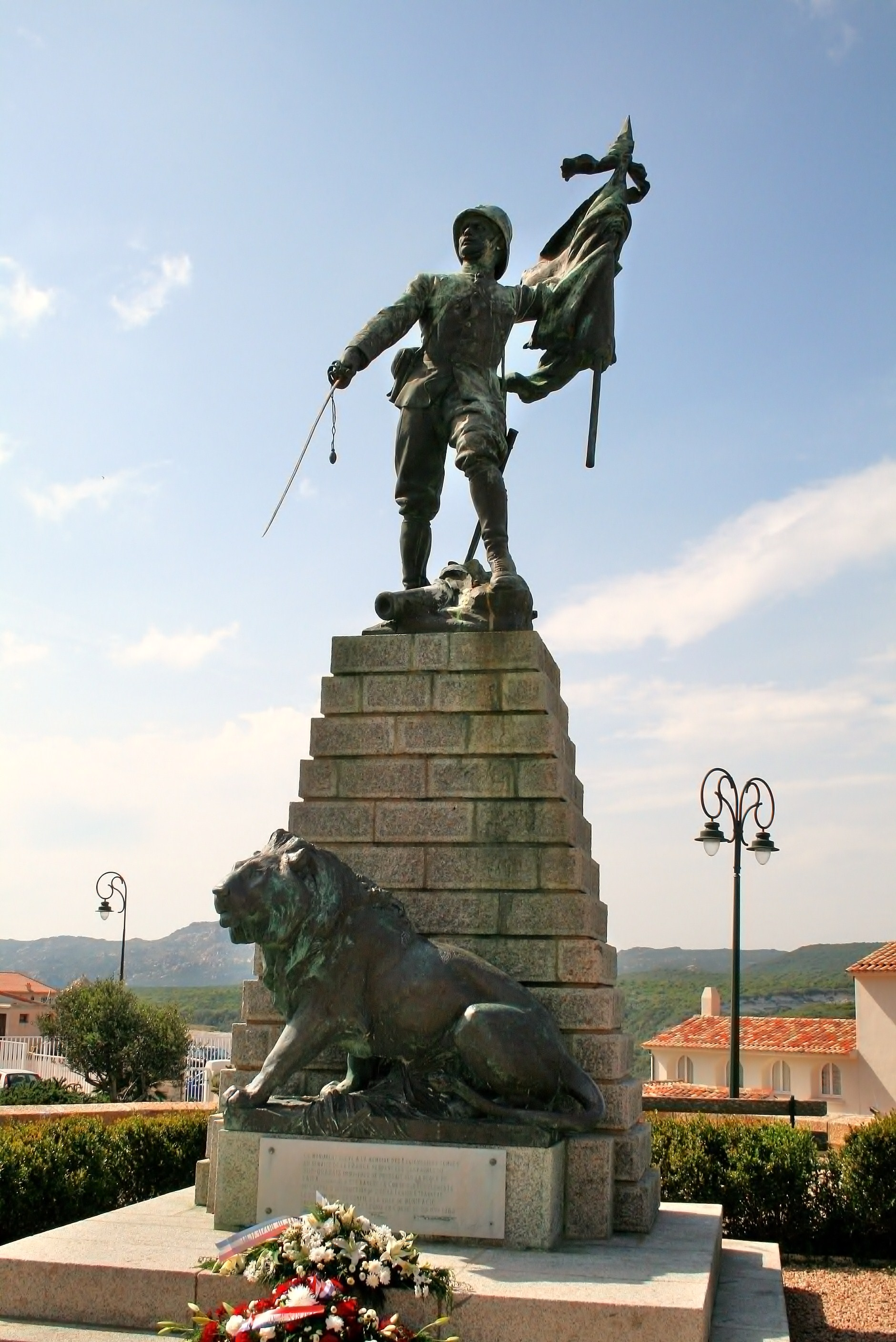
The Bonifacio Monument commemorating the soldiers of the Foreign Legion killed during the South-Oranese campaign (1897–1902)

The monument de la Légion étrangère is located in Bonifacio, a town in southern Corsica, France. It was made to commemorate soldiers of the Foreign Legion who died in the south Oranais 1872–1902. This monument was originally located in Saïda, a town in French Algeria. The monument was particularly linked to the 2nd Foreign Infantry Regiment (2e REI). When Algeria became independent, the Foreign Legion left and took the monument with them. The monument was re-erected in the Corsican town of Bonifacio.
