= Sidi Slimane =

Sidi Slimane may refer to:

- Places in Morocco:

- Sidi Slimane Province, Rabat-Salé-Kénitra
- Sidi Slimane, Morocco, a city in Sidi Slimane Province
- Sidi Slimane Air Base, an airbase near that city
- Sidi Slimane Echcharraa, a town in Berkane Province, Oriental
- Sidi Slimane Moul Al Kifane, a town in Meknès-El Menzeh Prefecture, Fès-Meknès

- Places in Algeria:

- Sidi Slimane, El Bayadh, a town in El Bayadh Province, Algeria
- Sidi Slimane, El Oued, a village in Bayadha Commune, El Oued Province, Algeria
- Sidi Slimane, Ouargla, a town in Ouargla Province
- Sidi Slimane, Tissemsilt, a town in Tissemsilt Province
