= Orany =

Orany may be:

- the Polish name of Varėna, a city in Lithuania
- Orany, Ukraine, a village in Ukraine

== See also ==
- Orani (disambiguation)
- Oranie, a region of western Algeria
