= Sidi Ameur =

Sidi Ameur is the name of:

- Sidi Ameur, El Bayadh, a town in El Bayadh Province, Algeria.
- Sidi Ameur, M'Sila, a town in M'Sila Province, Algeria.
- Sidi Ameur, Tunisia, a town in Tunisia.
- Sidi Ameur Al Hadi, a town in Morocco.
