= Tousmouline =

- city
- Location within Algeria
- Country: Algeria
- Province: El Bayadh
- District: Bougtob

Government
  - PMA Seats: 11

Population (2008)
  - Total: 3,155
- Time zone: UTC+01 (CET)

Tousmouline (Arabic: توسمولين) is a municipality of El Bayadh Province in Algeria.
