= Brézina =

- city
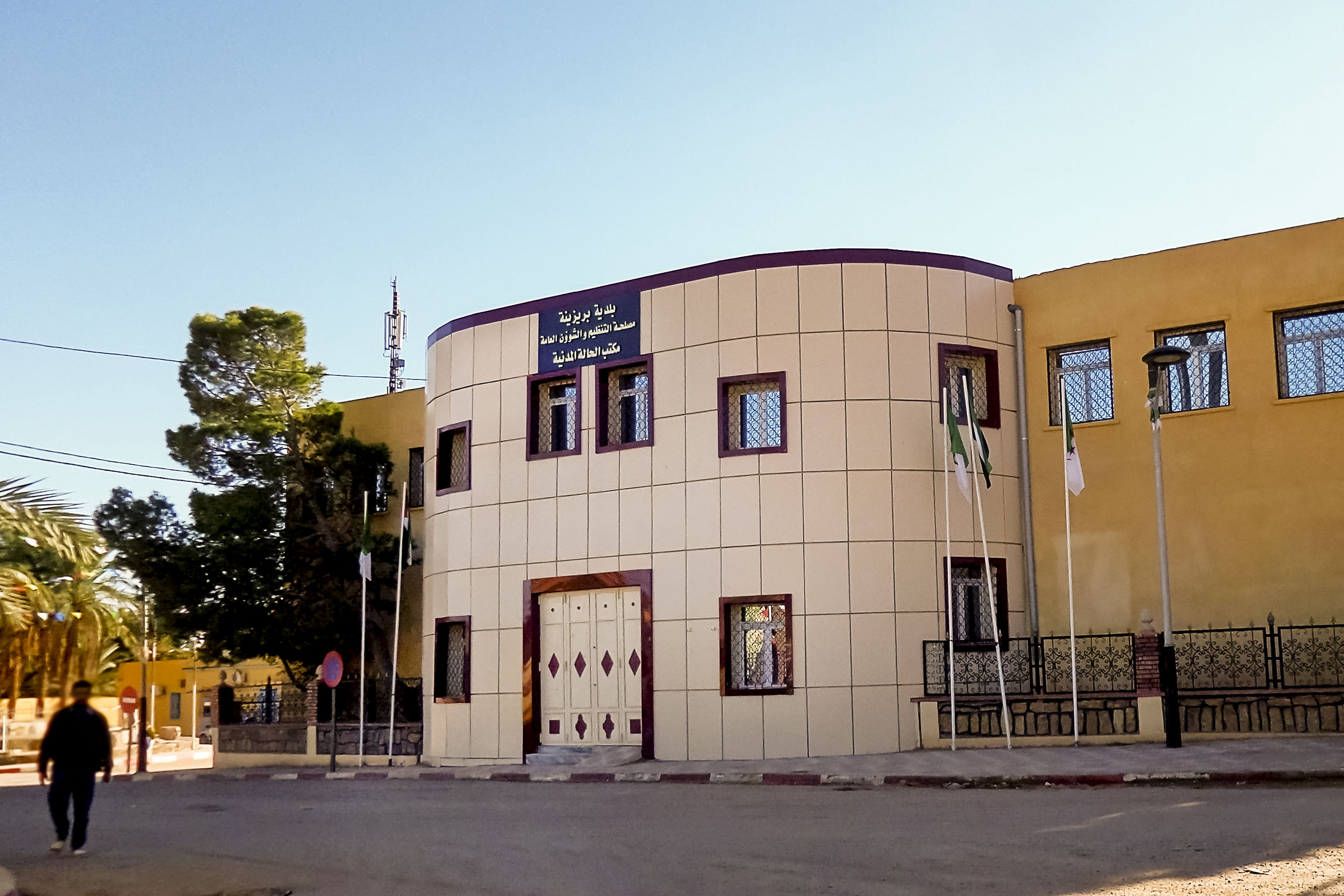

- Location within Algeria
- Country: Algeria
- Province: El Bayadh

Government
  - PMA Seats: 11
- Time zone: UTC+01 (CET)

Brézina (or Brezina, Arabic: بريزينة) is a municipality in El Bayadh Province, Algeria. It is the district seat of Brézina District and has a population of 8.536, which gives it 7 seats in the PMA. Its postal code is 32170 and its municipal code is 3204.

== History ==
During French colonial years, it was called Brézina-El-Abiod and was united with nearby El Abiod Sidi Cheikh and had the postal code 94105. After the Algerian Civil War, on February 28 an armed group massacred 20 families, shepherds and their families. On the next day, it is reported that five more people were killed than the previous estimate. As a result of the massacre, 35 terrorists were killed in El Bayadh Province and Ghardaïa Province by the Algerian Army.
