= Stitten =

- Commune and town
- Location within Algeria
- Coordinates: 33°45′29″N 1°13′24″E
- Country: Algeria
- Province: El Bayadh Province
- District: Boualem District

Population (2008)
  - Total: 6,022
- Time zone: UTC+1 (CET)

Stitten is a town and commune in El Bayadh Province, Algeria.
