= Brézina District =

Coordinates: 33.0994°N 1.2608°E

Brézina District دائرة بريزينة
- District
- Map of Algeria highlighting El Bayadh Province
- Country: Algeria
- Province: El Bayadh
- District seat: Brézina

Area
  - Total: 16,389 km^{2} (6,328 sq mi)

Population (1998)
  - Total: 15,818
  - Density: 0.96516/km^{2} (2.4998/sq mi)
- Time zone: UTC+01 (CET)
- Municipalities: 3

Brézina is a district in El Bayadh Province, Algeria. It was named after its capital, Brézina, which occupies the vast majority of the territory of this district.

== Municipalities ==
The district is further divided into 3 municipalities:

- Brézina
- Ghassoul
- Krakda
