= Ahmad al-Tijani =

Algerian Sufi leader (1735–1815)

- أحمد التجاني
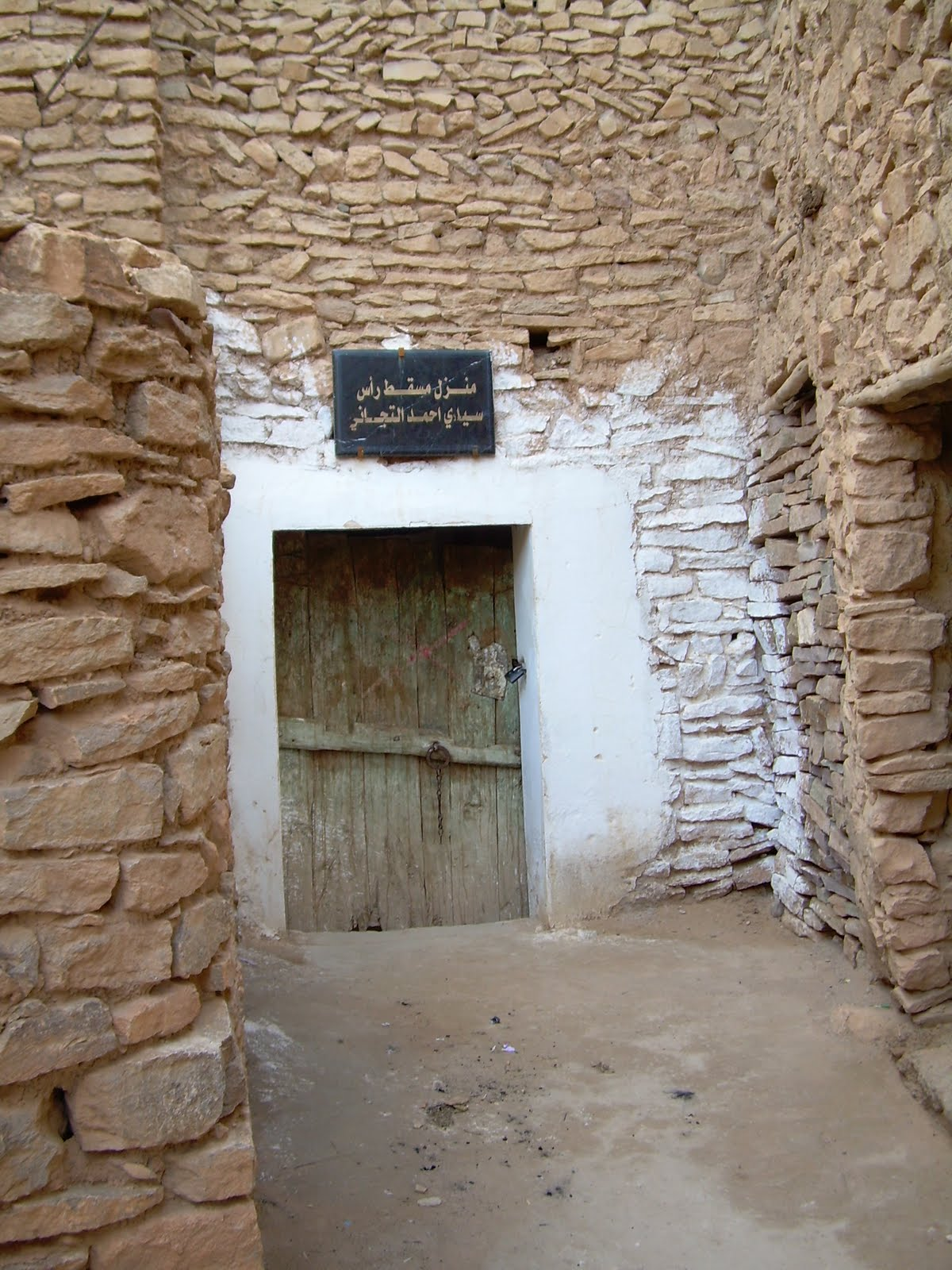
- The house where Al Tijani was born in the old Ksar of Aïn Madhi, Algeria

Personal life
- Born: 1735 Aïn Madhi, Regency of Algiers
- Died: 1815 (aged 79–80) Fez, Sultanate of Morocco
- Parents: Muhammad al-Mukhtar ibn Ahmad ibn Mahmad ibn Salim (father); Aysha (mother)

Religious life
- Religion: Islam
- Denomination: Sunni
- Jurisprudence: Maliki
- Tariqa: Tijaniyyah (founder)
- Creed: Ashari
- Arabic name
- Personal (Ism): Aḥmad
- Patronymic (Nasab): ibn Maḥmad ibn al-Mukhtār
- Toponymic (Nisba): al-Tijānī al-Ḥasanī

Al-Kutb Al-Maktum, Sayyidi Abul-Abbas Ahmed Ibn Mohammed Al Tijani

Abū al-ʻAbbās Ahmad ibn Muhammad at-Tijāniyy, commonly known as Ahmed Tijani or Aḥmad al-Tījānī (Arabic: أحمد التجاني; 1735 or 1737–1815), was an Algerian Sharif and Sufi teacher who founded the Tijaniyyah tariqa, an African Sufi order.

Born in Algeria, al-Tījānī joined several Sufi orders early in life before withdrawing for five years to a remote community. In 1781 he experienced a vision of Muhammad, from whom he believed he received the command to establish his own order. The new movement initially attracted little support, but expanded after al-Tījānī obtained royal patronage in Morocco.

After his death in 1815, the Tijaniyyah spread rapidly through North and West Africa. Sections of the order became increasingly militant toward French colonialists and non-Muslims. Its use of jihād, together with a personal cult surrounding al-Tījānī, also caused the order to be viewed with suspicion by other Muslims.

== Life ==
Ahmad al-Tijani was born in 1737–1738 in Ain Madhi. His father was Muhammad al-Mukhtar ibn Ahmad ibn Mahmad ibn Salim who according to Tijani sources was a man of learning who taught in Ain Madhi. His mother was a black woman who belonged to the original Tijanis of Ain Madhi and was called Aysha. Tijani claimed sharifian descent and traced his origin to Fatima, the daughter of Islamic prophet Muhammad. The name "Tijani" derives from a Berber tribe that lived near Tlemcen called Tijan or Tijana. Despite not coming from this tribe, al-Tijani acquired this nisba from one of his forefathers who settled in Ain Madhi and married a woman from the tribe.

When he was sixteen, Tijani lost both parents as a result of a plague. By then he was already married. He learned Quran under the tutelage of Mohammed Ba'afiyya in Aïn Madhi and also studied Khalil ibn Ishaq al-Jundi's Islamic jurisprudence works that were written under Malikite rites. He also studied Abū al-Qāsim al-Qushayrī's Risala ila al-sufiyya. In 1757, Tijani left his village for Fez. While there, he joined three Sufi brotherhoods, the Qadiriyya, the Nasiriyya, and the tariqa of Ahmad al-Habib b. Muhammed. In Fez, he met a seer who told him he would achieve spiritual revelation (fath). Thereafter, he left Fez to teach at al-Abiad, spending five years at the village. In 1772, he began a journey to Mecca for hajj and to seek a Sufi way of life. During his journey, he was initiated into the Khalwati order at Azwawi. He later taught for a year at Tunis where he achieved some success. He left Tunis for Egypt where he met Mahmud al-Kurdi of the Khalwati order in Cairo. Tijani reached Mecca in late 1773 and performed hajj rites. In his quest to seek a Sufi way of life, he met Sheikh Ahmad Abdullah El Hindi, who rarely saw people except for his servant. He also met Abd-karim al-Sammman, founder of the Sammaniyya branch of Khalwati. Al-Samman told Tijani he will become a dominant qutb (pole) or scholar within the Sufi orders in the region. Tijani left Mecca and returned to Cairo where he got al-Kurdi's blessing to preach the Khalwatiyya order. From Cairo he settled at Tlemcen for a couple of years.

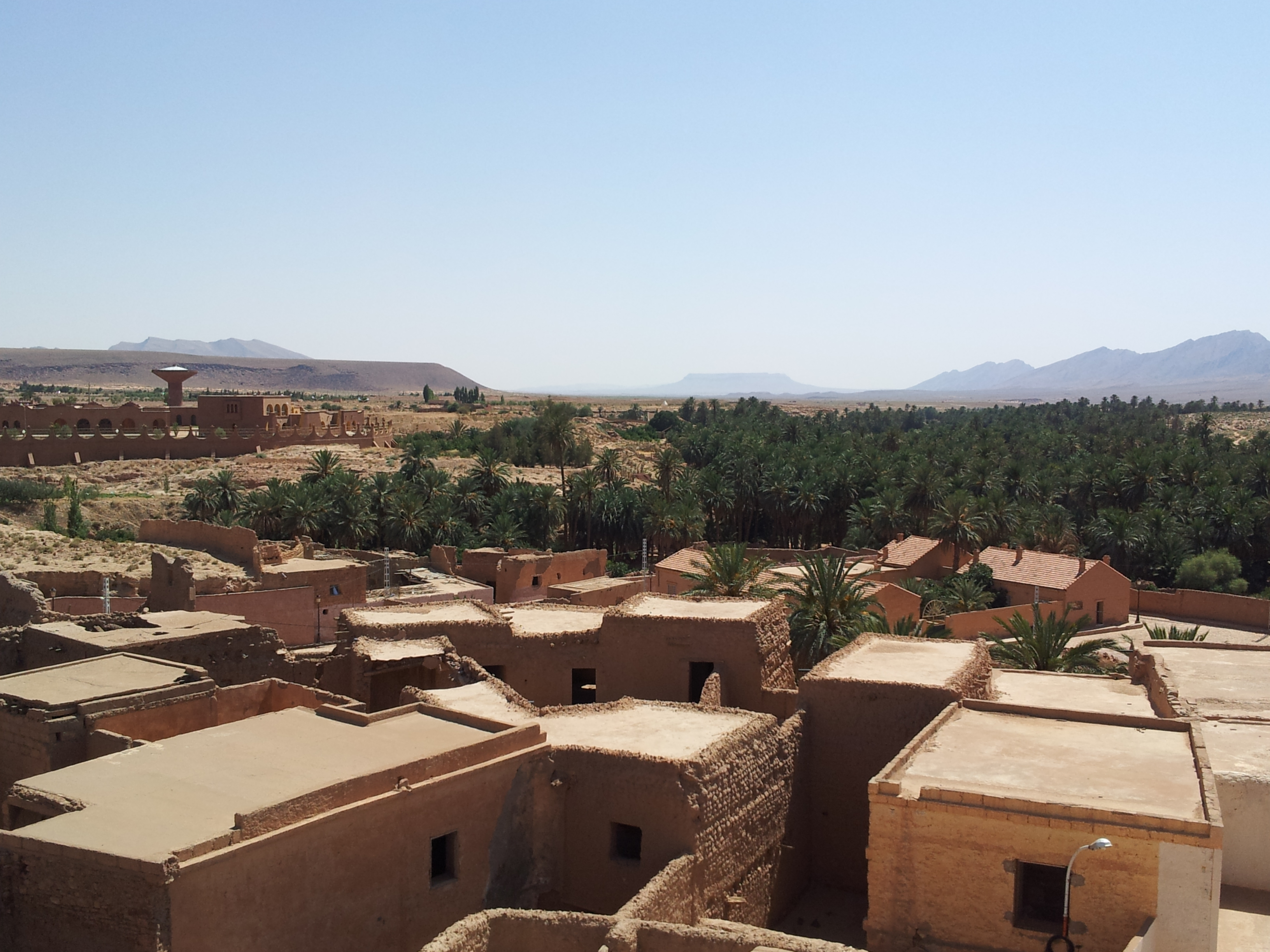
The oasis of Boussemghoun in Algeria, where al-Tijani established his tariqa in 1781

Tijani later settled at Boussemghoun, an oasis seventy five miles south of El Bayadh. It was at Samghun that Tijani received a vision from the prophet who told him to start a new Sufi order. He left his previous affiliations with other Sufi orders and claimed divine instructions from prophet Mohammed. Thus, the year 1781 marks the beginning of the Tijaniyya order. Tijani's order soon gained attraction in the desert regions surrounding Abi Samghun. Shaykh Tijani lived in Abi Samghun for about fifteen years. In 1796 he went to Fez.

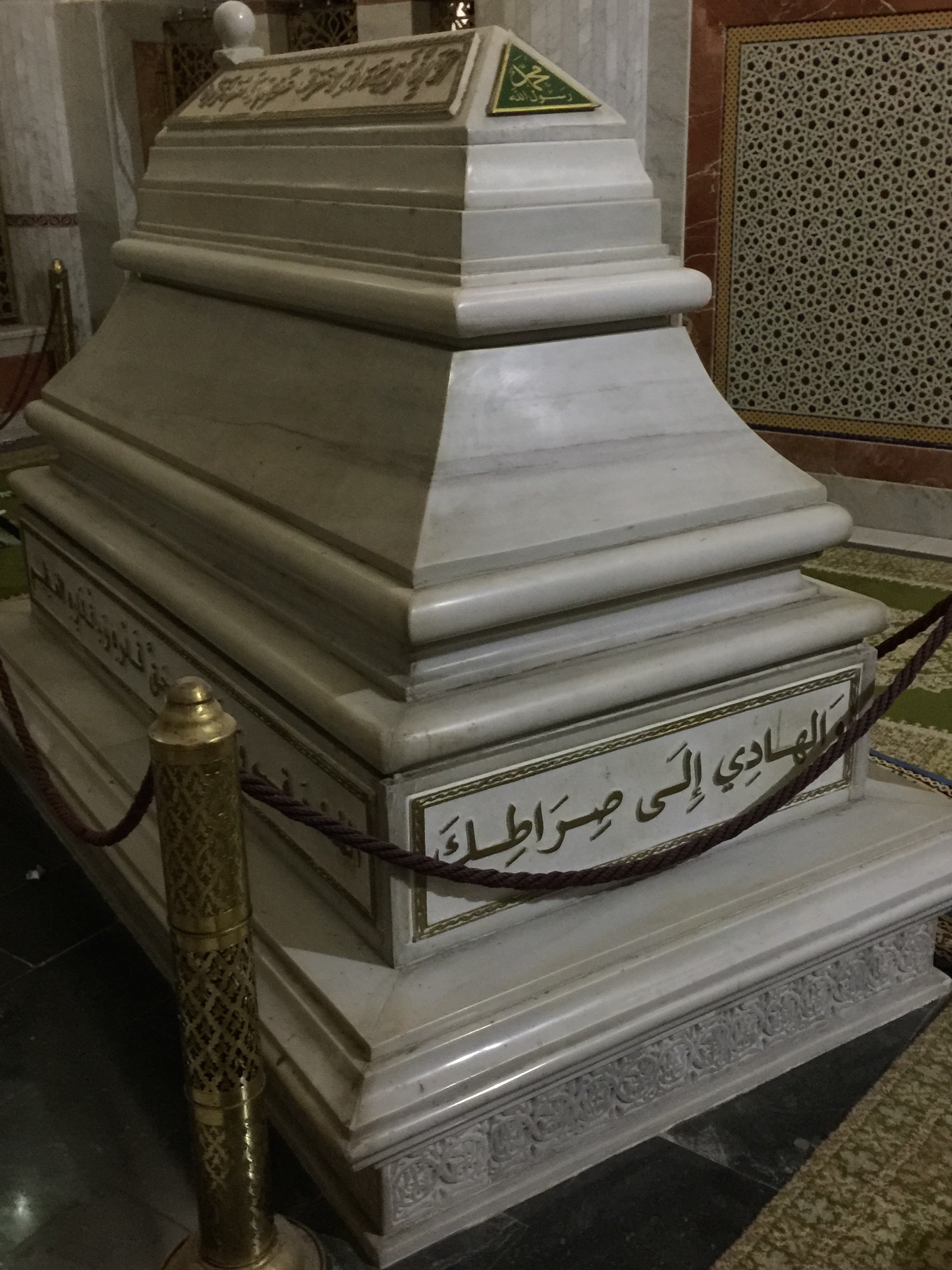
The tombstone of Ahmad al-Tijani in his Zawiya complex in Fez, Morocco

In Fez, Tijani was well received by Mawlay Sulayman, the Moroccan Sultan. Though Sulayman disliked other Sufi orders, he provided Tijani a house and appointed him as a member of his learned council. At first, Tijani chose the mosque of Mawlay Idris to pray but performed the rites of the Tijani order in his house. Tijani later built his own zawiya. In Fez, he sent his trusted aides to spread the word of his order. Trusted aides such as Abu Hafs' Abdul-Rahman was sent to Oran and Algiers and Abdul-Salam al-Waghiri to Constantine, Algeria. Further muqaddams were appointed among learned converts including Muhammad Fuwadir al-Abdallawi in the Jarid district of Tunisia and Muhammed al-Hafiz in Mauritania.

Tijani assigned to himself the title of Qutb al-Aqtab (or the Pole of the Poles) and Khatm al-Walayya al-Muhammadiyya (or the Seal of Muhammadan Sainthood).

== Seal of sainthood ==
He is quoted as saying

The bounties that flow from the Prophet (peace and blessing be upon him) are received by the natures of the prophets, and everything that flows and emerges from the natures of the Prophets is received by my own nature, and from me it is distributed to all creatures from the origin of the world until the blowing on the trumpet... No saint drinks or provides water to drink, except from our ocean, from the origin of the world until the blowing on the trumpet... 'The spirit of the Prophet and my spirit are like this' – pointing with his two fingers, the index finger and the middle finger. 'His spirit supports the Messengers and the Prophets and my spirit supports the poles, the sages, the saints, from pre-existence to eternity (mina al-azal ila abad)... These two feet of mine are upon the neck of every saint of Allah, from the time of Adam until the blowing of the trumpet... 'Our station in the Presence of Allah in the Hereafter will not be attained by any of the saints, and it will not be approached by anyone, whether his importance is great or small. Of all the saints among from the very beginning of creation until the blowing on the trumpet, there is not one who will attain to my station.

== Sources on the life of Al-Tijani ==
The greater part of the life and teaching of Shaykh Tijani can be drawn from two primary hagiographical works:

1. Kitab Jawahir al-ma'ani wa-bulugh al-amani fi fayd Sidi Abil al-Abbas at-Tijani (Gems of Indications and Attainment of Aspirations in the Overflowings of Sidi Abil Abbas Tijani) by Sidi Ali Harazem Berrada (d. 1797), and
2. Kitab al-Jami’a li-ma f-taraqa mina-l 'ulumn (The Absolute in What Has Separated from the Sciences) by Sidi Mohammed ibn al-Mishri Sibai Hassani Idrissi (d. 1809).

Later hagiographies tend to be works of compilation drawn from these two primary sources. Such hagiographies are:

1. Kitab Rima'h al-Hizb al Rahim ala Nuhur Hizb ar-Rajim (The Spears of the League of the Merciful thrown at the Necks of the League of the Accursed) by Sidi Omar ibn Said al-Futi (d. 1864),
2. Kitab Bughyat al-mustafid li-shar'h minyat al-murid (Aspiration of the Beneficiary in Commenting the 'Demise of the Disciple') by Sidi Mohammed ibn al-Arbi Sayeh (d. 1894), and last but not least,
3. Kitab Kashf al-Hijab 'amman talaaqa bi-Shaykh Tijani mina-l As'hab (Raising the Veil of the Companions who encountered with Shaykh Tijani) by Sidi Ahmed ibn al-'Iyyashi Skirej al-Fasi (d. 1940).

Most of what we know about Shaykh Tijani comes from these books.

== See also ==
- Tijaniyya
- List of Sufis
- List of Ash'aris and Maturidis
