= Kef Lahmar =

Coordinates: 33°51′00″N 0°37′57″E

- city
- Location within Algeria
- Country: Algeria
- Province: El Bayadh
- Time zone: UTC+01 (CET)

Kef Lahmar (Arabic: كاف الاحمر, lit. red foothill) is a municipality in El Bayadh Province, Algeria. It is part of the district of Rogassa and has a population of 5.245, which gives it 7 seats in the PMA. Its municipal code is 3212. There is a hot spring there.
