= François Meyer (military officer) =

French military officer (1933–2022)

- Born: 22 October 1933; France
- Died: 10 June 2022 (aged 88); Clamart, France
- Education: École spéciale militaire de Saint-Cyr
- Occupation: Military officer

François Meyer (22 October 1933 – 10 June 2022) was a French military officer who achieved the rank of brigadier general.

== Biography ==
The son of an engineer and an officer of the French Air Force, Meyer grew up in Versailles. He studied at the École spéciale militaire de Saint-Cyr and chose to enter the cavalry.

Meyer took part in the Algerian War, where he was a member of the 23rd Spahis regiment in Oranie from 1958 to 1962. He successfully led two harkis and was first commando chief of the operation sector of Géryville and Boualem. At the end of the war, which resulted in Algeria's independence, 80,000 harkis and their families were massacred by the new government. However, Meyer managed to save 350 people who settled in the Larzac and Sissonne. The harkis who settled here became farmers.

After the war, Meyer worked to maintain the memories of his fellow soldiers in combat, publishing a book in 2005. On 14 April 2012, President Nicolas Sarkozy awarded him the dignity of Grand Officer of the Legion of Honour. On 20 September 2021, President Emmanuel Macron presented him with his insignia as a holder of the Grand Cross of the Legion of Honour at a reception at the Élysée Palace.

François Meyer died in Clamart on 10 June 2022, at the age of 88.

== Decorations ==
- Grand-Cross of the National Order of the Legion of Honour (2020)
- Grand-Officer of the National Order of Merit
- Cross for Military Valour
- Knight of the Ordre des Palmes académiques
- Combatant's Cross
- Medal of the Nation's Gratitude
- North Africa Security and Order Operations Commemorative Medal

== Publication ==
- Pour l'honneur... avec les harkis : De 1958 à nos jours (2005)
