= El Bnoud =

El Bnoud البنود
- Commune and town
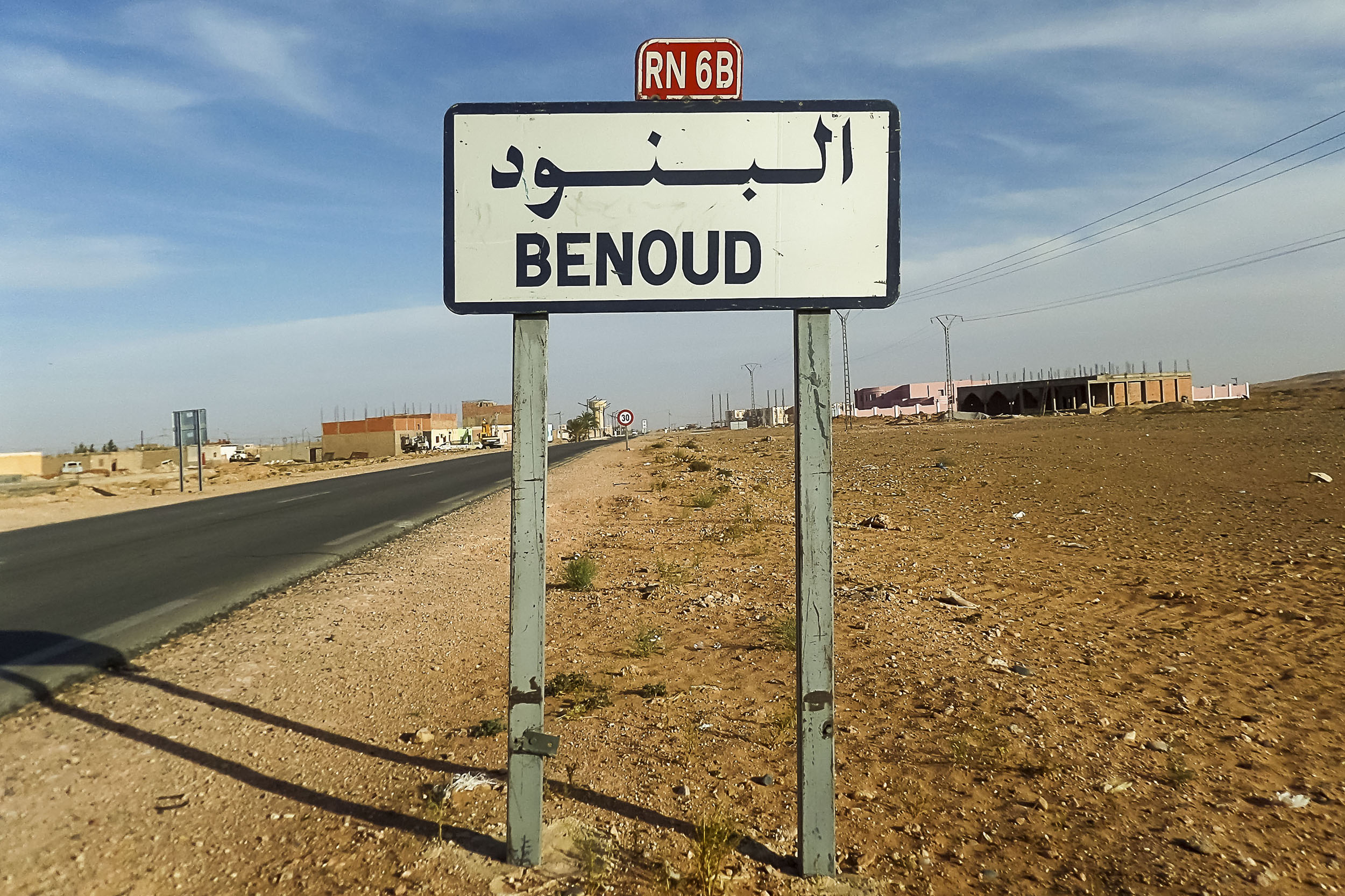
- Entrance to El Bnoud

- Location within Algeria
- Coordinates: 32°18′44″N 0°14′40″E
- Country: Algeria
- Province: El Abiodh Sidi Cheikh Province
- District: El Abiodh Sidi Cheikh District

Population (2008)
  - Total: 1,607
- Time zone: UTC+1 (CET)

El Bnoud or Benoud is a town and commune in El Abiodh Sidi Cheikh Province, Algeria, and is the southernmost commune in the province. It had a population of 1,607 in 2008.

== Geography ==
El Bnoud is located in the northern section of the Grand Erg Occidental, and the main settlement is located on the southern banks of the Oued el Rharbi river. It is located about 70km (44mi) south of the district seat of El Abiodh Sidi Cheikh, and almost 170km (100mi) from the province capital of El Bayadh.

== History ==
The municipality was created from El Abiodh Sidi Cheikh in 1985.
