= Municipal assembly =

Municipal assembly is generally synonymous with town council, a body of citizens who govern a town or municipality. It may refer to:

- Assembleia Municipal in Portugal
- Municipal assembly (Sweden)
- People's Municipal Assembly in Algeria
- Town meeting in the United States
