= François Meyer =

François Meyer may refer to:

- François Meyer (wrestler)
- François Meyer (military officer)
