= Cheguig =

Coordinates: 34°10′08″N 1°13′41″E

- city
- Location within Algeria
- Country: Algeria
- Province: El Bayadh
- Time zone: UTC+01 (CET)

Cheguig is a municipality in El Bayadh Province, Algeria. It is part of the district of Rogassa and has a population of 1693, which gives it 7 seats in the PMA. Its municipal code is 3217 and postal code is 32250.
