= Al-Hakim al-Tirmidhi =

9th-century Islamic scholar

Al-Ḥakīm al-Tirmidhī
- Title: Hakim at Tirmidhī

Personal life
- Born: 750 – 760 CE 133 AH – 143 AH
- Died: 869 CE 255 AH
- Era: Islamic golden age
- Main interest(s): Fiqh, Hadith, Sufism, Kalam
- Notable work(s): Nawadir al-Usul fi Ma'rifat Akhbar al-Rasul, Haqiyqat al-Adamiyya and al-Rad 'ala al-Mu'attila

Religious life
- Religion: Islam
- Denomination: Sunni
- Jurisprudence: Hanafi

Al-Ḥakīm al-Tirmidhī (Arabic: الحكيم الترمذي; transl. The Sage of Termez), full name Abu Abdallah Muhammad ibn Ali ibn al-Hasan ibn Bashir al-Tirmidhi (d. c. 869) was a Persian Sunni jurist (faqih) and traditionist (muhaddith) of Khorasan, but is mostly remembered as one of the great early authors of Sufism.

Information about his life and scholarly and creative activities can be found in the works by Taj ad-Din al-Subki (Tabaqat Ash-Shafiyya Al-kubra), al-Khatib al-Baghdad (Tarikh Baghdad), Ibn Hajar al-Asqalani (Lisan al-Mizan), Sulami (Tabaqat As-Sufiyya) and in a number of other treatises.

He received criticism from other traditionalists, however al-Dhahabi defended him, saying, "He is a leader in Hadith".

Al-Hakim al-Tirmidhi speaks about his life in his book Bad'u Shaani Abu Abdullah ("The Beginning of Abu Abdullah's Pursuit"), published in Beirut in 1965 by Yakh'ya Ismail Usman, together with the work of the scientist in Khatm Al-Awliya ("Seal of the Saints").

== Life ==
Tirmidhi was apparently born between 820 and 825 AD in Termez, Khorasan, nowadays Uzbekistan. His father was a scholar of hadith and a jurist; his early education appears to have been very orthodox. He was reared as a scholar of hadith and fiqh (law), more specifically, the Hanafi school of law that was dominant in eastern territories of Iran. However he also held the Hanbalis in greet esteem. The range of Tirmidhi's education did include the sciences, such as Greek natural science and philosophy. His subsequent reference to learning the use of the astrolabe, implying a knowledge of astronomy and mathematics, has been given different interpretations. "There is no trace of influence from 'natural science' in his writings." But being a Sufi Master is enough to accept that he did. His works touch on Kalam and Aqeedah, and he entered into rational disputation with the Mutakillimun of his era, and maintained a critical attitude of them. His works, containing a variety of content, cannot be considered entirely in the category of mystical works, or in the category of hadith sciences, nor in the category of philosophical works, or in the category of kalam or jurisprudence. However, his general pursuit of knowledge gained him the name of "al-hakim".

== Early years ==
Different dates are used in written sources and present literature to indicate al-Hakim al-Tirmidhi's date of birth and death. Some authors, Khwaja Khalif in particular, in his Kashf as-Zunun, give the year 255 in Hijra / 869 AD as Al-Hakim al-Tirmidhi's date of death. The same date was written on Al-Hakim al-Tirmidhi's tomb. If we proceed from the fact that Al-Hakim al-Tirmidhi lived more than one hundred years, some sources say 112, 116 or 120 years, he was born approximately between 750 and 760 AD. At the same time, Abdulfattah Abdullah Baraka who wrote his great "Al-Hakim al-Tirmidhi and Nazariyyatukhu fil" ("Al-Hakim al-Tirmidhi and his theory") thirty years ago, said that Al-Hakim al-Tirmidhi, was born in 205 in Hijri / 820 and died in 320 in Hijri / 932 and lived 112 years.

Muslim hadith scholars report that there is a difference of opinion over his birth and death, but that he died around 280 H, having lived for 70 to 80 years.

Detailed information about Al-Hakim al-Tirmidhi's childhood and youth is not available in the sources. According to his "autobiography", he started learning religious sciences when he was eight, and he made a Hajj to Mecca when he was twenty-eight.

== Later life ==
Returning from Mecca, Al-Hakim al-Tirmidhi became a Sufi follower; he withdrew from people and learned treaties. His father Ali bin Hassan was a leading scholar, a hadith specialist, who, looking for knowledge, went to Baghdad and took an active part in scientific discussions with prominent scholars of the time on various problems of hadith. His mother and uncle were considered to be experts of hadith. Consequently, Al-Hakim al-Tirmidhi grew up in the circle of educated and scientific people, which influenced greatly on his ideology.

Some written sources contain reliable information about Al-Hakim al-Tirmidhi's teachers. His teacher was his father Ali bin Al-Hassan at Tirmidhi "History of Baghdad" by Khatib Al-Bagdhadi contains some information. Among his other teachers were Kutaiba bin Sayid as-Sakafi Al-Balkhi (798–888 AD), Salih bin Abdullah al-Tirmidhi of much interesting facts had been written in the book "Books about Famous People" by Ibn Khibbana; Salih bin Muhammad al-Tirmidhi who was former qazi of Termiz for some time, Sufyan bin Vaki (died in 860), Hassan bin Umar bin Shafiq Al-Balkhi (died in 840 AD), Ahmad bin Khadravayh (died in 854 AD), Abu Turab An-Nakhshabi (link), and Yahya bin Maaz Ar-Razi (died in 875 AD).

Based on data given in the written sources Al-Hakim al-Tirmidhi's life can be divided into the following periods:

- The first period includes al-Hakim al-Tirmidhi's childhood up to seven. Unfortunately we do not have exact information about this part of his life. But nevertheless, one can say that unlike the children of his age he displayed ability at this age to various games, as if he prepared himself to the future scientific life, he worked hard with his teachers, obtained knowledge on various sciences (particularly on theology) and got ready to mystic spiritual life.
- The second period embraces Al-Hakim al-Tirmidhi's life from eight to twenty eight, when he received knowledge from different teachers (sheikhs). For knowledge he visited other oriental cities, was in Mecca and made a pilgrimage. Some sources pointed to the fact that he paid much attention to learning hadith and problems of fiqh in this period of his life.
- The third period of his life is related to learning the Qur'an thoroughly. He assimilated by deep God's words, their essence, fasting, praying and pious deeds and so on. The philosophic mystic work by Al-Antahi "Healing of Hearts" had a great influence on him.

Al-Hakim al-Tirmidhi had many of students, including: Abu Muhammad Yahya bin Mansur Al-Kadi (died in 960 AD), Abu Ali Mansur bin Abdullah bin Khalid Al-Zuhli Al Hiravi; Abu Ali Al-Hassan bin Ali Al-Jurjani. He also taught Ahmad bin Muhammad bin Isa, Abu Bakr Muhammad Ibn Umar Al-Al Hakim Al-Varrak, Muhammad bin Jaafar bin Muhammad bin Al-Haisam bin Umran bin Buraida, and others.

Al-Hakim al-Tirmidhi's scientific and creative activity is closely connected with his travels to other countries and cities. He visited Balkh, Nishapur, and Baghdad, where science and culture reached its zenith, and he met famous scholars and took part in discussions. Nevertheless, Termiz, his native city played an important role in his scientific and creative activity, and there he created his basic works. His sermons and as well as some works, first of all, Hatam Al-Avliya (Seal of Saints), Hal Ash-Shari'a (Arguments of the Islamic Law) in which are discussed Muslim rituals, about "love for God" and about various categories of mystics, about "the Seals of Saints", along with existing "Seals of Prophets", had dissatisfied some parts of the falikh and rich. Escaping from his enemies' chase, Al-Hakim al-Tirmidhi had to move to Balkh and then to Nishapur, where he was very well accepted and where he obtained a large number of followers later.

== Views ==
=== Theology ===
==== Divine Nature ====
Al-Tirmidhi spoke at length of the Muwahhidun as believers specifically in Tanzih (absolute divine transcendence) for the only God, not simply using the term Muwahhid in its conventional theological sense (i.e. as a person who simply affirms that there is numerically only a single God - which by comparison admits also corporealism). Al-Geyoushi states that this is the only belief for a Muwahhid to state when he sees 'nothing with God' and that this view is conducive to the belief in seeing God by Fana (annihilation).

Indeed, when Al-Tirmidhi was asked whether it is possible to see God, he replied simply, "Yes," However, when the man acquired further as to exactly how he can be seen, al-Tirmidhi replied, "As he is known here." To this the man replied, "And how is he known here?" Al-Tirmidhi replied, "As He will be seen there," He furthers the idea that man will see God but not fully see everything of him - commenting on the Quranic verse, "Vision comprehendeth Him not, but he comprehendeth (all) vision. He is the Subtile, the all Aware." that God is not completely visible in all of his aspects in either this world or the next, but people will be able to him some of his qualities without seeing everything of him - as indicated by the usage of the word adraka (to grasp or to see everything) in the verse.

Maintaining the idea that God had attributes (sifat), he is grouped confidently with the Sunnis, and he adopted a traditionist approach in his refutation of the Mu'tazila (al-Radd ala al-Mu'atillah). To refute the Mu'tazila, who rejected God having Sifat (attributes), he simply brought hadith which mentioned the attributes so much so that the work where he does this is classed with the works on hadith.

==== Other Theological Views ====
One of the few works which contain only his theological views is his refutation of the Shi'a (al-Radd ala al-Rafidah), where he refutes the Shi'i rejection of a right to the Caliphate by Abu Bakr and Umar. He also expounds on the concept of Caliphate (Islamic Government) itself, and who is eligible for it.

He also talked at length regarding the contention between the two groups as to whether faith (iman) once acquired can increase/decrease or not, saying that faith itself does not increase or decrease, but its effects can vary in extent and degree, giving the example of the Sun and Sunshine - we do not see the Sun's light increase or decrease but we see an increase and decrease in the Sunshine on the Earth. He thus argued that it was a matter of perspective which group was correct and that the group who said faith does increase can also be interpreted to be correct for they are referring to the effects of the faith.

Believing in the acquirement of human acts, Al-Tirmidhi also argued that belief is acquired as it is an act, but that the instrument to acquire belief (the intellect) is a granted gift from God. Al-Tirmidhi used this in his answer to the problem of Evil, saying 'good' and 'evil' are from God by his divine character, but also from man in what they acquire of their deeds. He further said that God was not answerable for his character, but that man was answerable for his deeds.

Finally he maintained the orthodox line in saying that Heaven and Hell would not end, saying the perishing suggested by the verse, "Everything shall perish except Himself" is different from extinction (permanently going away), saying that they both perish but aren't subject to extinction.

== Works ==
According to Radtke and O'Kane, "he is the first and, up until the time of Ibn al-Arabi, the only mystic author whose writings present a broad synthesis of mystic experience, anthropology, cosmology and Islamic theology... Tirmidhi's system of thought is representative of an old Islamic theosophy which had not yet consciously assimilated elements from the Aristotelian-Neoplatonic philosophic tradition."

He had 62 editions and 108 titles. His works can be divided into six parts: Tafsir (Quranic exegesis), Hadith (prophetic tradition), Fiqh (jurisprudence), Arabic terminology, anthropology, and the theory of sainthood. Some of his works are:

- Nawadir al-usul fi ma'rifat ahadith al-rasul ("The unique principles that emerge from the knowledge of the traditions of the Messenger”), a collection of rare hadith, it consists of 391 chapter.
- Ghawr al-umur ("The depth of things”)
- al-Manhiyyat ("The religious prohibitions”)
- al-Akyas ("The wise ones”)
- Al-amtal min al-Kitab wa-l-Sunna ("The book of parables drawn from the Quran and Sunna”)
- al-Furuq wa-man al-taraduf ("Terminological variations and the impossibility of synonymy in Arabic”)
- Khaqiyqat Al-Odamiyya ("Book about the Nature of a Man")
- Adab an-Nafs ("Bringing up the Soul").
- al-Radd 'ala al-Mu'attila ("The reply to those who deny God's attributes")
- Khatm al-awliya' ("The seal of the saints")
- Kitab as-Salat va Makasidiha (A Book about Prayer and its Aims)
- Kitab Al-Hajj va Asrarihi (A Book about Pilgrimage and its Secrets)
- Al-Ihtiyatat ("The book of Precautions")
- Kitab Al-Jumal Al-Lazim Ma'rifitiha (A Book about Sentences that Should be Known)
- Tahsil naza'ir al-Qur'an ("Polysemy in the Qur'an”)
- al-'Aql wa-l-hawa ("Intellect and passion as opposites”)
- Kitab al-Tawhid ("Book of Monotheism")
- Kitab al-Masayil al-Maknuna ("Book of the Hidden Issues")
- Jawab Kitab Uthman ibn Sa'id min ar-Rayy. ("Answer to the Book of Uthman Ibn Sa'id from Reason")
- Bayan al-Kasbi ("Sermon on the Earner")

== See also ==
- List of Sufis
