= Chellala District =

Coordinates: 33.0331°N 0.0556°E

Chellala District دائرة شلالة
- District
- Map of Algeria highlighting El Bayadh Province
- Country: Algeria
- Province: El Bayadh
- District seat: Chellala

Area
  - Total: 3,164 km^{2} (1,222 sq mi)

Population (2005)
  - Total: 5,883
  - Density: 1.859/km^{2} (4.816/sq mi)
- Time zone: UTC+01 (CET)
- Municipalities: 2

Chellala is a district in El Abiodh Sidi Cheikh Province, Algeria. It was named after its capital, Chellala.

== Municipalities ==
The district is further divided into 2 municipalities:

- Chellala
- El Maharra
