= Aïn El Orak =

- Commune and town

- Location within Algeria
- Coordinates: 33°24′36″N 0°44′19″E
- Country: Algeria
- Province: El Abiodh Sidi Cheikh Province
- District: El Abiodh Sidi Cheikh District

Population (2008)
  - Total: 1,424
- Time zone: UTC+1 (CET)

Aïn El Orak is a town and commune in El Abiodh Sidi Cheikh Province, Algeria.
