= El Abiodh Sidi Cheikh =

El Abiodh Sidi Cheikh الأبيض سيدي الشيخ
- Municipality
- Commune of El Abiodh Sidi Cheikh

- Location of El Abiodh Sidi Cheikh within El Bayadh Province

- Location of El Abiodh Sidi Cheikh within Algeria
- Coordinates: 32°53′55″N 0°32′40″E
- Country: Algeria
- Province: El Abiodh Sidi Cheikh
- District: El Abiodh Sidi Cheikh District

Government
  - PMA Seats: 7

Population (2008)
  - Total: 32,300
- Time zone: UTC+01 (CET)
- Postal code: 32320
- ONS code: 3207

El Abiodh Sidi Cheikh (Arabic: الأبيض سيدي الشيخ, is a municipality in El Abiodh Sidi Cheikh Province, Algeria. It is the district seat of El Abiodh Sidi Cheikh District and has a population of 24.949 (2008), which gives it 7 seats in the PMA. Its postal code is 32300 and its municipal code is 3207.

The town is the base of the Awlad Sidi Shaykh confederation of tribes.
