= Krakda =

Coordinates: 33°19′09″N 0°57′26″E

- city
- Location within Algeria
- Country: Algeria
- Province: El Bayadh
- Time zone: UTC+01 (CET)

Krakda (Arabic: كراكدة) is a municipality in El Bayadh Province, Algeria. It part of Brézina district and has a population of 2.103, which gives it 7 seats in the PMA. Its postal code is 32160 and its municipal code is 3215.
