= El Kheiter =

- Commune and town
- Location within Algeria
- Coordinates: 34°8′36″N 0°4′24″E
- Country: Algeria
- Province: El Bayadh Province
- District: Bougtob District

Population (2008)
  - Total: 6,949
- Time zone: UTC+1 (CET)

El Kheiter is a town and commune in El Bayadh Province, Algeria.
