= Rogassa District =

Coordinates: 34.0184°N 0.9259°E

Rogassa District دائرة روقاسة
- District
- Map of Algeria highlighting El Bayadh Province
- Country: Algeria
- Province: El Bayadh
- District seat: Rogassa

Population (1998)
  - Total: 12,536
- Time zone: UTC+01 (CET)
- Municipalities: 3

Rogassa is a district in El Bayadh Province, Algeria. It was named after its capital, Rogassa.

== Municipalities ==
The district is further divided into 3 municipalities:

- Rogassa
- Kef Lahmar
- Cheguig
