= Sidi Slimane, El Bayadh =

Sidi Slimane
- Commune and town
- Location within Algeria
- Coordinates: 33°50′00″N 1°43′50″E
- Country: Algeria
- Province: El Bayadh Province
- District: Boualem District

Population (2008)
  - Total: 1,806
- Time zone: UTC+1 (CET)

Sidi Slimane is a town and commune in El Bayadh Province, Algeria.
