= El Maharra =

Coordinates: 33°18′42″N 0°21′52″E

- city
- Location within Algeria
- Country: Algeria
- Province: El Abiodh Sidi Cheikh

Government
  - PMA Seats: 11
- Time zone: UTC+01 (CET)

El Maharra (or El Mehara) (Arabic: المـحرة) is a municipality in El Abiodh Sidi Cheikh Province, Algeria. It is part of Chellala District and has a population of 2.138, which gives it 7 seats in the PMA. Its postal code is 32360 and its municipal code is 3219.
