= El Abiodh Sidi Cheikh Province =

El Abiodh Sidi Cheikh Province ولاية الأبيض سيدي الشيخ ⴰⴳⴻⵣⴷⵓ ⵏ ⵍⴻⴱⵢⴻⴹ ⵙⵉⴷⵉ ⵛⵛⵉⵅ
- Province
- Map of El Abiodh Sidi Cheikh Province
- Coordinates: 32°53′55″N 0°32′40″E
- Country: Algeria
- Created: 2026
- Capital: El Abiodh Sidi Cheikh

Area
  - Total: 45,000 km^{2} (17,000 sq mi)

Population (2008)
  - Total: 43,277
  - Density: 0.96/km^{2} (2.5/sq mi)
- Time zone: UTC+01 (CET)
- Area code: +213
- ISO 3166 code: DZ-32
- Districts: 3
- Municipalities: 7

El Abiodh Sidi Cheikh Province (Arabic: ولاية الأبيض سيدي الشيخ, romanized: Wilāyat al-Abyaḍ Sidī ash-Shaykh) is a province (wilaya) in western Algeria, with El Abiodh Sidi Cheikh as its provincial capital. It was created in 2026 by separation from El Bayadh Province.

The province lies in the transition zone from the Saharan Atlas to the Sahara desert and covers an area of about 45,000 km². With around 43,000 inhabitants at the 2008 census, it is very sparsely populated; its population density is about 1 inhabitant per square kilometre.

== Administrative divisions ==
The wilaya of El Abiodh Sidi Cheikh is divided into 7 communes, grouped into 3 districts (daïras).

Daïras	Communes		
Daïras	Name	Pop. 2008	ONS code
El Abiodh Sidi Cheikh	El Abiodh Sidi Cheikh	24,949	3207
El Abiodh Sidi Cheikh	Aïn El Orak	1,424	3208
El Abiodh Sidi Cheikh	Arbaouat	4,321	3209
El Abiodh Sidi Cheikh	El Bnoud	1,607	3216
Boussemghoun	Boussemghoun	3,795	3213
Chellala	Chellala	3,929	3214
Chellala	El Mehara	3,252	3219
