= Arbaouet =

- Commune and town
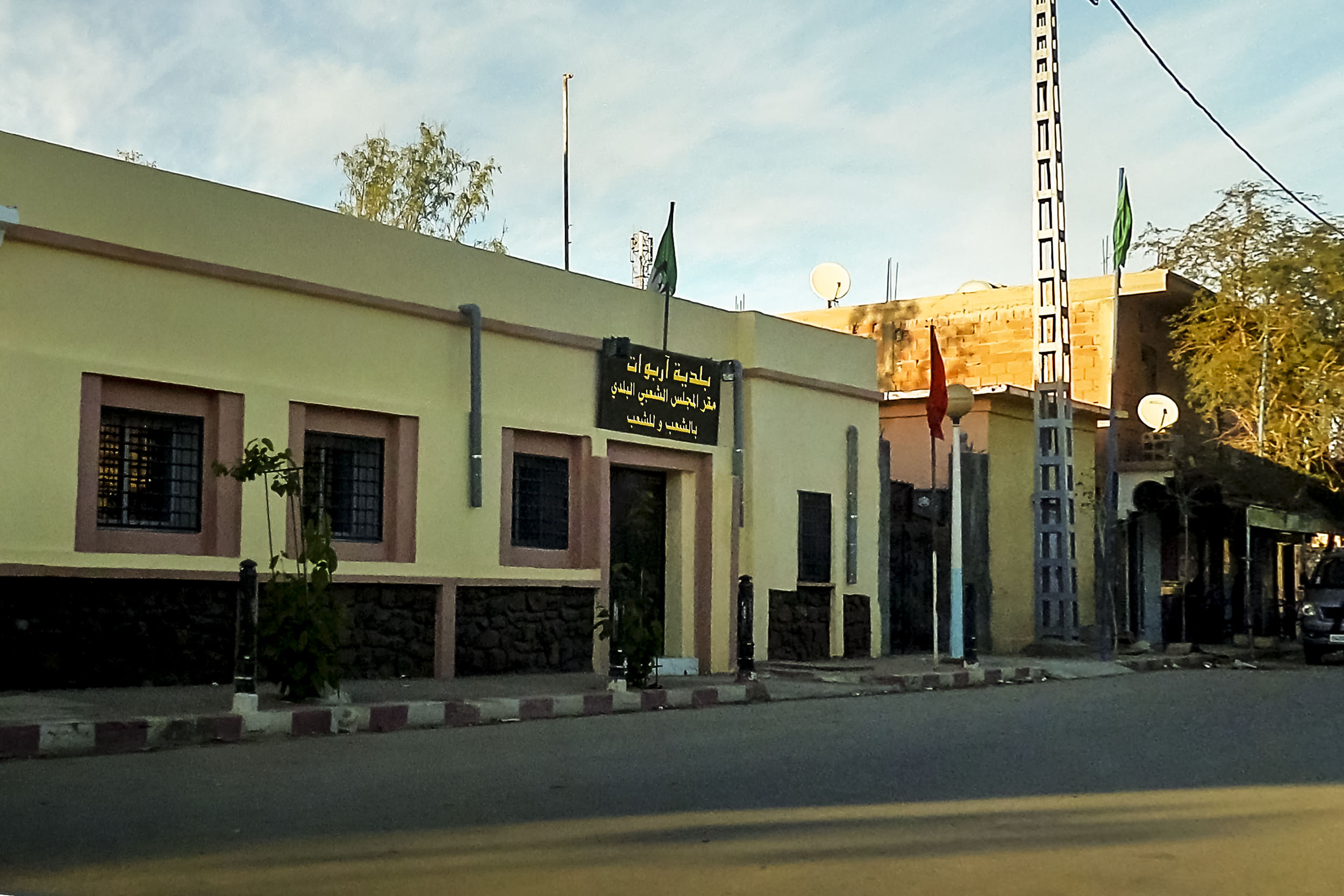
- Arbaouat Town Hall

- Location within Algeria
- Coordinates: 33°5′18″N 0°34′52″E
- Country: Algeria
- Province: El Abiodh Sidi Cheikh Province
- District: El Abiodh Sidi Cheikh District

Population (2008)
  - Total: 4,321
- Time zone: UTC+1 (CET)

Arbaouet is a town and commune in El Abiodh Sidi Cheikh Province, Algeria. It had a population of 4,321 in 2008.

== Geography ==
Arbaouet is located near the Saharan Atlas Mountains, at an elevation of about 1000 m (3280 ft), about 75 km (45 mi) southwest of El Bayadh.

=== Climate ===
Arbaouet has a cold desert climate (Köppen climate classification BWk). The average temperature is around 17.2°C (63°F), and the annual rainfall is approximately 135 mm.

== History ==
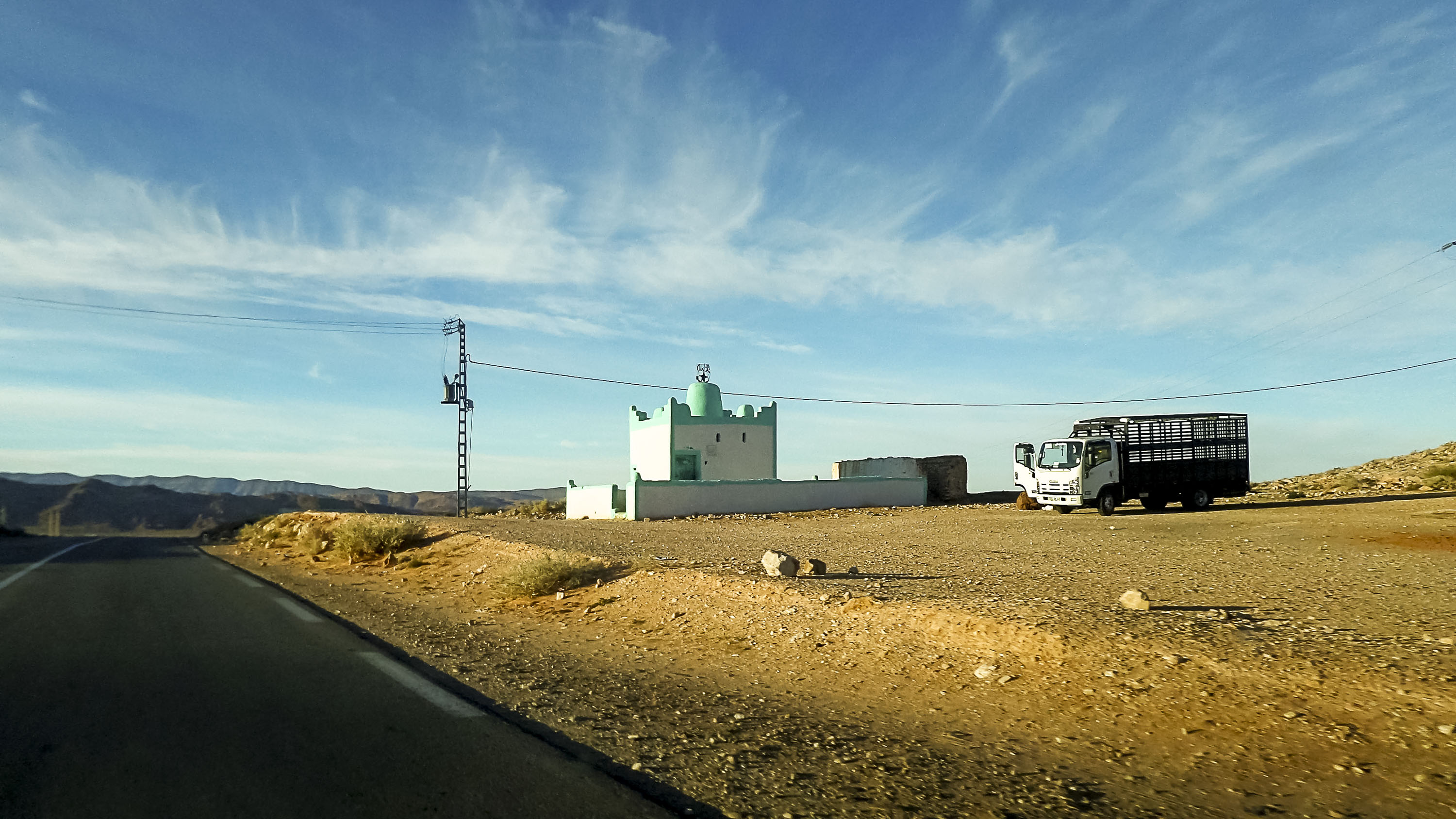
Mausoleum of Sidi Slimane Ben Bousmaha

Arbaouet has been inhabited since at least the 17th century, as shown by the Arbaouet ksar, one of the oldest in the region, which supposedly dates back over a thousand years.

According to some sources, a man named Mamaar Sidi Belalia journeyed from Tunis to propagate Sunni doctrine, and called the region Arbaouet.
