= Bougtob District =

Coordinates: 34.0424°N 0.0893°E

Bougtob District دائرة بوقتوب
- District
- Map of Algeria highlighting El Bayadh Province
- Country: Algeria
- Province: El Bayadh
- District seat: Bougtob

Population (1998)
  - Total: 23,269
- Time zone: UTC+01 (CET)
- Municipalities: 3

Bougtob is a district in El Bayadh Province, Algeria. It was named after its capital, Bougtob, which is home to most of the district's population.

== Municipalities ==
The district is further divided into 3 municipalities:

- Bougtob
- El Kheiter
- Tousmouline

== Industry ==
In 2022, Bougtob District was considered for a model farm to boost domestic milk production and cow breeding.
