= Zawiya of Sidi Ahmed al-Tijani =

Religious site in Fez, Morocco

- زاوية سيدي أحمد التيجاني
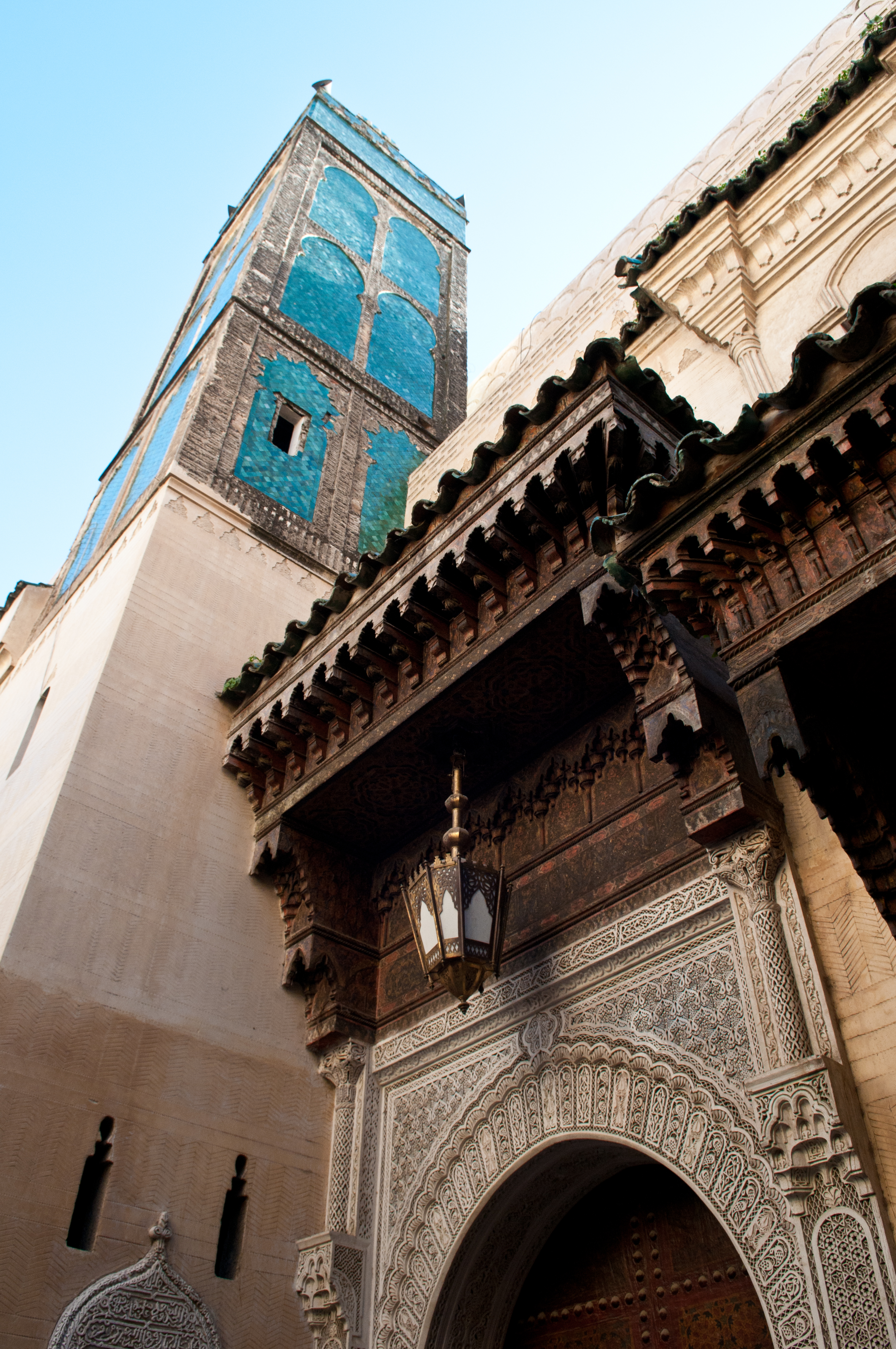

Religion
- Affiliation: Islam
- Status: Active

Location
- Location: Fez, Morocco
- Interactive map of Zawiya of Sidi Ahmed al-Tijani
- Coordinates: 34°03′59″N 4°58′24″W

Architecture
- Type: Zawiya
- Style: Moorish (Alawi)
- Established: 1800
- Minaret: 1

The Zawiya of Sidi Ahmed al-Tijani (Arabic: زاوية سيدي أحمد التيجاني) is a zawiya (Sufi Islamic religious complex) in Fez, Morocco. It is dedicated to the 18th-century founder of the Tijaniyyah order, Sheikh Ahmad al-Tijani, who is buried here.

The zawiya is located in the Al-Blida neighborhood of Fes el Bali, the historic medina of the city, north of to the University of al-Qarawiyyin. It was first built in 1800 and then expanded over time. It is a pilgrimage site for followers of the order around the world, including from Morocco, Algeria, Egypt, and Sub-Saharan Africa, especially Senegal. It is one of several other zawiyas dedicated to al-Tijani.

== History ==
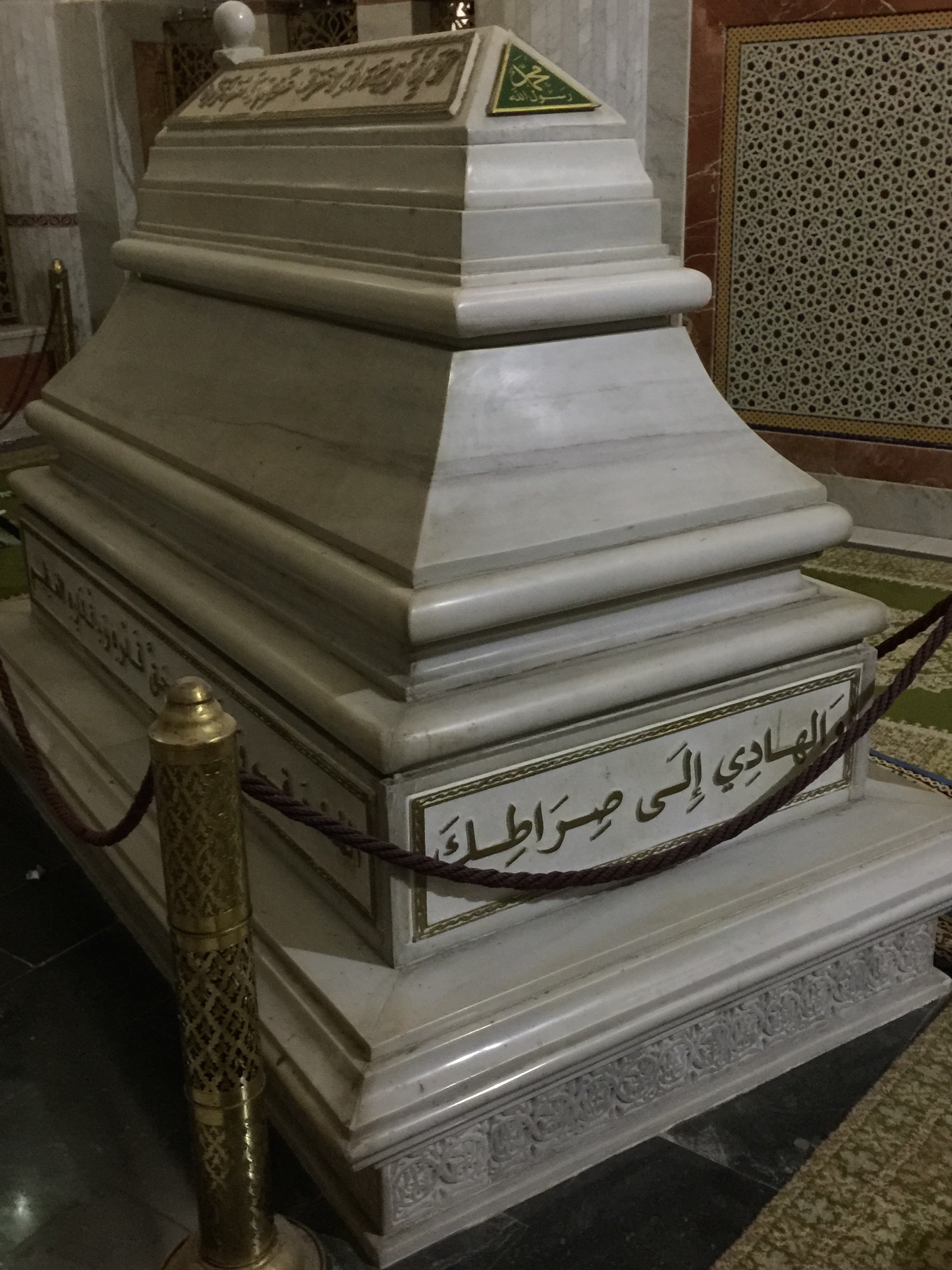
Marble cenotaph of the tomb of al-Tijani, inside the zawiya

Ahmad al-Tijani emigrated from Algeria to Fez in 1789. There, he was given a house by the Alawi sultan Moulay Slimane. Initially, he used this house as a venue for the rituals of his order and its followers. When he decided to build the zawiya, he and his companions looked for a suitable location in Fez. They decided on a ruined, abandoned building in the Al-Blida neighborhood, then known as Al-Dardas. A man known as Sidi al-Lahbi had already built a zawiya there. Al-Tijani purchased the land with his own money, which was considered halal. He also received financial support from the Alawi sultan Moulay Slimane. Some of the population of Fez were hostile to him and tried to prevent the construction, until the sultan intervened to allow it to proceed.

Construction began in 1800, specifically the month of Rabi' al-Awwal in 1215 AH in the Islamic calendar. When al-Tijani died in 1815 he was buried in a mausoleum inside the zawiya, which has since been expanded. After this, strangers were not allowed to visit zawiya and no other burials were permitted at the same site. His companions paid for a marble cenotaph and inscribed it with a quote by al-Tijani, reportedly saying that anybody else buried there would go to hell. The cenotaph is located in the central area, in front of the old entrance.

The zawiya in its initial form consisted of two spaces: the mausoleum, extending to the current minaret, and another space extending to Bab al-Jiyad. The zawiya would later be extended to the Laranga Mosque on one side and to Darb Janiara on the other, with eight doors added. Al-Tijani's followers claimed that he had predicted this expansion during his lifetime. Due to its spiritual and political importance, the sultans of Morocco patronized the zawiya, sponsoring its maintenance and some expansions. These included additions to the courtyard, decorating the mausoleum and minaret with green tiles, and inscriptions containing verses of prophetic praise. In 1881, a new mihrab was added. In 1895, a new public fountain (saqayya) and entrance gate were built. In 1901, some new decorations and inscriptions were added to the wall in front of the tomb. In 1903, a space accommodating pilgrims on the ziyarat was built.

The zawiya was one of several in Fez that (at least prior to colonial rule), had the status of a sanctuary where Muslims could request asylum. It also possessed a significant library.

Since 2007, the zawiya has periodically hosted an international forum for the Tijaniyya order, which in 2014 included Sufis affiliated with the order from 47 countries.

== Architecture ==
The complex is distinguishable by its highly ornamented street facade and a minaret decorated with turquoise tiles.

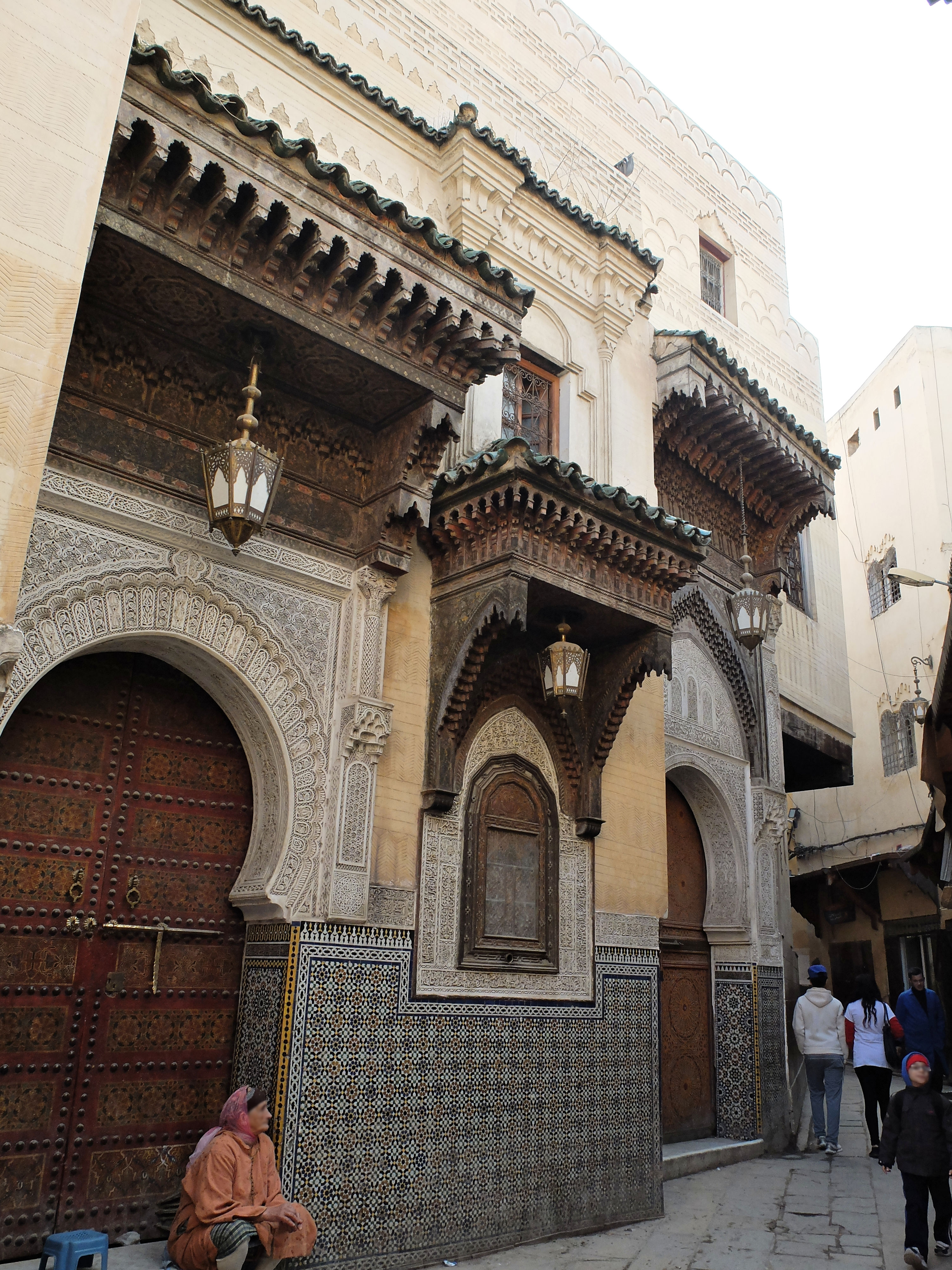
Decorated doorways on the north side of the zawiya, near the minaret

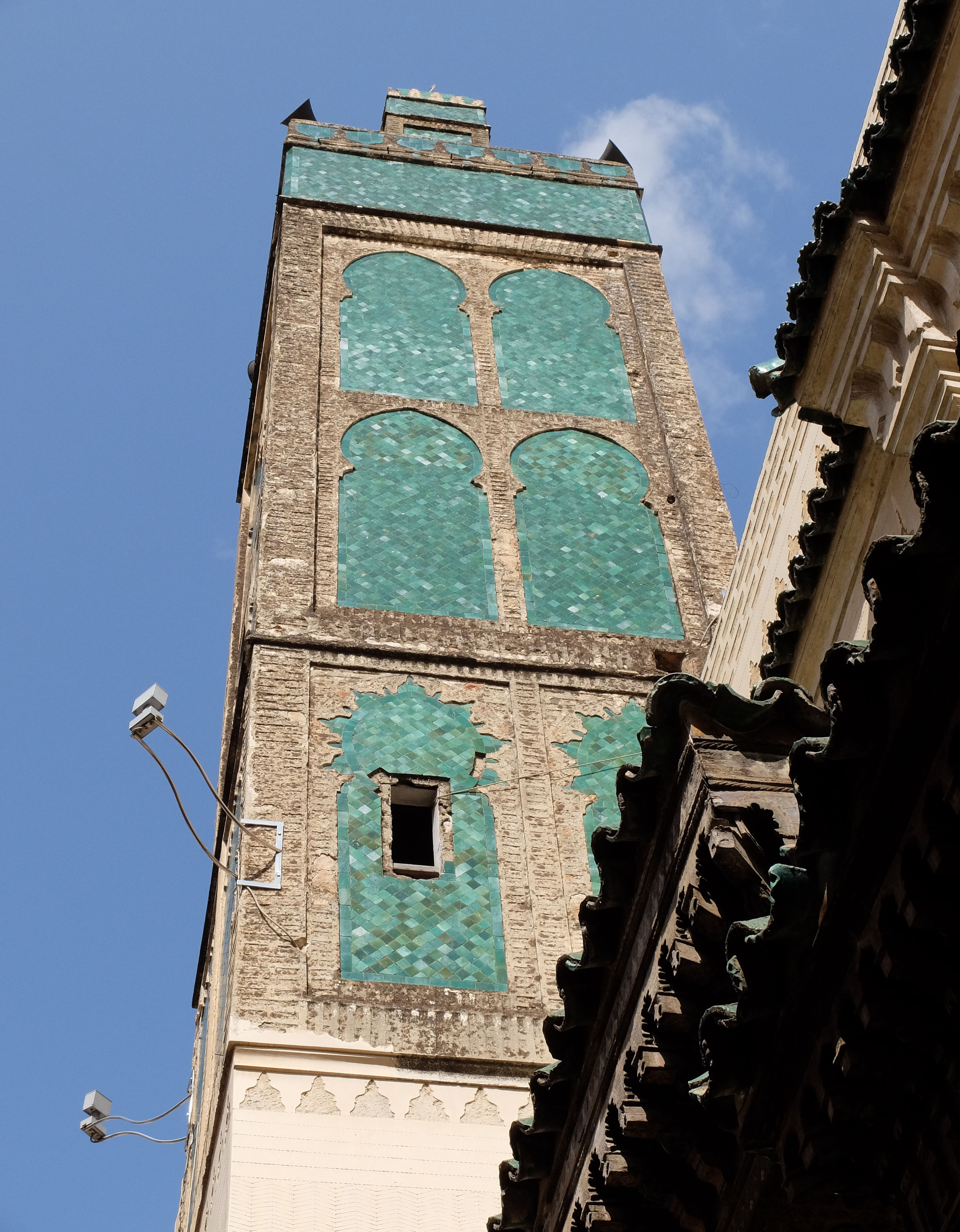
The minaret

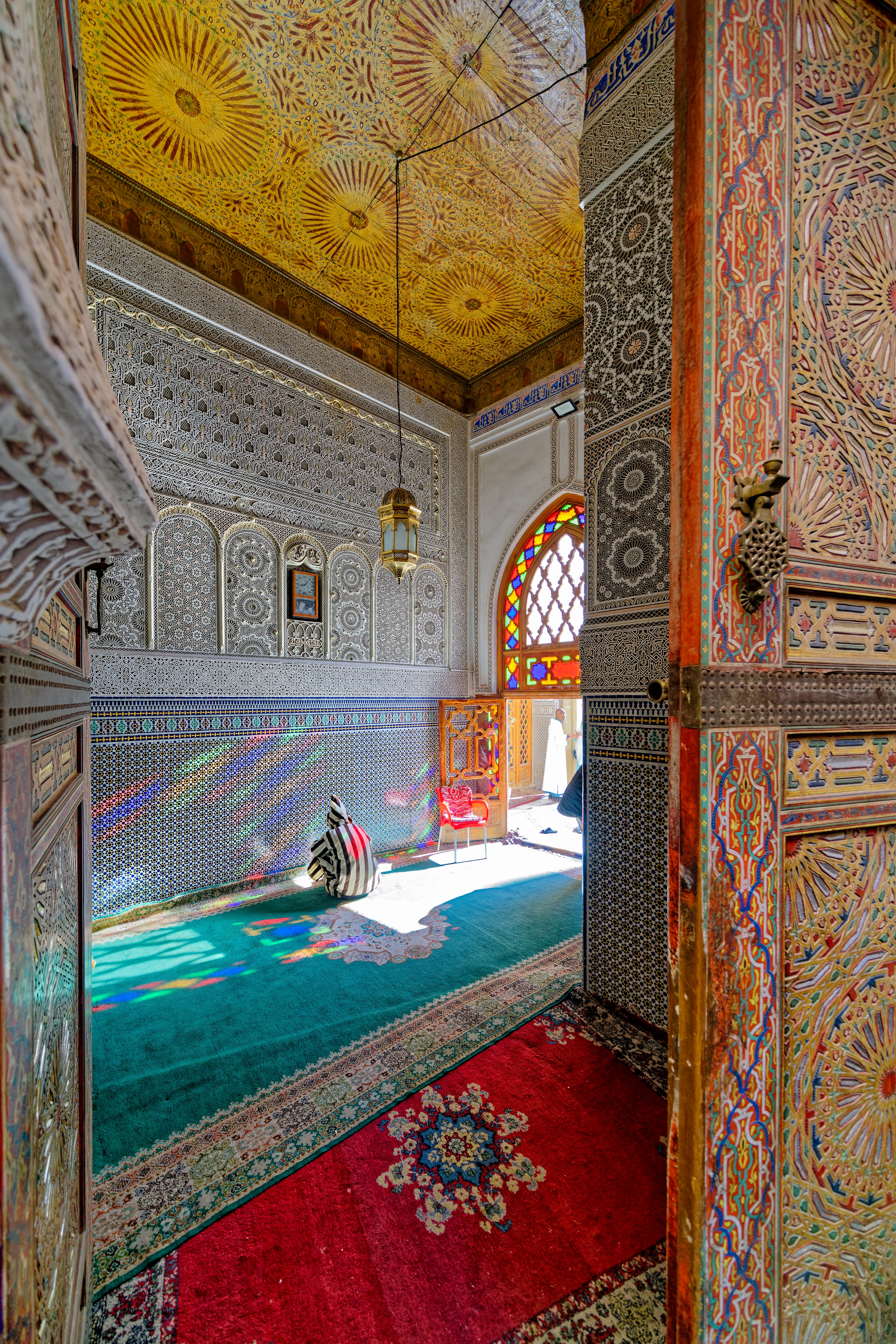
Entrance and vestibule of the zawiya

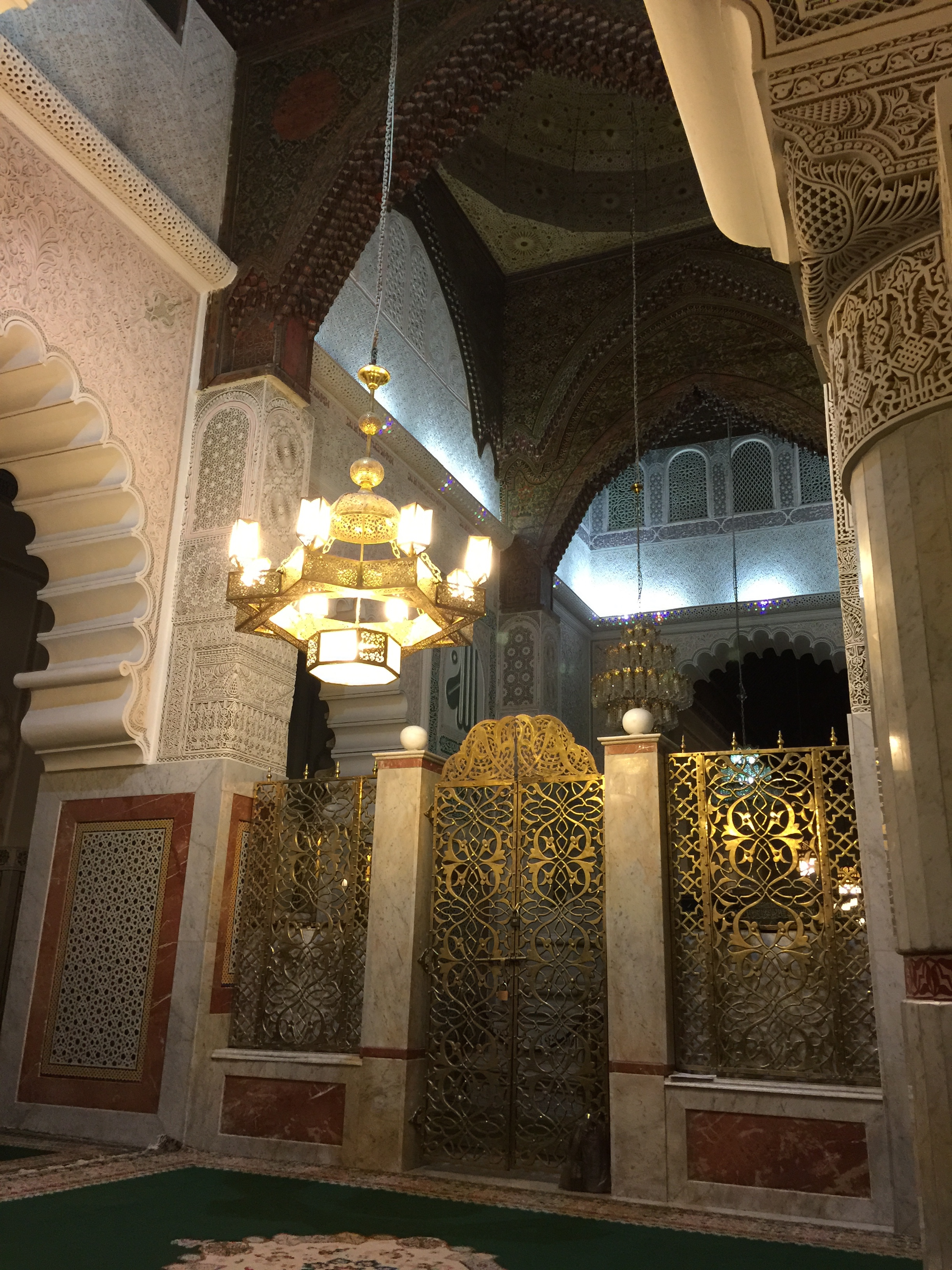
Interior of the zawiya, looking towards the tomb of al-Tijani

== See also ==
- Lists of mosques
- List of mosques in Africa
- List of mosques in Morocco
