= Ghassoul =

Coordinates: 33°23′N 1°12′E

Ghassoul غسول
- city
- Location within Algeria
- Country: Algeria
- Province: El Bayadh
- Time zone: UTC+01 (CET)

Ghassoul (Arabic: غسول) is a municipality in El Bayadh Province, Algeria. It is part of Brézina District and according to the 2008 census it had a population of 7,880. Its postal code is 32150, and its municipal code is 3205.

It is also the name of a red Moroccan clay (sometimes known as Rhassoul) dug in the Atlas mountains.
