= Bougtob =

- Commune and town
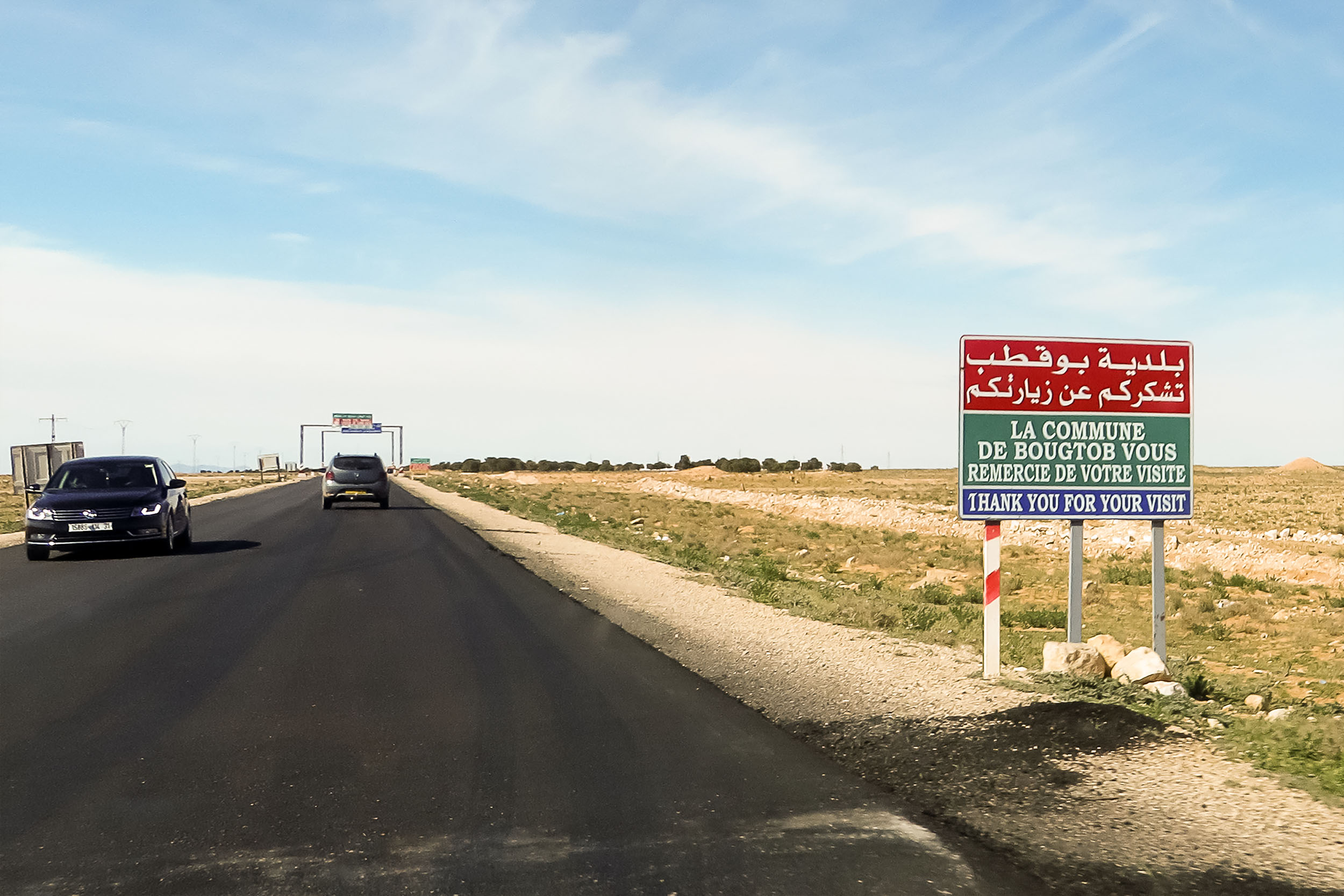

- Location within Algeria
- Coordinates: 34°2′33″N 0°5′21″E
- Country: Algeria
- Province: El Bayadh Province
- District: Bougtob District

Population (2008)
  - Total: 18,568
- Time zone: UTC+1 (CET)

Bougtob is a town and commune in El Bayadh Province, Algeria. It is the district seat of Bougtob District.
