= Sidi Ameur, El Bayadh =

Sidi Ameur
- Commune and town
- Location within Algeria
- Coordinates: 33°46′6″N 1°25′59″E
- Country: Algeria
- Province: El Bayadh Province
- District: Boualem District

Population (2008)
  - Total: 3,634
- Time zone: UTC+1 (CET)

Sidi Ameur is a town and commune in El Bayadh Province, Algeria.
