= Boussemghoun =

Boussemghoun بلدية بوسمغون
- Municipality
- Commune of Boussemghoun
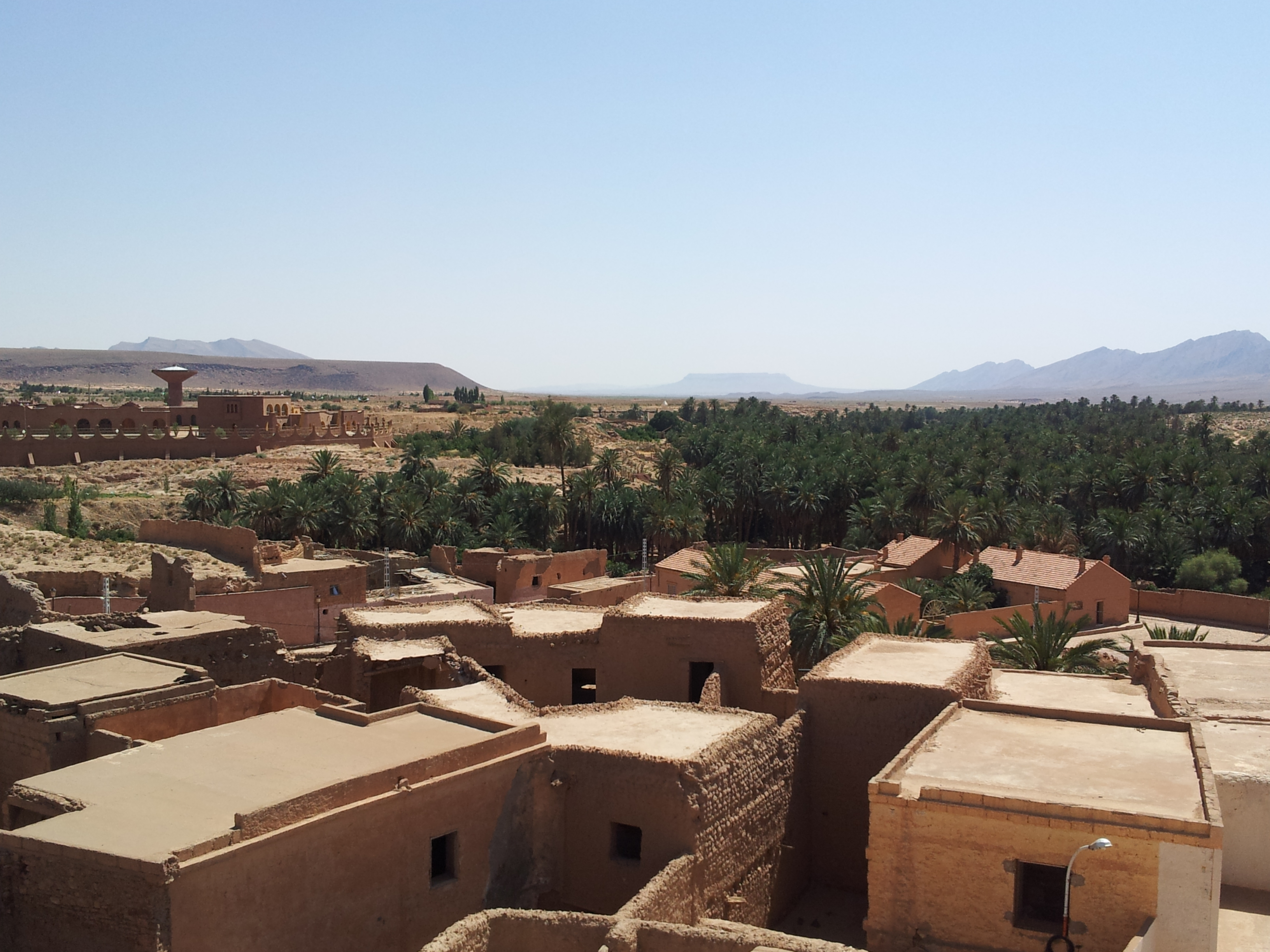

- Location of Boussemghoun within El Bayadh Province

- Location of Boussemghoun within Algeria
- Coordinates: 32°52′N 0°01′E
- Country: Algeria
- Province: El Abiodh Sidi Cheikh
- District: Boussemghoun (coextensive)

Government
  - PMA Seats: 7

Area
  - Total: 585 km^{2} (226 sq mi)
- Elevation: 1,199 m (3,934 ft)

Population (1998)
  - Total: 2,480
  - Density: 4.24/km^{2} (11.0/sq mi)
- Time zone: UTC+01 (CET)
- Postal code: 32320
- ONS code: 3213

Boussemghoun (Arabic: بوسمغون) is a municipality in El Abiodh Sidi Cheikh Province, Algeria. It is co-extensive with the district of Boussemghoun, and has a population of 2,480 which gives it 7 seats in the PMA. Its postal code is 32320 and its municipal code is 3213.

The people of Boussemghoun speak a Berber dialect, locally termed "Chelha" or "Tachelhit"; as of 2004, this remained in regular use, in contrast with some neighbouring villages where the use of Berber is reported to be declining. The oasis is a centre of the Tijaniyyah order, which was founded there by Sidi Ahmad al-Tijani in 1782; it has a Tijaniyyah zaouia.

The earliest known historical mention of Boussemghoun is by Ibn Khaldun, in reference to a raid in 1370.
