= Chellala =

Coordinates: 35°13′N 2°19′E

- city
- Location within Algeria
- Country: Algeria
- Province: El Abiodh Sidi Cheikh

Government
  - PMA Seats: 11
- Time zone: UTC+01 (CET)

Chellala (Arabic: شلالة, lit. waterfall) is a municipality in El Abiodh Sidi Cheikh Province, Algeria. It is the district seat of Chellala district and has a population of 3.745, which gives it 7 seats in the PMA. Its postal code is 32330 and its municipal code is 3214.
