= Khatim al-Awliya' =

Work by Al-Hakim_al-Tirmidhi

Khatim al-Awliya' (Arabic: خاتم الأولياء, ALA-LC: Khatim al-Awliyāʼ, 'The Seal of the Saints') is a work by al-Hakim al-Tirmidhi. It was authored around 873. Ibn Arabi later expanded on the notion.

== Concept of Seal of the Saints in Ibn Arabi's writings ==
Ibn Arabi, in his Meccan Revelations (Arabic: الفتوحات المكيّة, ALA-LC: Al-Futūḥāt al-Makkīyah), explains that all the prophets and saints derive their light from the spirit of Muhammad, the prophet of Islam.

In Ibn Arabi's thinking, the prophets and saints are manifestations of the spirit of Muhammad, which is the start and end point of the whole spiritual hierarchy. The first manifestation of the spirit of Muhammad was the first man, Adam. The last and most perfect was Muhammad himself.

=== Two lines of spiritual transmission ===
In the mystical branch of Islam, Sufism, there are two main lines of spiritual transmission:

1. The 40 tariqas, which trace their line of Spiritual Transmission through Ali b. Abi Talib to the prophet Muhammad. The Seal of Saints of the 40 Tariqas line is said to be Ibn Arabi himself.
2. The chain of transmission which runs through Abu Bakr to Muhammad. The Seal of Saints of the Abu Bakr line is Abdullah ad-Daghistani. This is the Naqshbandi (or Siddiqi) Tariqa.

Ibn Arabi, in his book The Astounding Anqa regarding the Seal of Saints and the Sun of the West (Arabic: عنقاء مغرب في معرفة ختم الأولياء وشمس المغرب, ALA-LC: ʻAnqāʼ al-Mughrib fī Maʻrifat Khatm al-Awliyāʼ wa-Shams al-Maghrib), explains that the name of the Seal of Saints is Abdullah, who is a despised ajami. Ibn Arabi describes the Seal of Saints in detail, using notably difficult symbolic language.

Similarly, Sharafuddin ad-Daghistani, Mawlana Shaykh Nazim and Adnan Qabbani explain that the Seal of Saints of the Siddiqi or Naqshbandi Tariqa is Abdullah ad-Daghistani.

== Bibliography ==
- Michel Chodkiewicz (author). Liadain Sherrard (translator). The Seal of the Saints. Prophethood and Sainthood in the Doctrine of Ibn 'Arabi. The Islamic Texts Society. 1993.
- Gerald T. Elmore. Islamic Sainthood in the Fullness of Time: Ibn al-'Arabi's Book of the Fabulous Gryphon. Koninklijke Brill, The Netherlands, 1998. ISBN 90-04-10991-9 (Chapter VI. The Seal of the Saints.) Google books
- A. E. Affifi. The Mystical Philosophy of Muhyid Din-ibnul Arabi. Cambridge University Press, 1939. Google books
- Toshihiko Izutsu Sufism and Taoism: a comparative study of key philosophical concepts. University of California Press, 1984 Google books
