= Oranie =

Oran region القطاع الوهراني Oranie
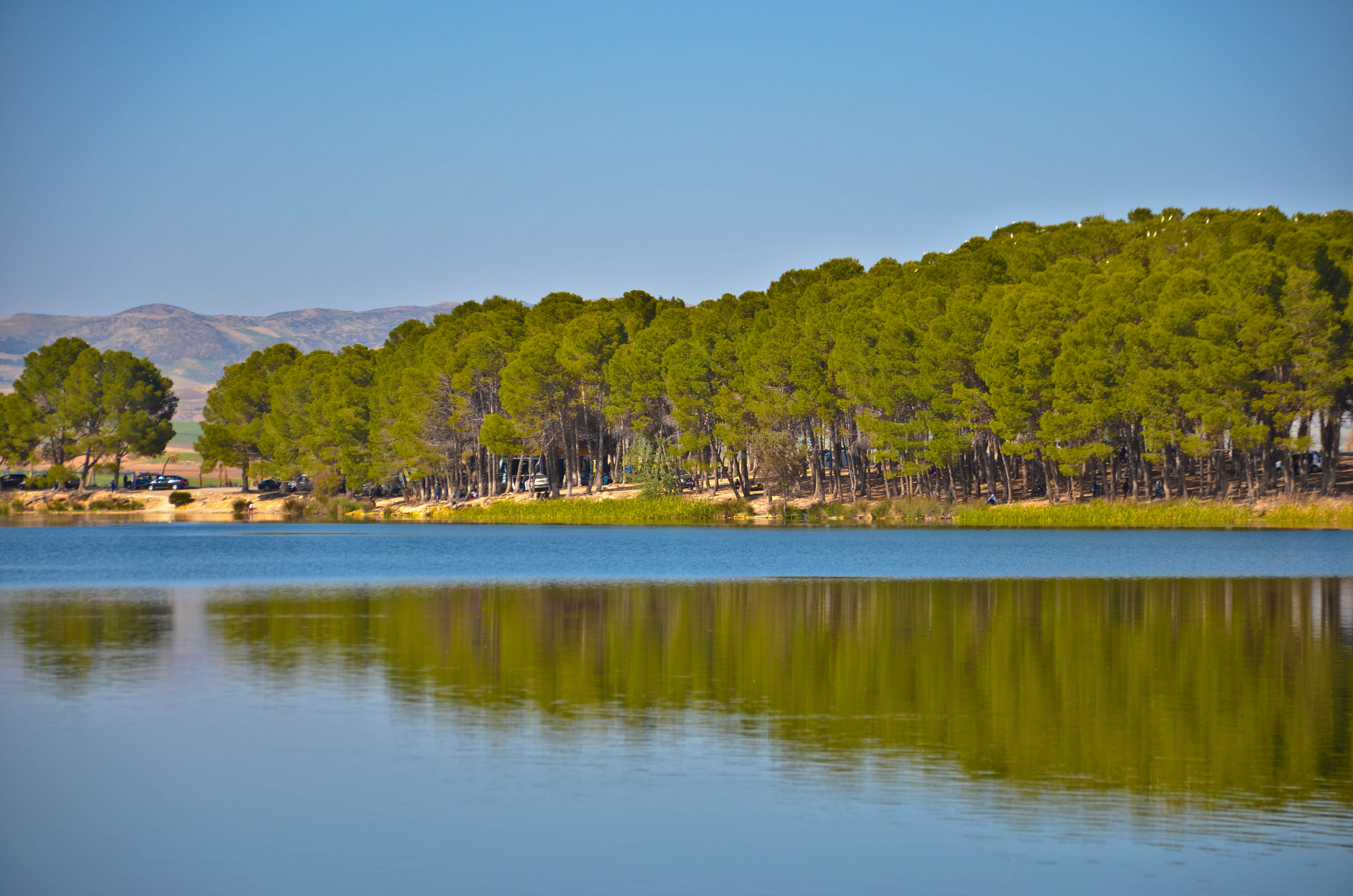
- View of the Sidi Mohamed Benali Lake in Sidi Bel Abbès

- Location of Oran region in northwestern Algeria (northwestern Africa)
- Coordinates: 34.5°N 0.3°W
- Region: Algeria
- Provinces – Wilayas: List: Oran, Aïn Témouchent, Mascara, Mostaganem, Relizane, Saïda, Sidi Bel Abbès, Tiaret, Tlemcen, El Bayadh, El Abiodh Sidi Cheikh, Naâma

Area
  - Total: 164,697 km^{2} (63,590 sq mi)

Population (2010)
  - Total: 7,225,546
  - Density: 43.8718/km^{2} (113.627/sq mi)
- Demonym(s): Arabs; Berbers
  - Summer (DST): UTC+1 (WAT)
  - Summer (DST): UTC+1 (CEST)
- Area code: +213 (Algeria)
- Languages: Arabic; French

The Oran region (Arabic: القطاع الوهراني; French: Oranie) is a cultural region of western Algeria that encompasses the entire northwest of the country and corresponds approximately to the following wilayas: Oran, Aïn Témouchent, Mascara, Mostaganem, Relizane, Saïda, Sidi Bel Abbès, Tiaret, Tlemcen, El Bayadh, El Abiodh Sidi Cheikh, Naâma. The region's capital is the city of Oran.

This region of Algeria is bounded to the east by the middle Chelif valley, to the west by the Oriental region of Morocco, to the north by the Mediterranean Sea, and to the south by the western Hautes Plaines extending to the Saharan Atlas, which forms a natural boundary for the region. The region is also characterized by its proximity to the Spanish coast; the distance between Ghazaouet and Almería ranges from 191 km to 204 km.

== Geography ==
Oran city.

The Oran region is bounded to the north by the Mediterranean Sea along a 400 km coastline, to the west by Morocco, to the south by the Chott Ech Chergui and the Sersou Hautes Plaines, historically, up to the Saharan Atlas, and to the east by the Ouarsenis Mountains and the lower Chelif Valley.

== See also ==
- Culture of Algeria
