= Boualem, El Bayadh =

Boualem
- Commune and town
- Location within Algeria
- Coordinates: 33°43′45″N 1°32′3″E
- Country: Algeria
- Province: El Bayadh Province
- District: Boualem District

Population (2008)
  - Total: 7,578
- Time zone: UTC+1 (CET)

Boualem is a town and commune in El Bayadh Province, Algeria. It is the district seat of Boualem District.
