= People's Municipal Assembly =

Political body governing the municipalities of Algeria

The People's Municipal Assembly (PMA; Arabic: المجلس الشعبي البلدي, romanized: al-Maǧlis aš-Šaʿbī al-Baladī) is the political body governing the municipalities of Algeria. It is composed of an assembly (municipal council) elected on universal suffrage for five years. This assembly further elects a president, the president of the People's Municipal Assembly, which is the Algerian equivalent of a mayor. Local elections for the PMAs and the PPAs were held on November 27, 2021. The building where this assembly is located is also called People's Municipal Assembly.
